= Timeline of women in aviation =

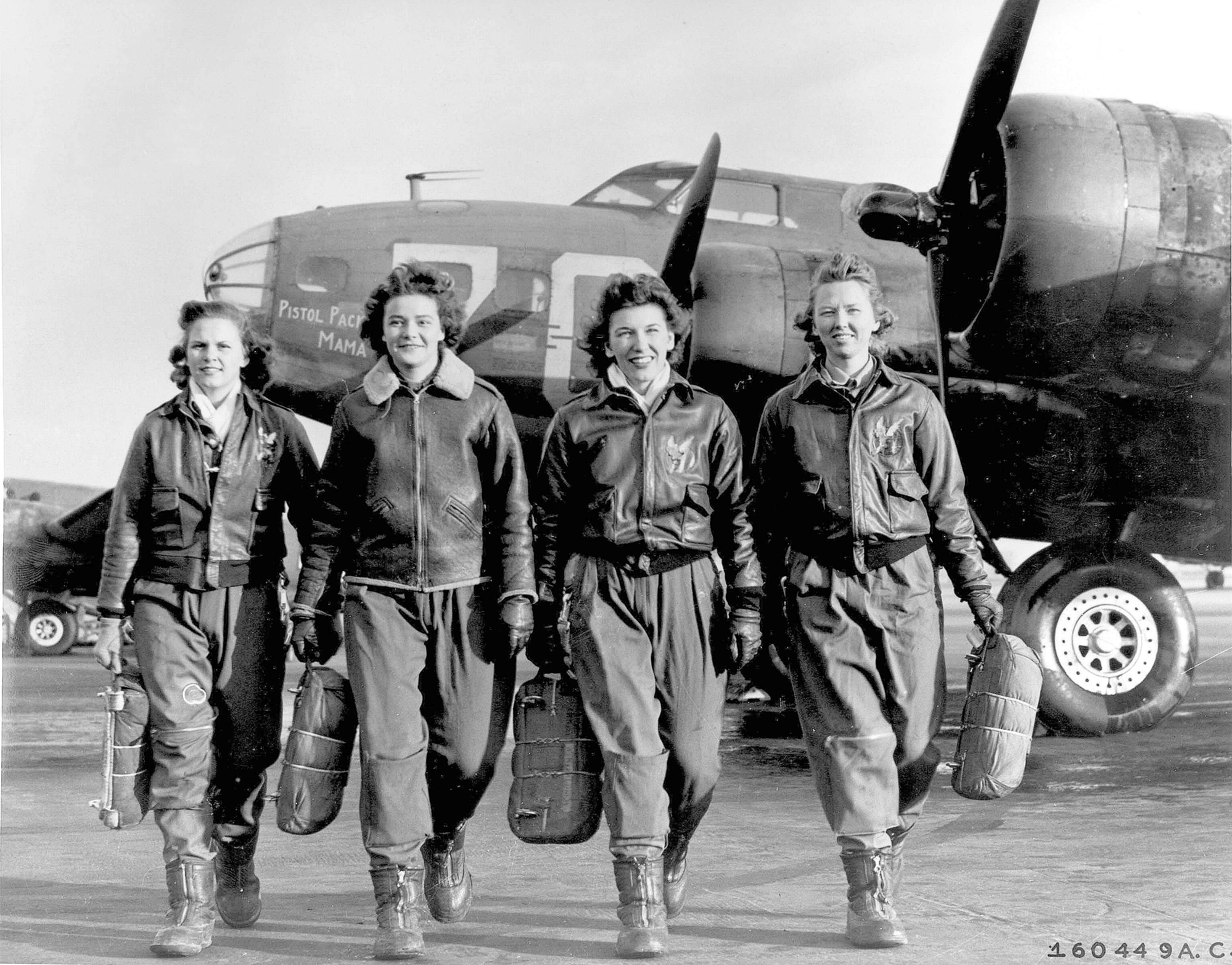
These four pilots at the four-engine school at Lockbourne are members of the Women Airforce Service Pilots (WASPs), trained to ferry the Boeing B-17 Flying Fortress, c. 1944.

This is a timeline of women in aviation which describes many of the firsts and achievements of women as pilots and other roles in aviation. Women who are part of this list have piloted vehicles, including hot-air balloons, gliders, airplanes, dirigibles and helicopters. Some women have been instrumental in support roles. Others have made a name for themselves as parachutists and other forms of flight-related activities. This list encompasses women's achievements from around the globe.

== 18th century ==
=== 1784 ===
- June 4: Marie Élisabeth Thible of France becomes the first woman to fly in a hot-air balloon.

=== 1798 ===
- July 8: After considerable lobbying with the French government, Citoyenne Henri ascends in a balloon alongside André-Jacques Garnerin.
- November 10: Jeanne Labrosse becomes the first woman to pilot an aircraft solo.

=== 1799 ===
- October 12: Jeanne Labrosse becomes the first woman to parachute jump.

== 19th century ==
=== 1810 ===
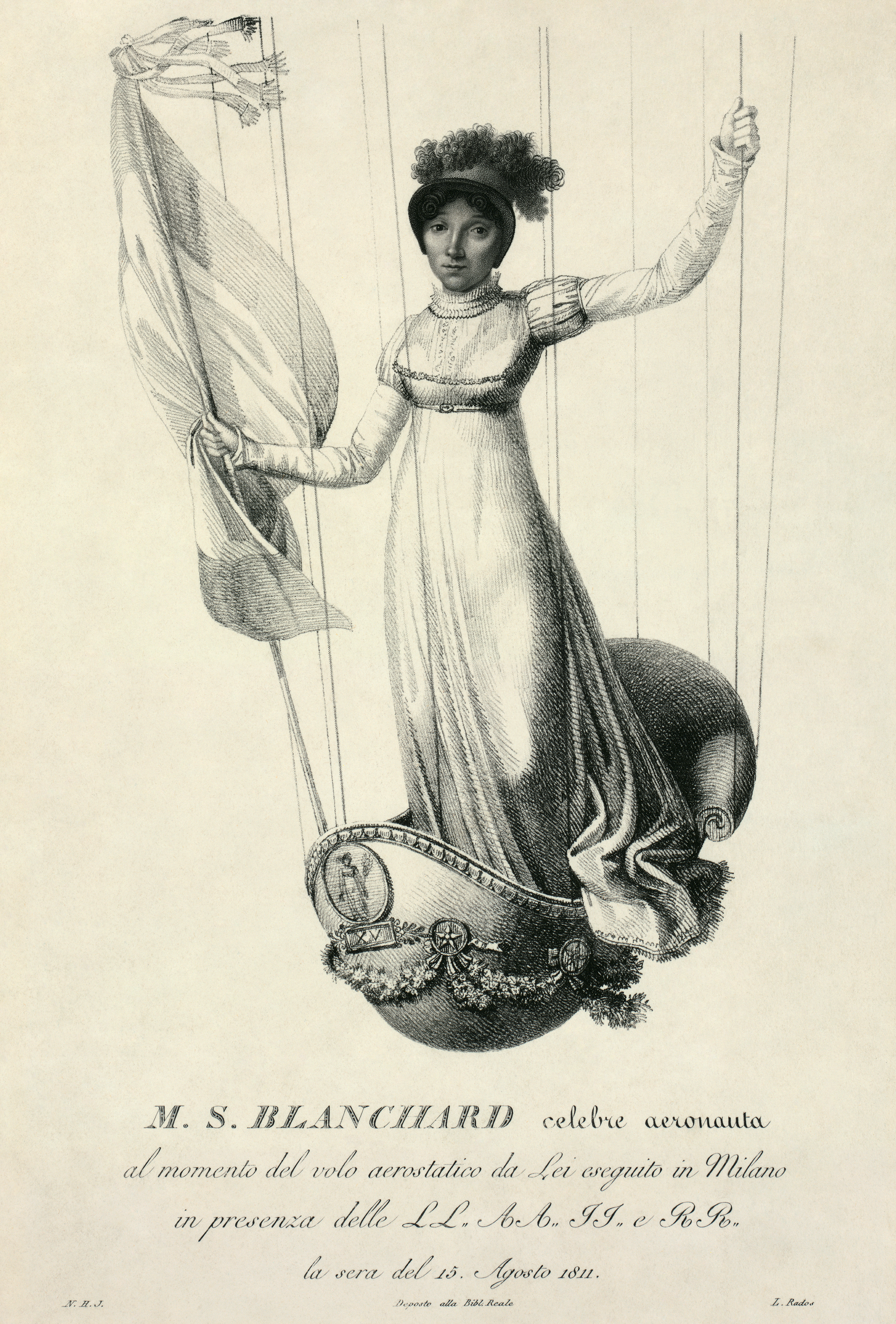
Sophie Blanchard makes her ascent in Milan on 15 August 1811 to mark the 42nd birthday of Napoleon.

- Sophie Blanchard becomes Napoleon's chief of air service.

=== 1811 ===
- Wilhelmine Reichard is the first German woman to make a solo flight in a balloon.

=== 1860 ===
- Louise Bates makes the first parachute jump by a woman in the United States at Cincinnati, Ohio.

=== 1886 ===
- Mary Myers of the United States sets an altitude record with a balloon, rising four miles in the air.

=== 1888 ===
- Teresa Martinez y Perez is issued a British patent for "navigable balloons".
- Clare Van Tassel makes the first parachute jump by a woman in the western United States with a jump from Park Van Tassel's balloon over Los Angeles, California, on July 4.

=== 1890 ===
- Valerie Frietas (performing as Valerie Van Tassell) makes the first parachute jump by a woman in Australia at Newcastle, New South Wales.

=== 1892 ===
- Jeanette Rummary (performing as Jeanette Van Tassell) makes the first balloon flight and parachute jump in what is now Bangladesh at Dhaka.

== 20th century ==
=== 1903 ===
- Aida de Acosta of the United States is the first woman to pilot a motorized aircraft (a dirigible) solo.

=== 1904 ===
- Queen Margherita of Italy creates the Roman Aero Club for ballooning.

=== 1906 ===
- On 28 July 1906, Marie Surcouf earned her aeronautical balloon pilot's license and on 23 August she made her first flight as a pilot aboard the balloon "Bengali", accompanied by Miss Gache. This was the first balloon flight with an all-woman crew.

=== 1908 ===
- May–June 1908: Mlle P. Van Pottelsberghe de la Poterie of Belgium flies with Henri Farman on several short flights at an airshow in Ghent, Belgium, becoming the first woman passenger on an airplane.
- September: Thérèse Peltier, a sculptor, of France makes the first solo flight by a woman in an airplane in Turin, Italy, flying around 200 meters in a straight line about 2.5 m (8 ft 2 in) off the ground. She had been taught by her partner Léon Delagrange and gave up aviation after he was killed in a flying accident.
- October 7: Edith Ogilby Berg, business manager in Europe for the Wright brothers, becomes the first American woman to fly as a passenger.

=== 1909 ===
- Marie Marvingt of France is the first woman to fly over the North Sea; piloting a balloon from Europe to England.
- Hélène Dutrieu of Belgium is the first woman to pilot a real solo flight in an airplane.
- Raymonde de Laroche is the first French woman to pilot a solo flight in an airplane, she hops just over 300 meters.
- 10 February 1909 Aéroclub féminin la Stella, the first aero club for women, is formed in Paris by Marie Surcouf. La Stella's first balloon ascension is held on June 16 at Saint-Cloud.
- Katharine Wright, sister of Wilbur and Orville Wright, is instrumental in advancing her brothers' aviation business. She is the first woman invited to a meeting of the Aero-Club de France and is awarded the Légion d'honneur in recognition of her contributions to early aviation.
- October 27: Sarah Van Deman becomes the first woman to fly in an airplane in the United States. She was taken up as a passenger by Wilbur Wright at the College Park Airport in College Park, Maryland.

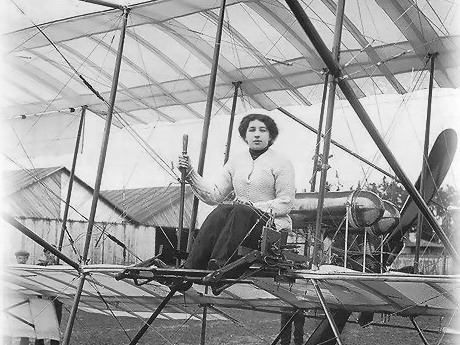
Russian, Lydia Zvereva, the 8th woman to earn a pilot's license

=== 1910 ===
- March 8: Raymonde de Laroche of France becomes the world's first woman to earn a pilot's license (French certificate No.36).
- August 29: Marthe Niel of France becomes the world's second woman to earn a pilot's license.
- August 31: Lilian Bland of Ireland becomes the world's first woman to fly an airplane designed and built by herself.
- September 3: Hélène Dutrieu of Belgium is the first woman in the world to fly with a passenger.
- September 10: Bessie Raiche is credited with the first solo airplane flight by a woman in the United States.
- November 8: Marie Marvingt of France becomes the third woman in France and in the world to earn a pilot's license.
- November 25: Hélène Dutrieu becomes the first Belgian woman and the fourth worldwide to earn a pilot's license (Belgian certificate No.22).
- December 7: Jeanne Herveu of France becomes the world's fifth woman to earn a pilot's license.
- Hilda Hewlett of England is the first woman to co-found a flight school (with Gustav Blondeau with whom she founded the aircraft company Hewlett & Blondeau).
- Hélène Dutrieu is the first woman to win a competition – the Femina Cup for the longest flight that year by a woman.

=== 1911 ===
- June 15: Marie-Louise Driancourt of France becomes the world's sixth woman to earn a pilot's license.
- August 1: Harriet Quimby becomes the first American woman and the seventh worldwide to earn a pilot's license.
- August 10: Lydia Zvereva becomes the first Russian woman and the eighth worldwide to earn a pilot's license (Russian certificate No.31).
- August 17: Matilde Moisant becomes the second American woman and the ninth worldwide to earn a pilot's license.
- August 29: Hilda Hewlett becomes the first English and the world's tenth woman to earn a pilot's license (British certificate No.122) She later becomes the first woman to teach her child to fly in the same year.
- September 13: Amelie Beese becomes the first German woman with a pilot's license (German certificate No.115).
- October 6: Beatrix de Rijk is the first Dutch woman to earn a pilot's license (French certificate No.652).
- October 10: Božena Laglerová is the first Czech woman to earn her pilot's license (Austrian certificate No.37).
- November 19: Lyubov Golanchikova becomes the first Estonian woman to earn a pilot's license (Russian certificate No.56).
- Hélène Dutrieu beats 14 male pilots to win the Coppa del Re ("King's Cup") in Florence, Italy

=== 1912 ===
- Amelie Beese of Germany is the first woman to patent an aircraft design.
- Hélène Dutrieu is the first woman to pilot a seaplane.
- April 16: Harriet Quimby is the first woman to fly across the English Channel.
- May: May Assheton Harbord is first woman to obtain an Aeronaut's Certificate (No.16) in the United Kingdom.
- August 15: Lilly Steinschneider becomes the first Hungarian woman to earn a pilot's license (Hungarian certificate No.4).
- Jeanne Pallier earned her Brevet de pilote d'aéroplane, No. 1012, on 6 September 1912, at the age of forty eight, making her the oldest female aviator at the time.
- Hilda Hewlett is the first woman to co-found an aircraft factory
- Rayna Kasabova becomes the first woman to participate in a military flight

=== 1913 ===
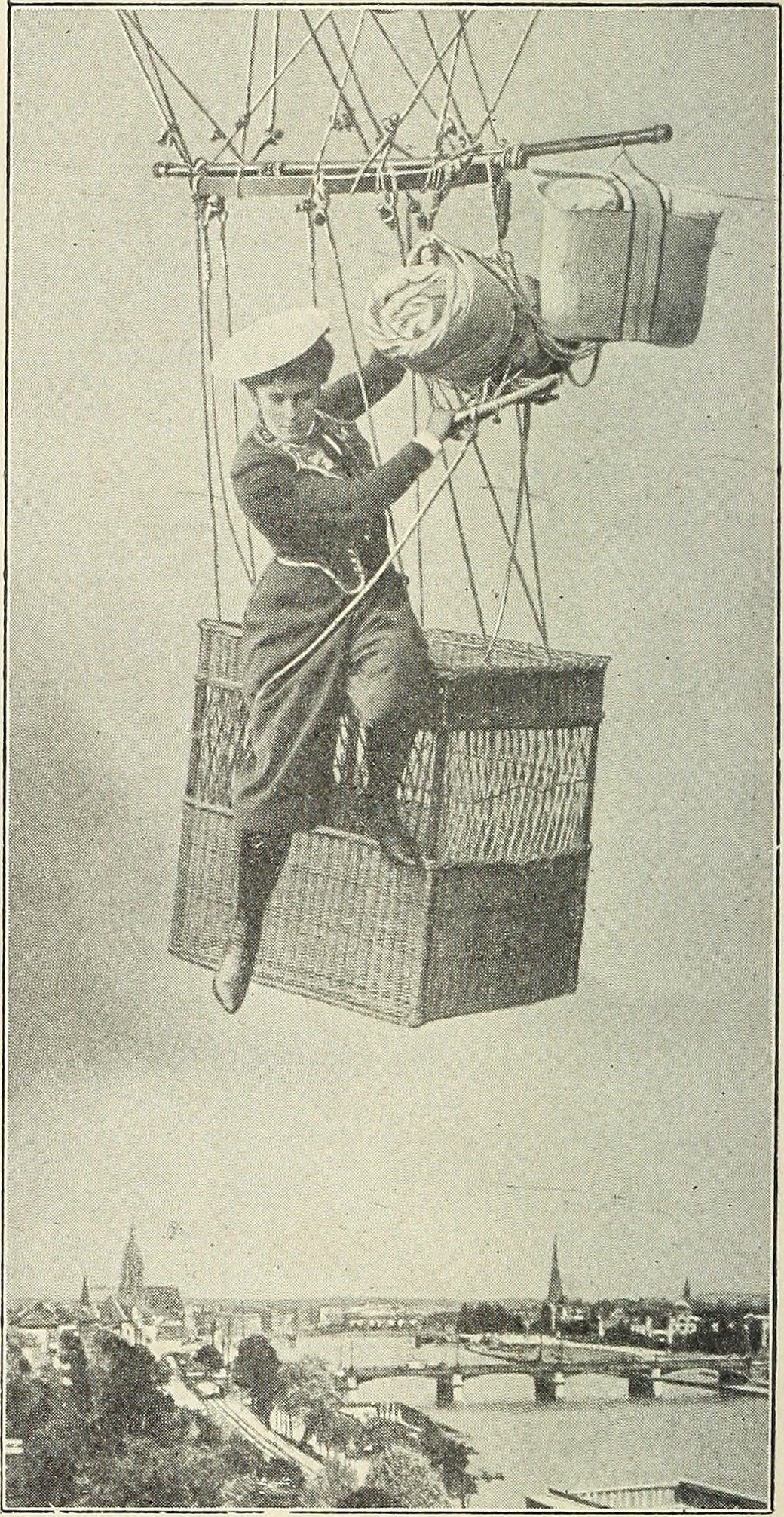
German, Käthe Paulus, inventor of the modern parachute

- January 3: Rosina Ferrario is the first Italian woman to earn her pilot's license.
- June 21, 1913: Georgia "Tiny" Broadwick is the first woman to jump from an aircraft, dropping from 2,000 feet in Los Angeles.
- 22 August 1913: Carmen Damedoz was the last woman to pass the French flying test before the outbreak of the First World War, earning pilot's licence No. 1449 from the Aéro-club de France.
- December 1: Lyubov Golanchikova becomes the first test pilot.
- Ruth Law is the first woman to fly at night.
- Katherine Stinson and her mother start the Stinson Aviation Company. Stinson also becomes the first commissioned woman airmail pilot and first woman to do night skywriting in the same year.
- Ann Maria Bocciarelli, of South Africa, is the first woman in Africa to earn a recreational pilot's license.
- Katharina Paulus (Käthe Paulus) develops the first modern parachute which fit inside of a "pocket" or bag.

=== 1914 ===
- Lydia Zvereva is the first woman to perform an aerobatic maneuver (a loop).
- Eugenie Shakhovskaya is the first woman to become a military pilot when she flew reconnaissance missions for the Tsar.
- February 6: Elena Caragiani-Stoenescu becomes the first Romanian woman to earn a pilot's license.
- May 11: Else Haugk is the first Swiss woman to earn a pilot's license.
- October 1: Amalia Celia Figueredo becomes the first woman in Argentina to earn a pilot's license.

=== 1915 ===
- Marie Marving of France is the first woman to fly in combat.

=== 1916 ===
- Zhang Xiahun (Chinese: 張俠魂) becomes China's first female pilot

=== 1921 ===
- Bessie Coleman is the first African American to earn a pilot's license.
- Adrienne Bolland becomes the first woman to fly over the Andes.
- May: Carmela Combre is the first woman to pilot a plane in Peru, though she never attained a license.
- October: Violet Guirola de Avila of El Salvador completes a flight in Guatemala, becoming the first Salvadoran female pilot.

=== 1922 ===
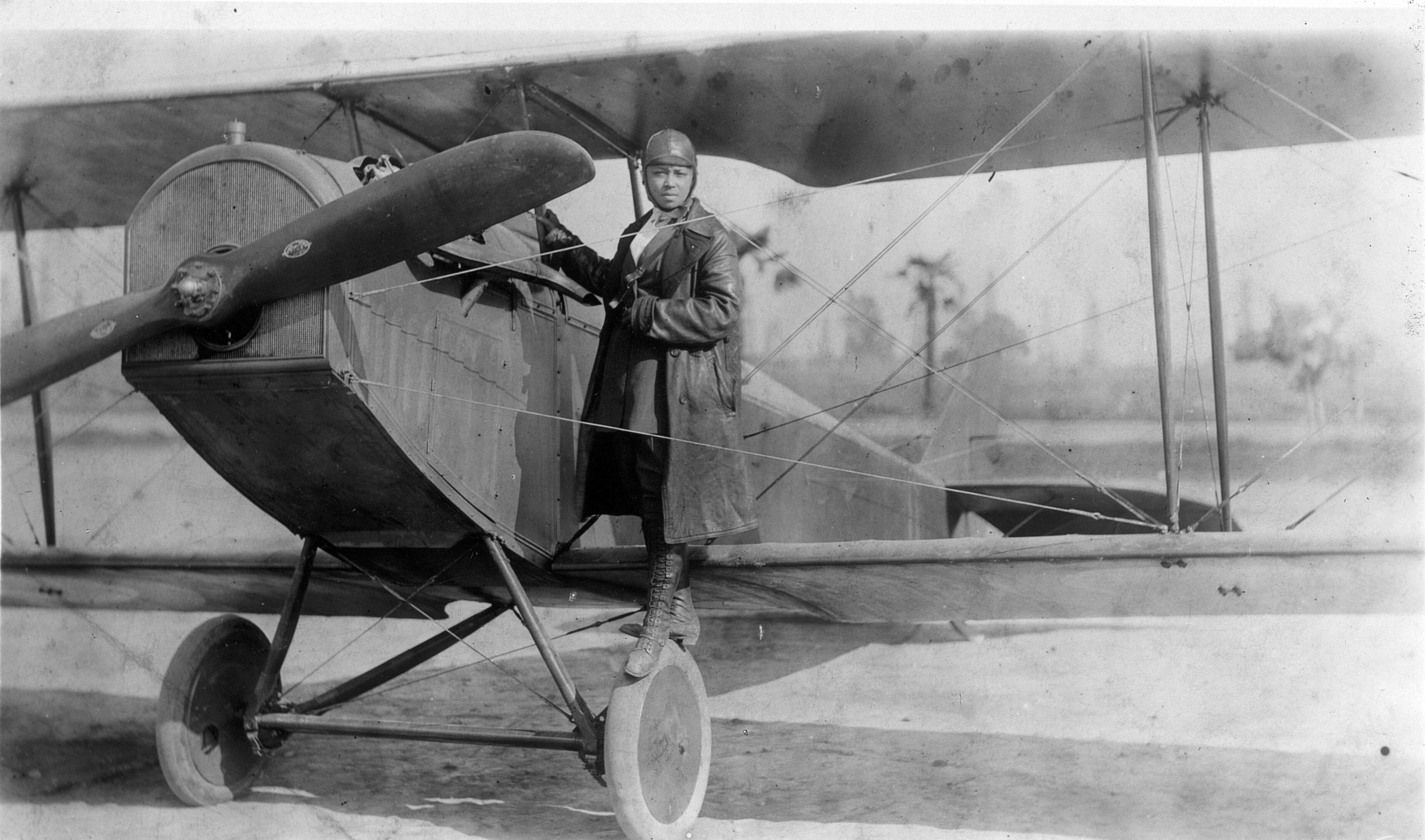
Bessie Coleman and her plane (1922)

- March 15: Bolivian aviator Amalia Villa de la Tapia is the first woman pilot licensed in Peru.
- April 8: Thereza Di Marzo is the first Brazilian woman to earn a pilot's license.
- Tadashi Hyōdō becomes the first Japanese woman to earn a pilot's license.
- Anesia Pinheiro Machado earns the Aero Club of Brazil Brevet No. 77 for her solo flight. She becomes the first woman pilot in Brazil to carry passengers.

=== 1924 ===
- November 24: María Bernaldo de Quirós (1898–1983) is the first Spanish woman to receive a pilot's licence.

=== 1925 ===
- Kwon Ki-ok is the first Korean woman to earn a pilot's license.
- Gladys Sandford becomes the first woman in New Zealand to earn her pilot's license.

=== 1926 ===
- Millicent Bryant is the first Australian woman to earn a pilot's license.

=== 1927 ===
- Marga von Etzdorf of Germany is the first woman to fly for an airline.
- Millicent Bryant is the first Australian woman to earn a pilot's license.
- Dagny Berger is the first Norwegian woman to receive a flying certificate.

=== 1928 ===
- February–May: Mary, Lady Heath an Irish woman, becomes the first woman to fly from Cape Town, South Africa to Croydon Aerodrome in London.
- March–April: Mary Bailey of England is the first woman to fly solo from England to South Africa.
- Maria de Lourdes Sá Teixeira of Portugal earns the first pilot's license for a woman in her country.
- Geneviève Gemayel is the first Lebanese and Arab woman to fly an aeroplane.
- Eileen Vollick is the first Canadian woman to earn her pilot's license.
- María Bernaldo de Quirós becomes the first woman from Spain to earn a pilot's license.
- Janet Bragg is the first woman admitted to the Curtiss-Wright School of Aeronautics.
- Park Kyung-won becomes the first Korean woman to earn a 2nd class pilot's license.
- Janet Hendry becomes the first woman from Scotland to earn a pilot's license.
- Karolina Iwaszkiewicz becomes the first woman from Poland to earn a pilot's license.

=== 1929 ===
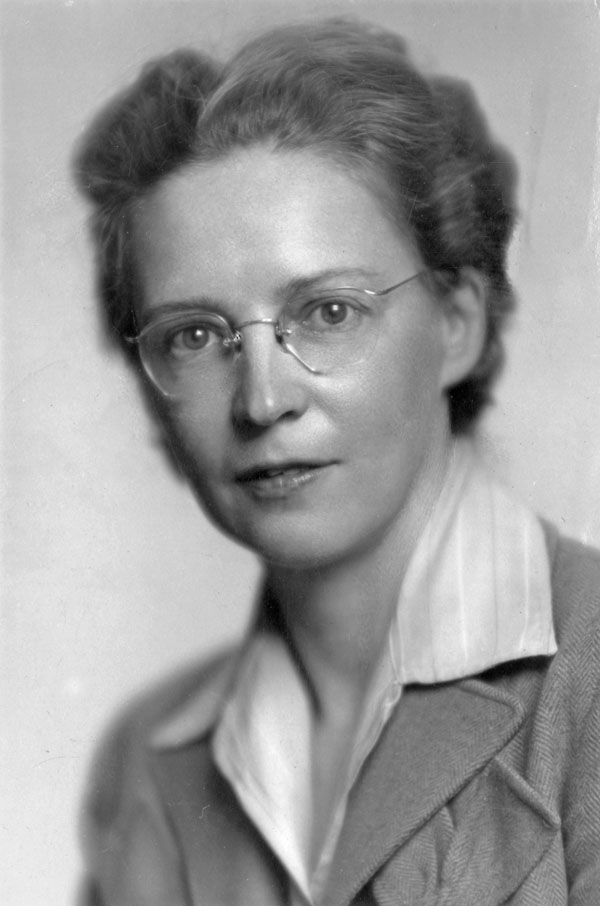
Elsie MacGill, the first woman to earn an aeronautical engineering degree

- The Federation Aeronautique Internationale creates a new category for records set by women pilots.
- Florence Lowe "Pancho" Barnes becomes the first stunt pilot, working in Hollywood.
- Phyllis Arnott is the first Australian woman to earn a Commercial Pilot's License, however, she only flew for pleasure.
- Elsie MacGill of Canada becomes the first woman to earn a master's degree in aeronautical engineering.
- Audrey Fiander becomes the first woman pilot in Rhodesia, now Zimbabwe.
- March 16: Louise Thaden does the women's endurance record with a time of 22 hours and 3 minutes.
- August 18: First Women's Air Derby is held in the United States. Louise Thaden is the winner.
- November 2: The Ninety Nines are founded to create a group to support and mentor women in aviation.

=== 1930 ===
- Amy Johnson is the first woman pilot to fly from England to Australia.
- Elinor Smith and Evelyn Trout of the US are the first women to refuel a plane in flight.
- Mary Riddle becomes the second Native American to earn a pilot's license. She was a member of the Clatsop and Quinault Tribes. The first Native American woman was Bessie Coleman, though her legacy is not as a Native woman.
- Ellen Church convinced Boeing Air Transport to hire the first flight attendants, herself and seven other women who were required to be nurses, unmarried and weigh under 115 pounds.
- January: Aris Emma Walder becomes Uruguay's first woman pilot when she attained her license in Buenos Aires, Argentina at the Morón Aerodrome in a Curtiss JN-4D.
- March: Berta Moraleda performs in an airshow. In May, having completed her training at the Escuela de Aviación Curtiss, she becomes the first woman pilot in Cuba.
- May: Laura Ingalls, a distance and stunt pilot from New York, set a stunt record of 980 consecutive, continuous loops in a little less than 4 hours at Hatbox Field in Muskogee, Oklahoma.
- July: Graciela Cooper Godoy obtains the first license for a woman pilot in Chile.
- September: Maryse Bastié of France breaks the sustained flight endurance record for women, remaining aloft for 38 hours.

=== 1931 ===
- August 5: Katharina Paulus makes her final balloon flight at age 63. She had over 510 logged balloon flights and over 150 parachute jumps to her credit.
- Anne Morrow Lindbergh becomes the first US woman to earn a glider pilot's license.
- Marga von Etzdorf is the first woman to fly over Siberia.
- Leyla Mammadbeyova is the first female pilot of Transcaucasia, of Southern Europe and Southwest Asia.
- The Betsy Ross Air Corps is formed in the United States to provide military support flying.

=== 1932 ===
- Winifred Drinkwater (11 April 1913 – 6 October 1996) was a pioneering Scottish aviator and aeroplane engineer. She was the first woman in the world to hold a commercial pilot's licence.
- British-trained Ruthy Tu becomes the first Chinese woman to earn a pilot's license and first woman to join the Chinese Army as a pilot.
- Amelia Earhart is the first woman pilot to fly solo across the Atlantic Ocean.
- Maude Bonney becomes the first woman to do a round-Australia flight.
- Urmila K. Parekh becomes the first Indian woman granted a pilot's license.
- Hermelinda Urvina of Ecuador becomes the first woman in the country to earn a pilot's license.
- Emma Catalina Encinas Aguayo earns the first woman pilot's license in Mexico.

=== 1933 ===
- Bedriye Tahir Gökmen is the first Turkish woman to earn her pilot's license.
- Lotfia Elnadi becomes the first Arab woman, first African woman, and first woman in Egypt to earn a pilot's license.
- Maryse Hilsz of France is the first woman pilot to fly from Beijing to Paris.
- Fay Gillis Wells is the first American woman to fly a Soviet-made airplane.
- Carola Lorenzini is the first Argentine pilot certified as a flight instructor.
- Aline Rhonie is the first woman to fly solo from New York to Mexico City.

=== 1934 ===
- October 23: Balloonist Jeannette Piccard becomes the first woman to reach the stratosphere.
- December 31: Helen Richey becomes the first woman to pilot a commercial airliner in the United States. She later resigned because she was not allowed into the all-male pilot's union and rarely allowed to fly.
- Marie Marvingt is the first woman to run a civil air ambulance service.
- Marina Mikhailovna Raskova of Russia is the first woman to instruct at a military flight academy.
- Jean Batten of New Zealand is the first woman to do the "England to Australia" round trip.
- Maryse Hilsz of France is the first woman to do the "Paris to Tokyo" round trip.
- Maude Bonney is the first woman awarded a Most Excellent Order of the British Empire (MBE) award for her "contribution to aviation".

=== 1935 ===
- Marie Marving becomes the first person to "practice aviation para-medicine".
- Amelia Earhart is the first woman to fly a solo round-trip from Hawaii to the continental US.
- Nancy Bird Walton is the first Australian woman to hold a license to allow her to carry passengers.
- Lee Ya-Ching, a Chinese actress, becomes the first woman to be licensed by the Boeing School of Aeronautics.
- Phyllis Doreen Hooper earns the first women pilot's license in South Africa.
- Ninel Gharajyan became the first Armenian woman pilot and parachutist.
- Ada Rogato becomes the first woman licensed glider pilot.
- Katherine Sui Fun Cheung earns the first commercial license issued to a woman of China.

=== 1936 ===
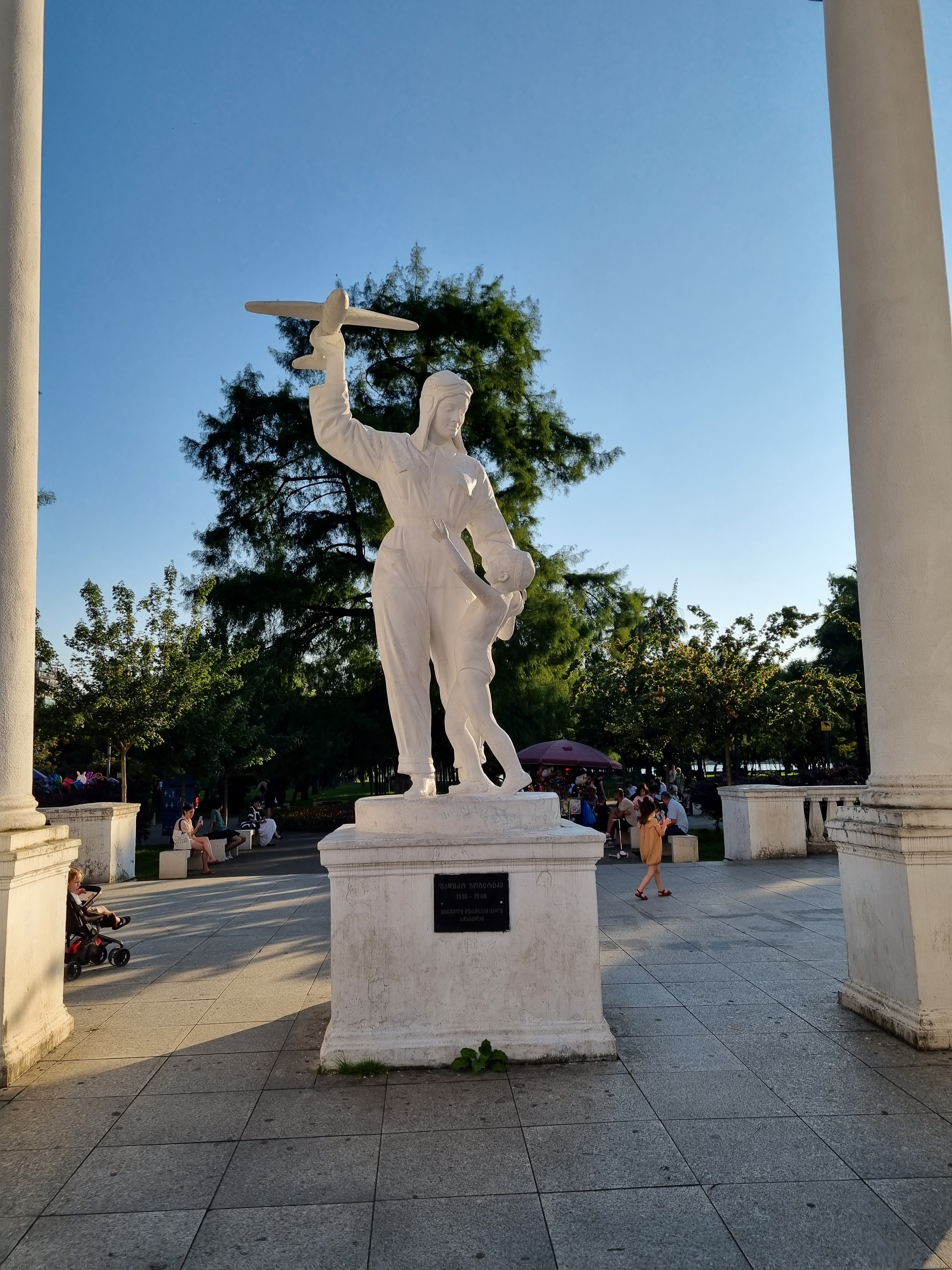
Fadiko Gogitidze monument at Batumi International Airport

- Sarla Thakral becomes the first Indian woman to earn her private pilot's license.
- Beryl Markham from England is the first woman to fly solo across the Atlantic Ocean from east to west.
- Lee Ya-Ching becomes the first woman to be licensed as a pilot in China.
- Phyllis Doreen Hooper earns the first women commercial pilot license in South Africa.
- Mulumebet Emeru is the first woman pilot of Ethiopia. She was a student, but her flight training was interrupted by the Italian invasion of Ethiopia.
- Fadiko Gogitidze becomes Adjara's first woman pilot.

=== 1937 ===
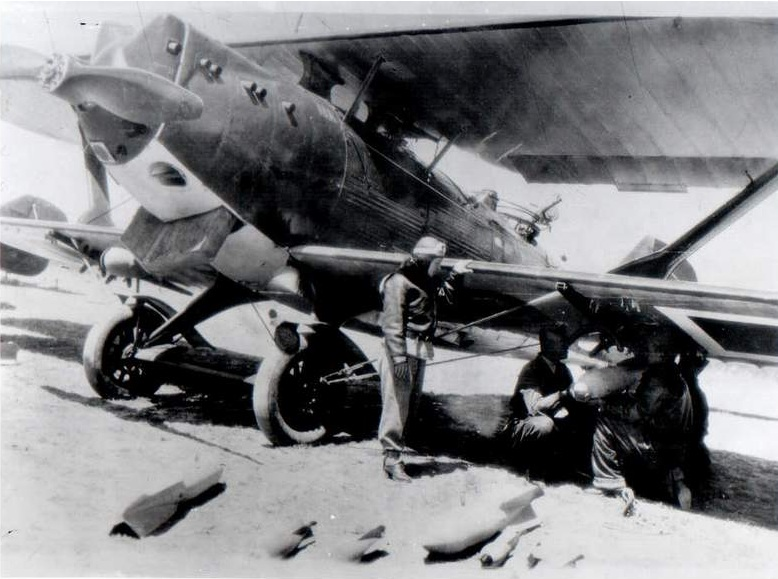
Sabiha Gökçen in front of a Breguet 19, c. 1937

- Willa Brown is the first African American woman to earn her pilot's license in the United States.
- Sabiha Gökçen of Turkey is the first woman combat pilot.
- Hanna Reitsch of Germany is the first woman to earn a helicopter license.
- Maude Bonney is the first woman to fly solo from Australia to South Africa.
- Susana Ferrari Billinghurst is the first woman commercial pilot of Argentina.

=== 1938 ===
- Phyllis Doreen Hooper becomes the first female flight instructor in South Africa.
- Hanna Reitsch of Germany is the first person to fly a helicopter inside of a building. She flew a Focke-Achgelis Fa-61 inside of the Deutschlandhalle in Berlin.
- Berta Servián de Flores becomes the first Paraguayan woman to earn a pilot's license.
- Aline Rhonie becomes the first American to earn an Irish commercial pilot's license.

=== 1939 ===
- Ruth Nichols founds Relief Wings to "coordinate private aircraft for emergency and disaster relief".
- Inés Thomann becomes the first Peruvian woman pilot, when she is licensed at the Escuela de Aviación de "Las Palmas".
- May 15: Soviet A. Kondratyeva sets a record flight of 22 hours and 40 minutes from Moscow to Lukino Polie in a balloon.
- November 13: María Calcaño Ruiz (also known as Mary Calcaño, later Keeler), becomes the first Venezuelan woman pilot, attaining her license in Long Island, New York. Her Venezuelan license is issued the following month.
- November 17: South Africa creates the Women's Auxiliary Air Force to the South African Air Force.
- December 5: The South African Women's Aviation Association (SAWAA) is formed with 110 women as first members.

=== 1940 ===
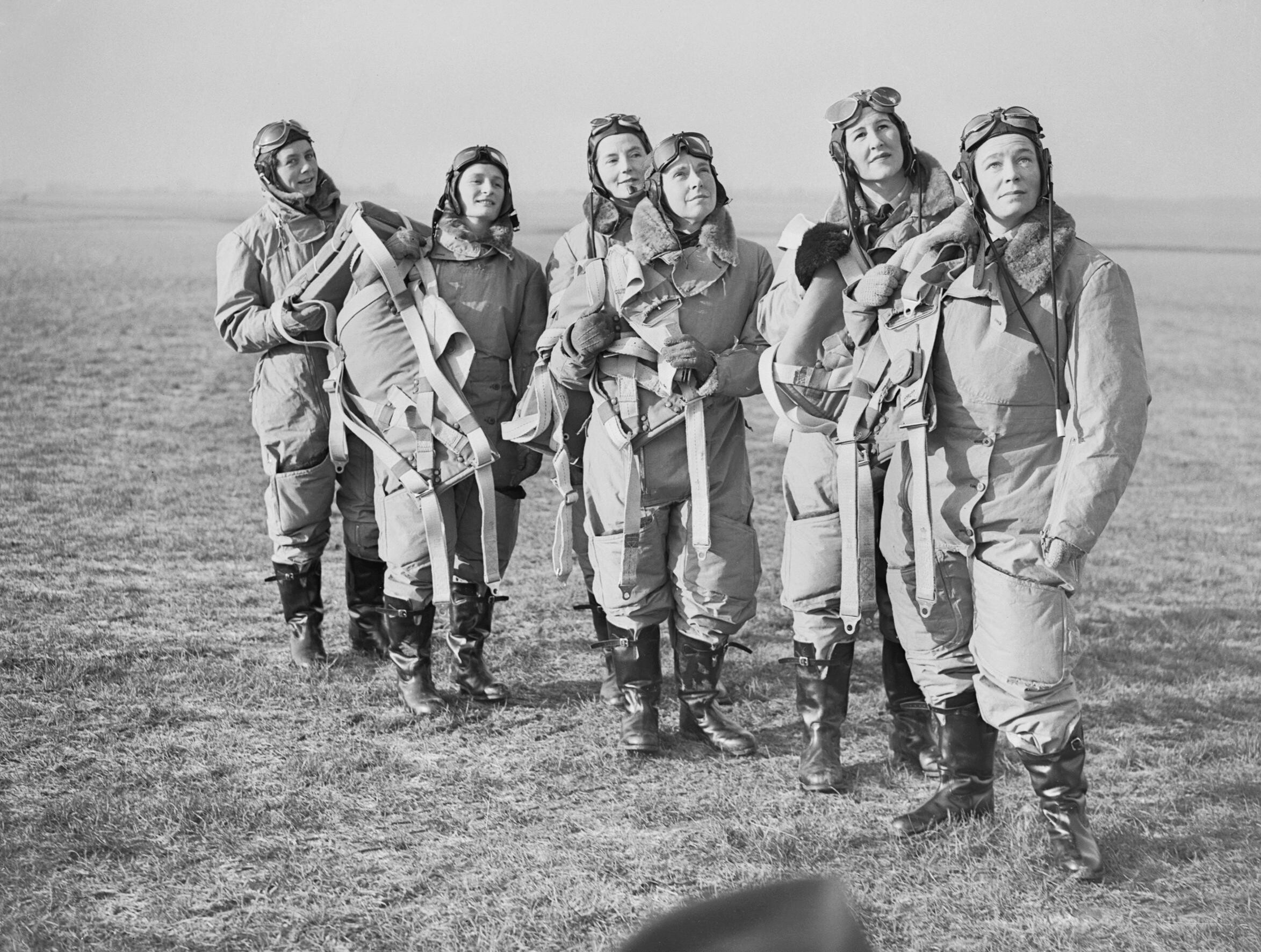
Women pilots of the Air Transport Auxiliary (ATA) in flying kit at Hatfield, 10 January 1940

- Effat Tejaratchi becomes the first Iranian woman to earn her pilot's license.
- January 1: The first eight women pilots are appointed to the UK's Air Transport Auxiliary: Joan Hughes, Margaret Cunnison, Mona Friedlander, Rosemary Rees, Marion Wilberforce, Margaret Fairweather, Gabrielle Patterson, and Winifred Crossley Fair, commanded by Pauline Gower.
- Major Phyllis Dunning (née Phyllis Doreen Hooper) becomes the first South African woman to enter full-time military service as the Commander of the South African Women's Auxiliary Air Force (SAWAAF).
- Mirta Vanni becomes the first woman commercial pilot in Uruguay.
- Dorothy Layne McIntyre becomes the first African-American woman to receive a pilot's license from the Civil Aeronautics Authority.

=== 1941 ===
- July 2: Canada creates the Canadian Women's Auxiliary Air Force (CWAAF).
- Oct 8: Joseph Stalin creates three regiments of women pilots for the Soviet Union military, of which the 588th Regiment is later called the Night Witches.
- Jacqueline Cochran of the United States is the first woman to fly a bomber across the North Atlantic.
- Ada Rogato becomes the first certified woman paratrooper in Brazil.

=== 1942 ===
- June 1: Mary Chance VanScyoc becomes the United States' first female civilian air-traffic controller.
- September 14: General Henry Arnold approves the program that created the United States Army Air Forces Women's Flying Training Detachment (WFTD).
- September 25: Andrée Borrel becomes the first female SOE agent to parachute into German-occupied France and the first female secret agent known to have parachuted into enemy territory.

=== 1943 ===
- Janet Bragg becomes the first African American woman to earn a commercial pilot's license.

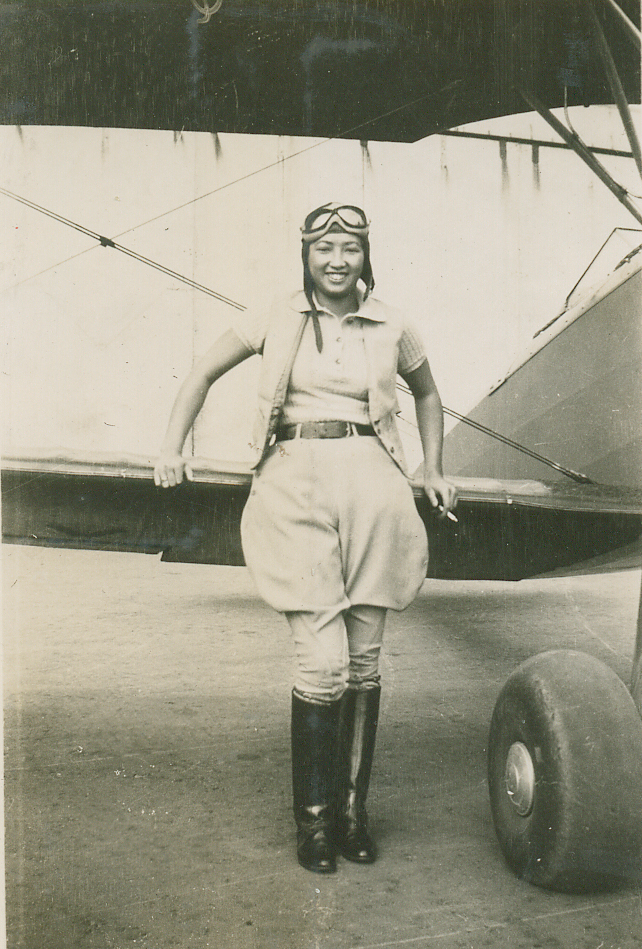
Hazel Ying Lee, one of the first two Chinese Americans in the Women Air Force Service Pilots

- Lidya Litvyak and Yekaterina Budanova of the Soviet Air forces become the only women considered as flying aces.
- Dora Koeppen, a licensed pilot, becomes the first stewardess for Chile's LAN Airlines.
- July 1: Luisa Elena Contreras Mattera is the first Venezuelan woman to be granted a license after training in Venezuela
- August 5: The Women Airforce Service Pilots (WASP) program is formed in the United States by merging WFTD and WAFS.

=== 1944 ===
- 1944: Hazel Ying Lee becomes the first Chinese-American woman to fly for the U.S. military, as a member of the Women Airforce Service Pilots (WASP).
- October 12: Ann Baumgartner became the first American woman to fly a jet aircraft when she flew the Bell YP-59A jet fighter at Wright Field as a test pilot during World War II in the Women Airforce Service Pilots program.
- December 20: The WASP is disbanded and the women who served were not given any benefits for their service.

=== 1945 ===
- Betty Greene, a former WASP, becomes the first pilot for the Mission Aviation Fellowship.
- The Air Transport Auxiliary is disbanded.
- Margot Duhalde of Chile, former ATA pilot, becomes the first female pilot in the French Air Force.
- Valérie André, a neurosurgeon and member of the French army, becomes the first woman to fly a helicopter in combat, while serving in Indochina.

=== 1946 ===
- María Quelquejeu becomes the first woman pilot of Panama.

=== 1947 ===
- Prem Mathur becomes the first woman commercial pilot in India, flying for Deccan Airways.

=== 1948 ===
- Isabella Ribeiro de Cabral is the first woman from Trinidad and Tobago to earn a pilot's license.
- Ada Rogato of Brazil becomes the first woman agricultural pilot.

=== 1949 ===
- Margaret Clarke becomes Australia's first agricultural pilot.
- Dorothy Layne McIntyre becomes the first African-American woman licensed as a pilot by the Civil Aeronautics Authority.
- Josephine Samaan Ibrahim Haddad became the first Iraqi, Assyrian woman to earn the rank of captain and pilot an aircraft in Baghdad Iraq.

=== 1950 ===
- September 16: Thirty-five women, including Nancy-Bird Walton, create the Australian Women Pilots' Association (AWPA).

=== 1951 ===
- Touria Chaoui is the first woman from Morocco to earn her pilot's license.
- Myriam Ben is the first Algerian woman to earn a pilot's license.

=== 1952 ===
- Patricia Graham is the first Australian woman pilot to work in New Guinea.
- Touria Chaoui becomes the first Moroccan and second Arab woman pilot.
- Earsley Barnett, American wife of Major Carl Barnett, founder of Wings Jamaica, obtains the first woman pilot's license in Jamaica.
- Kim Kyung-Oh of Korea is commissioned as the first woman lieutenant in the 1st combat wing of the Republic of Korea Air Force.

=== 1953 ===
- May 18: Jackie Cochran becomes the first woman to break the sound barrier.
- American Airlines puts a cap on their stewardesses' continued employment, terminating their service when women turn 32.

=== 1954 ===
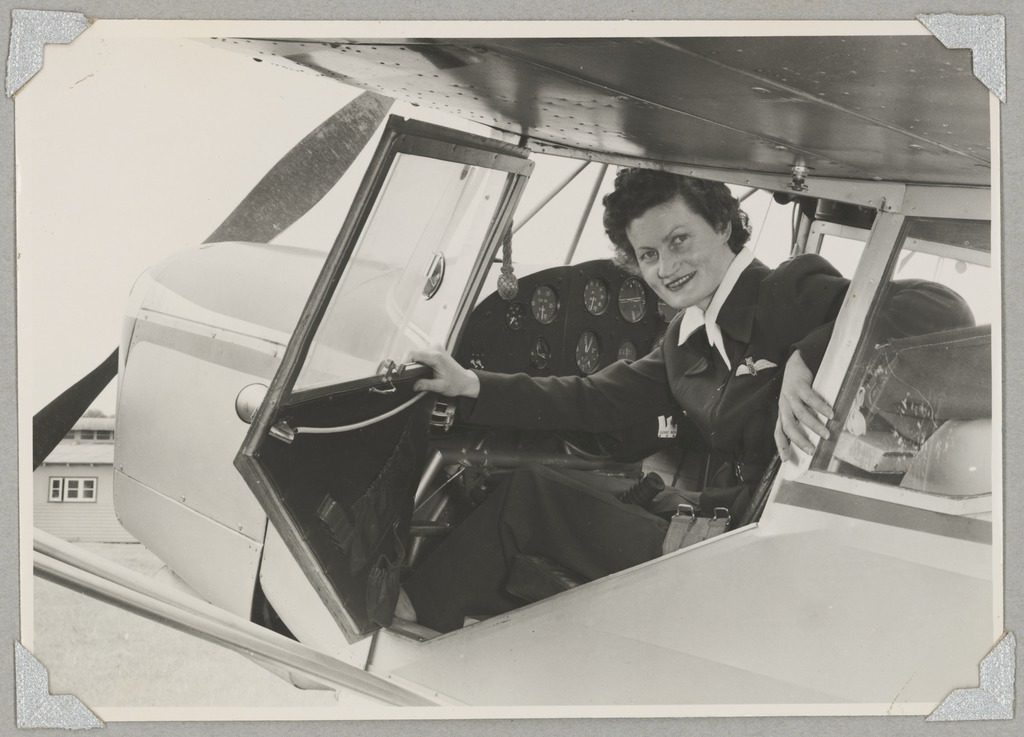
Australian Women Pilots' Association member Meg Cornwell in the cockpit of Auster J-5G Cirrus Autocar monoplane VH-ADY at an airfield, 1954

- Kim Kyung-Oh of Korea is promoted as a captain in the ROK Air Force, becoming the sole woman pilot involved in the Korean War for the South Koreans.

=== 1955 ===
- Jacqueline Auriol of France is the first Frenchwoman to earn a test pilot license.
- Jean Ross Howard Phelan founds the Whirly-Girls, an organization for women helicopter pilots.
- The British Women Pilots' Association (BWPA) is formed.

=== 1956 ===
- Ada Rogato is the first pilot to cross the Amazon rainforest solo using a single engine aircraft.
- Betty Greene is the first woman to fly in Sudan, having had to obtain a special dispensation from the Sudanese Parliament before a woman was allowed to fly.

=== 1958 ===
- Leman Altınçekiç is the first female accredited jet pilot in Turkish Air Force and NATO.
- February 11: Ruth Carol Taylor is the first African-American flight attendant, on a flight from Ithaca to New York City.
- Dorothy Rungeling is the first Canadian woman to solo pilot a helicopter.
- Letitia Chitty is the first woman admitted as a fellow of the Royal Aeronautical Society (FRAeS).

=== 1959 ===
- Molly Reilly is the first Canadian woman to become a civilian pilot.
- Based on the success of the Australian Women's Pilots' Association, Rhona Fraser and Ena Monk create the New Zealand Association of Women in Aviation (NZAWA).

=== 1960 ===
- Olga Tarling becomes the first woman air traffic controller in Australia.
- The New York State Commission Against Discrimination ruled against Capital Airlines for failing to hire an African-American woman, Patricia Banks, despite her meeting all job requirements. Because of the ruling, more airlines start hiring African American flight attendants in the United States.
- Yvonne Pope Sintes and Frankie O'Kane become the first female British air traffic controllers.
- Alia Menchari becomes the first woman Tunisian pilot.

=== 1961 ===
- Lucille Golas attains the first pilot license for a woman in Guyana to assist her husband in his mining business.

=== 1962 ===
- Jacqueline Cochran is the first woman to fly a jet across the Atlantic Ocean.
- Asegedech Assefa becomes the first Ethiopian woman to earn a pilot's license.

=== 1963 ===
- Valentina Tereshkova becomes the world's first woman to fly in space.
- Betty Miller is the first woman to fly solo across the Pacific Ocean.
- Anne Spoerry, French doctor living in Kenya, becomes the first female member of the African Medical and Research Foundation's "Flying Doctors".
- April 17: Eight stewardesses from the flight attendant union speak out against the policy of retiring stewardesses at age 32 during a press conference.

=== 1964 ===
- Geraldine Mock is the first woman to fly around the world.

=== 1965 ===
- Maria Georgieva Atanasova, a Bulgarian pilot, became the first woman to land a passenger plane at London's Heathrow Airport, which happened under extreme conditions.
- September 2: On Stewardesses' Day the US House of Representatives helps show "public disfavor with airline age discrimination".

=== 1967 ===
- The India's Women Pilot Association (IWPA) is formed with charter members, Chanda Sawant Budhabhatti, Mohini Shroff, Rabia Fatehally, Sunila Bhajekar and Durba Banerjee.

=== 1969 ===
- Kucki Low (née von Gerlach) obtains the first woman pilot's license in South West Africa, now Namibia.
- Turi Widerøe of Norway becomes the first female pilot for Scandinavian Airlines System.

=== 1970 ===
- Rosella Bjorson is the first Canadian commercial airline pilot.
- Beverly Roediger is the first woman to earn a commercial pilot license in Papua New Guinea.

=== 1971 ===
- Louise Sacchi sets a speed record flying a single-engine land plane from New York to London in 17 hours and 10 minutes.
- The Association Française des Femmes Pilotes is formed in France.

=== 1972 ===
- Yvonne Pope Sintes becomes Britain's first woman commercial airline pilot.

=== 1973 ===
- Kucki Low, Namibian pilot, is hired as the first woman commercial airline pilot in South Africa, flying for Namaqualand Airways.
- Bonnie Tiburzi is the first female pilot for American Airlines and the first female pilot for a major American commercial airline, as well as the first woman in the world to earn a Flight Engineer rating on a turbo-jet aircraft.
- The United States Navy allows women to train as pilots.

=== 1974 ===
- Mary Barr becomes the first woman pilot to work for the Forest Service in the United States.
- Emily Howell Warner becomes the first woman member of the Air Line Pilot's Association.

=== 1975 ===
- Yola Cain becomes the first Jamaican-born commercial pilot and flight instructor.

=== 1976 ===
- Emily Howell Warner becomes the first woman in the United States to work as an airline captain.
- Yola Cain becomes the first woman pilot hired by the Jamaica Defence Force.
- 9 September 1976 Asli Hassan Abade soloes her first flight as the only female pilot in the Somali Air Force.

=== 1977 ===
- September 2: Ten women graduate from UPT Class 77-08, earning their silver wings for the United States Air Force. The women who start and graduate are Connie Engel, Kathy LaSauce, Mary Donahue, Susan Rogers, Christine Schott, Sandra Scott, Victoria Crawford, Mary Livingston, Carol Scherer and Kathleen Rambo.
- September 16: The female crew set five world records on IL-62 airliner (CCCP-86453), including the world record of flight range without landing (11,074 km or 6,881 mi).
- November: President Carter signs a bill giving all former WASPs World War II veterans' status.
- Beverly Drake and Cheryl Pickering become the first two women pilots of the Guyana Defence Force.
- Beverley Drake of Guyana is the first female pilot of the Guyana Airways Corporation.
- Barbara Adams of Guyana becomes the first licensed woman helicopter pilot in her country and first black CPL pilot in the United Kingdom after training at Oxford Air training, England.

=== 1978 ===
- The first African American woman to fly for a commercial airline in the United States is Jill Brown-Hiltz when she joins Texas International Airlines as a pilot.
- The International Social Affiliation of Women Airline Pilots (later named the International Society of Women Airline Pilots or ISA) is formed as a social and professional organization.
- The Professional Women Controllers, Inc, is founded by Sue Townsend and Jacque Smith in Delaware. The organization advocates for diversity in air traffic control.
- Chinyere Kalu, (née Onyenucheya) becomes Nigeria's first female pilot.
- Judy Cameron becomes the first woman pilot hired by Air Canada.
- A group of former WASPs forms the Women's Military Pilots Association (WMPA).
- In January, Gráinne Cronin becomes the first woman to fly for Ireland's national carrier Aer Lingus.

=== 1979 ===
- November: Marcella Ng becomes the first African American to become a pilot in the US military.
- Maria Ziadie-Haddad is hired as the first woman pilot of Air Jamaica.
- Koh Chai Hong is the first woman pilot in the Republic of Singapore Air Force (RSAF).
- The United States Navy allows women to train as flight officers.

=== 1980 ===
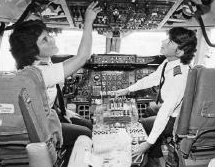
Beverly Burns and Lynne Rippelmeyer on the flight deck of a Boeing 737, September 1, 1982

- Lynn Rippelmeyer is the first woman to fly a Boeing 747.
- December 12: Aircraft manufacturer, Olive Ann Beech, is awarded the Wright Brothers Memorial Trophy from the U.S. National Aeronautic Association.

=== 1981 ===
- June: Mary Crawford becomes the first women's flight officer in the United States Navy.
- Olga Custodio becomes the first Hispanic female to graduate from the United States Air Force Undergraduate Pilot Training program and the first female T-38 Instructor Pilot at Laughlin AFB, Texas.
- Chinyere Kalu (née Onyenucheya) becomes Nigeria's first female commercial pilot.
- Yichida Ndlovu becomes the first civilian female pilot in Zambia.
- Patricia Denkler, the first woman to qualify in a jet aircraft, becomes the first woman to land a plane on an aircraft carrier.

=== 1982 ===
- April: Bahamian Patrice Washington graduates as the first black woman commercial pilot of the Embry–Riddle Aeronautical University.
- July: Lynn Rippelmeyer and Bev Burns become first B-737 Captains at People Express, fly flight as co-captains (see photo).

=== 1983 ===
- March 21: The first all-female Aircraft Carrier Landing. US Navy aircrew conducts C. O. D. operation mission! Lt Elizabeth Toedt, Aircraft Commander, Ltjg Cheryl A Martin, SIC, and Flight Crew AD3 Gina Greterman, and ADAN Robin Banks.
- April: Elizabeth Jennings Clark of St. Lucia is hired as the first female pilot for Leeward Islands Air Transport.
- November 16: American, Brooke Knapp, is the first person to land at McMurdo Station for a round the world flight and the first person to pilot a business jet over both the North and South Poles.
- Charlotte Larson becomes the first woman smoke jumper aircraft captain.
- Deanne Schulman becomes the first woman to be qualified as a smoke jumper.

=== 1984 ===
- Beverly Burns becomes the first woman to be the captain on a 747 cross-country trip.
- Lynn Ripplemeyer is the first captain of a 747 on a transatlantic flight.
- Khatool Mohammadzai is the first Afghan woman to become a paratrooper.
- Patrice Washington becomes the first woman pilot hired by Bahamasair.

=== 1986 ===
- December: Jeana Yeager First non-stop, un-refueled flight around the Earth: was made by Dick Rutan and Jeana Yeager in the Rutan Voyager over 9 days, 3 minutes and 44 seconds, flying from December 14 to 23, 1986.
- Beverley Bass becomes the first female captain of a commercial plane at American Airlines.
- Jenny Brearley of Australia is the first woman "elected to the committee of the Aircraft Owners and Pilots Association."
- Rebecca Mpagi joins Uganda's National Resistance Army as a pilot.
- June 11: The Women Soaring Pilots Association (WSPA) is founded in Tucson, Arizona, to support women in gliding.
- December 30: Beverley Bass captains the first all-female crew in the history of commercial jet aviation, on an American Airlines flight from Washington, D.C., to Dallas, Texas.

=== 1987 ===
- British Airways hires its first woman pilot, Lynne Barton.
- Erma Johnson becomes the first black and first woman chair of the Dallas/Fort Worth International Airport's Board of Directors.
- Continental Airlines "The first all-women crew to command a wide-bodied commercial aircraft touched down in Sydney yesterday – and they were on time. Captain Lennie Borenson, 39, first officer Dorothy Clegg, 26, and second officer Karlene Ciprtano, 25, taxied their Continental DC-10 to the terminal at 6am after leaving Hawaii about 8pm on Thursday (Sydney Time). The high flying trio were backed by 12 female cabin crew for the trip across the Pacific into aviation history."

=== 1988 ===
- Michele Yap of Jamaica becomes the first female airline captain in the Caribbean flying for Leeward Islands Air Transport.
- Sakhile Nyoni, a Zimbabwean, becomes the first woman pilot in Botswana.
- The Women's Military Pilots Association changes its name to the Women Military Aviators (WMA).
- Irish woman Gráinne Cronin becomes Aer Lingus's first female captain.

=== 1989 ===
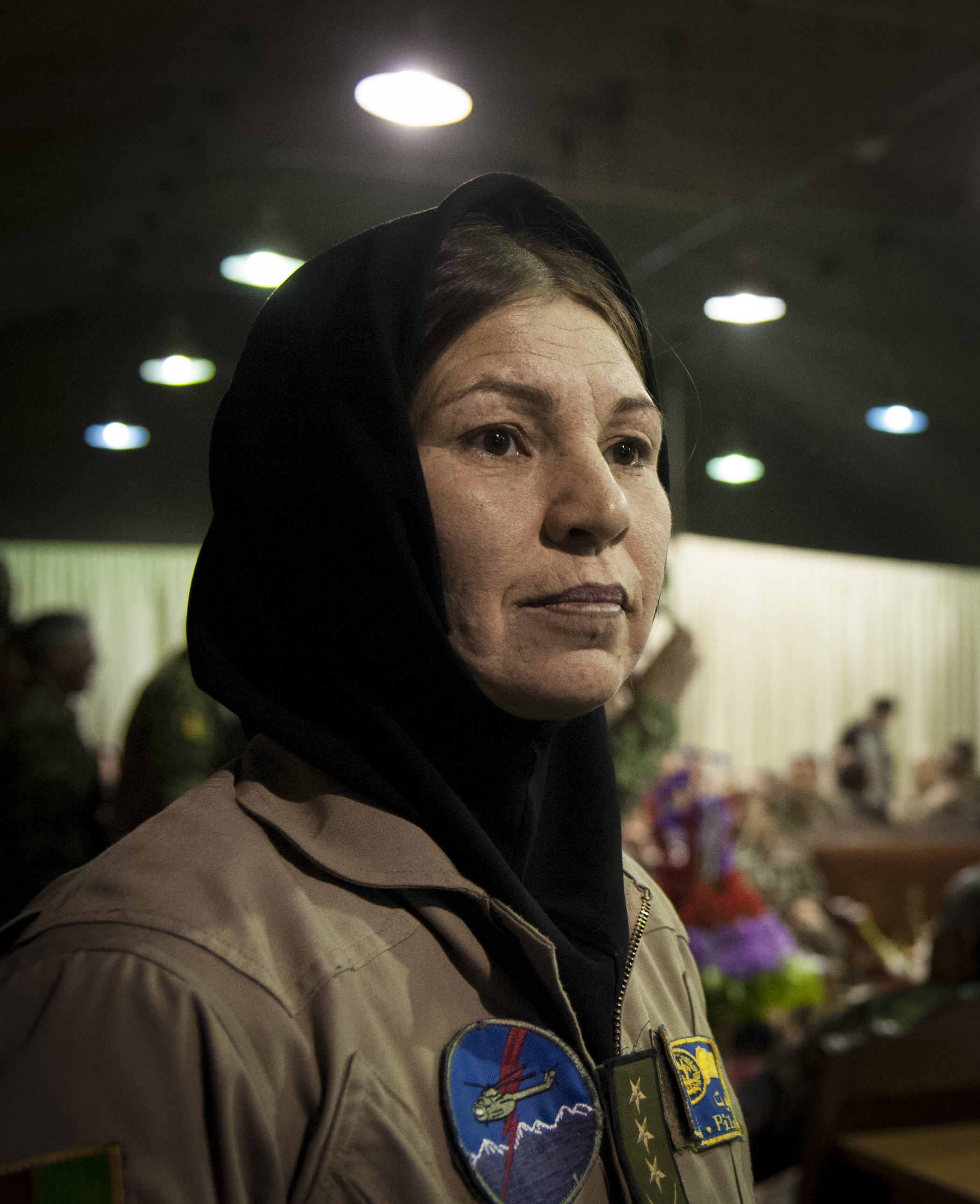
The first female Air Force helicopter pilot in Afghanistan's history, Col. Latifa Nabizada, exits the stage after speaking at an Afghan Air Force International Women's Day celebration at Kabul International Airport, March 7, 2013.

- Latifa Nabizada and her sister, Laliuma, become the first Afghan women admitted to military flight school.
- Deanne Brasseur and Jane Foster are the first women to fly military aircraft in Canada.
- The Fédération Aéronautique Internationale established the Pelagia Majewska medal in memory of the Polish record breaking glider pilot who died in an aviation accident in 1988.

=== 1990 ===
- Women in Aviation International (WAI) is first organized to help women advance their careers in aviation.
- Julie Ann Gibson and Sally Cox are the first career pilots in the Royal Air Force after the ban on female flying careers is lifted.
- January 1: Nivedita Bhasin of Indian Airlines becomes the youngest woman pilot in world civil aviation history to command a commercial jet aircraft at the age of 26. Capt Nivedita Bhasin pilots IC-492 on the Bombay-Aurangabad-Udaipur sector.
- US Air Force Captain and Instructor Pilot Eileen Isola becomes the first woman to serve as an Advance Agent to the President of the United States serving both Presidents Bush (41) and Clinton.
- Bahamian Patrice Washington becomes the first Black woman pilot to fly for United Parcel Service.

=== 1991 ===
- Patty Wagstaff is the first woman to earn the title of U.S. National Aerobatic Champion.
- Latifa Nabizada and her sister Lailuma graduate from helicopter flight school and become Afghanistan's first women pilots.
- Beverley Drake of Guyana is the first female accident investigator of the U.S. National Transportation Safety Board.
- The first Canadian Women in Aviation Conference is held. The conferences are held every two years by volunteers.
- July 31: The United States Senate votes "overwhelmingly" to allow American military women to fly aircraft in combat situations.

=== 1992 ===
- Judy Chesser Coffman, of the U.S. Navy, is the first female helicopter pilot to fly in Antarctica, in support of the National Science Foundation (NSF).
- Barbara Harmer completes her training and joins the Concorde fleet as the first woman to fly the supersonic airliner as a line pilot.
- Mette Grøtteland is the first woman fighter pilot in the Royal Norwegian Air Force after qualifying to fly the General Dynamics F-16 Fighting Falcon.

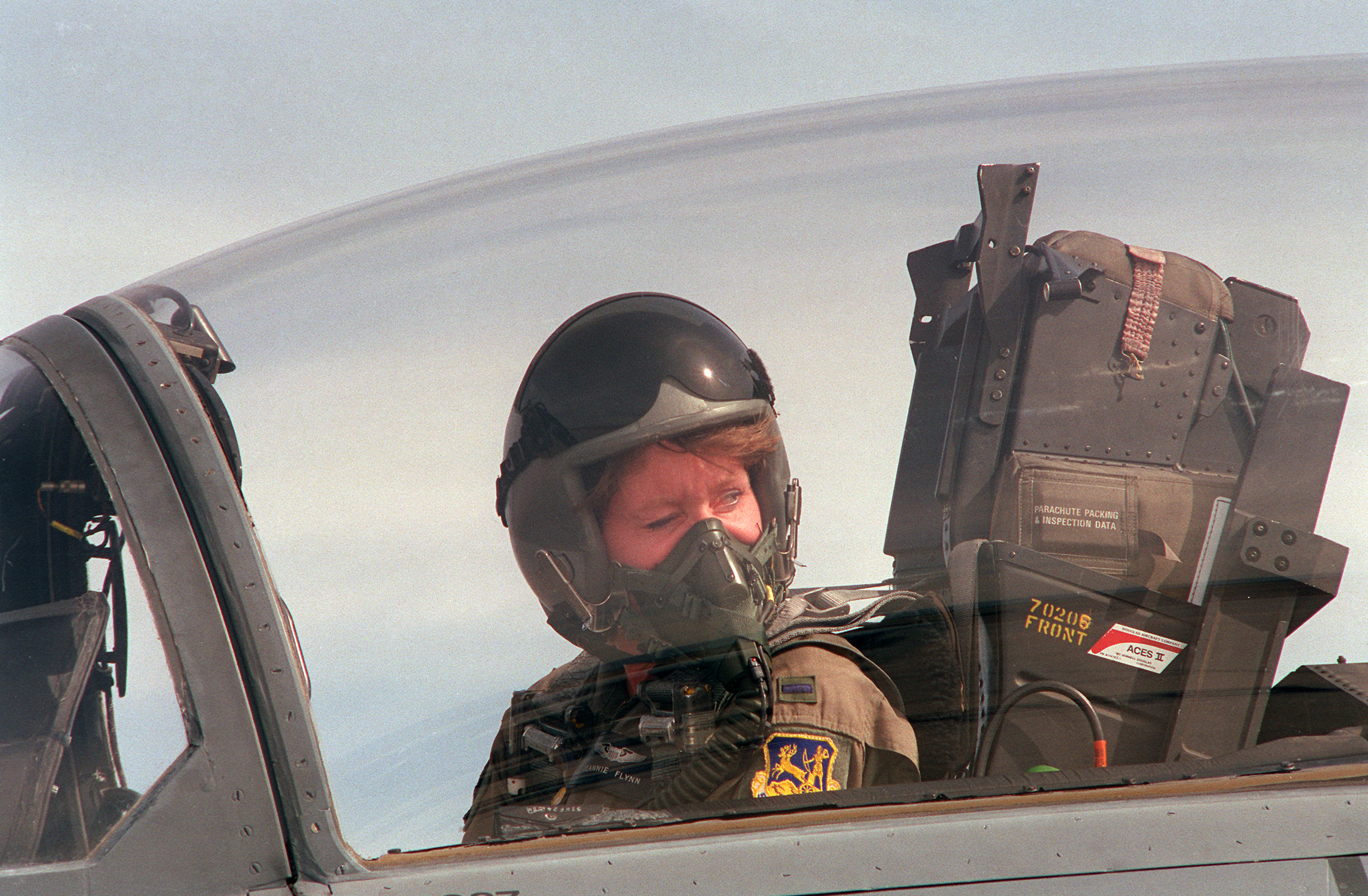
A close up of 1st Lt. Jeannie Flynn, the first F-15E female pilot, sits in the cockpit as she performs engine star.

- Veronica Foy becomes the first woman pilot of Malawi.
- Silva McLeod becomes the first Tongan woman to be a licensed pilot.

=== 1993 ===
- Jeannie Flynn becomes the first fighter pilot in the United States Air Forces.
- Barbara Harmer of England becomes the first woman to fly a supersonic airline jet.
- Nina Tapula becomes the first woman military pilot of Zambia.
- Aurora Carandang becomes the first woman captain for Philippine Airlines.
- Matice Wright becomes the first African American female flight officer in the United States Navy.
- Manja Blok becomes the first female combat ready fighter pilot in the Royal Netherlands Air Force and NATO and flies the General Dynamics F-16 Fighting Falcon over Bosnia enforcing the no fly zone.

=== 1994 ===
- September 2: Harita Kaur Deol is the first woman pilot to fly solo in the Indian Air Force. She flew in an Avro HS-748 at age 22.
- Jo Salter is declared combat ready by the Royal Air Force flying a Panavia Tornado in 617 Squadron becoming Britain's first female fighter pilot.
- December: Bahamian Patrice Washington becomes the first black woman captain of a major US air service.

=== 1995 ===
- First batch of women helicopter pilots commission into Indian Air Force in December 1995.
- During the fall of Srebrenica in 1995 the first female fighter pilot in the Royal Netherlands Air Force Manja Blok is the first to drop bombs on attacking Bosnian Serb positions while flying a General Dynamics F-16 Fighting Falcon.
- Felistas Matengo-Mkandawire becomes the first black woman pilot in Malawi, flying as first officer for Air Malawi.
- The Federation of European Women Pilots (FEWP) is founded in Rome.
- Eileen Collins became the first female pilot of the Space Shuttle in 1995 aboard STS-63, which involved a rendezvous between Discovery and the Russian space station Mir. In recognition of her achievement as the first female Shuttle Pilot, she received the Harmon Trophy. She was also the pilot for STS-84 in 1997.
- Sarah Deal becomes the United States Marine Corps' first female aviator.

=== 1996 ===
- May 11: Candi Kubeck becomes the first female captain to die in a commercial airplane crash, piloted ValuJet Flight 592 from Miami, Florida to Atlanta, Georgia.
- Maria Ziadie-Haddad becomes the first female airline captain in Jamaica.
- Chipo Matimba becomes the first woman to complete the Air Force of Zimbabwe's pilot training course.
- Hildegarde Ferrea, at age 99, becomes the oldest person to perform a skydive jump.

=== 1997 ===
- March: The Association for Women in Aviation Maintenance (AWAM) is formed.
- Jennifer Murray is the first woman to go around the world in a helicopter.
- Anne-Marie "Mie" Jansen becomes the first Belgian female fighter pilot, flying the General Dynamics F-16 Fighting Falcon.

=== 1998 ===
- Women fighter pilots in the United States military fly the first combat missions off aircraft carriers.
- Asnath Mahapa is the first African woman to become a pilot in South Africa.
- Nicole Chang Leng becomes the first woman pilot of the Seychelles.
- November: M'Lis Ward becomes the first African American woman to captain for a major U.S. commercial airline, United Airlines.
- December 17: Kendra Williams is credited as the first woman pilot to launch missiles in combat during Operation Desert Fox.
- Aysha Alhameli is the first Emirati woman pilot in the United Arab Emirates
- Barbara Cassani becomes the first woman to CEO a commercial airline, Go.

=== 1999 ===
- Caroline Aigle becomes the first woman to receive the French Air Force's fighter pilot wings. She is assigned to fly the Mirage 2000-5.
- Veronica Foy becomes the first woman captain of Malawi.
- Eileen Collins becomes the first female commander of the Space Shuttle.

=== 2000 ===
- Catherine Labuschagne is the first woman in South Africa qualified as a fighter pilot.
- Betty Mullis becomes the first woman and pilot in the United States Air Force to become a Brigadier General.

== 21st century ==
=== 2001 ===
- Susan Mashibe of Tanzania becomes the first FAA-certified pilot and mechanic of her country.
- Selase Yayra Agbenyefia of Ghana becomes her country's first female military helicopter pilot.
- Anastasia Gan becomes the first woman commercial airline pilot in Singapore when she joins SilkAir.
- Teresa Carvalho is the first Portuguese woman to pilot a commercial airliner.
- Roni Zuckerman becomes the first Israeli woman to qualify as a fighter pilot.

=== 2002 ===
- Christine Njeuma becomes the first woman pilot of Cameroon.
- Pioneering military pilots of the Uruguayan Air Force, María Eugenia Etcheverry and Carolina Arévalo, become the first two female South American fighter pilots, flying Cessna A-37B Dragonfly and FMA IA-58A Pucará respectively.
- Inka Niskanen becomes Finland's first female fighter pilot, flying F/A-18 Hornets.
- The Air Force of the Dominican Republic allows women to enter the military academy.

=== 2003 ===
- US Coast Guard pilot Sidonie Bosin is the first female aviation officer in charge of air crews in the Antarctic.
- Ayesha Farooq becomes Pakistan's first "war-ready female fighter pilot".
- Vernice Armour becomes the first African American combat pilot to fly during the Iraq War.
- Susan Mashibe of Tanzania founds Via Aviation as a fixed-base operator to support business jets and assist African clients with flight options, which do not require commercial air services and routing through Europe.
- Khoo Teh Lynn becomes Singapore's first fighter pilot.
- Ramona Palabrica-Go, the first female pilot in the Philippine Army, becomes the commanding officer of the Army Aviation Battalion.
- Astrid Deira becomes the first woman pilot of Suriname.
- January 10: The Brazilian Air Force opens up positions to women. There are 20 aviation slots and 150 women apply.
- August: Cheryl Stearns completes her 15,560th skydive, putting her at the "record for the most parachute jumps by a woman."

=== 2004 ===
- Irene Koki Mutungi of Kenya becomes Africa's first woman airline captain.
- The first all-female aviation company in Africa, SRS Aviation is started by a South African woman, Sibongile Sambo.

=== 2005 ===
- Hanadi Zakaria Al-Hindi becomes the first woman in Saudi Arabia to earn her pilot's license.
- Jeanine Menze becomes the first African American woman to earn the Aviation Badge in the United States Coast Guard.
- The first civilian all-female aerobatic team in the world is formed: Patrouille Tranchant, based in Avignon, France. They fly a formation of four Yak 54s. Flight leader: Sarah Mozayeni Bosworth.

=== 2006 ===
- July: Line Bonde becomes the first woman fighter pilot in Denmark.

=== 2007 ===
- Phetogo Molawa becomes the first black woman helicopter pilot in the South African Air Force and the South African National Defence Force.
- Nicole Chang Leng of the Seychelles becomes the first woman captain and the first woman to command an all-woman crew.
- Ulrike Flender graduates from Euro-NATO Joint Jet Pilot Training program to become Germany's first female fighter pilot.

=== 2008 ===
- Michelle Goodman is the first woman to be awarded the Distinguished Flying Cross.
- Ha Jeong-mi becomes the first South Korean female fighter pilot, flying the KF-16 fighter.
- Heather Bartlett, the only woman working for the U.S. Fish and Wildlife Service as both a pilot and law enforcement officer, earns her commercial pilot's license.
- Jessica Cox becomes the first armless pilot to fly solo: local flight, May 10, 2008, to and from San Manuel (E77), Arizona; on October 10, 2008, from San Manuel (E77) to P13 San Carlos Apache (P13) and back to E77 Sport Pilot checkride.

=== 2009 ===
- February 12: The first all-African American, female flight crew flies from Nashville to Atlanta round-trip.
- Virginie Guyot of France is the first woman to lead a national aerobatic team.
- Kimberly Anyadike, aged 15, becomes the youngest African-American woman to pilot a plane solo across the United States.
- Angela Swann-Cronin, the first Māori pilot in the Royal New Zealand Air Force retires after 13 years of service. She is of Ngati Porou/Rongowhakaata tribal affiliation.
- Patricia Mawuli Nyekodzi becomes the first woman in Ghana to earn a civilian pilot's license and the first certified Rotax engine mechanic in West Africa.
- Ângela Pedro Francisco becomes the first woman pilot of Mozambique.

=== 2010 ===
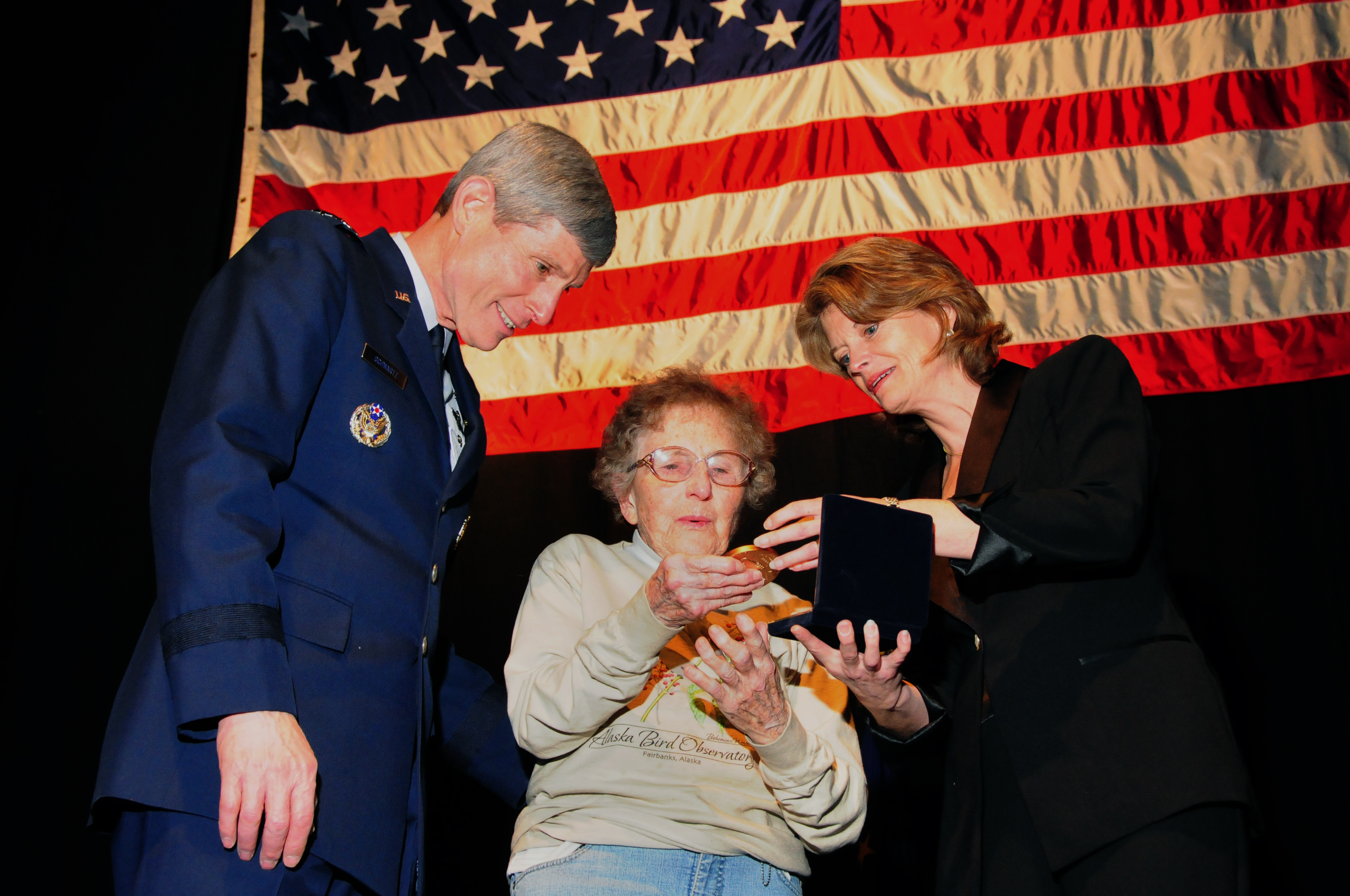
Nancy Lee Baker, longtime Fairbanks resident, receives a special honor from Sen. Lisa Murkowski and Chief of Staff of the Air Force, Gen. Norton A. Schwartz. Baker, a Women Airforce Service Pilot flew various military aircraft during World War II, her contributions help pave the way for the integration of female pilots into the military.

- July: Ari Fuji is the first woman captain in Japan, flying as captain for JAL Express.
- The women who worked as WASP pilots are given the Congressional Gold Medal by the United States Congress; more than 250 women attend the ceremony.
- Karina Miranda is the first female pilot from Chile to break the sound barrier.
- Catherine Labuschagne is the first woman to pilot a Gripen Jas 39C.
- Giselah Ebanks becomes the first Caymanian woman pilot, for Cayman Airways Express.
- L'Association Suisse des Femmes Pilotes is formed in Switzerland to support women in aviation and encourage networking.

=== 2011 ===
- Aluel James Bol becomes the first woman pilot in the newly created country of South Sudan.
- February: Johana Belén Santacruz becomes the first woman combat pilot in the Ecuadorean Air Force.
- March: The first Women of Aviation Worldwide Week is held.

=== 2012 ===
- February Maria Tejada-Quintana becomes the first woman of the Dominican Republic certified as a combat pilot.
- April: Astrid Deira becomes the first woman in Suriname to be the captain of a Boeing 737.
- Esther Mbabazi becomes the first woman pilot in Rwanda.
- Chinese pilot, Yu Xu, becomes the first woman to fly the J-10 fighter jet.
- Frances Smith, Gwendolyn Ritchie and Gayle Saunders all become the first women promoted to captain in Bahamasair.
- The Afghan Air Force starts training women pilots again. Sourya Saleh and Masooma Hussaini are trained as helicopter pilots. Niloofar Rahmani is trained as a fixed-wing military pilot, the first Afghan woman in the military to fly planes.
- Sakhile Nyoni-Reiling becomes the first woman General Manager of government-owned Air Botswana.
- Czarena Hashim becomes the first woman airline captain in both Royal Brunei Airlines and Southeast Asia.
- Katarzyna Tomiak becomes a MiG-29 fighter pilot in the Polish Air Force.
- Andrea Deyling is the first licensed Zeppelin pilot in the United States.

=== 2013 ===
- Flora Ngwilinji becomes the first woman pilot of the Malawi Defence Force.
- May: Kavistha Maharaj becomes the first black, and first Indian South African woman to captain for South African Airways.
- July: The first women paratroopers in Pakistan complete their training with Captain Kiran Ashraf the best of the 24 graduates.
- The largest head-down freefly formation with only women is accomplished in Arizona with 63 women from the United States, Canada, Mexico, England, France and Russia.

=== 2014 ===
- Saudi Arabia allows their first woman pilot, Hanadi Al-Hindi, to fly in Saudi airspace.
- Mariam al-Mansuri is the United Arab Emirates' first female fighter pilot, flying General Dynamics F-16 Fighting Falcons in combat missions against ISIS in Syria.
- Nicola Scaife of Australia is the winner of the first Women's Hot Air Balloon Championship.
- Astrid Deira becomes the first female captain in Suriname, flying her inaugural flight on a Boeing 737.

=== 2015 ===
- Myriam Adnani becomes the first Muslim woman pilot in Europe.
- Ethiopian Airlines has its first flight "operated by an all-female crew".
- Siza Mzimela, South African entrepreneur, founds the first airline, Fly Blue Crane, created by a black woman.
- Ouma Laouali of Niger becomes the first female pilot to serve in the Niger Armed Forces.
- Selai Saumi becomes the first woman from Fiji to captain a commercial airline.

=== 2016 ===
- January: Ellen Chiweshe is appointed as the first woman air commodore in the Air Force of Zimbabwe.
- February 23: The first all women flight team of Royal Brunei Airlines flies from Brunei International to Jeddah in conjunction with Brunei's 32nd National Day. The group includes Captain Czarena Hashim, first officers Dk Nadiah Pg Khashiem and Sariana Nordin.
- June 18: The first female Indian fighter pilots graduate. These include Bhawana Kanth, Avani Chaturvedi and Mohana Singh.
- September 19th: Wang Zheng (Julie Wang, Chinese: 王争) is the first Chinese person to fly a single-engine airplane solo around the world. She’s Also the first Asian woman to fly around the world.
- December: EasyJet announces that they have doubled the number of new entrant woman pilots to their company via the Amy Johnson flying initiative.
- Singapore Airlines hires woman pilots for the first time.
- Penny Khull, becomes the first woman to qualify as a NH90 helicopter pilot in the Royal New Zealand Air Force.
- Yolanda Kaunda becomes the first black woman captain from Malawi.

=== 2018 ===
- Misa Matsushima becomes the first female fighter pilot in the Japan Air Self-Defense Force.

=== 2019 ===
- Aarohi Pandit becomes the first woman pilot in the world to fly solo across the Atlantic Ocean, Pacific Ocean and Greenland ice sheets in a light sport aircraft.

=== 2022 ===
- First all-black, all-female crew operate regular American Airlines commercial flight August 20, 2022, from Dallas to Phoenix to celebrate the 100th anniversary of Bessie Coleman being the first African American woman to obtain a commercial pilot's license in 1921 and for performing the first public flight by an African American woman in 1922. Coleman's great niece, Gigi Coleman, was the guest of honor on the commemorative flight.

=== 2024 ===
- Cathy Babis becomes the first woman to circumnavigate Australia in a seaplane.
- Female pilot of US Navy F/A-18F Super Hornet shoot down Houthi drone and becomes first US female aviator successfully destroyed an aerial target in air-to-air combat during Red Sea crisis.
- Ekaterina Rakhimova becomes first woman flies as navigator on MiG-31 supersonic interceptor aircraft of Russian Air Force.

=== 2025 ===
- Lieutenant Kataryna in the Ukrainian Air Force is recognized as only female combat helicopter pilot, flies on Mi-8 helicopter and completed over 30 combat missions during Russian invasion of Ukraine.
- Indian Air Force female pilots played significant role during Operation Sindoor.
- At least 16 Israeli Air Force female fighter pilots and navigators actively participated on Operation Rising Lion against Iran.

== See also ==
- Early Australian female aviators
- List of firsts in aviation
- Women in aviation
- History of women in aviation in Saudi Arabia
