= Chipo Matimba =

First woman Air Force pilot in Zimbabwe

Chipo M. Matimba (born ca. 1974) is a pioneering Zimbabwean aviator and commercial pilot. Matimba is recognized as the first woman pilot to fly for the Air Force of Zimbabwe and one of the country's earliest commercial pilots. Matimba, along with fellow Zimbabwean female pilot Elizabeth Simbi Petros piloted the first all-female crewed flight for Air Zimbabwe, flying from Harare to Victoria Falls.

== Biography ==
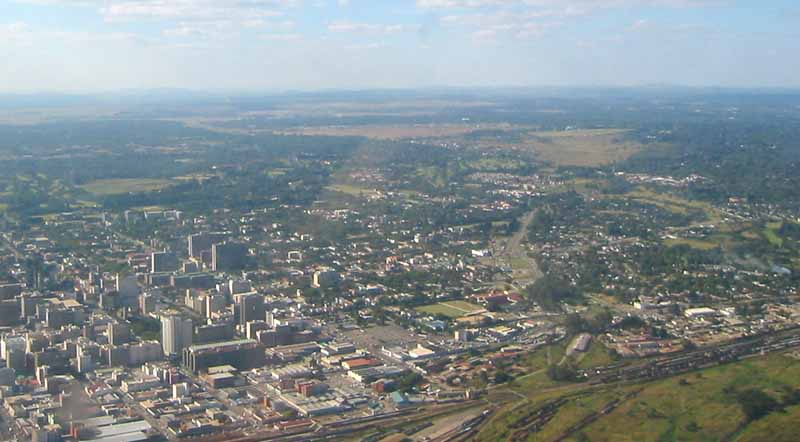
Zimbabwe's capital city Harare, the birthplace of Chipo Matimba

Matimba grew up in the Belvedere suburbs of Harare. She was one of nine children born to a dressmaker, who became a single mother when Matimba's father died when she was ten years old.

In 1994, Matimba became one of Zimbabwe's first women pilots after seeing an advertisement recruiting pilots to the Zimbabwean Air Force. After noticing the recruitment advert had no gender restrictions, she sought to apply. She was selected as one of 10 successful applicants to the programme, out of thousands of applicants.

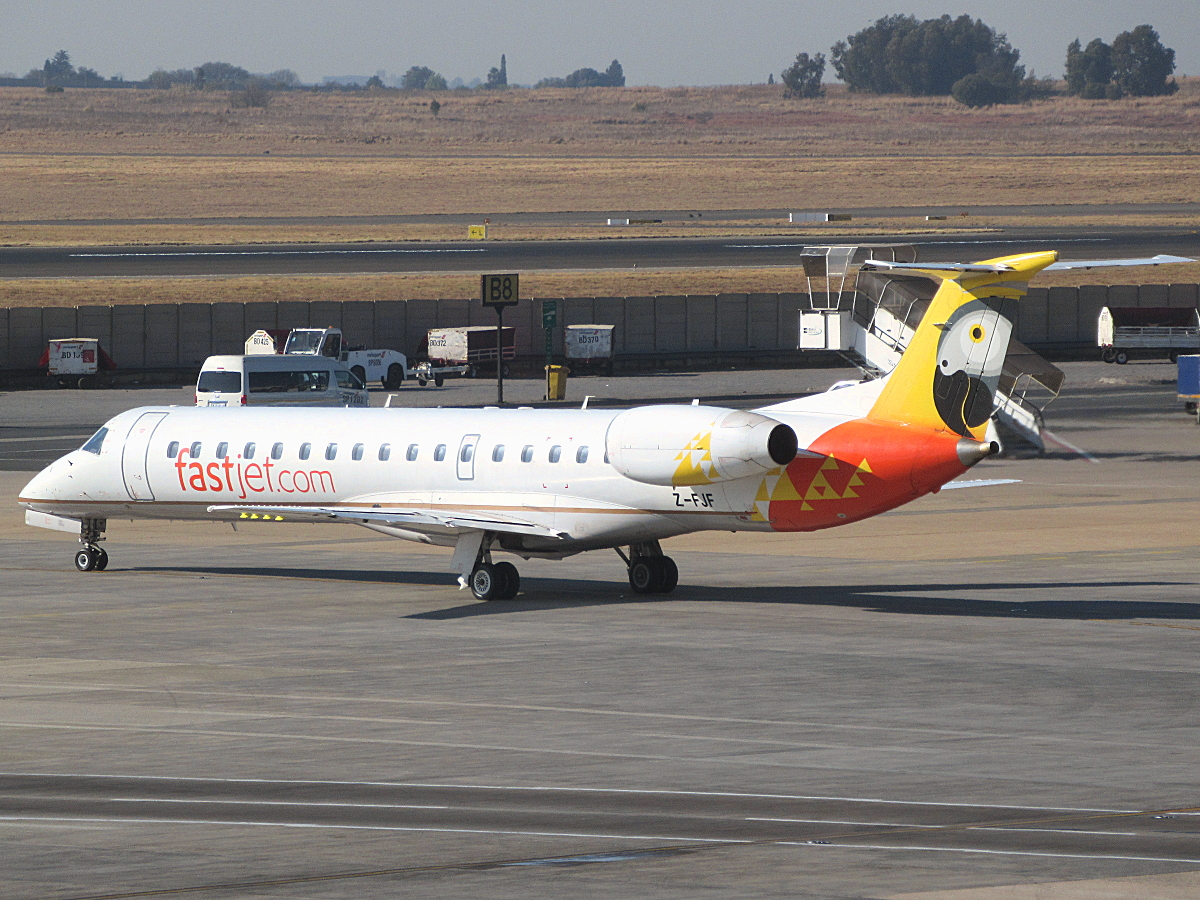
Matimba currently flies for Fastjet Zimbabwe

Matimba earned her wings in 1996, becoming the Air Force's first female combat pilot two years later. After leaving the military, she became one of the only women pilots for Air Zimbabwe, where she served as a captain flying the Airbus A320.

In 2015, she and fellow female aviator Elizabeth Simbi Petros became the first women pilots to fly a Boeing 737 from Harare to Victoria Falls as part of the country's first all-female flight crew. As of 2016, Matimba was one of only six female pilots for Air Zimbabwe.

In 2018, Matimba left Air Zimbabwe to fly for Fastjet. In 2021, Matimba piloted another all-female crewed flight for Fastjet, this time flying from Harare to Johannesburg in honor of International Women's Day.

== See also ==
- List of firsts in aviation
- Women in aviation
- Timeline of women in aviation
