= Cheryl Pickering-Moore =

Pilot (born 1950)

- Born: Cheryl Pickering; 14 December 1950 (age 75); Georgetown, Guyana
- Other names: Cheryl Moore
- Occupation: Pilot
- Years active: 1977–present
- Known for: First woman pilot for the Guyana Defence Force

Cheryl Pickering-Moore (born 14 December 1950) was one of the first two women to fly as a pilot for the Guyana Defence Force and a pioneer aviator in her native Guyana. In 2013, she was recognised in Guyana with a postage stamp issued with her likeness.

== Early life ==
Cheryl Pickering was born on 14 December 1950 in Georgetown, Guyana, to Pearl and Layard Pickering. As the fifth of eight children in her family, she grew up in the Kitty neighbourhood of Georgetown, attending Comenius Moravian Primary School. She then continued her education at St. Joseph High School.

== Career ==
In 1968, after graduating from high school, Pickering became a student teacher at Malgre Tout Government School in Demerara. The following year, she transferred with the Ministry of Education to serve as a secretarial typist in the Faculty of Law at the University of Guyana. In 1973, Pickering joined the Guyana Defence Force as a personal assistant to the Commanding Officer, Ulric Pilgrim. The following year, she became a Second Lieutenant, one of the few women officers in the Women's Army Corps. In 1975, she served as one of the colour guard for the visit at the Timehri International Airport of the first female prime minister, Sirimavo Bandaranaike of Sri Lanka.

Pickering began attending social work classes at the University of Guyana where she heard that government scholarships, offered in conjunction with International Women's Year, were available for women to attend flight training school. She applied and was selected. along with Beverley Drake and ten men, to attend Embry-Riddle Aeronautical University in Daytona Beach, Florida. The curriculum included aerodynamics, aircraft performance and systems, flight planning, maintenance, meteorology and navigation, as well as Instrument Flight Rules (IFR) and Visual Flight Rules (VFR) training. She completed her training and earned her commercial pilot's licence, though upon returning to Guyana she had to complete training to convert her licence to a local licence.

Upon completion of her training, Pickering was hired as one of the first two-woman pilots of the Guyana Defence Force, flying Britten-Norman Islanders in 1977. That same year, she married Stanley Moore and the young couple moved to the Campbellville neighbourhood of Georgetown. In the Air Corps, Pickering-Moore was promoted to serve as the Executive Officer of the corps and flew Avro, Bombardier Dash 8, Britten-Norman Islander, and Twin Otter planes to transport soldiers and supplies.

In 1980, Pickering-Moore was transferred to the government-owned Guyana Airways, where she flew as a commercial pilot. Primarily her flights took her to local destinations, but periodically she flew to Barbados or Trinidad. In 1989, she left Guyana Airways and began flying with Leeward Islands Air Transport (LIAT) in Antigua. She obtained licensing to fly bigger planes, such as the Hawker Siddeley HS 748 and though based jointly in Antigua and Barbados, she routinely flew throughout the Eastern Caribbean, as well as to the Dominican Republic, Puerto Rico and to Venezuela.

In addition to flying, Pickering-Moore raised her five children and obtained a degree in Business Administration from the American InterContinental University. She retired from flying in 2013 and began working as a volunteer with women's and children's ministries in Barbados. In 2007, she was one of those honoured for International Women's Day celebrations of the 40th Anniversary Women's Army Corps. In 2013, Pickering-Moore and other pioneer aviators of Guyana were honoured with their likenesses being featured on postage stamps.
