= Sakhile Nyoni =

Zimbabwean-born pilot

- Occupation: Pilot
- Known for: First female pilot in Botswana

Sakhile Nyoni-Reiling is a Zimbabwean-born pilot living in Botswana. She was the first female pilot in Botswana and the first woman to serve as general manager of Air Botswana.

In 1988, Nyoni became the first female pilot in Botswana, working for Air Botswana. In 2011, she became the first woman to serve as general manager of Air Botswana.
