= Lynn Barton =

British female pilot

Lynn Barton (born 1956) is a British aviator who was the first female pilot employed by British Airways in 1987. In 2008, She was the first pilot to fly an aircraft into London Heathrow Terminal 5.

== Early life ==
She had her first flying lesson at the age of 16.

== Career ==
=== British Airways ===
She started flying the Boeing 747 with British Airways and duly became the airline's first female pilot on 31 October 1987, aged 30. She was part of the crew featured in a BBC documentary ‘Jet Jockeys’, following a flight from Heathrow to Bangkok & Sydney. Two other female pilots also joined BA around this time and flew smaller airliners. Within a year, sixty of the airline's three thousand pilots were female. She became a British Airways Captain in 1996 and retired in 2016.

In 2008, BA had around 170 female pilots.

In 2021, it was reported that the newly reopened Concorde lounges at London Heathrow and New York JFK would feature the Barton cocktail, named for Lynn Barton.

== Personal life ==
She lives with her husband in Hampshire. She married Michael Ellis in Hampshire in November 1996.

On 17 May 2022, Barton appeared as an unsuccessful contestant on ITV's Beat the Chasers, revealing that she was once the subject of a question on The Chase.

== See also ==
Cat Burton
