= Lydia Zvereva =

Pioneering Russian aviator

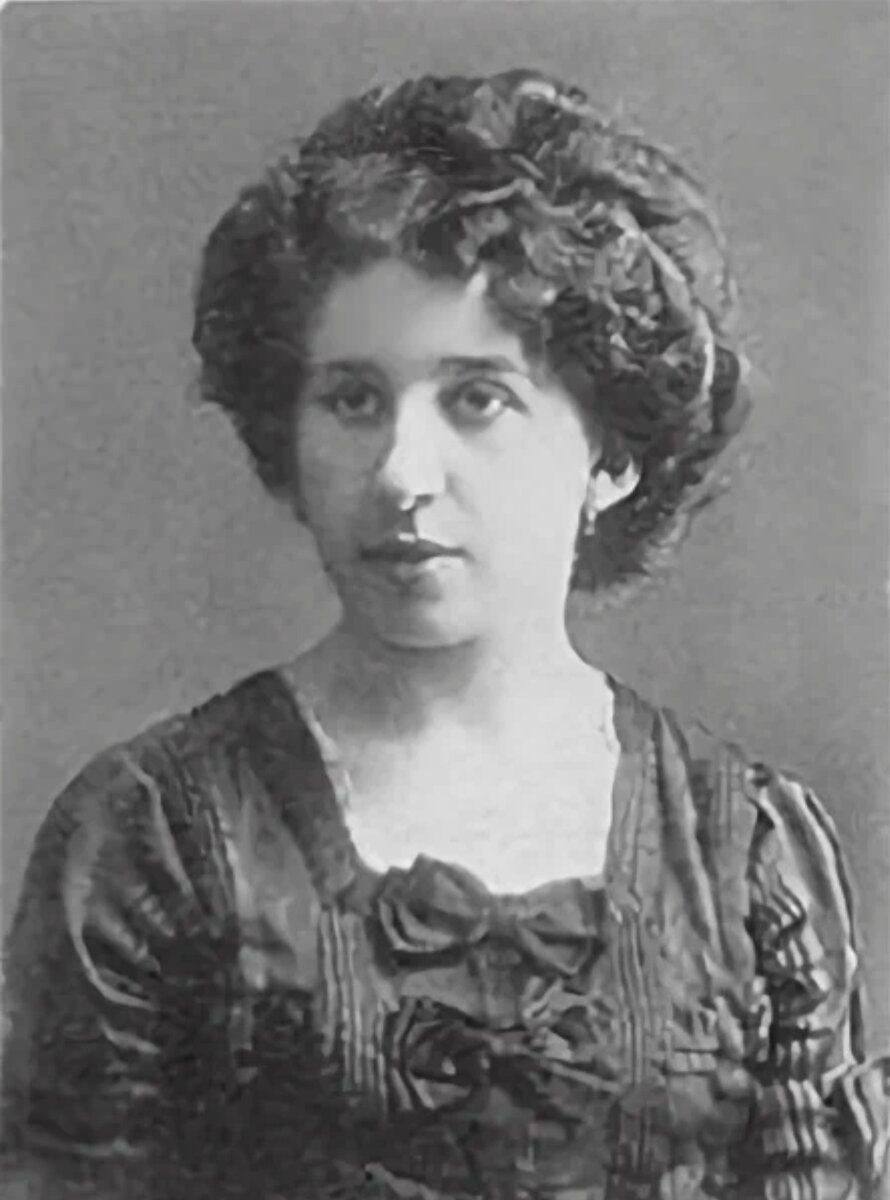
- Lidiya Zvereva in 1911
- Born: Lydia Vissarionovna Zvereva; 13 August 1890; Saint Petersburg, Russian Empire
- Died: 1 May 1916 (aged 25); Petrograd, Russian Empire (now Saint Petersburg, Russia)
- Known for: First female licensed pilot in Russia

Lydia Vissarionovna Zvereva (13 August 1890 – 1 May 1916) was a Russian aviation pioneer who is credited with being the first woman in Russia to earn a pilot's license. Although she only lived to the age of 25, Zvereva is recognized for her feats as a female aviator. She competed in air shows in Eastern Europe, and later, with her husband Vladimir Victorovich Slusarenko, Zvereva operated an aircraft manufacturing factory in Riga.

== Early life ==
Born in Saint Petersburg in 1890 into a military family, Zvereva was educated at the Czar Nicholas I Institute for Girls. In 1910, a succession of exhibits held in Russia assembled French and German pilots while promoting an enthusiasm for aviation in the Russian public. One pioneering French pilot active in the events, Raymonde de Laroche, broke barriers as the world's first woman licensed to fly, and hence encouraged other women to participate in the field of aviation, including Zvereva.

== Flying career ==
The following year, on 22 August 1911 (10 August on the old style Russian calendar), Zvereva earned certificate No. 31 from the Russian Aviation Association Flying School in Gatchina, recognizing her as the first Russian woman to earn a pilot's license and the eighth woman overall.

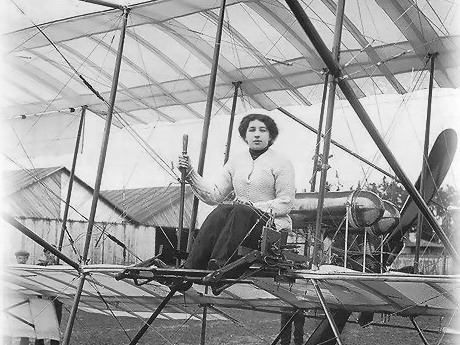
Lidiya Zvereva in 1911

For a while, Zvereva partnered with sportsman and aviator E. Spitzberg in air shows throughout Eastern Europe, flying in a Farman IV for high-altitude competitions. Several events, however, forbade Zvereva from participating or demanded excessively high entry fees. Such occurrences and the burden of traveling to exhibits led her to consider establishing an aircraft manufacturing factory with Vladimir Victorovich Slusarenko, her husband and former flight instructor. With the help of motorist Fjodor Kalep, Zvereva and Slusarenko signed a governmental contract to organize a repair workshop and training school in Riga; by mid-1914, the organization produced ten Farman XVI aircraft.

Following the outbreak of the First World War, the operation relocated and expanded in Saint Petersburg where Farmans and Morane-type aircraft were mass manufactured. Zvereva infrequently test flew modified aircraft, mainly to evaluate the mechanics of the newer models.

On 19 May 1914, Zvereva, in a Morane monoplane, performed aerobatics in front of a sold-out crowd in the hippodrome in Riga. For the occasion, she executed a loop – the first female aviator to execute such a maneuver – much to the astonishment of the spectators.

== Death ==
However, in April 1916, Zvereva contracted typhoid fever; she died on 1 May at the age of 25. "She was buried in Alexander Nevski Monastery while an aerial formation flew over the cemetery in her honor".
