= Gráinne Cronin =

Irish pilot

- Born: c. 1955; Ennis, County Clare
- Known for: First woman pilot for Aer Lingus

Gráinne Cronin (born about 1953) was the first woman to become a pilot for Aer Lingus and the first woman pilot commercially employed in Ireland.

== Life ==
Born to pilot captain Felim Cronin in Ennis, County Clare, Cronin's sister Caroline is also a commercial pilot. Her husband is also a pilot and her daughters Alana and Louisa Johnston both hold private pilot licenses, and Louisa has a commercial license. Cronin learned to fly while she was at university in her father's Piper Cub. Rather than teach her to fly, her father asked his first officer Neil Johnston to do so. Johnston taught her to fly and Cronin later married him. She lives in Malahide, Ireland.

== Career ==
When Cronin first joined Aer Lingus in 1975, at the age of 22, it was as a flight attendant. But by the time she was 24, she had undertaken over a year's worth of flight training in Oxford and was hired as a pilot by Aer Lingus in 1977. Her first flight in their employ was in January 1978. Initially working as a co-pilot, in 1988 she was promoted to became the airline's first female captain.

On 2 August 1988, Captain Grainne Cronin and co-pilot Elaine Egan flew as the first Aer Lingus all woman crew between Dublin and Shannon.

Cronin retired on 25 May 2010, making her final flight from Dublin to Boston flying once again with Captain Elaine Egan, accompanied first officer Shelly Gahan, in an Airbus A330. At the time of her retirement, 43 of the 475 pilots at Aer Lingus were women.

SAS were the first European airline to hire a woman pilot and Aer Lingus was the second. Within the next two years they had hired another two women. Though it seems to have taken a long time to get to this point, British Airways didn't hire their first woman pilots for about another 6 years.
