= Patrice Washington =

Bahamian airplane pilot (born 1961)

- Born: Patrice Francise Clarke; 11 September 1961; Nassau, The Bahamas
- Other names: Patrice Clarke Washington
- Occupation: pilot
- Years active: 1982-present
- Known for: first black female pilot hired by UPS

Patrice Washington (born 1961) is a Bahamian airplane pilot, whose career was marked by a series of firsts. She was the first black woman graduate of Embry–Riddle Aeronautical University in Daytona Beach, Florida; first woman pilot of Bahamasair; first black woman captain of a major U.S. air service and first black female pilot hired by the United Parcel Service.

== Early life ==
Patrice Francise Clarke was born on 11 September 1961 in Nassau, The Bahamas to Peggy Ann and Nathaniel Clarke. From the age of five, when she took her first flight, Clarke was interested in aviation. Raised by a single, divorced mother, along with her two sisters, Clarke learned responsibility at a young age. During her high schooling in Nassau she participated in career week activities hoping to become a stewardess, by the time she graduated, she had dreams of becoming a pilot. In 1979, intent on her goal, Clarke enrolled in the Embry–Riddle Aeronautical University of Daytona Beach, Florida, despite the fact that she was the only black student and spoke only Bahamian Creole. In April 1982, Clarke graduated as the first black woman in the school's history with a BS in aeronautical science and her commercial pilot's certification.

== Career ==
Soon after her graduation, Clarke began working at a charter company, Trans Island Airways, in the Bahamas, as a pilot. She continued her studies and was able to earn her qualifications to fly Boeing 737 and Boeing 747-8 aircraft over the next few years. In 1984, Clarke became the first woman pilot of Bahamasair, when she was hired as a First Officer by the air service. Though often facing discrimination Clark persevered and in 1988, she was hired by United Parcel Service (UPS) as a flight engineer. Her three-person crew flew routes from Louisville, Kentucky to Anchorage, Alaska, as well as to Australia and Cologne, Germany. In 1990, Washington was promoted to First Officer with UPS.

In 1994, Clarke married Ray Washington, a pilot for American Airlines. In December 1994, she was promoted to captain by UPS, becoming the first black female, and one of only eleven female captains, to command planes for a major U.S. airline.

== Legacy ==
In 1995, Washington and other female pilots founded the Bessie Coleman Foundation with the purpose of preserving Coleman's legacy, promoting the aviation profession among African American men and women, and providing a network for mentoring women in the airline sector. In 2000, Washington was presented with the Trumpet Award from Turner Broadcasting for her pioneering work in aviation on behalf of women.
