= Mary Chance VanScyoc =

American air traffic controller

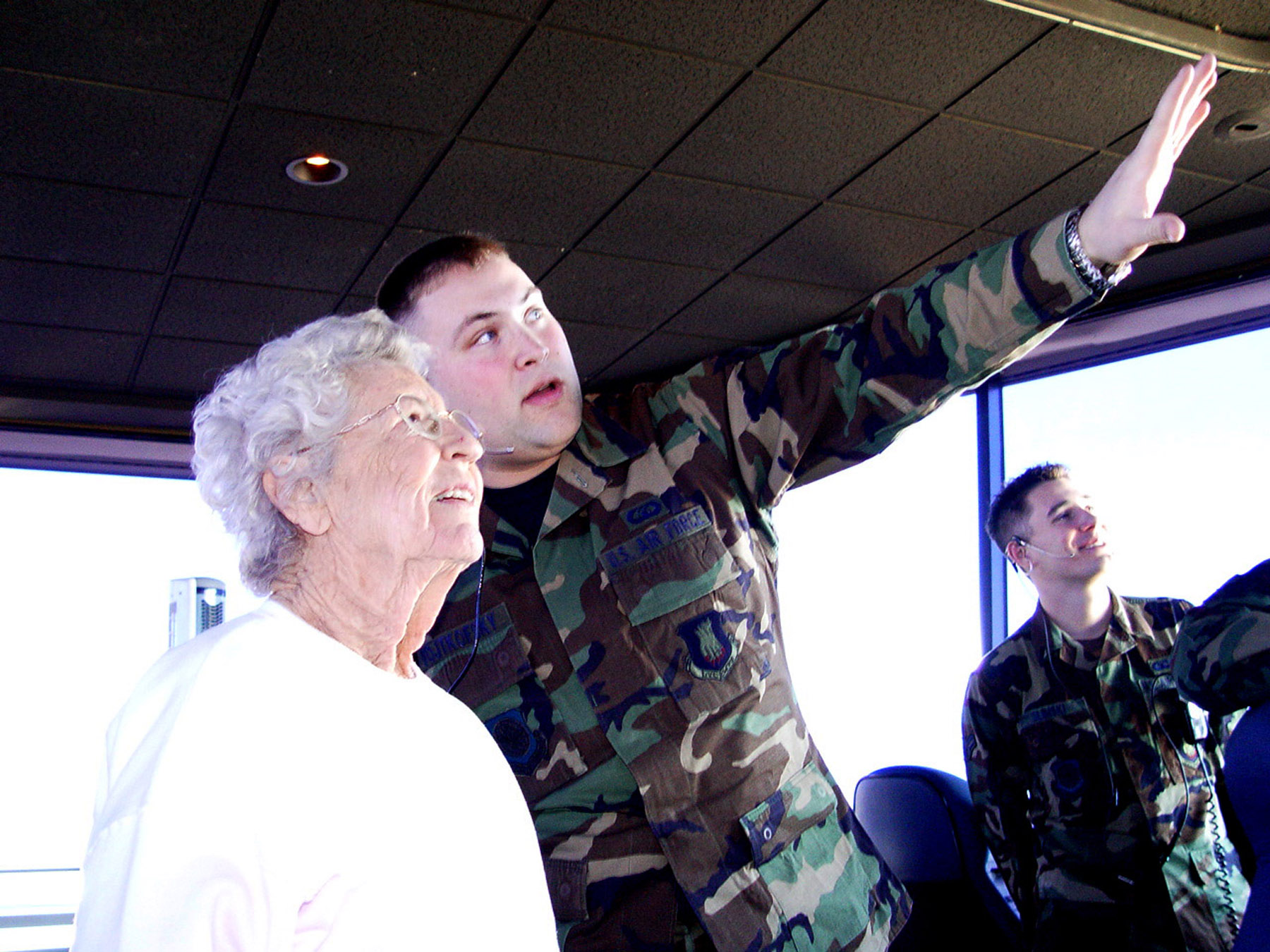
- Senior Airman Robert Vojtkofsky, 22nd Operations Support Squadron air traffic controller, shows Mary Chance VanScyoc, the first civilian, female air traffic controller in the United States, around McConnell’s air traffic control tower Feb. 28, 2007.
- Born: December 26, 1919; Wichita, Kansas
- Died: February 9, 2011 (aged 91)
- Education: Wichita State University
- Occupation: air traffic controller
- Spouse: Evart VanScyoc

Mary Chance VanScyoc (December 26, 1919 – February 9, 2011) was an air traffic controller in the United States. She was one of the first women, and often considered the very first civilian woman, to become an air traffic controller when she started in June 1942.

== Biography ==
VanScyoc was born in Wichita, Kansas and grew up in the Riverside area. VanScyoc first flew in an airplane, with Clyde Cessna, in 1935 and she "fell in love with flying." She saved money for flying lessons from her baby-sitting job and finally soloed in 1938.

VanScyoc attended Wichita State University as the first woman aviation student at the school. During her time at Wichita State, she participated and won the Women's State Rifle Championship in 1938. She graduated in 1941. After graduating, she taught for about a year in Ford, Kansas before she saw that jobs had opened up for women in air traffic control. She already had the required pilot's license and a college degree, so she applied and was given a job.

In June 1942, VanScyoc began on the job training at the Denver Airway Traffic Control Center and started working on her own in July. VanScyoc began working the "B" board in the Denver tower which communicated with air bases, flight stations, airline operators and pilots with filed flight plans. Data collected at the "B" board needed to get to the "A" board quickly where information was "plotted on strips of paper." VanScyoc quickly moved the "A" board. There was no radar and no computers, so there was no way of verifying information collected from the "B" board: air traffic controllers estimated time of arrival by calculating speed and other variables. During her time in Denver, she earned her commercial pilot's license.

In 1944, VanScyoc began to work air traffic control in Wichita. She took part in training assistant controllers and also earned her flight instructor rating in November 1944. In 1945, VanScyoc had to shut down all traffic coming into the airport when a hangar caught fire. In 1947, VanSycoc left air traffic control and concentrated on working as a flight instructor.

In June 1947, she met her future husband, Evart VanScyoc, and they later married and moved to Augusta, Kansas. She and her husband raised three children and during that time she taught Physical Education and Aviation at the Augusta High School. VanScyoc also worked for some time as a Juvenile Probation Officer. After the death of her son and her husband in the mid-1970s, she moved back to Wichita.

In Wichita, she continued to fly, taking helicopter lessons and soloing at age 64. She also drove for the Red Cross, and volunteered at the Kansas Aviation Museum. At age 74, she flew a World War II bomber. In 1996, she released a book about her life and experiences called A Lifetimes of Chances (ISBN 9780964906501). In 2002, VanScyoc was inducted into the Kansas Aviation Hall of Fame.
