= Ruthy Tu =

British-trained Chinese aviator

- 杜光照
- Ruthy Tu, 1955 in Taiwan
- Died: 1969
- Other name: Tu Guan-chiao
- Occupation: aviator

Ruthy Tu (Chinese: 杜光照; pinyin: Dù Guāngzhào; ?-1969, also known as Tu Guan-chiao or Rosie Du) was a British-trained Chinese aviator who was one of the most prominent Chinese fliers in the 1930s. In 1932, she became the first Chinese woman to earn a pilot's license and the first woman to join the Chinese Army as a pilot.

Tu later moved to Taiwan and became the first woman in that country to join the Baháʼí Faith in 1952, along with two men. She was active in the Baháʼí Assembly in Taiwan until her death in 1969.
