= Asnath Mahapa =

South African aviator

Asnath Mahapa (born October 1979) is a South African pilot. She has flown for United Nations Red Cross and World Food Programme in Central and West Africa. Recently, she was appointed as a spokesperson for Cell C Take a Girl Child to Work Day campaign.

== Early years ==
Mahapa was born and brought up in Limpopo, Rosenkraans, GaMatlala a province in the northern part of South Africa.In her first year of study at University of Cape Town, she dropped out to join the flight school.

== Career ==
In March 1998, Mahapa began her training as a pilot in Polokwane at G&L Aviation. In that same year, she later moved to Progress Flight Academy to finish obtaining her private pilot's license. On 8 October 1999, she acquired her commercial license and since then has worked with renowned organisations. In 2001, she joined the South African Air Force and worked till 2002. Between May 2003 and January 2007, she flew for the United Nations World Food and The Red Cross, mainly operating in Central and West Africa countries. She started flying for South Africa Airways in February 2019 and is now flying internationally as a senior first officer on the Airbus 340. Before that, she also flew for DHL in the Southern African Region.

== Awards and Recognitions ==
She has been recognised and honoured with several awards including:

- She was recognised as one of the 100 Greatest Women in Aviation World-wide in a book authored by Liz Moscrop and Sanjay Rampal, published in 2016.
- 2003 – She received the First African Female Pilot Award by Black Management Forum
- She received Limpopo Women in Excellence Awards – Black Management Forum.
- 2003 - She was nominated for the Woman of the Year Award (Science and Technology)

== Works ==
In 2012, she established the African College of Aviation in Johannesburg, through which she trains and inspires a new generation of Pilots.
