= Aluel James Bol =

South Sudanese pilot (born 1983)

- Born: 1983 (age 42–43); Lakes State, South Sudan
- Citizenship: South Sudan
- Occupation: Commercial pilot
- Years active: 2011–present
- Known for: Aviation
- Title: Airline captain with Delta Air Lines

Aluel James Bol is a professional pilot in the United States, who flies for Delta Air Lines. She is the first woman from South Sudan to qualify as an airline pilot.

== Early life and education ==
Bol was born circa 1983 to South Sudanese parents. Her father was the late Justice James Bol. She grew up in Kenya, as a refugee, during South Sudan's political and ethnic conflict. Following the death of her father, she was sponsored by the new South Sudanese government to complete training as an airline pilot in aviation schools in the United States, graduating in 2011.

== Career ==
Following her graduation in 2011, Bol worked for Ethiopian Airlines. She then took up a consulting role with the South Sudanese Ministry of Transport and Roads. Later, she flew for the low-cost carrier flydubai, a subsidiary of Emirates. In 2018, she was made a captain with Delta Air Lines, a major American airline company, headquartered in Atlanta, Georgia.
