= Fadiko Gogitidze =

First Adjarian woman pilot

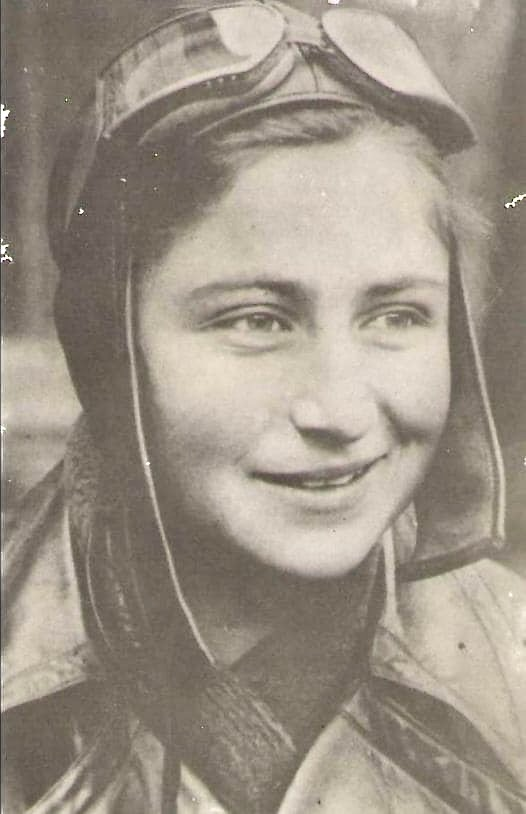
Fadiko Gogitidze

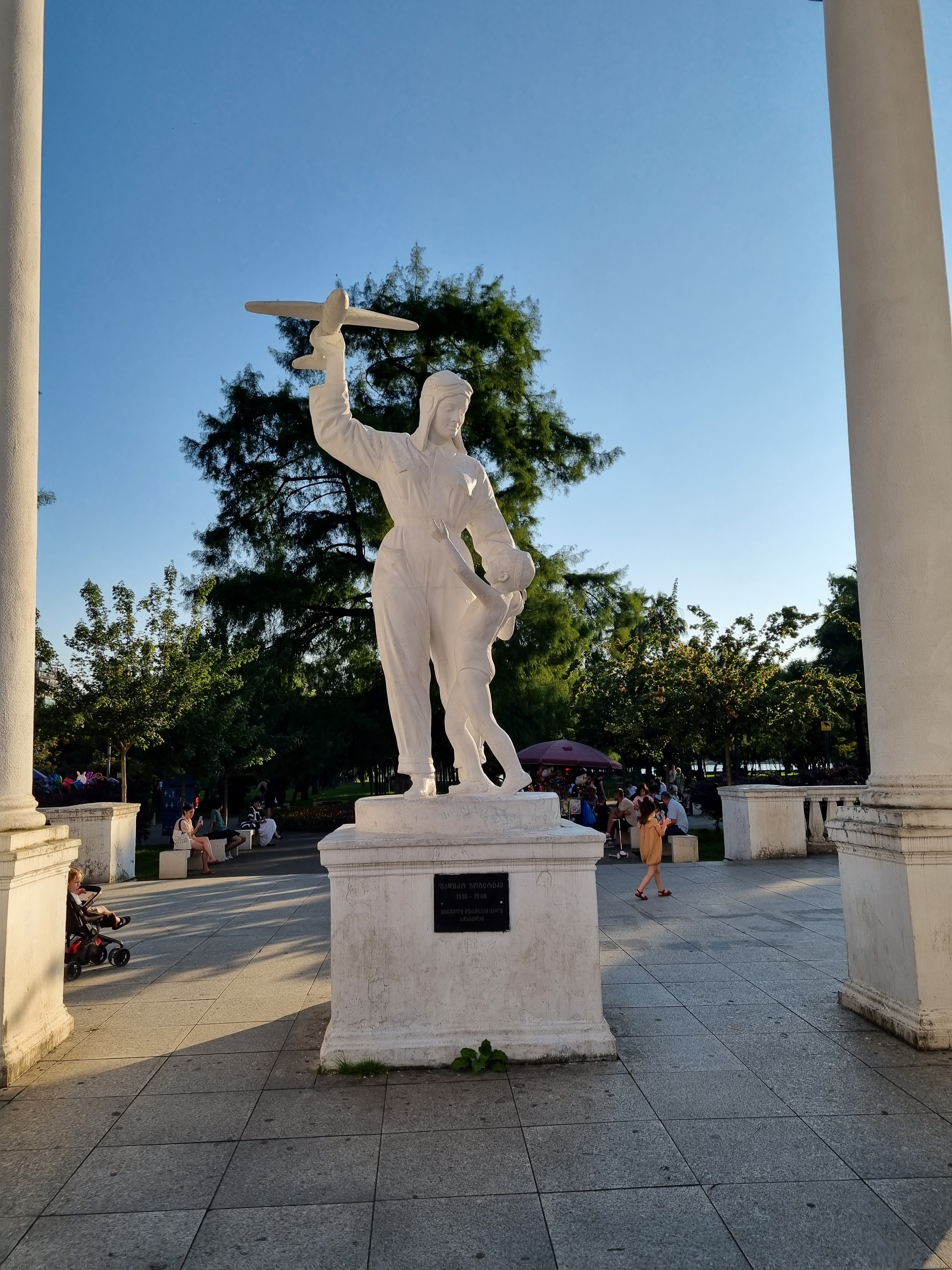
Sculpture dedicated to Gogitidze in Batumi

Fadiko Gogitidze (Georgian: ფადიკო გოგიტიძე; 1916 – 20 October 1940) was a Georgian pilot. She is recognized as the country's first female aviator.

== Biography ==
Fadiko Gogitidze was born in Kobuleti Municipality in 1916. The Tbilisi Flight School opened in 1934 and Gogitidze graduated from there in 1936, and began working as an instructor at the Batumi Aeroclub. She was the first woman in the country to become a pilot, overcoming sexism to enroll for training and to graduate. Her first flight was on 18 August 1936.

Fadiko Gogitidze died while on undertaking a test flight in Batumi on 20 October 1940. She had a three month old daughter named Julieta.

== Legacy ==
There is a sculpture dedicated to her in a park in Batumi. It is an example of Soviet art, depicting a female pilot, with a small child at her feet admiring the airplane. Popov Street in Kobuleti was renamed after her in 2014. A sculpture dedicated to Gogitidze was unveiled at the entrance to Batumi International Airport.
