= Durba Banerjee =

First Indian woman commercial pilot

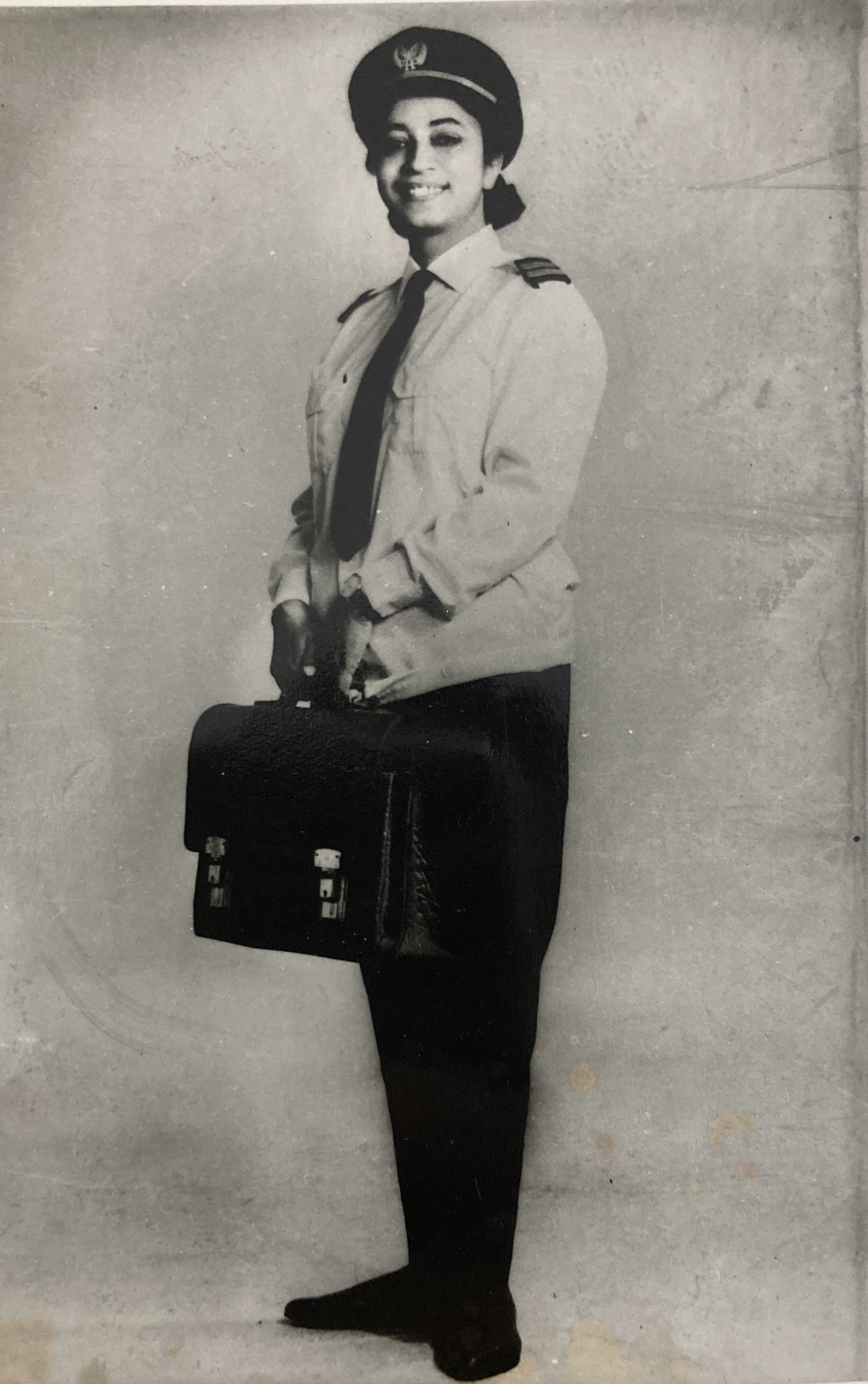
- Born: India

Durba Banerjee was the first Indian woman commercial pilot.

== Early life ==
As a child while growing up Banerjee liked planes and flying, becoming a pilot was her passion. She was the first woman of her times to break stereotypes and venture into this field.

== Career ==
Banerjee started her aviation career flying an aircraft with Air Survey India as a DC3 pilot in 1959.

She has to her credit the most flying hours with 9000 hrs.

- She became a Commander in the F27 turboprop aircraft
- With the arrival of the B737 200 series she got herself type rated as a Jet Pilot
