= Phetogo Molawa =

South African Air Force officer and pilot

- Born: 1986 (age 39–40); Thaba Nchu, Free State, South Africa
- Occupations: Military officer, Helicopter pilot
- Known for: First Black female helicopter pilot in South Africa; First female SAAF station commander
- Title: Lieutenant Colonel, South African Air Force

Phetogo Molawa is South Africa's first black female helicopter pilot in the South African Air Force and the South African National Defence Force. She is currently a captain in the South African Air Force. In 2018 she became the first woman and the first black person to take command of a South African Air Force installation; specifically, she became the new commanding officer of the South African Air Force base in Port Elizabeth.

She was born at Thaba Nchu near Bloemfontein in 1986 and joined the South African Air Force after leaving school.
