= Nicole Chang-Leng =

Seychellois pilot (1977–2022)

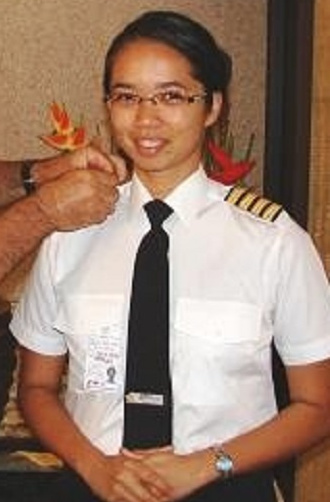
- Chang-Leng in 2007 receiving her captain's epaulettes
- Born: 28 September 1977
- Died: 3 November 2022 (aged 45)
- Resting place: Good Shepherd Cemetery, Mont Fleuri
- Known for: Seychelles' first female pilot and captain

Nicole Anna Michelle Chang-Leng (28 September 1977 – 3 November 2022) was a Seychellois pilot. She began her career in 1997, becoming the Seychelles' first female pilot by flying for Air Seychelles on their domestic flights. In 2001, she was promoted to first officer on their international routes. In 2007 she was promoted to captain, becoming the first female Seychellois captain in her country and the airline. On two occasions, she commanded all-women flight crews; one such occasion was in honour of International Women's Day.

== Career ==
According to Chang-Leng, her parents and teachers originally wished for her to study medicine at University College London, but she decided that she would rather be a pilot. She trained in South Africa and started to work for Air Seychelles in 1997 as the co-pilot of a De Havilland Canada DHC-6 Twin Otter. She flew the Twin Otter and the Britten-Norman BN-2 Islander on domestic flights for the first four years of her career. She was the first female pilot in the Seychelles.

In 2001, she became a first officer for international flights on a Boeing 767. Chang-Leng earned her airline transport pilot licence in 2006 and was promoted to captain in 2007. Upon assuming the role, she became the first female captain from the Seychelles, and the first Seychellois woman to captain Air Seychelles' international flights. Seychellois president James Michel called her appointment "a milestone for our country". Her first flight as captain took place two days later, on 23 August 2019, when she captained an all-woman flight crew on a flight from the Seychelles to Mauritius. She captained another all-woman crew for International Women's Day in 2011, flying from Charles de Gaulle Airport to Seychelles International Airport.

In August 2019, Chang-Leng delivered the first A320neo operated out of Africa or the Indian Ocean to the Seychelles; the flight had to perform an emergency stop in Abu Dhabi after smoke was detected in the plane.

== Personal life ==
Nicole Chang-Leng was born to Marie-Claire and Lewis Chang-Leng. As a child, Chang-Leng attended primary school in the Seychelles before attending boarding school in the United Kingdom as a teenager. She had two sisters. She had one child, a son she gave birth to in 2002. According to Chang-Leng, when she first returned to work after having her son, she had to explain to her male colleagues what the breast pump she carried with her was for.

According to Chang-Leng, although people sometimes would view her as Asian, she considered herself Seychellois.

== Death and legacy ==
Chang-Leng died on 3 November 2022, at the age of 45. The day following her death, Seychellois president Wavel Ramkalawan publicly posted his condolences to her family, calling Chang-Leng "a true daughter of our soil" and "beacon of hope for all who aspire to live out their dream".

Chang-Leng was buried on 10 November 2022. Pilots from Air Seychelles attended her funeral and performed a flyover in her honour, using the A320neo she had delivered in 2019.
