= Matice Wright =

Matice Wright-Springer
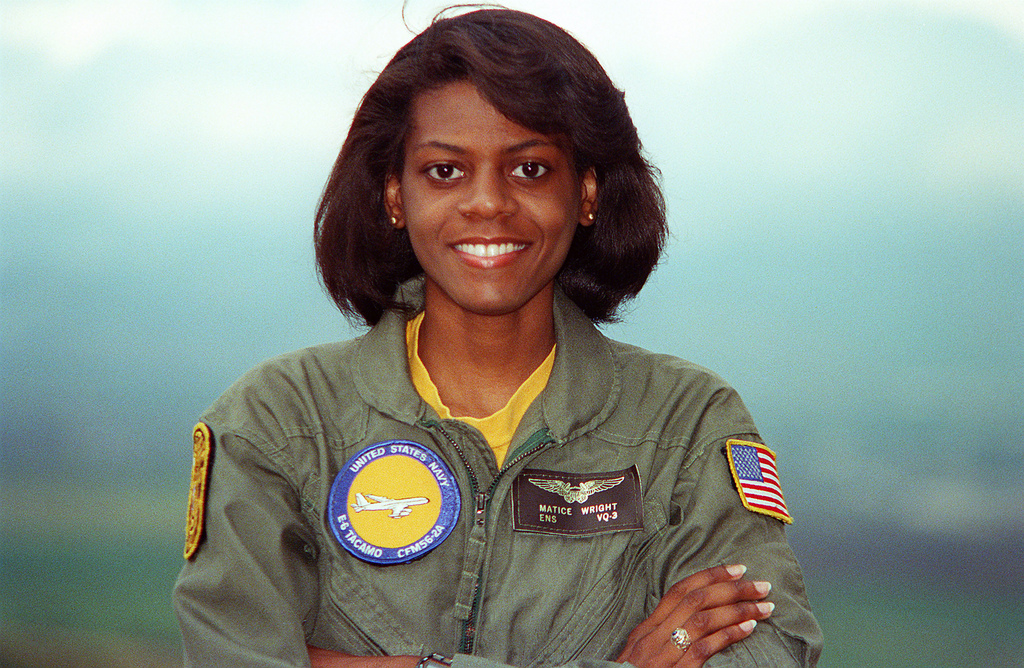
- Ensign Wright in 1993
- Born: 1965; Annapolis, Maryland, USA
- Military career
- Allegiance: United States
- Branch: United States Navy
- Service years: 1988–1996
- Rank: Lieutenant
- Other work: White House fellow (1997-98)

Matice Wright-Springer (born 1965) is the first African-American female naval flight officer.

== Life ==
Matice Wright-Springer was born and grew up in Annapolis, Maryland. She attended Annapolis High School in her hometown. She received a bachelor's degree in the physical sciences from the United States Naval Academy. After leaving active duty, Wright obtained a master's degree in business administration from Johns Hopkins University. She went on to obtain a master's degree in public administration from Harvard University's Kennedy School of Government.

== Career ==
Matice graduated from the United States Naval Academy in 1988. In 1989, she became the United States Navy's first African-American female flight officer. She went on to serve on active duty for eight years. After leaving active duty, she worked in the private sector. In 1997, she was appointed a White House Fellow in the United States Treasury Department. She also worked to manage Sikorsky Aircraft international military helicopter programs. She went on to become the principal director for industrial policy at the United States Department of Defense. In fall 2016, former president Barack Obama appointed her to the United States Naval Academy Board of Visitors where she currently serves. She also served as a vice president at ManTech International, supporting federal customers. In March 2021, Matice became a senior vice president at Booz Allen Hamilton and served there until retirement in 2025. Matice continues to serve as an Advisor for the National Medal of Honor Center for Leadership and as a member of the Naval Academy Board of Trustees.
