= Susan Mashibe =

Tanzanian businesswoman (born 1973)

- Born: 1973 (age 52–53)
- Citizenship: Tanzanian
- Education: Western Michigan University, Southwest Michigan College
- Occupations: Pilot, Maintenance engineer, Business woman
- Known for: Founder of VIA Aviation
- Notable work: Providing support services for Private jets
- Awards: Young Global Leader (2011), Archbishop Tutu Fellow (2009)

Susan Mashibe (born 1973) is a pioneering Tanzanian certified pilot, maintenance engineer and businesswoman who founded her own company, VIA Aviation, in 2003. It supports private jet aircraft with services such as refuelling, catering, cleaning and logistics. In 2011, she was recognized as a Young Global Leader by the World Economic Forum, and in 2013 was a speaker at the Bush Institute's African First Ladies Summit in Dar es Salaam.

== Early life ==
Born in 1973 in Kigoma, a small town in western Tanzania, Susan Mashibe was the daughter of a civil servant. She was left with her grandmother after her parents flew to Dar es Salaam when she was four years old. Realizing that she would not be left behind if she could fly a plane herself, from that day on she dreamt of becoming a pilot. She spent her childhood in Mwanza on Lake Victoria.

After completing her school education in Tanzania, she went to Western Michigan University where she began training as a pilot when she was 19. While studying to improve her English, she entered a course on aircraft maintenance at Southwestern Michigan College qualifying as an FAA-certified airframe and power plant technician in 1996. She completed commercial pilot training in 2001.

== Career ==
In conjunction with her studies in the United States, she worked for Duncan Aviation in Kalamazoo repairing turboprop engines.

After earning her commercial license, as a result of the September 11 attacks Mashibe had difficulty in finding work as a pilot. On the advice of a South African, she decided to open her own company providing ground services for private jets in Tanzania. In 2003, she launched Tanzanite Jet Center or TanJet with a small office at Dar es Salaam Airport. Her first client, Jacob Zuma who would later become president of South Africa, was so pleased with the quality of her services that she was soon handling all the private planes connected with the South African embassy.

Today Mashibe's company, now called VIA Aviation, provides support services for planes operated by company executives, the military and heads of state. Equipped with 80,000 square feet (7,400 m^{2}) of hangar space, it was the first company in Tanzania and East Africa to offer logistical support services, including aircraft handling, clearances, security and fuel.

Mashibe also heads Universal Africa Logistic Ltd. and Kilimanjaro Aviation Logistics Centre, handling authorizations for private jets throughout Africa. In addition to her professional duties, she strives to promote the inclusion of mathematics and science subjects in education programmes giving particular attention to girls in Tanzania's primary and secondary schools.

== Awards and distinctions ==
Susan Mashibe has received many awards, including:

- 2009: Selected as an Archbishop Tutu Fellow
- 2009: Tanzania Women of Achievement Award
- 2011: Fortune Most Powerful Women Mentee
- 2011: Young Global Leader of the World Economic Forum
- 2012: Women4Aprica Recognition Award
- 2013: Global Development (IGD) Jennifer Potter Emerging Leaders Fellowship Programme
- 2017: African Female Leader of the Year (co-winner) from African Leadership Magazine
