= Lynn Rippelmeyer =

American pilot

Lynn Rippelmeyer is the first woman to fly the Boeing 747, the first woman to captain a 747 trans-oceanic, part of the first all-female crew, and first flight attendant to become an airline pilot. In retirement, she authored two books to chronicle her aviation journey - Life Takes Wings and Life Takes Flight and founded the nonprofit, ROSE - Roatan Support Effort.

Rippelmeyer became the first woman to fly the 747 as a first officer for Seaboard World Airlines in 1980–1981. Seaboard World merged with Flying Tiger Line in 1980. Rippelmeyer became the first woman to captain the "jumbo jet" on a transoceanic flight while at People Express Airlines in 1984. She started her aviation career as a TWA flight attendant in 1972 before obtaining a departmental transfer as a TWA B-727 flight engineer in 1978.

She was first officer on the first all-female crew for a scheduled commercial US carrier with Captain Emilie Jones, flying an Air Illinois, DHC-6 Twin Otter, 30 December 1977. This event was featured in the PBS documentary series We'll Meet Again with Ann Curry on Jan 8, 2019. In 1983 at People Express, Rippelmeyer was a co-captain on the first all female Boeing 737 crew. People Express merged with Continental which later merged with United Airlines. At United, she trained on the B-787 Dreamliner before retiring in 2013.

Captain Rippelmeyer's uniforms were placed in the Smithsonian Institution, the San Diego Air and Space Museum, TWA's historical uniform display at the JFK airport's TWA Flight Center, and also in the Monroe County Historical Museum. She was named a Woman of the Year in England (1984), inducted into the International Forest of Friendship by Betty Gillies, a WWII WASP and original 99; mentioned in Who's Who of American Women 1983–1984, and was featured in a BBC documentary, Reaching for the Skies Episode: 2 "The Adventure of Flight", now available on YouTube.Captain Rippelmeyer was featured in National Geographic's special Airplanes edition in April-May 2026 in an article titled Queen of the Skies.

== Early life ==
Rippelmeyer was born and raised on a farm in Valmeyer, Illinois. She attended University of Illinois to earn a teaching degree in English worked as a student teacher in a Chicago inner-city school. Rippelmeyer began her career in aviation as a TWA flight attendant in 1972. Her interest in flying took hold when friends who were flight instructors offered lessons in a Piper J-3 Cub seaplane in Vermont. She obtained her required certificates and training at Tamiami Airport in Miami where she worked as a flight instructor and charter pilot.

== Career ==
While working for TWA as a flight attendant part time and as a flight instructor/charter pilot, she was hired by Air Illinois in 1977 as a Twin Otter DHC-6 First Officer. She was initially told she would not be allowed to fly with Capt. Emilie Jones. However, due to inclement weather and the inability of the designated flight crew to make it to the airport on December 30, 1977, Rippelmeyer and Captain Jones were permitted to fly the scheduled turboprop commuter plane under the condition that the passengers were not made aware the pilots were both women. This was the first all-female crew of a scheduled flight in the United States.

In 1984, Rippelmeyer became the first woman to captain a Boeing 747 across an ocean. Prior to this milestone, Rippelmeyer had been involved with transatlantic flights as a flight attendant and as a B-747 pilot for the cargo airline, Seaboard World Airlines in 1980–1981. The 1984 People Express flight was the first time a woman held the reins as Captain of this flight. Rippelmeyer acknowledged that the departure from Newark, New Jersey was uneventful. However, upon arrival in England, she was welcomed by reporters, magazine writers, and photographers due to the rarity of female pilots. Photos from this event were shared among newspapers across the world. Captain Rippelmeyer is the first American to have received this honor.

== Retirement ==
In retirement, Rippelmeyer authored two books about her career in aviation. Life Takes Wings: Lessons Learned from the World's First Female 747 Pilot (2022) and Life Takes Flight: Inspiration from the World's First Female 747 Pilot (2023). She is a public speaker, giving keynote addresses and presentations.

Rippelmeyer founded the non-profit organization ROSE (ROatan Support Effort) in September 2017. She sought to bring hope of a better life to the people of Roatan, Honduras. Earlier, Rippelmeyer flew daily commercial flights into Tegucigalpa, Honduras. Passengers often included missionaries and medical teams. She became friends with some people in Roatan, who were creating and supporting health care clinics, schools, sports programs and an animal shelter. After witnessing the island's needs, she began bringing supplies in on her flights, during her days off and while on vacation. ROSE helps to collect, transport and deliver donated supplies to qualifying local non-governmental organizations, groups and programs which provide medical, dental & vision health care, education and meals.

As of 2023, Rippelmeyer lives near Houston, Texas.
