= Beverley Drake =

Aviator

- Born: Beverley Christiani Drake; 20 June 1956; Georgetown, Guyana
- Other name: Beverly Johnson
- Occupations: pilot, NTSB accident investigator
- Years active: 1977–present
- Known for: first woman pilot for the Guyana Defence Force

Beverley Drake (born 20 June 1956) is a Guyanese pilot and aviation expert who is an administrator and accident investigation analyst with the United States National Transportation Safety Board (NTSB). She was one of the first two woman pilots to work in the Guyana Defence Force, first woman commercial pilot of Guyana Airways, and was the first and only black woman to serve as a senior aviation accident investigator for the NTSB. She serves as the manager of the Federal Women's Program of the NTSB and program director of the Industry and Government Affairs division of the NTSB.

== Early life ==
Beverley Drake was born on 20 June 1956 in Georgetown, Guyana, to Elaine and Clive Drake. She grew up, youngest of two daughters of the family in the Costello Housing Scheme in the neighbourhood known as "La Penitence". She was a tomboy and enjoyed playing cricket with the neighbourhood boys and building model aircraft. She also shared a love of flying with her father, who had wanted to be a pilot. Drake attended St. Pius Primary School before graduating from St. Rose's High School in 1974. She went on to further her education, enrolling in a course for a degree in chemistry and biology at the University of Guyana in 1975. For two years, she pursued her scientific studies before winning a scholarship to study aviation at Embry-Riddle Aeronautical University. Ten days after she began her schooling, Drake's mother died suddenly. Though a difficult time, she resolved to remain in school and returned to her studies after the funeral. After completion of the coursework for instrument and crew management, as well as pilot licensing, Drake completed her flight training at the airfield, in Wallerfield, Trinidad. She received her commercial pilot's licence from Guyana in 1977.

== Career ==
Upon completion of her training, Drake was hired as one of the first two-woman pilots of the Guyana Defence Force, flying Britten-Norman Islanders. Her duties involved flying over Guyana's jungles, without navigational aids, to monitor the bush areas. Within six months, she was transferred to Guyana Airways as their first woman pilot and began flying Hawker Siddeley 748s and de Havilland Canada Twin Otters. Her flight schedule involved both local flying and international flights to Barbados, Dominica and Trinidad. During this time, she married an army major, Randolph Johnson.

Drake's first son, Kevin was born in 1979 in Guyana and came with her and her husband when they moved to the United States the following year. Johnson wanted to pursue career options in New York, but Drake found it difficult to continue flying in Brooklyn. She tried to join the US Air Force and pursue other options, but was turned away because she either didn't have the qualifications or wasn't a citizen. Four years after Kevin's birth, Drake had her younger son, Kurt. Unable to work in aviation, she took a temporary job in 1984 working for Goldman Sachs and joined clubs like the Negro Airmen International, for which she became secretary, and the Black Pilots of New York to keep up with her flying skills.

The job with Goldman Sachs as an analyst turned into a permanent position, though Drake recognised after the 1987 financial melt-down that it was unstable. As a working mother, she had to rely on babysitters, neighbours and friends to help out with her children when she worked nights. She also continued her networking with the Black Pilots of New York and when another market crash occurred in 1989, Drake began thinking about returning to aviation. One of the fellow members of the pilots club encouraged her apply for a position as a junior investigator at the National Transportation Safety Board (NTSB).

In 1991, Drake was hired as an investigator and moved to Washington, D. C. When she joined the NTSB, Drake was surprised at the sexism she discovered and felt that she had to work "ten times better" than the others in the male-dominated field. She divorced in 1994 and returned to school, completing the program of the NTSB's Accident Investigation School and then a course on aircraft and helicopter accident investigation at the USC. Institute of Safety and Systems Management. Drake earned a bachelor's degree in aeronautics in 2002 and then in 2005 completed her master's degree in Aeronautical Science, both with Embry-Riddle Aeronautical University. She later became the first black woman senior accident investigator of the NTSB and as of 2013 was the only woman to have served in that capacity.

Drake serves as the manager of the NTSB's Federal Women's Program. As part of her duties in administration, Drake consults with aviation officials in various countries in an effort to improve their safety records. She has investigated over 300 crashes and shares her expertise as a means of helping reduce mechanical and environmental factors involved in aircraft accidents. In 2013, she was promoted to also serve as the Program Manager of the Office of the NTSB's Industry and Government Affairs division, which oversees forums and symposiums on air safety. She has presented safety seminars throughout the United States, including for such organisations as the Experimental Aircraft Association and The National Air and Space Museum.

== Legacy ==
In 2013, Drake's image was issued on a postage stamp in her native Guyana to honour her achievement as a pioneer pilot. She actively works to inspire and mentor young women to pursue careers in aviation and STEM fields.
