= Ann-Maria =

Ann Maria may refer to:

== Media ==
- "Ann-Maria" (song), a single by Dutch girl group Luv' in 1980
- Ann Maria Kalippilaanu (English: "Ann Maria is in Fury"), a 2016 Indian Malayalam children's film

== People ==
- AnnMaria De Mars (born 1958), an American technology executive, author and judoka
- Ann Maria Bocciarelli, South African aviator
- Ann Maria Bradshaw (1801–1862) English actress and vocalist
- Ann Maria Nankabirwa, Ugandan politician
- Ann Maria Thorne (1813–1881), American concert singer and actress
