= Elena Caragiani-Stoenescu =

Romanian aviator (1887–1929)

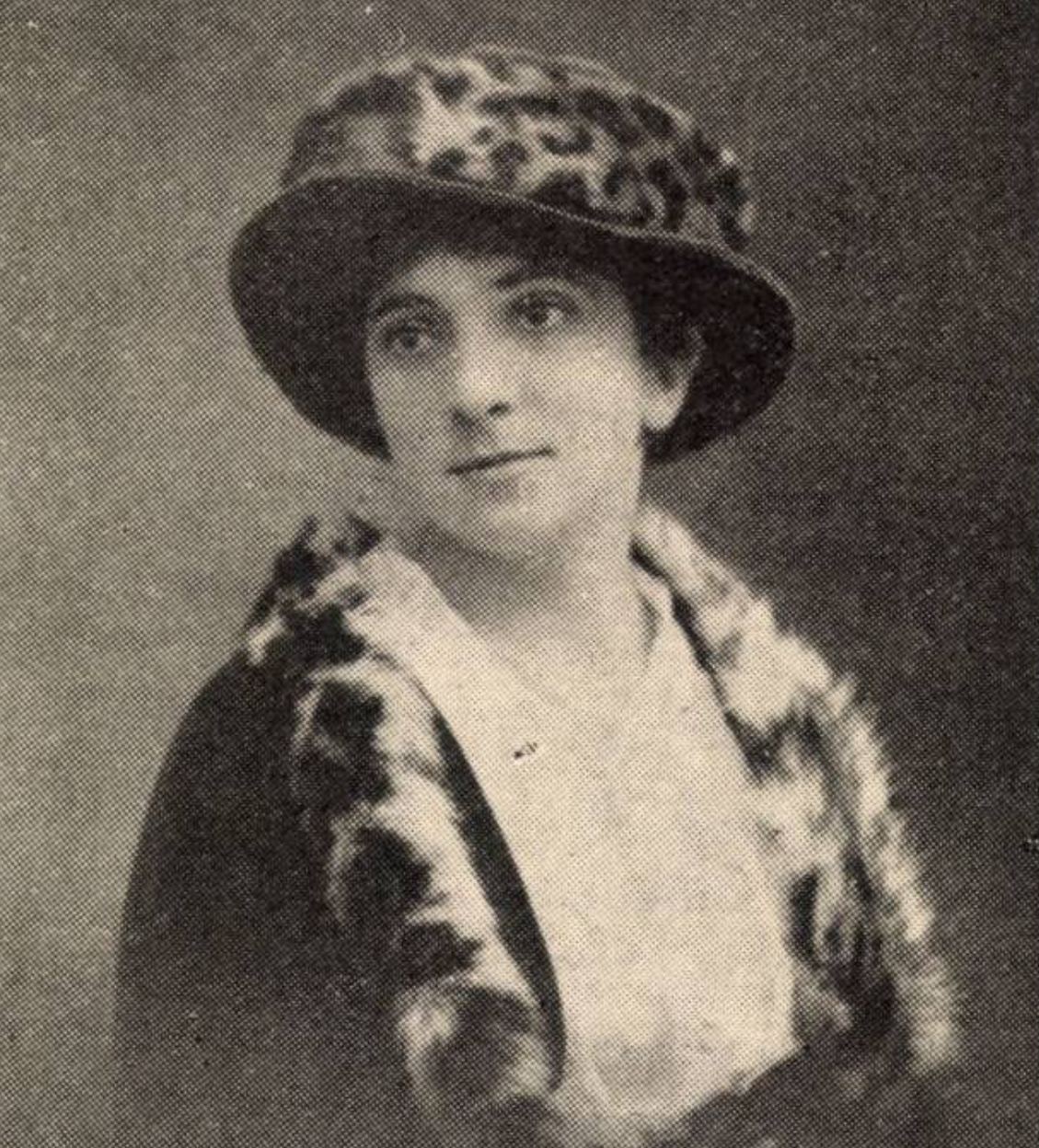
- Born: Elena Caragiani; 13 May 1887; Tecuci, Kingdom of Romania
- Died: 29 March 1929 (aged 41); Bucharest, Kingdom of Romania
- Occupation: Aviator
- Known for: First woman aviator in Romania

Elena Caragiani-Stoenescu (13 May 1887 in Tecuci – 29 March 1929 in Bucharest) was the first woman aviator in Romania.

She graduated from the pilot school in Bucharest, but her applications for a license were rejected by the Romanian authorities. For this reason, she left for France, and two years later, she received her license, issued by the International Aeronautical Federation, being one of the first 15 female pilots in the world.

== Biography ==
Born in 1887 in Tecuci, she was the daughter of Dr. Alexandru Caragiani, brother of Ioan D. Caragiani, and Zenia Radovici. Elena studied law in Iași and where she graduated in 1913.

Interested in aviation, she first flew in 1912, together with her horse riding instructor, Mircea Zorileanu. Soon she joined Bibescu's Liga Națională Aeriană (National Air League) where she trained with Andrei Popovici. After completing the flight courses, she applied for a pilot license but was denied by minister Spiru Haret and General Crăiniceanu.

She left for France where she attended the School of Civil Aviation of Mourmelon-le-Grand led by Roger Sommer, at Camp de Châlons. After passing all the exams, she received her International Aeronautical Federation pilot license, no. 1591, on 22 January 1914.

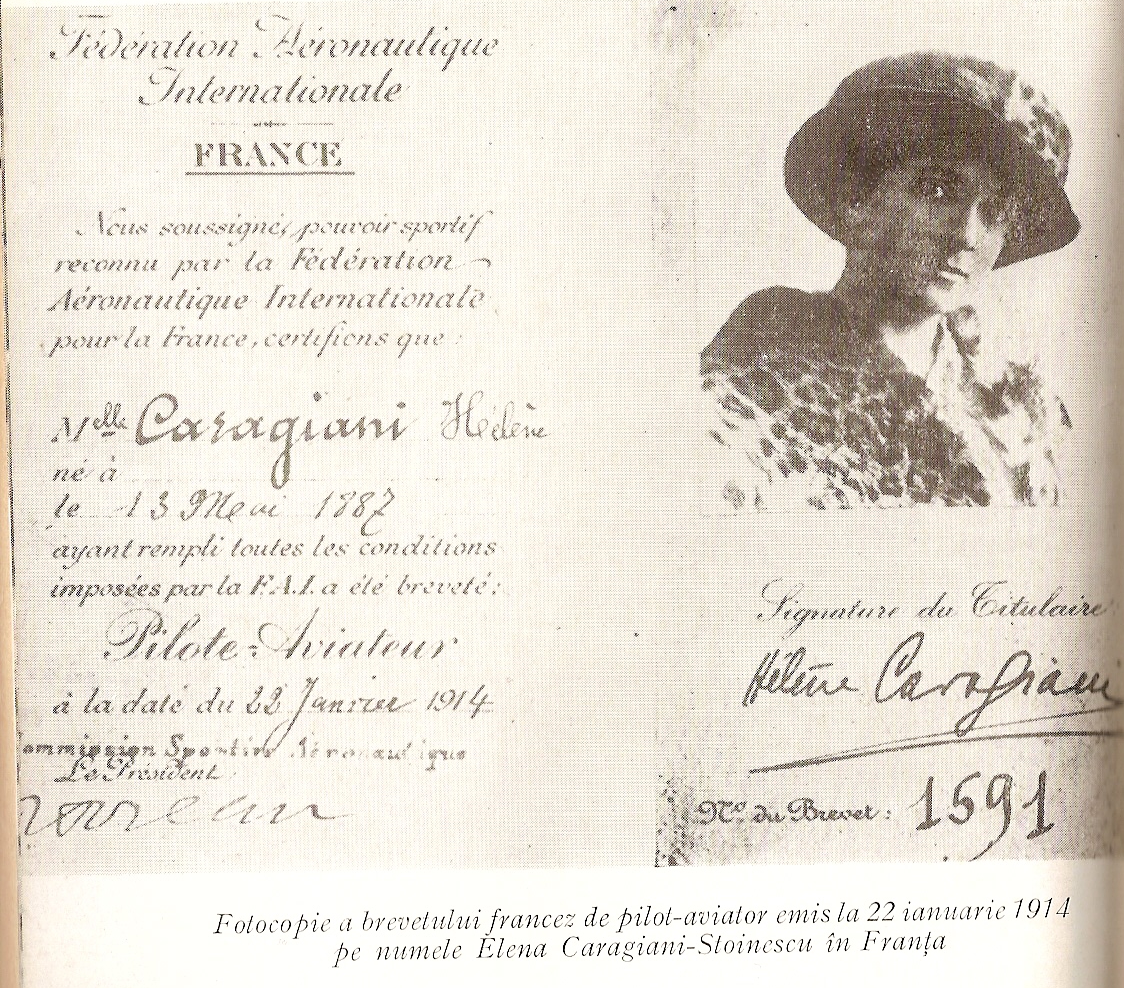
Photocopy of aviator license of Elena Caragiani-Stoenescu, 22 January 1914

Being refused again to fly in Romania, she returned to France where she became a reporter for a major French daily newspaper. She traveled to the Caribbean, Mexico and South America, then became a war correspondent for the Press Trust of Mexico.

In 1916, after Romania entered the war, she asked to participate as a pilot in the country's defense, but she was refused again. Enrolled in the Red Cross as a nurse, she participated in caring for the wounded Romanians in a camp hospital in Bucharest. After the withdrawal of the Romanian armed forces and institutions to Moldova, she organized a sanitary point at the parental home of Tecuci together with her sister.

After the end of the war, she married the lawyer Virgil Stoenescu and settled together in Paris. She continued to work as a journalist in France, Mexico, the US, and countries in Africa or Asia, and specialized in reporting on aviation events.

Severely ill with tuberculosis, she returned to Bucharest, where she died at the age of 41, on 29 March 1929, and was buried in Bellu Cemetery. To honor her memory, the Industrial School Group from Tecuci was renamed in the autumn of 2012 to the "Elena Caragiani" Technological High School.

== Gallery ==
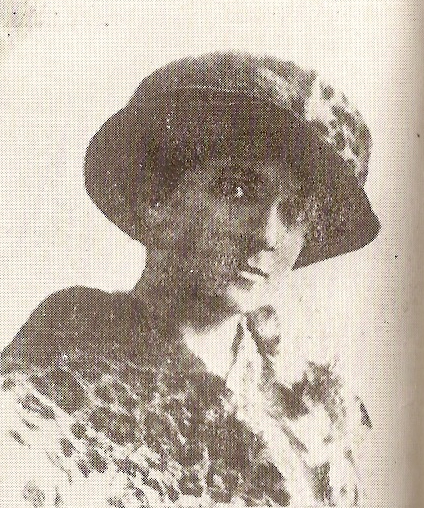
Portrait Elena Caragiani-Stoenescu

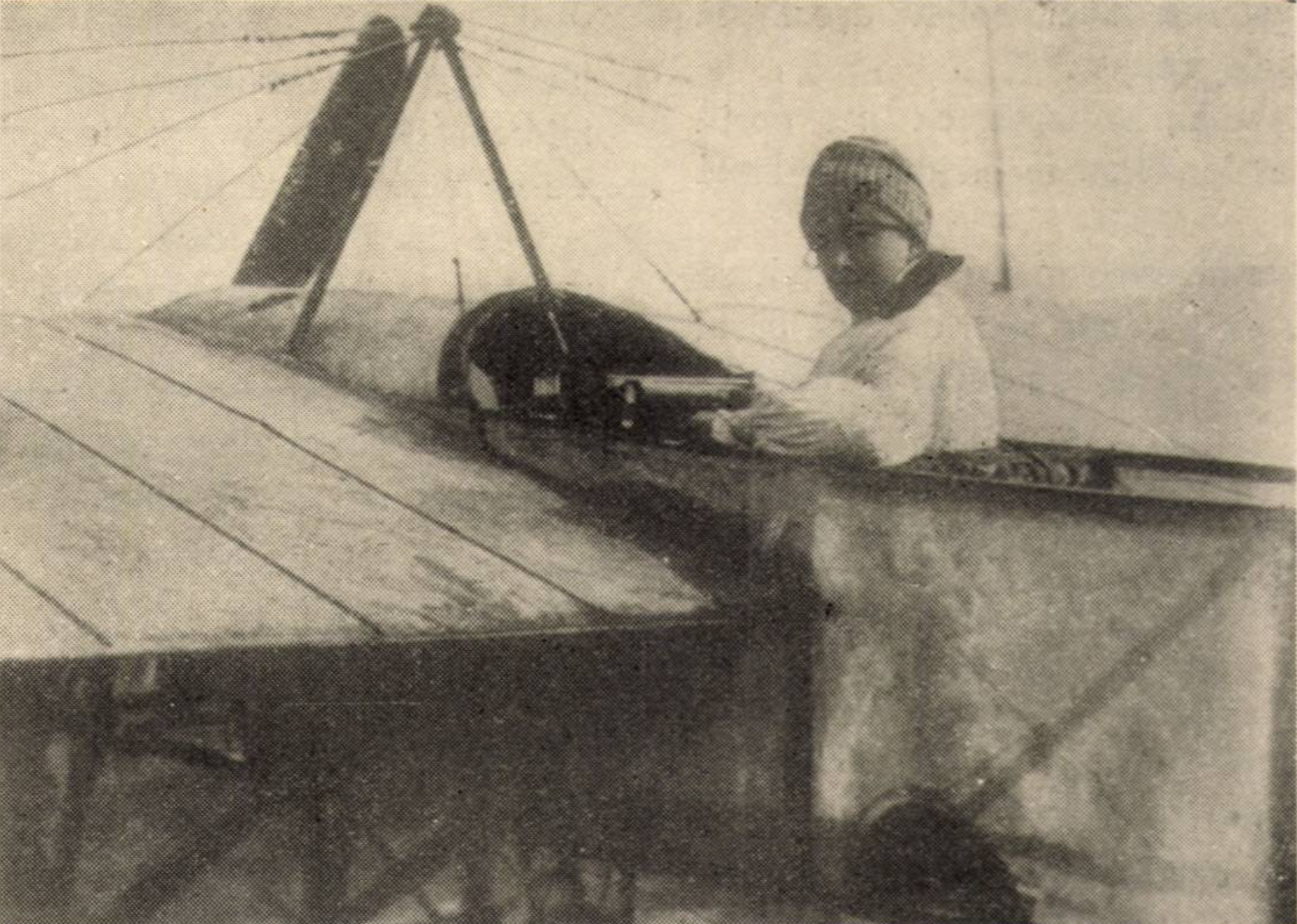
Elena Caragiani-Stoenescu at the controls of an aircraft
