= Isabella Ribeiro de Cabral =

Female pilot (1918–2005)

- Born: 11 March 1918; Port of Spain, Trinidad and Tobago
- Died: 6 November 2005 (aged 87)
- Other names: Isabella Ribeiro de Cabral de Freitas, Isabella Cabral, Isabella de Freitas
- Occupations: Insurance worker and event organizer
- Known for: First female pilot of Trinidad and Tobago
- Spouse(s): Frank de Freitas, m. 1948
- Children: 2

Isabella Ribeiro de Cabral (11 March 1918 – 6 November 2005) was the first female pilot from Trinidad and Tobago.

== Early life ==
Isabella Ribeiro de Cabral was born on 11 March 1918 in Trinidad to Isabella (née Ribeiro) and George Cabral, and was of Portuguese descent. Cabral's mother died in childbirth when her ninth child was born, and the eight remaining children were raised by her father, who was mayor of Port of Spain, Trinidad, in the late 1940s and early 1950s. The family travelled often by plane and Cabral became interested in flying. When in 1939 the Light Aeroplane Club was founded in Trinidad, she and her father joined as life members.

== Career ==
Cabral chose to work in the insurance business and became a career woman. When the war ended and the flying club resumed its training facilities, she immediately began to study for a pilot's license. Most of the trainers were veterans of the Royal Air Force and Cabral studied with former RAF pilot Neville Pereira. She passed her three hour solo flight on her first try. When she received her licence in 1948, she became the first woman pilot of Trinidad and Tobago. Soon after, on New Year's Day in 1949, she married Frank de Freitas, who subsequently became a pilot. The couple had two children, Francis and Isabella.

For a while, de Freitas did exhibition and competition shows in an Auster Aircraft, with which she had trained. Then she shifted her focus to production of cabarets, Carnival productions and band competitions often with her brother, George Jr. Her father composed two songs, The Story of Love and A Million Memories in honour of her mother.

== Death ==
De Freitas died on 6 November 2005. Her legacy was recalled in the book A biographical sketch of George Cabral, former Mayor of Port-of-Spain (1962), by author Aubrey E. James, who wrote the last chapter "A Woman in the News" as a biography of her.
