= Women of Aviation Worldwide Week =

Women Of Aviation Worldwide Week
- Women Of Aviation Worldwide Week logo
- Observed by: Men and women, worldwide
- Type: International civil awareness week
- Date: Week of March 8
- 2025 date: March 3–9
- 2026 date: March 2–8
- 2027 date: March 8–14
- 2028 date: March 6–12
- Frequency: Annual
- Related to: First female pilot licence worldwide anniversary | Raymonde de Laroche

Women Of Aviation Worldwide Week {WOAW} is a global aviation awareness week for girls of all ages observed to mark the anniversary of the world's first female pilot licence (March 8, 1910). The week is a call to address gender imbalance in the air and space industry. It is not country or group specific

Since March 2010, Women Of Aviation Worldwide Week's activities have been organized in 52 countries on 5 continents. 420,000 women and girls attended the Week's local hands-on activities. 69,768 women and girls experienced their first flight in a small aircraft in response to the Week's Fly It Forward® call to action.

== History ==
In January 2010, Mireille Goyer, an airline-rated pilot and aviation educator, launched an international grassroots initiative to celebrate the centennial of the first female pilot license worldwide earned by Raymonde de Laroche on March 8, 1910.

Her Fly It Forward® call to action encouraged pilots from around the world to introduce record numbers of girls of any age to aviation during, what was then dubbed, "Women Pilots' Week". In 2011, the one-time celebration evolved into the annual "Women Of Aviation Worldwide Week".

By addressing the female population's lack of exposure to aviation activities, Goyer's Fly It Forward® initiative aims to fulfill the dream of the pioneering women pilots of 1910, namely to see women participate in all aspects of aviation.

On September 10, 2012, Mireille Goyer founded the Institute for Women Of Aviation Worldwide (iWOAW), a not-for-profit global industry alliance. It organizes The Week's various contests and tracks The Week's activities in addition to managing other initiatives that facilitate women's integration in the industry around the year. Led by a gender-balanced, all-volunteer, Board of Directors, iWOAW's mission is to foster gender balance in the air and space industry through outreach, education, and advocacy.

== Activities and observances ==
Female-centric activities take place at airports and aerodromes around the world as well as in museums and aerospace businesses. Special commemoration flights are often conducted.

iWOAW organizes multiple challenges and contests during the week. The best known challenge, Fly It Forward®, rewards top performers with awards including "Most Female Friendly Airport Worldwide", "Most Female Friendly Community Worldwide", "Most Female Friendly Corporation Worldwide", "Most Dedicated Female Pilot Worldwide", and "Most Supportive Male Pilot Worldwide".

== Theme ==
Each year, a theme based on a global historical female breakthrough in the air and space industry highlights a specific sector of the industry.

List of themes (2010–2018)

- 2010 – 100 years of licensed female pilots (world's first female pilot license – Raymonde de Laroche, France)
- 2011 – 100 years of female air racers (world first women to enter an air race – Hélène Dutrieu, Belgium
- 2012 – 100 years of female seaplane pilots (world's first seaplane pilot – Hélène Dutrieu, Belgium)
- 2013 – 50 years of women in space (world's first female astronaut – Valentina Tereshkova, Russia)
- 2014 – 100 years of female aerobatic pilots (world's first female aerobatic pilot – Lydia Zvereva, Russia)
- 2015 – 100 years of female pilots in combat (world's first woman to fly in combat – Marie Marvingt, France)
- 2016 – 60 years of female bush pilots (world's first female bush pilot – Ada Rogato, Brazil)
- 2017 – 80 years of female helicopter pilots (world's first female helicopter pilot – Hanna Reitsch, Germany)
- 2018 - 65 years of supersonic women (world's first woman to fly at the speed of sound - Jacqueline Cochran, USA)

== List of Fly It Forward® Award Winners ==
Year		Most Female Pilot Friendly Airport Worldwide	Most Dedicated Female Pilot Worldwide	Most Supportive Male Pilot Worldwide
2010
2010	Winner	Oshawa, ON Canada	Amanda Sargent, Renton, WA United States	Andrei Floroiu, New York, NY United States
2010	First Finalist	Renton, WA United States	Allie Dunnington, Bristol United Kingdom	Peter Morton, Renton, WA United States
2010	Second Finalist	Kpong Field Ghana	Lesley Page, Oshawa, ON Canada	Dick Smith, Renton, WA United States
2011
2011	Winner	Frederick, MD United States	Dianna Stanger, Port Lavaca, TX United States	Leith Barnhill, Arlington, WA United States
2011	First Finalist	Arlington, WA United States	Lin Caywood, Frederick, MD United States	Doug Raine, Oshawa, ON Canada
2011	Second Finalist	Port Lavaca, TX United States	Lesley Page, Oshawa, ON Canada	Hubert Wren, Peterborough, ON Canada
2012
2012	Winner	Yellowknife, NT Canada	Kirsten Brazier, Yellowknife, NT Canada	Derrick Robinson, Yellowknife, NT Canada
2012	First Finalist	Frederick, MD United States	Megan Tyler, Yellowknife, NT Canada	Robert Ferlisi, Yellowknife, NT Canada
2012	Second Finalist	Peterborough, ON Canada	Lesley Page, Oshawa, ON Canada	Hubert Wren, Peterborough, ON Canada; Ron Haslam Peterborough, ON Canada
2013
2013	Winner	St Andrews, Winnipeg, MB, Canada	Kirsten Brazier, Yellowknife, NT Canada	Frank Roberts, St Andrews, Winnipeg, MB, Canada
2013	First Finalist	Yellowknife, NT, Canada	Megan Tyler, Yellowknife, NT Canada	Geoff Furniss, Yellowknife, NT Canada
2013	Second Finalist	Waterloo, ON, Canada	Dianna Stanger, Victoria, TX United States	Glen Sibbeston, Yellowknife, NT, Canada
2014
2014	Winner	Langley, BC, Canada	Dianna Stanger, Olivia, TX United States	Frank Walcher, Parksville, BC, Canada | Tom Keane, Victoria, TX, United States
2014	First Finalist	Victoria, TX, United States	Diana Jemson, Strathalbyn, SA Australia	George Tecklenborg, Abbotsford, BC Canada
2014	Second Finalist	Lachute, QC, Canada	Marguerite Varin, Lachute, QC Canada	Euan Harrison, Caloundra, QLD, Australia
2015
2015	Winner	Albuquerque, NM, United States	Dianna Stanger, Olivia, TX United States	Luc Bougie, Mascouche, QC, Canada | Matt Norgrove, Bathurst, NSW, Australia
2015	First Finalist	Lachute, QC, Canada	Ramona Cox, Torrance, CA United States	David Carroll | Gary Penglis Bathurst, NSW, Australia
2015	Second Finalist	Saint Andrews, MB, Canada	Diana Jemson, Strathalbyn, SA Australia	Bryan Clements | Chris Stott | Nick Wills Bathurst, NSW, Australia
2016
2016	Winner	Edinburg, TX, United States	Dianna Stanger, Olivia, TX United States	Yves Barbeau, Lachute, QC, Canada
2016	First Finalist	Lachute, QC, Canada	Yasmina Platt, Houston, TX United States	Hubert Wren, Peterborough, ON, Canada
2016	Second Finalist	Peterborough, ON, Canada	Ingrid Kutzner, Peterborough, ON Canada	Ron Haslam, Peterborough, ON, Canada
2017
2017	Winner	Albuquerque, NM, United States	Dianna Stanger, Olivia, TX United States	Sylvain Cantan, Bozas, Ardèche, France
2017	First Finalist	Lachute, QC, Canada	Bobbie Lind, Albuquerque, NM, United States	Yves Barbeau, Lachute, QC, Canada
2017	Second Finalist	Brampton, ON, Canada	Susan Larson, Albuquerque, NM, Canada	Bernard Chirol, Étables, Ardèche, France
