= Shirley Tyus =

African American pilot

- Born: June 28, 1950 (age 76); Spartanburg, South Carolina
- Occupation: Pilot
- Employer: United Airlines; Wheeler Airlines
- Known for: First African American female pilot for United Airlines

Shirley Tyus (born June 28, 1950) was the first African American female pilot to fly for United Airlines.

== Early life and family ==
Shirly Tyus was born in Spartanburg, South Carolina. She was raised by her parents, Martin Bullock and Marcelle Suber in Buffalo New York.

== Career ==
Before Tyus' aviation career began as a United Airlines flight attendant in 1972, she was a bookkeeper and model. While working as a flight attendant, she took a second job with a commuter airline out of North Carolina. After five years, Tyus began spending her breaks in the cockpit, talking shop with the pilot crew. In 1977, she enrolled in flight training at the Professional Flight School in Friendly, Maryland. She received her commercials pilot's license in 1979. Tyus balanced the demands of being a flight attendant by day with piloting cargo aircraft for the African-American-owned Wheeler Airlines, based in Raleigh, North Carolina, by night. In 1987, United Airlines hired her as a pilot and she continued training at United Airlines' Flight Training Center. After completing this advanced training, Tyus began flying for United Airlines. Tyus is the vice president of the Bessie Coleman Foundation, Inc. The BCF was founded in 1995 by a group of African American women involved in the aviation industry.

Tyus has appeared on several television programs and has been featured in newspaper and magazine articles, including the Washington Post, Washington Times, Ebony, Jet, and West African publications. Tyus volunteers with the Ariolina Young Aviators in Durham, North Carolina.
