= Ann Maria Bocciarelli =

South African aviator

Ann Maria Bocciarelli (also Anna; born 1897; date of death unknown) was a South African aviator. In 1913, she was the first woman to earn a pilot's license in Africa.

== Biography ==
Bocciarelli was of Italian descent and was born in Kimberley in 1897. She was the daughter of the sculptor, Achille Bocciarelli.

In 1913, Bocciarelli was one of 10 citizen flight trainees sponsored by the Union of South Africa to train with the Paterson Aviation Syndicate. Like other pilots in the school, she trained on Compton-Paterson biplane. She earned her pilot's license in 1913, making her the first woman on the African continent to become a licensed aviator.

Eventually, she and her family returned to Italy.
