= Early Australian female aviators =

List of women pilots active early 20th century Australia

Early Australian female aviators were generally active since 1927 when it became possible for an Australian woman to hold a pilot's licence and fly within Australia. Women had participated in gliding, or taken a licence overseas, but they had not been permitted to fly a plane under licence within Australia. The first Aero Club in Australia was established in 1915.

Florence Taylor was the first Australian woman to fly a plane, a glider built by her husband, George Augustine Taylor, in 1909. Emma Schultz also went up in Florence Taylor's glider.

Hilda Hope McMaugh, was a nurse who served with the Australian Army Nursing Service during World War I. She took a pilot's licence in England in 1919, and her achievement was recorded on film, but McMaugh was not allowed to use her licence within Australia.

Australian Women aviators with British aviator, Amy Johnson. Left to right: Evelyn Follett, Bobbie Terry, Margaret Skelton, Amy Johnson, Alice Upfold, Freda Deaton, Phyllis Arnott, Margaret Riordan. Taken at Queen of the Air pageant, Mascot 1930.

After World War I, and with the historic flights of Charles Kingsford Smith and Bert Hinkler, however, the Australian's public appetite for flying and air races was whetted. Pilots such as Amelia Earhart and Amy Johnson, inspired Australian women to want to take to the air.

== Millicent Bryant (1878–1927) ==
On 28 March 1927, widow Millicent Bryant from Vaucluse, Sydney became the first Australian woman to gain a pilot's 'A' or private licence. She died seven months later in a Sydney ferry accident. Her funeral, at Manly in Sydney, included a flypast by five aircraft.

== Jessie "Chubbie" Keith Miller (1902–1972) ==
Jessie was born in the remote mining town of Southern Cross Western Australia and went on to become a pilot of international standing. Her flying exploits places her amongst the greatest of the early pioneers of aviation. On 19 March 1928 she, together with Bill Lancaster, completed a flight from London to Darwin and with Jessie becoming the first woman to fly across the equator. She went on to participate in international air races and broke the speed record for crossing the US in both directions.

== Florence "Bobby" Mary Terry (1898–1976) ==
Bobby Terry as she was known, the wife of John Edgar Terry, grazier of Gunnedah, New South Wales, was the first Australian woman to own her own airplane in 1929. She was the second Australian woman to take a commercial pilot's licence after receiving training from the Aero Club of New South Wales, and qualified to fly seaplanes. She was a member of the group who flew with Amy Johnson into Sydney in 1930. She was a member of the Ninety-Nines. She later married Monte Fowler.

== Margaret "Meg" Skelton (1903–unknown) ==
Margaret Skelton, the daughter of a grazier of Inverell, New South Wales, was one of the six women pilots to escort Amy Johnson as she flew into Sydney, on her history making flight in 1930. After taking her licence in 1929, Skelton struggled to fulfil her ambition of flying to England during the years of the Great Depression, as she did not own a plane. She was no longer flying by 1953.

== Phyllis Arnott (1907–2002) ==
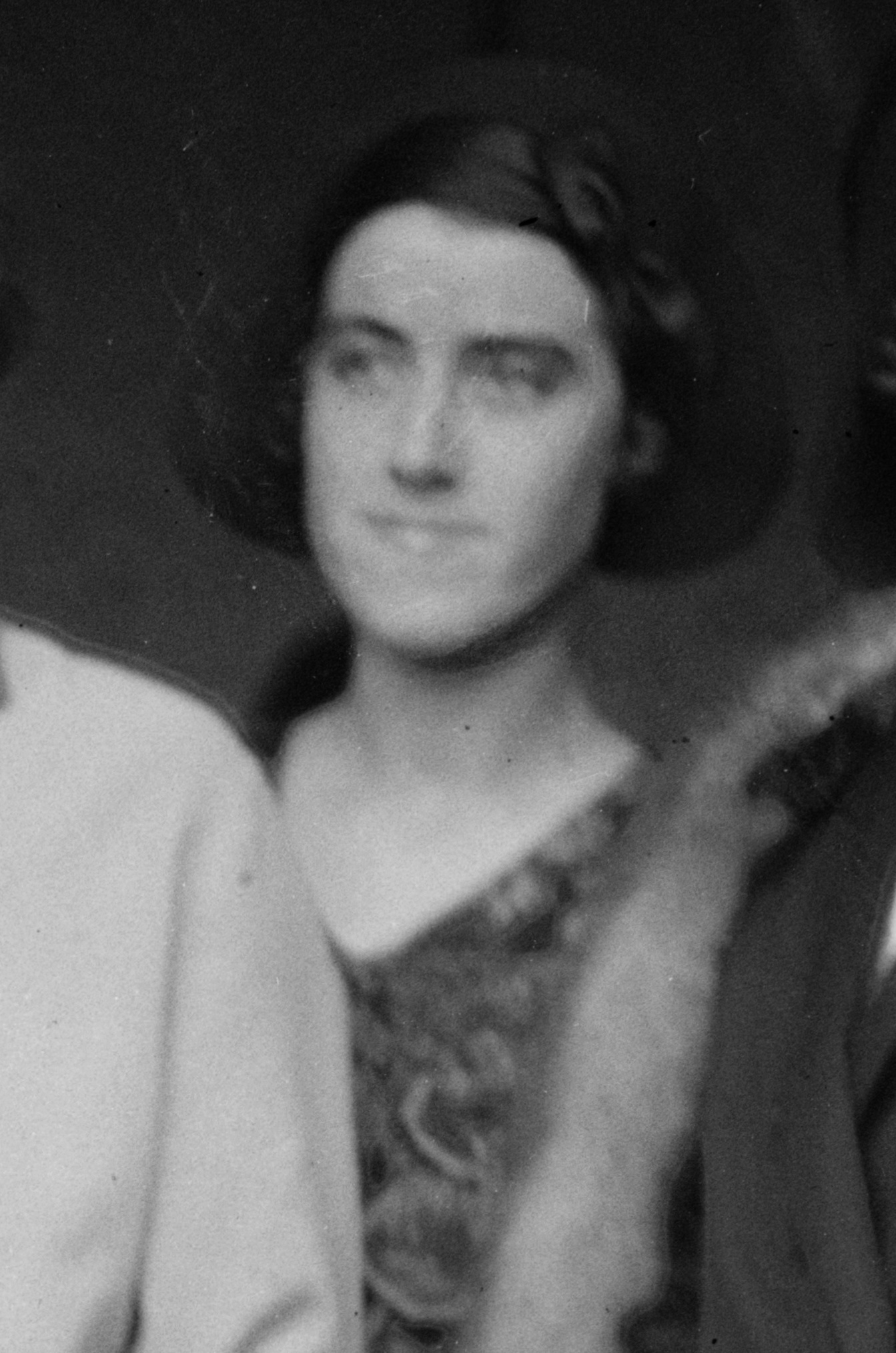
Phyllis Arnott 1930.

Phyllis Rogers Arnott from Sydney, Australia, a member of the Arnott's biscuit manufacturing family, was the first Australian woman to take a commercial pilot's licence 'B' in 1931 after receiving training from the Aero Club of New South Wales. Her two brothers had a plane, and she wanted to keep up with them. She continued to fly, but did not make a living from it. By 1940 she had moved on to studying engines and she eventually moved away from flying. QANTAS named an A380 aircraft after her.

== Freda Thompson OBE (1909–1980) ==
Freda Thompson born in Yarra, Victoria took her first flying lesson in 1930 at Essendon. From a wealthy family, Thompson would swap music lessons for flight lessons receiving a private 'A' pilot's licence in 1929. In 1932 she gained a commercial 'B' pilot's licence and became only the fifth woman in Australia to do so. She won the Adelaide Aerial Derby in 1932. In 1933 Thompson was the first woman in the British Empire to obtain an Instructors Licence, although she never worked as an instructor.

In 1934, Thompson sailed for England to pick up her new De Havilland Moth Major plane. She planned to participate in the England to Australia Air Race but was unable to complete the necessary preparations in time. Her new plane was specially fitted with long range fuel tanks for the journey to Australia. When she arrived in Australia, she was acclaimed as the first Australian woman to fly from England to Australia. Thompson's sister, Clare Embling would also learn to fly, taking her licence in 1936.

At the start of World War II, Thompson sold her plane, named Christopher Robin. She was commandant of the Woman's Air Training Corps in Victoria from 1940–1942. Despite applying to join the Women's Auxiliary Australian Air Force, their lack of interest prompted her to enlist in the Australian Women's Army Service in 1942. She instead served as an ambulance driver.

Following the war Thompson bought a de Havilland Hornet Moth, and named it Christopher Robin II. She flew extensively within Australia, and to Papua and New Guinea. She competed in air races and formation-flying events. She won forty-seven trophies. She was president in 1948 of the Royal Victorian Aero Club. She was still flying up until 1980. She was appointed an Officer of the Order of the British Empire (OBE) in 1972.

== Maude Lores Bonney OBE (1897–1994) ==
Lores Bonney as she was known, although born in South Africa, was the first Australian woman to fly solo in a DeHavilland-60G Moth from Australia to England in 1933. She had earlier circumnavigated Australia in 1932. She was also the first to fly from Australia to South Africa in 1937 in a Klemm L32. Bonney was the wife of wealthy Brisbane leather manufacturer, Harry Bonney. His cousin, Bert Hinkler had taken her for a flight in 1928, and inspired by his flying exploits, Bonney took flying lessons in secret. After Harry Bonney discovered Lores' intention to gain a licence, he bought her a plane in 1931, which she named "My Little Ship". Because of her husband's wealth and his ability to purchase a plane for her, the male oriented flying establishment who had had no wealthy patrons to assist them, were cynical about her achievements. Her solo flight from Australia to England was also overlooked due to the more public success of Amy Johnson. Her Klemm aircraft was destroyed in a fire in 1939. Her first aircraft, the De Havilland plane was requisitioned during World War II and later scrapped. Bonney's plans for an around the world flight did not materialise due to World War II. Despite offering her services as a pilot in World War II, these were declined. She stopped flying after 1945. She was awarded an OBE in 1934 for her Australia-England flight.

== Nancy-Bird Walton OBE (1915–2009) ==
Nancy Bird born in Kew, New South Wales, began taking flying lessons from the age of 18, in 1933, financing these by working in her father's shop. She trained at the newly formed air school set up by Charles Kingsford Smith in Sydney, and took her commercial pilot's 'B' licence in 1934, the youngest woman to do so. Bird was determined to make flying a career. She bought her first aircraft, a de Havilland Gipsy Moth with money borrowed from her father, and a legacy from a relative. In 1934, Bird and fellow flier Peggy McKillop embarked on their own tour – Australia's first 'Ladies Flying Tour' – offering joy-flights and dropping into local agricultural shows in an attempt to make a living from flying. She was also recruited to set up an air ambulance service in 1935 – the Royal Far West Children's Health Scheme, using her own plane, and later a much more spacious aircraft to transport patients.

Bird entered the Adelaide Centenary Air Race in 1936 along with fellow female pilots, Lores Bonney, May Bradford, Ivy Pearce and Freda Thompson and won the Ladies' Trophy. In 1938 she decided to take a break from flying and worked in Europe. She returned to Australia at the beginning of World War II and began training women in skills needed to assist servicemen flying in the Royal Australian Air Force. She married Englishman, Charles Walton, and they had two children. His pet name for her was "Nancy-Bird" and she became generally known as "Nancy-Bird Walton".

Walton founded the Australian Women Pilots' Association (AWPA) in 1953, and was president for five years. She returned to flying in 1958, after a twenty-year absence. She became the first non-American woman to win a trophy in the All Women's Transcontinental Air Race across America in 1958. This event is more commonly referred to as the 'Powder Puff Derby'.

When QANTAS launched its new Airbus A380 in 2008, the first one of the fleet was named "Nancy-Bird Walton" in her honour. She was recognised for her services to charities with an Officer of the Order of the British Empire (OBE) in 1966.

== Margaret "Peggy" McKillop Kelman OBE (1909–1998) ==
Peggy McKillop, born in Scotland to Irish and Australian parents, began flying training in 1931 at the Aero Club of New South Wales. She gained her pilot's 'A' licence in 1932, followed by a commercial pilot licence 'B' in 1935.

Her first and only paid job was flying for Nancy-Bird Walton, in 1935. During their 11-week tour of country New South Wales, Kelman met a young grazier with his own aeroplane near Moree. His name was Colin Kelman.

Colin followed Peggy to London in 1936 and they married there. They bought a second hand twin-engined light aircraft, a Monospar, and decided to fly home to Australia. Their flight began 19 December 1936. They flew by way of France, Italy, Greece, Egypt, Iraq, Iran, Pakistan, India, Burma, Malaya, Java, Timor, Darwin and Moree and arrived in Moree on 15 January 1937.

The Kelmans would own many aircraft over the next 30 years. These were useful for travelling from their remote properties. After her husband's death in 1964, Peggy moved to Brisbane, Queensland and became more involved in the Australian Women's Pilot Association, first as Queensland president, then federal president from 1974–76. She was the Australian head of the international women pilots' association, the Ninety Nines. She was awarded an OBE in 1978 for her services to women's aviation.

== Ivy Pearce Hassard (1914–1998) ==
After taking flying lessons at age 16 when her father gave her her first plane, a Tiger Moth, Ivy Pearce (1914–1998), born in Ipswich, Queensland, took her pilot's 'A' licence in 1935 and went on to become a successful pilot. Her first passenger was Brisbane's Catholic Archbishop James Duhig. She won many races, was proficient at air acrobatics, and was ranked the fastest female pilot in the Adelaide Centenary Air Race of 1936. Ivy Pearce married fellow pilot, Captain Ernst Jason Hassard in 1937. Their marriage was marked by a fly-over by three female pilots. By 1950, she was no longer flying and would go on to become a successful fashion industry icon of the Gold Coast, Queensland.

== Amy Gwendoline Stark Caldwell OBE (1910–1994) ==
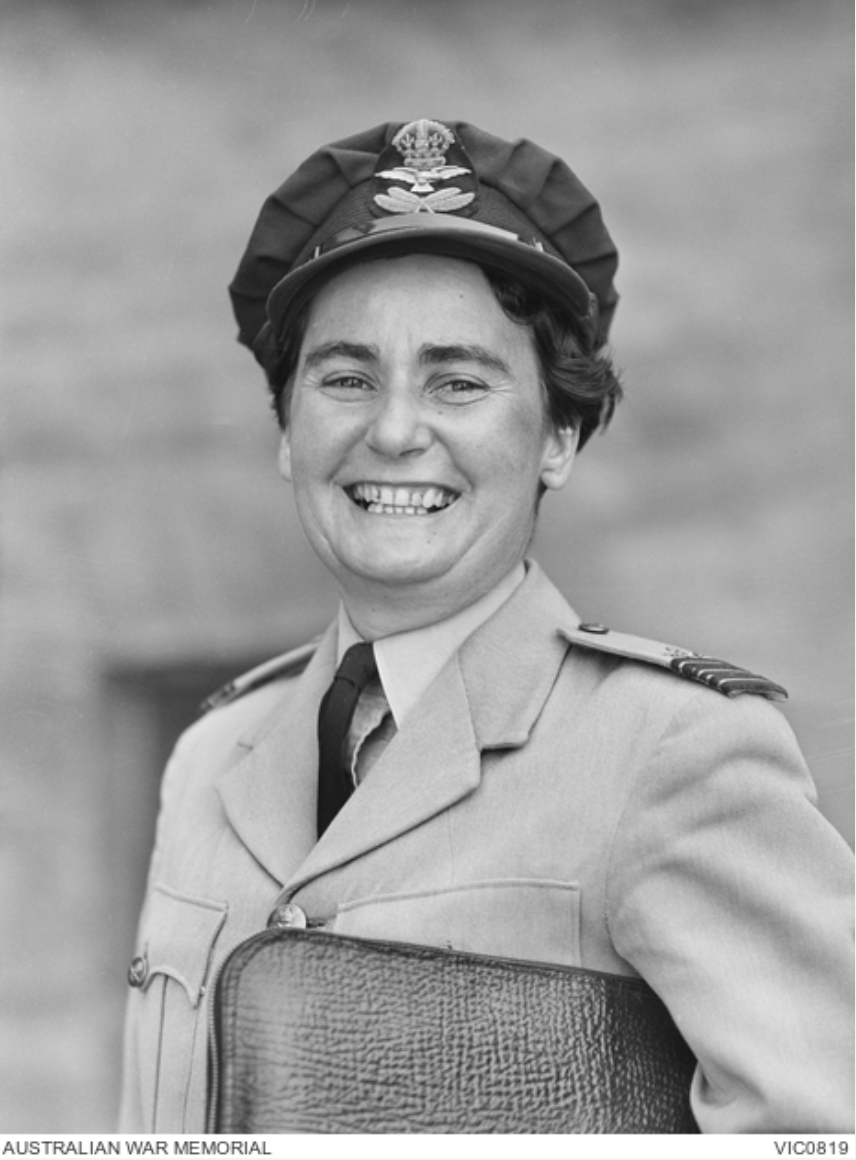
Gwen Stark

Gwen Stark, born in Bondi, New South Wales, gained her pilot's licence in 1939 and was one of the first women appointed to a position in the Women's Australian Auxiliary Air Force. Before the war, she was an active member of the Australian Women's Flying Club. This would become the New South Wales branch of the Women's Air Training Corps during the War, and she was its commandant in 1940. After World War II, Stark travelled to Europe and worked with the Berlin Air Lift at a Royal Air Force station in Germany for several months. In 1964, Stark became the federal president of the Australian Women's Pilots' Association. She was appointed to the Order of the British Empire in 1968 for her services to aviation. Stark would marry William Caldwell.

== Nancy Ellis Leebold MBE (1915–1982) ==
Nancy Ellis, born in Mile End, South Australia learned to fly at the Royal Aero Club of New South Wales, Mascot. She gained her private pilot's 'A' licence in 1942 and her commercial licence 'B' in 1946. She earned her instructor rating and worked for Kingsford Smith Aviation. In 1950, Ellis became the first Australian woman to fly heavy aircraft (over 12,000 lbs). She was First Officer of a Lockheed Lodestar for Air Cargo Pty Ltd. She also became one of the 35 charter members of the Australian Women Pilots' Association begun in 1950.

In 1952, she flew to the U.S. and piloted a Lockheed Shooting Star T33A. This flight earned her the distinction of becoming the first Australian woman to fly a jet aircraft. Ellis became the first Australian woman to work as a chief flying instructor (at Dubbo Aero Club) in 1953.

After receiving an Amelia Earhart Memorial Scholarship in 1954, Ellis studied in the U.S. and England, where she met fellow pilot, Arthur Leebold and they married in 1955. She flew a single-engine Miles Messenger aeroplane back to Australia with her husband as passenger. The Australian Women Pilots' Association gave her the Evelyn Follett award for the year's most worthy flying performance, after this flight of over 12,000 km.

Leebold spent two years working for Rolls-Royce of Australia Pty Ltd on aeroplane engines. She also toured New Zealand on an aerial agricultural study. She flew a jet aircraft in the USA, the first Australian woman to do so in 1959. She ran her own business, Avmar Pty Ltd, which imported aircraft and marine accessories and offered chartered flights. She was appointed an MBE in 1965.

== Evelyn Follett (1902–1977) ==
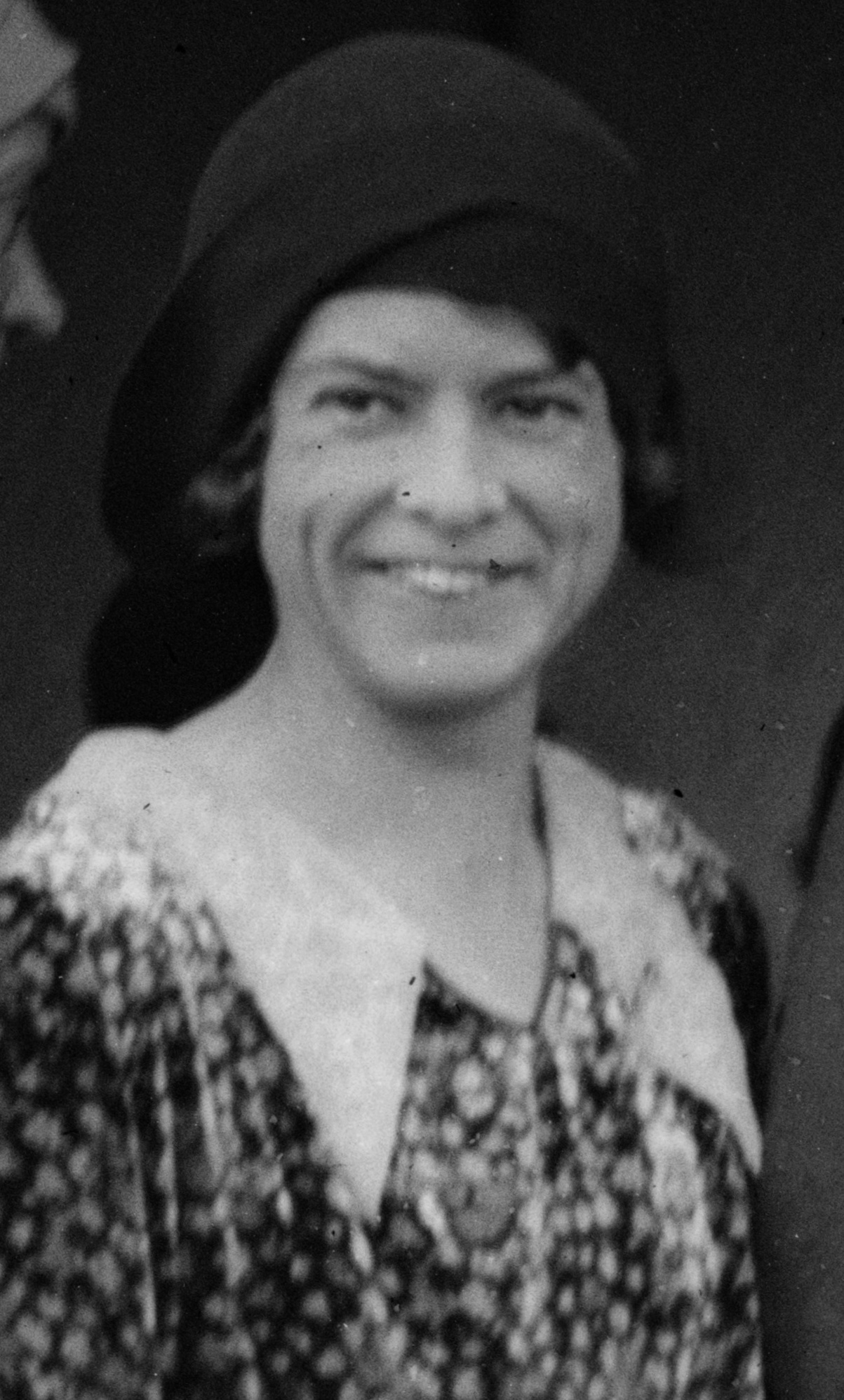
Evelyn Follett, 1930.

In August 1927, Evelyn Follett, born in Marrickville, New South Wales, became the third Australian woman to earn a pilot's licence after receiving training from the Aero Club of New South Wales. A tiny woman, she had to sit on a cushion to reach the controls. She went on to set up an airways administration company, Adastra with her brother Captain Follett and Captain Bunny Hammond. Adastra also offered a flight school in Bega, New South Wales, and would conduct aerial survey services for geophysical study. Follett was one of the five female pilots who flew in formation with Amy Johnson when she made her landmark arrival into Sydney during her England-Australia flight in 1930. Follett donated a trophy to the Australian Women's Pilot Association in 1954, to recognise a noteworthy feat by a female pilot each year.

== May Bradford Shepherd (1897–1937) ==
After divorcing her husband, May Bradford Shepherd (born May Bradford, the name she also used professionally) from Rubyvale, Queensland, overheard a conversation about aviator Amy Johnson, which fired her competitive spirit. It inspired her to take flying lessons in Brisbane, Queensland in 1930 and she attained her "A" Licence on 16 January 1931. Her training colleagues at RQAC were Lores Bonney and Keith Virtue. She went on to become the only woman In Australia to hold first class pilot's 'A' and 'B' licences together with 'C' and 'D' Ground Engineer's Licences. In addition she also attained a "X" Licence for Aviation Welding. May became the first female licensed aircraft engineer in Australia. And with her flying licences she became the highest qualified female in aviation in Australia and the British Commonwealth Financial constraints stopped a planned trip to England. She completed the Adelaide Centenary Air Race of 1936 along with female pilots, Nancy Bird, Lores Bonney, Freda Thompson and Ivy Pearce. She flew the plane she had built in the workshops at Mascot in this race, a Klemm Eagle. Bradford worked as a commercial pilot at Mascot, taking passengers on chartered flights while continuing working on aircraft in the hangars. She proudly said she was doing "A man's job at a man's wage." An accident on take-off at Mascot in January 1937, when the left strut of her undercarriage clipped the left wing of another aircraft that had taxied on to the takeoff field, ended in a fiery crash, incinerating Bradford and her two passengers.
