= May Bradford Shepherd =

Australian aviator (1897–1937)

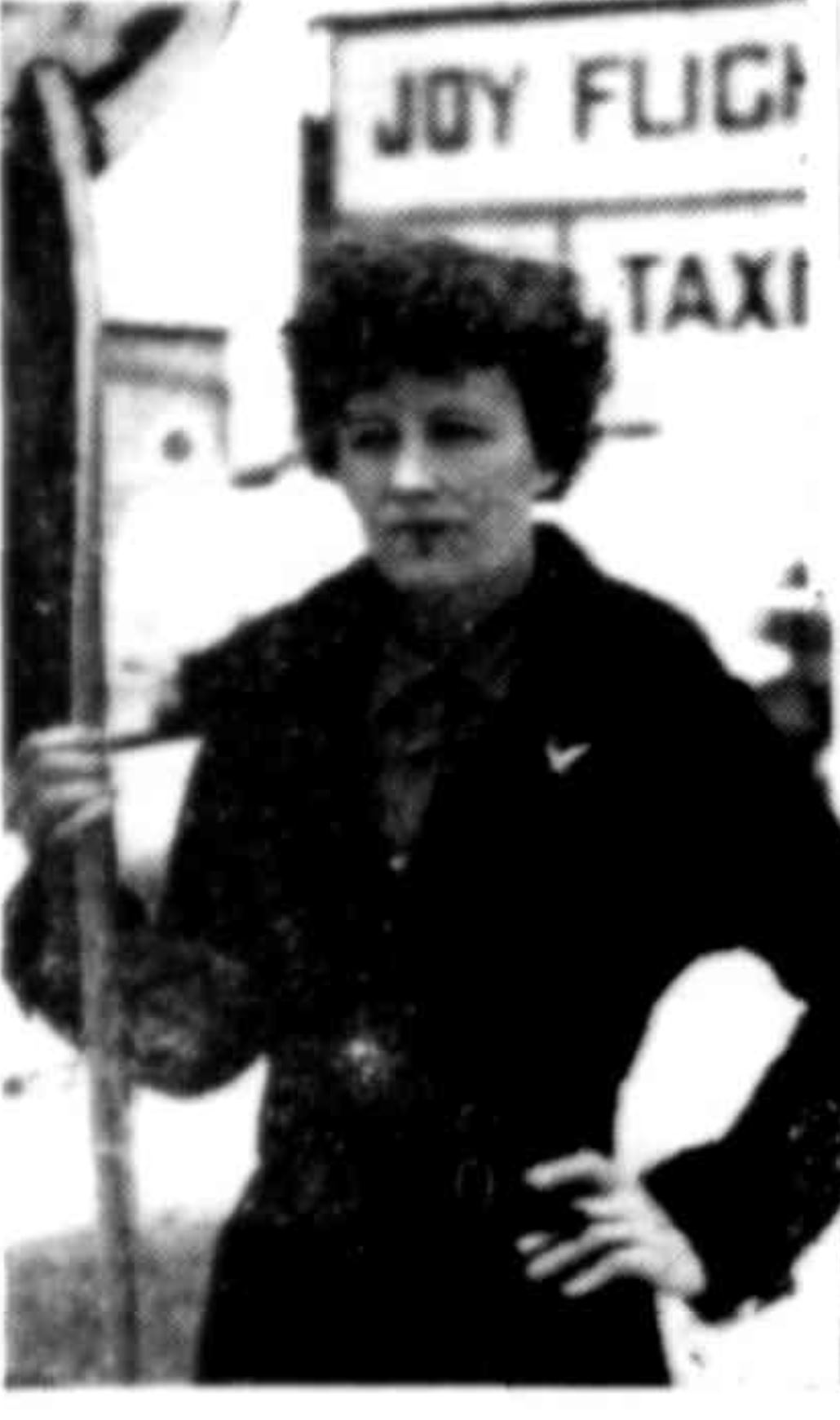

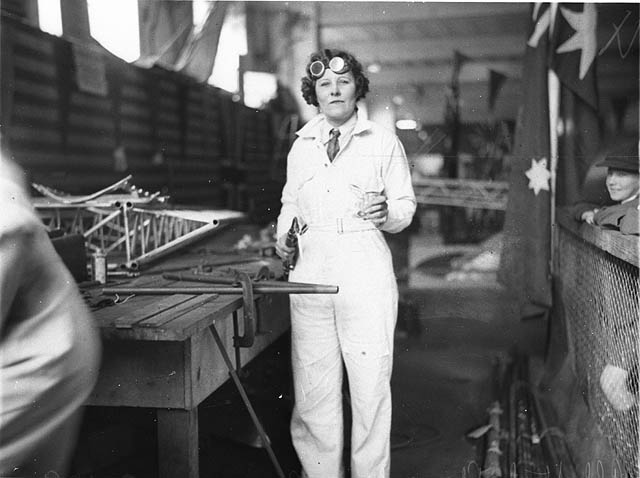
May Bradford welding part of the all Australian monoplane for the England-Australia air race, 1934

May Gertrude Shepherd (née Bradford; 1897 – 24 January 1937) was an Australian aviator and the first woman in Australia to hold first-class pilot's 'A', 'B' and 'C' licences concurrently, in addition to a 'D' electrical ground engineers' certificate. She was also the first and the only woman in Australia, at the time, known to hold a 'X' certificate in oxy-welding and metallurgy.

== Life ==
Bradford was born in Bega, New South Wales and grew up in Rubyvale, Queensland where her father, John 'Charles' Bradford, had been involved in the mining industry as a prospector and washing plant owner since approximately 1902.

Having been a member of Fitzgerald's circus, Charles with his wife Emily, was also the proprietor of Bradford's Surprise Party Circus and Piano Orchestra which featured members of the Bradford family performing musical and comedy numbers and offering a program of acrobatic and trapeze acts held within their own marque or inside meeting halls throughout Far North Queensland in the early 1900s.

May Bradford was an accomplished horse rider, competing in shows and being awarded the fastest time ever recorded by a man or woman for hunt riding on the Brisbane Showground in 1920. She was also an expert rifle shot and sportswoman. Bradford followed her father's second profession and became a qualified gem expert selling sapphires and opals.

She married Francis Shepherd (10 April 1894 – 20 November 1933) in Rockhampton on 24 November 1919. They had two sons, Francis 'Frank' Roy (15 August 1921) and Henry 'Harry' James (11 November 1923), before her husband's death from injuries sustained some years earlier at Galipolli in World War I.

Bradford became interested in aviation after overhearing a conversation in a cafe about how an Australian woman would never undertake the flight made by Amy Johnson between England and Australia in 1930. Bradford received flying lessons from Captain Harold Livingstone Fraser at Connor Park before moving to Brisbane to continue training at the Queensland Aero Club. She funded her lessons by selling gems, achieved her pilot's licence in 1931 and started working as a commercial pilot.

Bradford spent at least four years as an apprentice mechanic at Sydney Airport and worked as a ground maintenance engineer for New England Airways. She had purchased her own aircraft, a Klemm Eagle but, being unhappy with the paintwork, sanded it back and repainted it in red, black and gold. She choose her own insignia, a golden eagle, and designed it herself based on one she saw on display at the Sydney Museum. She outfitted the interior of her plane with grey silk, included book holders and named it the Golden Eagle.

Bradford crashed a De Havilland D.H. 60 Moth VH-UQT in a paddock one mile south of the Goulburn Aerodrome on route to Mascot Aerodrome on 2 December 1933 at 2.15pm. She escaped practically unhurt but was suffering from the effects of shock

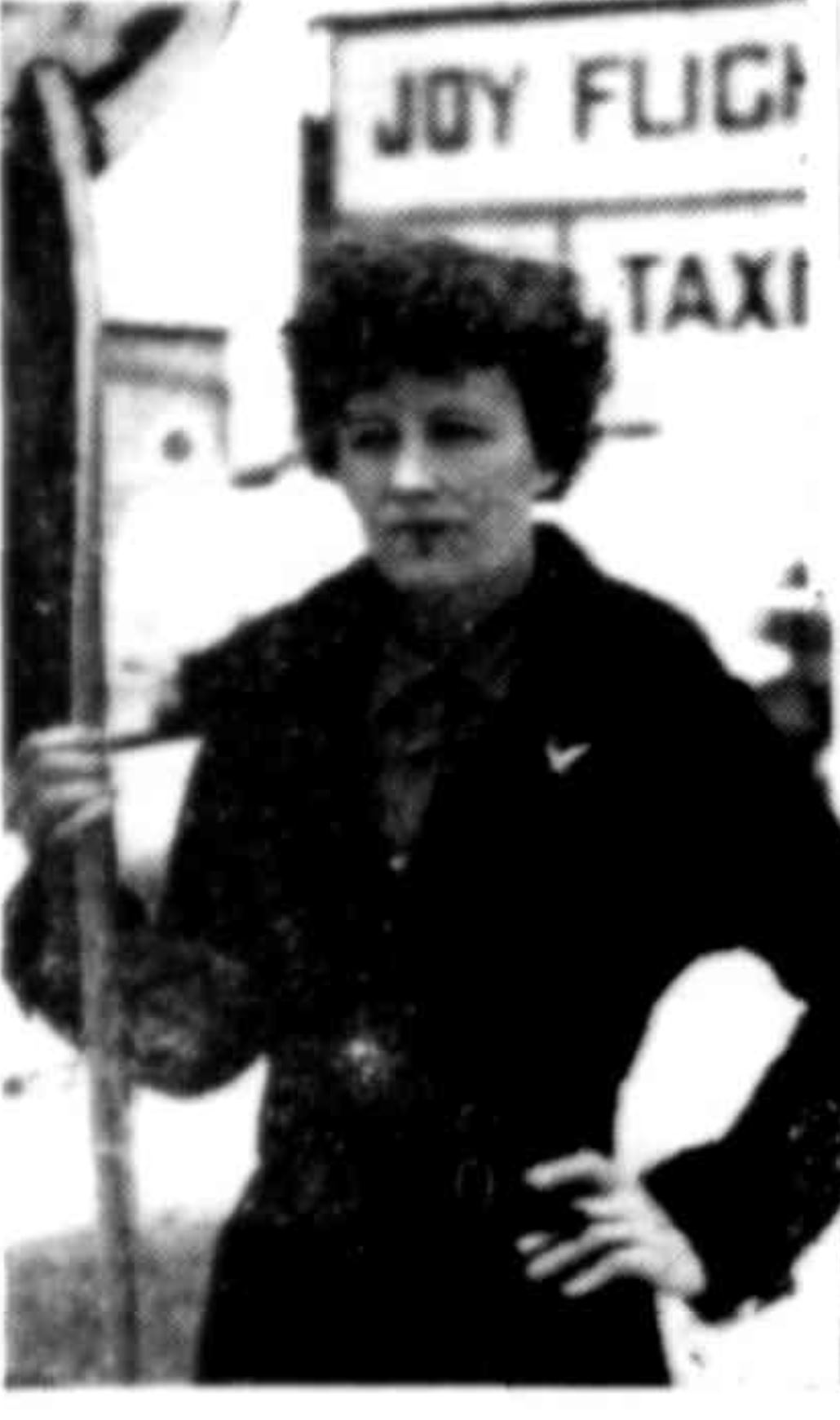
May Bradford, at Parafield Airport for the Adelaide Centenary Air Race

In 1936, she was one of the five female pilots in the Adelaide Centenary Air Race along with Nancy Bird, Lores Bonney, Freda Thompson and Ivy May Pearce. She completed the race in her Golden Eagle which was able to reach a ground speed of 175 miles per hour. While she was forced to stop the race on a number of occasions to tend to her aircraft, as a licensed engineer Bradford was able to undertake the repairs herself.

Bradford offered joy rides around Sydney in her plane and would transport people where ever they required. She was planning a flight to London before she was killed with her passengers, Mrs Harriett Mastery (known as Miss Coley) and Miss Ellen Latimer, when her Klemm Eagle clipped the wing of a plane being piloted by George Hoskins at Sydney Airport on 24 January 1937.
