= Aileen Dent =

Australian artist (1890–1978)

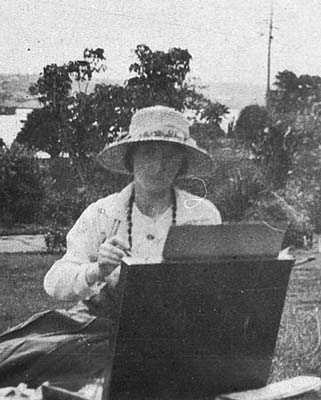
- Born: Aileen Rose Dent; 1890; Deniliquin, New South Wales, Australia
- Died: 1978 (aged 87–88); Wagga Wagga, New South Wales, Australia
- Known for: Painting

Aileen Rose Dent (1890 – 30 March 1978) was an Australian artist known for her portraits, specifically her portrait of Australian aviator Jean Burns.

== Biography ==
Dent was born in 1890 in Deniliquin, New South Wales. From 1909 to 1916 she was a student at the National Gallery Art School in Melbourne.

Dent exhibited regularly at the Atheneum Gallery and was a finalist in the Archibald Prize many times. Her paintings were included in the exhibit Australian Women Artists, One Hundred Years 1840–1940.

The National Gallery of Australia owns Dent's portrait of Dame Elizabeth Couchman.

Dent died in Wagga Wagga in 1978.

== Works ==
The Charles Sturt University Art Collection holds the largest collection of her works, however her portraiture exists in other public and private collections. Works include:

- Portrait of Jean Burns 1934
- Portrait of H. P. Zwar 1937
- Portrait of Mrs Ryland 1927
- Portrait of Magnus Lagerlof 1935
- Portrait of Dr. H. Friedman 1932
- Portrait of C. Rigby C.B.E. 1942
- Portrait of Miss Gillman-Jones 1928
- Portrait of the Hon. King O'Malley 1934
- Portrait of Major General A. C. Short, CB, OBE 1954
- Portrait of Dr. Roland Wettenhall, M.B., B.S., F.R.A.P. 1952
- Portrait of Mr. Henry Searby, M.S. F.R.C.S., Q.H.S. 1953
- Portrait of Professor Boyce Gibson 1930, finalist, Archibald Prize, 1930
- Portrait of Professor H. F. Schraeder 1927
- Portrait of Albert Edward Swanson, Esq. 1925
- Portrait of Hon. R. K. Whately, MA, MLA 1955
- Portrait of Brin Newton John, Esq. M.A. 1956
- Portrait of Miss Joyce Raymond 1938
- Portrait of Sir John Jungwirth, Secretary to the Premier of Victoria 1958
- Portrait of Rev. J. Noble-MacKenzie 1940
- Portrait of Professor H. C. Summers 1943
- Portrait of Rev. Henry Evans 1945
- Portrait of Sgt. W. Geoffrey Smith 1943
- Portrait of Professor John Gillies 1940
- Portrait of C. N. McKenzie, Esq. 1939
- Portrait of Rev. A. J. Stewart 1944
- Portrait of Hon. Sir Frederic W. Eggleston 1944
- Portrait of Sir Charles Lowe 1950
- Portrait of Dr J. M. Baldwin, astronomer 1941
- Portrait of The Right Rev. G. A. Wood, BA 1962
- Portrait of John Allan, Premier of Victoria 1928
- Portrait of Robert McLeish, President of the Green Room Club ca.1950

== Exhibitions ==
- 1943, from 1 December; Inclusion in a group show of ninety-one paintings and etchings with Arnold Shore, Max Meldrum, John Rowell, Jas. Quinn, John Farmer, Mary Hurry, Dora Serle, Margaret Pestell, Dora Wilson, Isabel Tweddle, Allan Jordan, Murray Griffin, George Colville, and Victor Cog. Hawthorn Library.
