= Bobby Terry =

Person actively involved in flying an aircraft

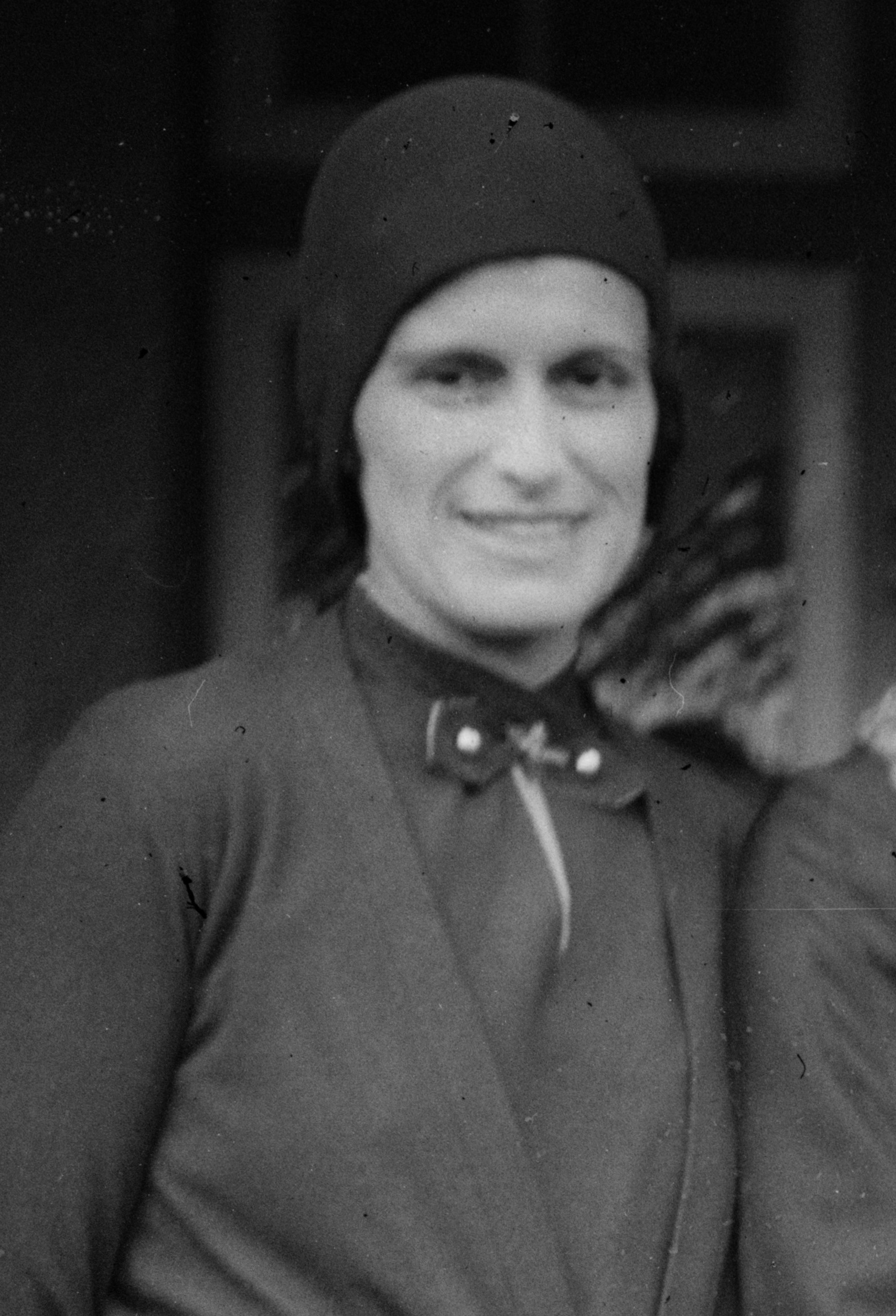
Terry at the Queen of the Air pageant, Mascot, 1930.

Florence "Bobby" Mary Terry (née Taylor), (1898–1976), was an Australian aviator. She was the first woman to own her own airplane in Australia, the first woman endorsed to fly seaplanes and the second woman to obtain a commercial pilot's license in Australia.

== Life ==
Terry was the daughter of Captain R. S. Taylor of Brisbane, Queensland.

She was the second wife of John Edgar Terry (1884–1934) with whom she had one child who died in infancy. In 1938, she married fellow pilot Monte Fowler.

Terry obtained her 'A' pilot license in 1928. In 1929 she received her the endorsement to fly seaplanes after lessons in a Dornier Libelle under the instruction of Jerry Pentland. The following year, 1930, she obtained her 'B' pilot license.

Evelyn Follett, Bobbie Terry, Margaret Skelton, Amy Johnson, Alice Upfold, Freda Deaton, Phyllis Arnott, Margaret Riordan

In 1930, Terry and five other early Australian female aviators escorted English aviator Amy Johnson in six planes into Sydney as Johnson completed her solo flight from London. The other pilots were Margaret Skelton, Evelyn Follett, Alice Upfold, Phyllis Arnott and Freda Deaton.

She was a member of the Ninety-Nines and flew a Dutch Koolhoven FK41.
