= Margaret Trist =

Australian short story writer and novelist (1914–1986)

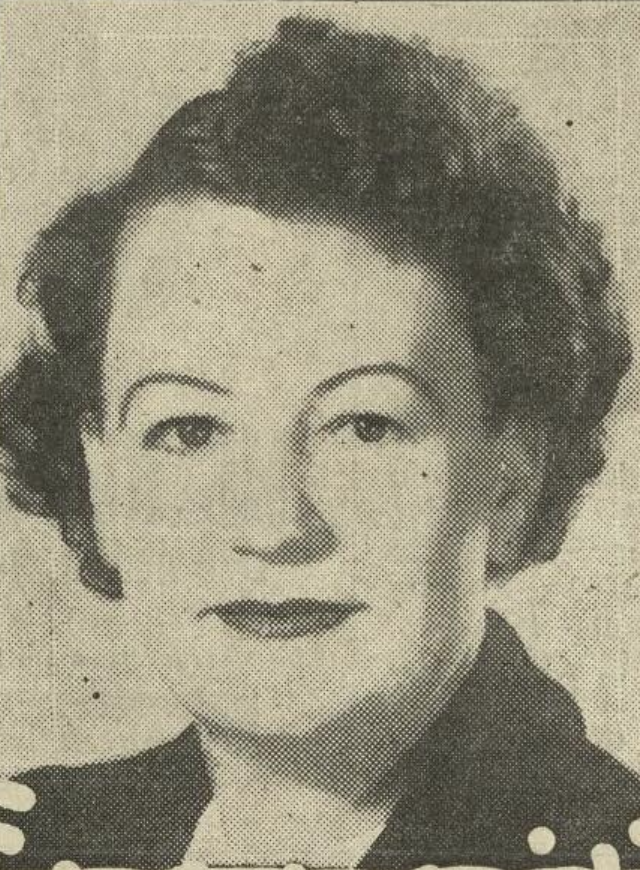
- Trist in 1952
- Born: Margaret Bethesda Lucas; 27 October 1914 Dalby, Queensland, Australia
- Died: 2 March 1986 (aged 71) St Leonards, New South Wales, Australia
- Notable works: Now That We're Laughing, Morning in Queensland

Margaret Trist (27 October 1914 – 2 March 1986) was an Australian novelist and short story writer.

== Early life and education ==
Margaret Bethesda Trist was the daughter of Olga Hargreaves Lucas, no father's name being registered on her birth certificate. Born on 27 October 1914 in Dalby, Queensland, she grew up with her maternal grandparents and was educated at St Columba's Convent in Dalby.

== Career ==
Trist moved to Sydney in 1931 where she took clerical jobs.

Trist's first appearance in print was in The Sydney Morning Herald in June 1935 when a two paragraph story titled "A Grey Headstone: "Sarah, Relict of Thomas" appeared. An avid reader of The Bulletin while growing up, her short stories published in that periodical from 1936. As well as The Bulletin, her work was published in the literary journals Meanjin and Southerly.

In 1938 she was one of ten writers to share the short story prize in the 150th literary competitions, Katharine Susannah Prichard and Hal Porter being among the others.

Her first novel, Now That We're Laughing, was well received. "D.E.", when reviewing it for The Sydney Morning Herald in 1945, referred to her as "a talented and leading writer of short stories" and continued: "The people and the setting are vivid and real, and the novel exemplifies the truth that the best material for art comes from the ordinary things of everyday life. It is in her descriptions of these commonplace things that Margaret Trist is at her best."

In 1958 her best-known novel, Morning in Queensland, was published, and met with immediate critical acclaim. The novel was heavily autobiographical, and depicted rural life in 1920's Queensland with accuracy and humour. The novel was one of five shortlisted for the Miles Franklin Award that year, translated into several languages and published in the US.

Similarly accurate, detailed descriptions of Sydney, the lower Blue Mountains and other regions Trist observed appear in her other works, which form a rare record of social history and everyday dialogue.

Her work appeared in the annual Coast to Coast anthologies of 1941, 1942, (one of the 21 stories selected from 300), 1943, 1944, 1945 (two), 1947, 1951–52, 1959–60 and 1963–64.

In 1966 Trist was one of the screenwriters for episodes of Skippy.

== Personal ==
In 1933, she married playwright and public servant Frank Mumford Trist. They made their home on the lower North Shore, aside from a few years in the artistic community of the Blue Mountains, and raised a son and daughter.

Both Frank and Margaret were instrumental in the establishment of PEN and Sydney University's English Association, devoting much of their personal time to supporting other artists professionally and nurturing the development of a thriving arts community in Australia.

Trist died at St Leonards on 2 March 1986. Her husband had predeceased her in 1980. She was survived by her two children.

== Works ==
=== Novels ===
- Now That We're Laughing (Angus & Robertson, 1945); published in New York as Sun on the Hills (Harper & Brown, 1946)
- Daddy: A novel (Angus & Robertson, 1947)
- Morning in Queensland (W. H. Allen, 1958); re-published as Tansy (University of Queensland Press, 1991)

=== Short stories collections ===
- In the Sun (Australasian Medical Publishing, 1943) – collection of 22 short stories
- What else is there? (Angus & Robertson, 1946)

== Legacy ==
Trist Street in Franklin, Australian Capital Territory, was named in her honor.
