= George Bernard Roskell =

Australian architect (1850–1926)

George Bernard Roskell (1850–1926) was an architect in Queensland, Australia. Some of his works are now heritage-listed.

== Early life ==
Roskell was born in 1850 in Calcutta, West Bengal, India, the son of sea captain Nicholas Wilfred Roskell and his wife Mary Charlotte Agnes (née Jones).

== Architectural career ==
Roskell was articled to architect EW Pugin in Dublin, Ireland. Pugin and his architect father Augustus Pugin were responsible for the design of a large number of Gothic Revival ecclesiastical buildings in Britain and Western Europe.

Roskell migrated to Sydney in 1881. In Sydney, he worked in partnership with John Bede Barlow between 1885 and 1891. The 1887 Church of St Canice in Rushcutters Bay and the 1889 St Francis of Assisi Church in Paddington, designed by the practice are both on the Sydney Local Heritage Register. Roskell then went to New Zealand, working for two firms known for their ecclesiastical projects.

Roskell relocated to Queensland as an employee of the Department of Public Works in 1907. Living in Dalby from 1909, he worked as clerk of the Dalby Town Council and also ran an architectural practice responsible for the Dalby National Bank (1910), the Dalby Hospital (1914) and the Wambo Shire Council offices (1916).

== Later life ==
Roskell died on 28 January 1926, at Parramatta, Sydney, aged 76 years old after a short illness.

== Significant works ==
- 1913: St Columba's Convent, Dalby
