= Amy Gwendoline Caldwell =

Australian pilot and air force officer

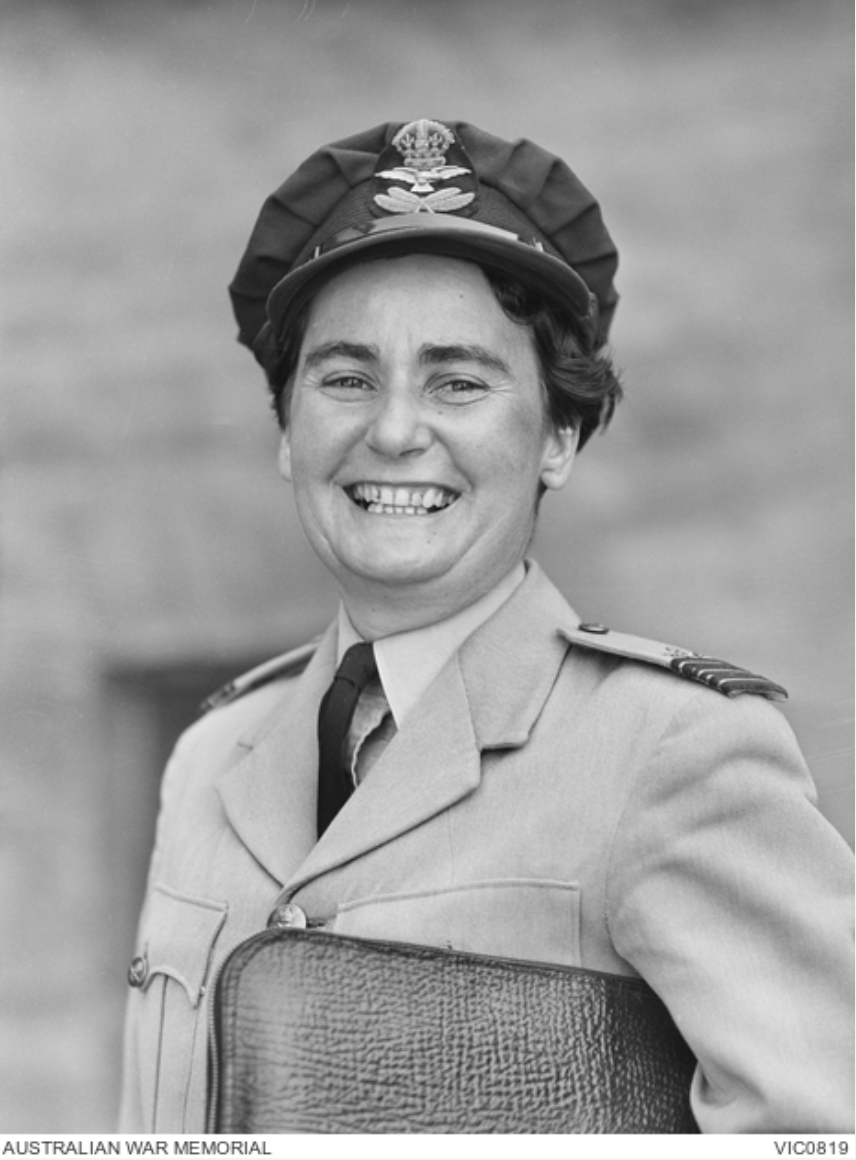
- Nicknames: Gwen; Starkie
- Born: Amy Gwendoline Stark; 3 April 1910; Bondi, Sydney, New South Wales, Australia
- Died: 28 November 1994 (aged 84) Mona Vale, Sydney, New South Wales, Australia
- Allegiance: Australia
- Branch: Women's Auxiliary Australian Air Force
- Service years: 1941–1946
- Rank: Wing Officer
- Conflicts: World War II
- Awards: Officer of the Order of the British Empire (1968)
- Spouse: William Caldwell (m. 1949)
- Children: 1

Amy Gwendoline Caldwell (née Stark; 3 April 1910 – 28 November 1994), also referred to as Gwen Caldwell, Gwen Stark, and Starkie, was an Australian pilot and air force officer. She obtained her pilot’s licence in 1939 and was among the earliest women commissioned as officers in the Women's Auxiliary Australian Air Force (WAAAF) in March 1941, becoming the first officer chosen in New South Wales. After World War II, she stayed active in aviation and veterans’ groups and served as federal president of the Australian Women Pilots' Association from 1964 to 1965. In 1968, she was appointed an Officer of the Order of the British Empire for her contributions to aviation.

== Early life and education ==
Caldwell was born on 3 April 1910 in Bondi, Sydney, to William Stark, a Scottish-born commercial traveller, and his English-born wife, Amy Louise, née Clarke. She was educated in Sydney, earned her Intermediate certificate, and later trained as a kindergarten teacher at Waverley. She was also involved in the Girl Guides, reaching the rank of warrant captain after seven years.

== Aviation and military career ==
In 1930, Caldwell was among many young Australian women influenced by the visit of British aviator Amy Johnson. In 1938, she began flying lessons at Mascot Airport and earned her “A” pilot’s licence on 10 July 1939. Around this period, she joined the Australian Women's Flying Club, becoming assistant State commandant in 1940. She flew several aircraft from the de Havilland Moth series and developed strong skills in aeromechanics and navigation.

On 10 March 1941, Caldwell was appointed as one of five assistant section officers in the WAAAF and was the first officer selected in New South Wales. Initially stationed in Sydney, she was responsible for recruiting personnel for the new service. From 1942 to 1943, she served on headquarters staff in Townsville, Queensland, and after the Japanese air raids in July 1942, she publicly commended the women under her command.

In 1944 and 1945, Caldwell was based at Wagga Wagga, New South Wales, overseeing the discipline and welfare of airwomen in the North-Eastern Area and with No. 2 Training Group. By 1945, she had reached the rank of wing officer and was serving as a staff officer at RAAF Headquarters. Her service with the WAAAF concluded on 8 August 1946.

== Later life ==
After leaving the WAAAF, Caldwell relocated to a property in Bowral, New South Wales. In 1948, she spent several months in West Germany where, with Lady Tedder, she helped establish Malcolm Clubs to support British airmen involved in the Berlin airlift. She also travelled across Britain studying agricultural and animal-breeding methods that could be applied to her property, and served as Girl Guides district commissioner in Bowral.

Caldwell remained closely connected to aviation after the war. In 1946, she helped form the WAAAF branch of the New South Wales division of the Royal Australian Air Force Association and became its first president. She was active in the Australian Women Pilots' Association for around forty years and served as federal president from 1964 to 1965. She was patron of the WAAAF silver anniversary reunion in 1965 and was appointed OBE in 1968 for her service to aviation.

She was also an amateur filmmaker. The Australian War Memorial holds her wartime home-movie footage of WAAAF life, described as the only surviving material filmed by WAAAF women from their own perspective. In later years, she presented these films at public events and reunions and arranged for an edited, narrated version to be preserved by the memorial.

For many years, Caldwell led the WAAAF contingent in Sydney’s Anzac Day march. She died at Mona Vale Hospital on 28 November 1994 and was cremated at Northern Suburbs cemetery, North Ryde.

== Personal life ==
On 23 July 1949, at St Philip's Anglican Church in Sydney, she married William “Bill” Caldwell, a retired bank manager whom she had met in Britain. They had one daughter.
