= Millicent Bryant =

Australian aviator (1878–1927)

- Born: 8 January 1878
- Died: 3 November 1927 (aged 49)
- Occupation: aviator
- Known for: first woman to earn a pilot's licence in Australia
- Awards: inducted into National Pioneer Women's Hall of Fame

Millicent Maude Bryant (née Harvey, 8 January 1878 – 3 November 1927) was an early Australian aviator. She was the first woman to earn a pilot's licence in Australia, Pilot's Licence No. 71, in 1927. She was also first to receive her pilot's licence in the Commonwealth, outside Britain.

== Early life ==
Bryant was born at Apsley, Wellington, New South Wales. Her parents were Edmund George Harvey and Georgiana Sarah Bartlett Harvey. She was one of ten children.

== Career ==
In March 1927, at age 49, Bryant earned a pilot's licence from the Australian Aero Club of New South Wales. With Evelyn Follett, she is believed to be the first woman to take a flying lesson in Australia and was the first woman to qualify for a private pilot's licence in Australia.

== Personal life ==
Bryant was married to Edward James Bryant. They had three sons (born 1901, 1903, and 1908). She was widowed in 1926.

Bryant died by drowning in Sydney Harbour in 1927, aged 49 years, one of the victims of the Tahiti-Greycliffe Ferry disaster. Five planes flew over her funeral and dropped a flower wreath in tribute. In the year following her death, her sons established the Millicent Maud Bryant Trophy to be awarded each year to the best all round pilot of the Australian Aero Club of New South Wales.

Bryant's leather flying helmet is in the collection of the National Library of Australia.

In 2001, Millicent Bryant was inducted into the National Pioneer Women's Hall of Fame. In 2007, to mark the 80th anniversary of her pilot's licence, an official plaque was attached to her tombstone by the Australian Women Pilots' Association.
