= Australian Women Pilots' Association =

The Australian Women Pilots' Association (AWPA) was founded on 16 September 1950 by Australian aviation pioneer, Nancy-Bird Walton.

The AWPA is organised at the national Australian and state levels. The association supports the interests of female pilots. Any female pilot, or pilot in training can become a member. The association advocates for equal treatment and pay for female pilots, and has a financial support program for the training and further education of individual pilots, including a Lady Casey Scholarship. The Nancy-Bird Walton Memorial Trophy is awarded for "the most noteworthy contribution to aviation by a woman of Australasia".

Its members hold a national annual conference, as well as an annual general meeting.

== History ==
The first official meeting was held at the Royal Aero Club Bankstown, Sydney, New South Wales and was attended by around 50 women. Nancy-Bird Walton was elected the first chair of the AWPA. Maie Casey. Baroness Casey was the first patron. Jacqueline Jones, manager of the Kingsford-Smith Flying School, at Bankstown was elected Federal secretary, and Nancy Ellis, the only woman flying instructor in Australia at that time, became the inaugural treasurer.

Leading up to the establishment of the AWPA, meetings were held in 1949 at the suggestion of Nancy-Bird Walton to foster a closer relationship amongst women pilots.

Lores Bonney was President of the Queensland branch in 1954–56; the state branch later established a trophy in her name. Bonney was awarded the national AWPA Nancy-Bird trophy in 1981.
