= St Columba's Convent, Dalby =

St Columba's Convent (former)
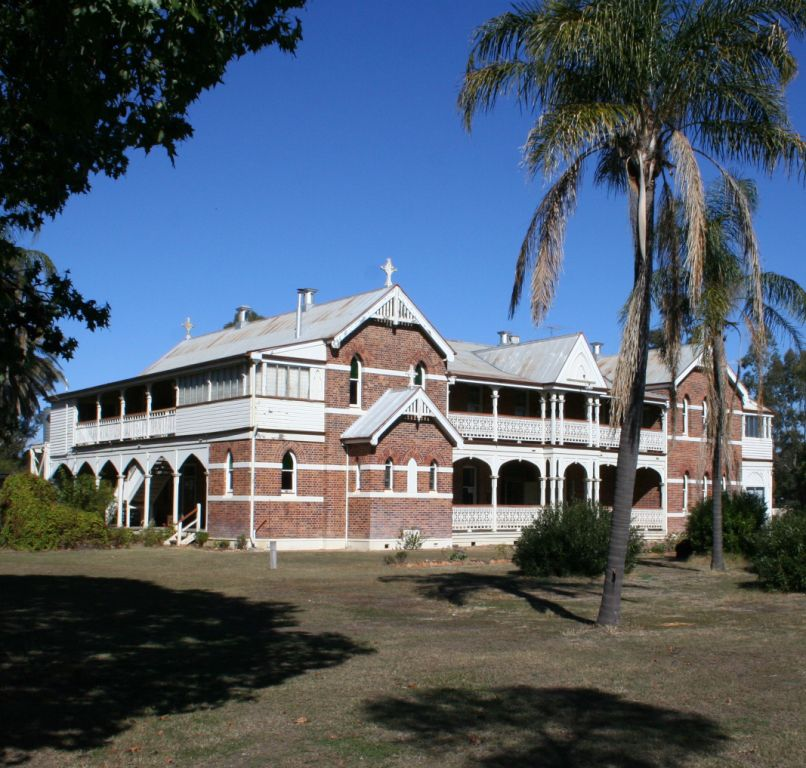
- St Columba's former Convent, 2010

- Location within Queensland Location within Australia
- 27.1864°S 151.2607°E
- Location: 169 Cunningham Street, Dalby, Western Downs Region, Queensland, Australia

History
- Design period: 1900–1910s (early 20th century)
- Built: 1913; 113 years ago

Site notes
- Architect: George Bernard Roskell
- Architectural style: Gothic

Queensland Heritage Register
- Official name: St Columba's Convent (former), Iona
- Type: state heritage (built)
- Designated: 9 December 2010
- Reference no.: 602761
- Significant period: 1913–2010
- Significant components: grotto, convent/nunnery, dormitory wing, chapel
- Builders: John Draney

St Columba's Convent is a heritage-listed Roman Catholic former convent at 169 Cunningham Street, Dalby, Western Downs Region, Queensland, Australia. It was designed by George Bernard Roskell and built in 1913 by John Draney. It is also known as Iona. It was added to the Queensland Heritage Register on 9 December 2010.

== History ==
The former St Columba's Convent was built in 1913 for the Sisters of Mercy from a design by local architect George Bernard Roskell, to provide accommodation for the nuns and the boarding students in their care. At that time, the town of Dalby and its surrounding rural districts were experiencing economic growth. The Sisters of Mercy occupied the convent until 1990, after which it was purchased by the Dalby parish and used as a student hostel, before being leased as a youth and community centre.

Dalby evolved as part of the expansion of one of the most significant pastoral regions in Queensland, the Darling Downs. The township was first laid out by Surveyor Edward Orpen Moriarty in 1852. Due to an error in flood levels, Captain Samuel Augustus Perry, the Deputy Surveyor General of New South Wales resurveyed the township in 1853, naming it Dalby after a location on the Isle of Man. The Town Reserve was declared in the New South Wales Government Gazette in August 1855. Dalby soon had a range of government services, including a post office in August 1854, the declaration of the Dalby Police District in 1855, and the establishment of a National School in 1859. The first urban land sales were held in 1857 and the Town of Dalby was gazetted as a municipality on 29 August 1863. The extension of the Western railway line from Toowoomba to Dalby in 1868 led to a boom in the town which only diminished when the line was extended further west in 1877.

At the time of the appointment of James Quinn as the first Roman Catholic Bishop of Brisbane in 1861, the population of the Colony of Queensland was 30,059, of whom 7,696 (39%) were Catholics. The proportion of Catholics in the main towns of the Darling Downs was: 18% in Warwick, 22% in Toowoomba, 28% in Dalby and 32% in Drayton. Initially Catholic pastoral care in Dalby was irregular; visiting priests had to celebrate mass in local hotels like Josiah Milstead's Plough Inn Hotel from 1855. The first Catholic school in Dalby was established in 1864. Dalby's first Catholic church, St Joseph's was opened by Bishop Quinn in August 1866. In 1876 Quinn instructed Father Denis Byrne, curate of Dalby, to establish a convent in the town, using £400 that the Sisters of Mercy of All Hallows Convent in Brisbane had allocated for the purpose. The Sisters of Mercy, having initially travelled to Queensland with Bishop Quinn in 1860, were integral to the expansion of Catholic schools across the state.

A new commodious version of the Plough Inn Hotel, built in 1863, was sold as part of the estate of pastoralist CC Macdonald. A half share of the property - lots 14, 15 and 16 (originally lots 2, 3, and 4) of section 16 - was transferred to Bishop Quinn in 1876. A small group of Sisters of Mercy arrived in Dalby on 8 August the following year, from the Toowoomba convent established in 1873; and this new Plough Inn became the order's eleventh school in Queensland known as St Columba's. A new timber church designed by Toowoomba architect James Marks was opened in September 1886. By that time, Catholics comprised one third of the population of the Darling Downs.

Dalby's regional prosperity was spurred by a number of legislative processes aimed at rural development in the late 19th and early 20th centuries, including the creation of smaller land holdings and the construction of new railways. The Bell branch railway opened in 1906, followed by the Glenmorgan railway line to Tara in 1908. Dairying and wheat cultivation expanded. A butter factory and a flour mill were established in Dalby in 1906, while the wool industry continued to underpin the rural economy of the area. Despite the dramatic effects of the Federation drought which peaked in 1902, the market for cattle improved in the 1910s, while the price of wool more than doubled between 1900 and 1915.

The growth of the area and the general expansion of the network of boarding schools led to the planning of a new, purpose-built Catholic convent for Dalby. In 1910, 3? acres (1.4 ha) on the corner of Cunningham and Edward Streets were transferred to the Catholic Church. The Roman Catholic Bishop of Rockhampton, James Duhig came in November 1910 to lay the foundation stone of the convent there. In November 1911 local architect George Bernard Roskell called for tenders for its construction. Born in India, Roskell migrated to Sydney in 1881, having previously been articled to E. W. Pugin in Dublin. (Pugin and his father Augustus Pugin were responsible for the design of a large number of Gothic Revival ecclesiastical buildings in Britain and Western Europe.) In Sydney, Roskell worked in partnership with John Bede Barlow between 1885 and 1891. (The 1887 Church of St Canice in Rushcutters Bay and the 1889 St Francis of Assisi Church in Paddington, designed by the practice are both on the Sydney Local Heritage Register.) Roskell then went to New Zealand, working for two firms known for their ecclesiastical projects. He relocated to Queensland as an employee of the Department of Public Works in 1907. Living in Dalby from 1909, he worked as clerk of the Dalby Town Council and also ran an architectural practice responsible for the Dalby National Bank (1910), the Dalby Hospital (1914) and the Wambo Shire Council offices (1916).

St Columba's Convent was opened by the recently appointed coadjutor, Archbishop Duhig, on 8 June 1913, the eve of the feast day of St Columba of Iona. (St Columba had been exiled to this island off Scotland in 563 and later established his ministry there.) A crowd of around 500 visitors attended the ceremony. Father Nolan, the Parish Priest indicated that the convent had cost £7,267 and he needed a further £2,600 to clear the debt. A collection was then taken up, which yielded around £1,600. Speakers praised the efforts of the builder, John Draney and the Clerk of Works, Michael Kelly, as well as the fund raising efforts of the ladies committee. It was expected that subsequent fund raising would focus on building a new church and presbytery for Father Nolan. Michael Kelly departed Dalby the following week to take up the position of Clerk of Works for St Brigid's Church at Red Hill, Brisbane.

The Dalby Herald described the new convent as Gothic in style, standing on a large site, on solid foundations four feet deep, reinforced with rolled joists, bolted together under all the walls of the structure, creating a singular solid frame. Entry to the property was through ornamental iron gates composed of crosses with the name St Columba's Convent emblazoned on them in brass. A gravelled path led to the central main entrance, which had a simple gabled portico again lettered with the name of St Columba's. The front verandah featured sections of cast iron balustrade and all were ten feet wide. Flooring throughout was crow's ash.

The convent's entry doors opened to a hall, flanked on each side by reception rooms, with passageways leading to both wings. To the right was a boarders' study which was separated by 9-foot (2.7 m) high folding doors from a boarders' refectory. Three French doors led to the western verandah, along which were located four music rooms. A nearby staircase led up to the boarders' dormitory. Directly behind the entrance lobby was the nuns' refectory, which included a fireplace and mantle. To the left of the entrance lobby, a grand timber staircase with turned silky oak balustrade ascended to the upper floor. Beyond the staircase was the 63-by-14-foot (19.2 by 4.3 m) chapel. The sanctuary was lit by arched stained glass windows illuminating the altar. A soft shade of green was used in the glass and in the interior paint scheme. The altar, which no longer remains, was designed and built by Trittons Furniture in Brisbane, donated by Mother Patrick of All Hallows in Brisbane and made as a copy of its altar.

The first floor boarders' dormitory occupied the entire western wing and had 16-foot (4.9 m) high coved ceilings. A lavatory and bathroom, with enamelled baths and showers adjoined the dormitory at the rear of the building. The dormitory opened onto front, rear and side verandahs. A corridor led from the boarders' dormitory to an infirmary for smaller children, which had a fireplace. Six nuns' cells 12 by 8 feet (3.7 by 2.4 m), painted in French grey were also located here. The upper floor of the eastern wing housed three more cells and a large community room, the nun's bathrooms and toilets, and linen room. Water was supplied from a bore and from four 2 000 gallon tanks and three smaller rainwater tanks. The convent was one of the earliest buildings in Dalby to have a septic system, the local firm Downs Plumbing and Manufacturing supplying and executing all the plumbing work. Pressed metal ceilings were by Extons.

Ongoing development of Catholic facilities in Dalby included a locally designed school (1916) to the rear of the convent towards Jimbour Street, and a new church (1921) a block to the north-east on Cunningham Street and an adjacent presbytery (1930), both designed by Sydney architects Hennessy and Hennessy. Also in Cunningham Street, St John's Church of England, designed by Toowoomba architect Harry Marks, opened in 1935.

Father Nolan was honoured by the Pope in November 1930 and invested as a Monsignor in St Joseph's Church, when he was praised for the beautiful church buildings erected in Dalby - the convent, church and school. Within the Parish of Dalby, Nolan was responsible for the construction of new churches in Bell (1912), Warra (1913) and Jandowae (1917), Catholic communities which all would have sent children to school in Dalby. In 1930 and 1932 two further churches - at Cecil Plains and Kaimkillenbun respectively - were opened, both under his direction. The well-respected Nolan remained in the parish until his death in 1950. His church building scheme formed part of Duhig's overall program, which produced over 400 buildings in Queensland, including religious, educational and charitable institutions and hospitals.

The chief towns of the Darling Downs - namely Toowoomba, Warwick and Stanthorpe - became, along with Dalby, centres of education with the establishment of a number of day and boarding schools by different Christian denominations. With regards Catholic convents predating St Columba's, of the four built only the Sisters of Mercy Convent of the Assumption built in 1893–94 in Warwick still exists. Around the time of the construction of the convent at Dalby, other Christian boarding schools were established in Toowoomba and Warwick but were not overseen by an order of nuns or brothers. These generally remain in operation with early buildings often having become part of co-educational colleges formed through a process of school amalgamation, such as in Warwick where the Presbyterian Ladies' College (1918) and Scots College for boys (1919) merged in 1970 and now operate as Scots PGC College over two campuses. A brick and timber convent built in Goondiwindi in 1911 and similar in scale to that at Dalby has been demolished. A number of smaller convents and schools were established on the Downs after 1913, including at Allora, Clifton, Crows Nest, Oakey, Miles, Chinchilla and Yarraman. Of these only the Sisters of the Good Samaritan convents at Clifton (1917) and Yarraman (1946) are known to remain, while a number of the schools continue in operation.

Boarding was phased out at St Columba's during the 1960s, while the school continued to expand on land behind the convent along Jimbour Street. In 1963 St Mary's Christian Brothers College was established in Nicholson Street, near the Dalby Airport, to educate boys from grades 5 to 10. St Mary's College became co-educational for grades 8 to 10 in 1980, with St Columba's operating as the co-educational primary school. In October 1990, the Sisters of Mercy departed Dalby, as part of the trend towards co-educational colleges staffed by lay teachers and managed through Diocesan Education Offices. In 1991, the Dalby Parish Finance Committee purchased the convent from the Sisters, upgraded its facilities and established a non-denominational rural student hostel, known as St Joseph's, servicing the regional community. St Columba's school to the rear of the convent was extensively fire damaged in 1998 and the decision made to begin a process of relocation to Nicholson Street. The last of the significant school buildings remaining on the site was moved elsewhere. St Columba's and St Mary's formally merged in 2008 to form Our Lady of the Southern Cross College based at the Nicholson Street campus.

A decline in the Dalby region's rural prosperity led to the closure of St Joseph's Hostel in 1999. The former convent became known as Iona after the relocation of the school. It was then used by a number of community and educational groups. In May 2006 the Myall Youth and Community Network Centre (MYCNC) moved into the former convent, however in mid-2010 it was awaiting completion of purpose-built facilities in Diplock Park opposite Dalby High School.

== Description ==
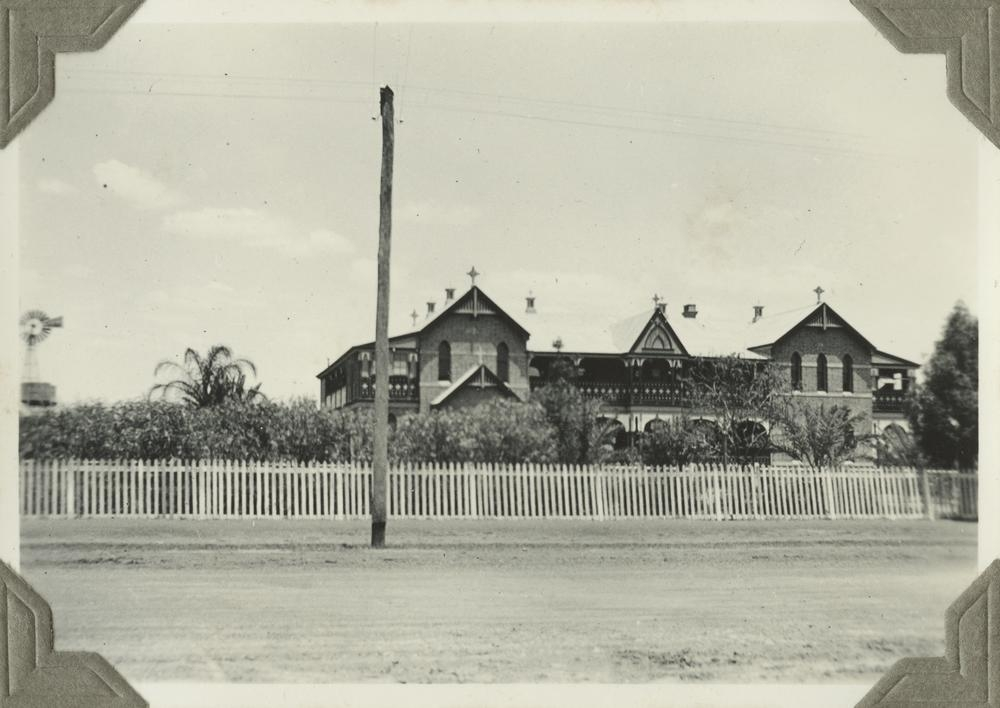
Convent, circa 1935

The former St Columba's Convent occupies a corner block in the south-western part of Dalby, 80 kilometres (50 mi) north-west of Toowoomba on the Darling Downs. Addressing Cunningham Street to the north-west and Edward Street to the south-west, the two storey brick and timber building has a commanding presence on the street. Opposite it along Cunningham Street are the Dalby Ambulance Station and several residences; whilst further to the north-east are St Joseph's Catholic Church and the adjacent Presbytery (not original). The flat allotment covers approximately 2.7 hectares, with the proposed heritage boundary encompassing only its north-western part.

The former convent's plan is H-shaped with a south-western wing extended further to the rear than the north-eastern one. The two storey building stands on concrete footings with various brick piers and timber stumps supporting the verandahs; its core made from reddish bricks laid in English bond, with white render bands at sill and head height decorating the main facade. The brick lintels over the windows and external doors are arched, with either two or three rowlock courses. Throughout the building extensive cracking in the masonry walls is visible both on the exterior and interior.

Some of the building's timber verandahs were originally enclosed with weatherboarding, while others have been more recently enclosed with flat sheeting or chamferboards. Original timber verandah decoration, including stop chamfered posts, decorative post capitals and brackets, and solid timber valances, remains in many parts of the building, particularly on the facade addressing Cunningham Street. The ground floor verandah ceilings are lined with ripple iron sheeting, whilst those on the first floor are raked and have v-jointed timber board linings. Areas of unenclosed verandah have exposed timber floors. An early timber tank stand remains at the rear of the north-eastern wing.

Original timber doors are either single-leaf or French with rectangular fanlights. The former are low-waisted with four solid panels, while the latter are low-waisted with single solid panels at the bottom and two rectangular panes divided by a narrow glazing bar at the top. Some doors appear to have been relocated within the building.

The main roof, clad in corrugated iron sheeting, consists of two parallel long gables over the north-eastern and south-western wings connected by another gabled section over the central building range. The gable ends are decorated with moulded bargeboards and partial timber batten infill. The roofs over the verandahs are broken-backed. Two brick chimneys, painted white, are located above the inner face of the south-western wing, and several metal vents pierce the roof ridges. Celtic crosses adorn the ends of the main gables.

The Cunningham Street facade is largely symmetrical, with a central portico formed in timber and verandahs running behind it between the brick walls of the two main gabled wings. The verandahs here have original cast iron balustrades, painted white, set into timber top and bottom rails. The portico is supported on double posts and topped by a pediment with ornamentation forming a gothic pointed arch. The western gable end has three lancet windows on each floor, with pink and green patterned glass; while the eastern gable end is slightly narrower, with two lancet windows on the upper floor and a projecting bay on the ground with three lancet windows (one filled with sheeting). It has a corrugated iron gable roof and timber gable ornamentation. Under the adjacent verandah a sacristy is formed in brick with lancet windows.

The north-eastern facade retains many of its open verandah areas. A recent timber staircase provides access to the first floor verandah, the southern end of which is clad in weatherboards. At the northern end of this floor the first two bays of the verandah are enclosed with chamferboards and banks of louvered windows. On the south-western facade only a small portion of the ground floor verandah remains unenclosed. A double storey brick section with three original windows divides the facade and houses an original internal staircase. Various window types feature including three-light casements, aluminium sliders and louvers.

The rear facade is dominated by the two projecting wings forming a courtyard. The areas of enclosed verandah are variously clad in weatherboards or chamferboards. A multitude of window types feature, including original timber-framed double-hung sashes, four-light timber casements, and aluminium-framed sliders. There is an original external timber staircase in the verandah area of the central building range. The brick gable ends of both wings feature small ventilation openings.

The interior fabric of the building is largely intact. Most internal ceilings are lined with pressed metal, in a variety of patterns, including ceiling roses and cornices, although modern fluorescent lights and ceiling fans have often been fitted over the roses. All interior masonry walls are plastered and painted; and most rooms and corridors have a timber picture rail positioned either in line with the top of the fanlights or just below ceiling level (rooms without picture rails include the former nuns' cells and the kitchen). Wide timber skirtings line the base of most walls, and timber floors are largely carpeted. The ground floor layout of the former St Columba's Convent remains substantially intact, with only one interior wall removed (in the kitchen). Entry is from Cunningham Street, off the verandah and into a small lobby with reception rooms either side. The elaborate front door is timber-framed and set into an arched opening; with patterned glass lights (green, red and yellow) surrounding the central, low-waisted double door. Some original door hardware remains. On the far side of the entrance lobby is an elaborate doorway into the central corridor. Topped by an open timber-framed fanlight containing the top of a pointed arch and two timber quatrefoils, the doorway has two fixed and two opening leaves, each glazed with five arctic glass lights.

Beyond this a central hallway runs parallel to the main facade, linking the north-eastern and south-western wings. This has a carpeted floor and stop-chamfered edges around openings. Rooms on the southern side of the corridor are the former nun's refectory, a small office (formerly work room) and the main staircase. This features a polished silky oak balustrade. At the south-western end of the former nun's refectory is a fireplace with a carved silky oak mantelpiece. The north-eastern wing houses the chapel, with adjacent brick sacristy. The sanctuary is located in the bay projection at the northern end, separated from the main space by an arched opening and two steps. The stained glass of the sanctuary features flowers and symbols such as alpha and omega, whilst all other windows contain leadlighting in various shades of green. A door leads into the small sacristy and the one connecting to the central corridor has a flashed glass border. The Stations of the Cross are in timber frames surmounted by a small cross.

The south-western wing contains two large rooms at the northern end, with original bi-fold timber doors made of eight panels, approximately 2.7 metres (8 ft 10 in) high, dividing the former boarder's study from the refectory. At the southern end is a kitchen, with an adjacent cold room and pantry inserted where the music rooms were. The kitchen is recently fitted out; however an original stove alcove remains. The floor is covered with linoleum. These rooms contain original doors, windows, timber-lined walls and a corridor leading to the western verandah. The amenities area on the eastern side of the enclosed verandah contains some original fabric, such as doors and board lined walls. The brick enclosed staircase in the north-western corner of this wing has a simple, painted timber balustrade, carpeted stairs and pressed metal on the underside of the upper landing.

On the first floor, the core of the former convent on either side of the central corridor consists of six small rooms, formerly nun's cells, and a large room (former infirmary) currently divided in two. Five of the cells run along the northern side of the corridor, with the sixth adjacent to the main staircase. The enclosed verandah to the rear of these rooms contains a kitchen, dining area and bathroom. The timber floor here is lined with linoleum and the exterior brick walls are unpainted. The north-eastern wing houses a meeting room at the front of the building, three former nun's cells and amenities at the southern end. The south-western wing was formerly a single long dormitory room but is now divided into five rooms by plasterboard-lined partitions and areas of ceiling. The original coved ceiling runs the entire length of the former dormitory and is visible in three of the five rooms, with low plasterboard ceilings in two of the rooms. The former boarder amenities are located in the verandah at the southern end of this wing. Rooms here, which include a large amenities room, retain some original doors, windows and board-lined walls and ceiling. Floors have been lined with linoleum and modern bathroom fixtures installed.

In the former nuns cells there are sections of likely recent wallpaper remaining on the walls. A fireplace with timber mantelpiece identical to the one on the ground floor features in the largest room. The rear external staircase has been enclosed on this level. The meeting room at the front of the north-east wing has two filled doorways on the north-east wall. The three former nun's cells are divided from each other and from the corridor by timber walls lined with vertically jointed, tongue and groove boards. They each have a recent double door opening on to the north-east verandah. The amenities and store room at the southern end of this wing have recent fixtures and linings.

Though largely open lawn, a variety of trees and shrubs are planted along the edges of the St Columba's property and throughout its grounds. Some mature trees as remnants of early planting schemes are significance, such as several mature bottle trees (Brachychiton rupestris) in the front and north-east lawn areas. There is an informal parking area at the rear of the building. The main feature of the front fence is a gateway marked by two original brick pillars.

Near the north-east boundary is a brick pavilion, housing a crucifix statue on a raised platform. It has a gabled, tiled roof and round arches spanning between the corner pillars, some of which are topped by a small cross. Larger crosses sit at the gable peaks and the flat ceiling is lined with pressed metal. On the north-east side of the building, near the sacristy, is a grotto made from stone with a garden in the centre. A statue of the Virgin Mary stands in an alcove in the rear wall and a marble plaque, dedicated to Sister Mary Agatha who died in 1917, is attached to a sandstone block.

A brass plaque in the front garden area commemorates 113 years of the Sisters of Mercy in Dalby. A marble plaque is attached to the northern corner of the main facade commemorates the laying of the foundation stone but is unlikely to be original. Next to the main door is a large brass plaque, commemorating the blessing and reopening of the building as St Joseph's Parish Hostel in 1991.

== Notable residents ==
- Ivy May Pearce, aviator and fashion designer, was a student at St Columba's

== Heritage listing ==
The former St Columba's Convent was listed on the Queensland Heritage Register on 9 December 2010 having satisfied the following criteria.

The place is important in demonstrating the evolution or pattern of Queensland's history.

St Columba's Convent, a substantial brick and timber building constructed and opened in 1913 almost debt-free because of the donations made by parishioners, strikingly demonstrates the prosperity generated through pastoralism and agriculture on the Darling Downs, one of the most productive rural areas in Queensland.

St Columba's, designed by local architect George Bernard Roskell and constructed for the Sisters of Mercy, demonstrates the spread of the Catholic Church in regional Queensland, and in particular the significant contribution played by this order of nuns in the spiritual and educational development of the state through its establishment of convents, schools and boarding accommodation. The order served the Dalby parish for 113 years, occupying St Columba's for 77 of these until 1990.

The place is important in demonstrating the principal characteristics of a particular class of cultural places.

St Columba's Convent is an outstanding and highly intact example of a Sisters of Mercy convent and boarding facility built to serve the prosperous Darling Downs town of Dalby. On Cunningham Street the former convent retains its commanding presence, while its exterior displays further principal characteristics of a building of this type: triple-gabled street facade employing Gothic motifs and a perimeter of timber verandahs. In terms of layout and interior finishes, the former convent is also highly intact and therefore strongly illustrative of this type of cultural place: including ground floor chapel and sacristy, stained glass and leadlight windows, decorative timberwork, refectory and reception rooms and first floor nun's cells and boarders' dormitory with a coved, pressed metal ceiling.

The place is important because of its aesthetic significance.

St Columba's Convent is an elegant architectural composition with great aesthetic merit, with its triple-gabled front facade, walls of face brick with cement rendered bands, and a perimeter of timber verandahs. The cohesive design and scale realised in the convent gives it a commanding visual presence on the south-western end of Cunningham Street, Dalby's main thoroughfare, a quality that it shares with two other ecclesiastical buildings in the block to the north-east - St Joseph's Catholic Church and St John's Church of England.
