= Jean Burns =

Australian aviator (1919–2019)

Jean Ethel Burns
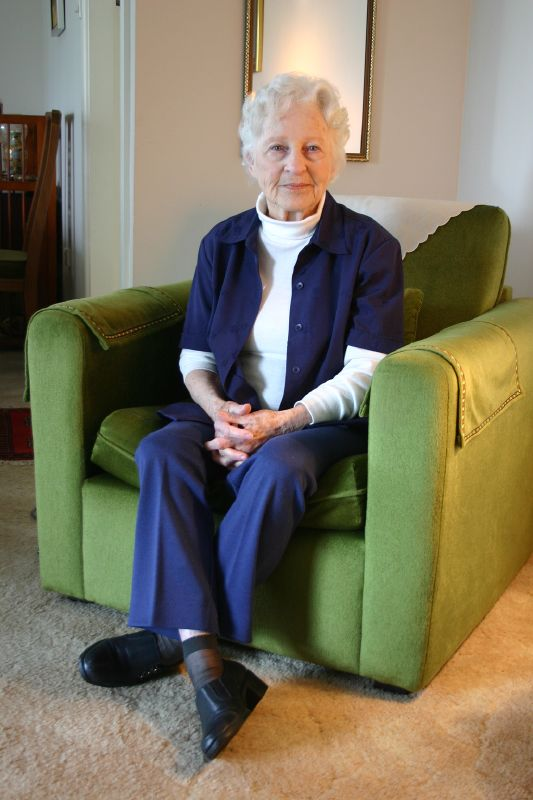
- Born: 14 December 1919; East Brunswick, Victoria, Australia
- Died: 25 May 2019 (aged 99)
- Occupations: Aviator, parachutist

Jean Ethel Burns (14 December 1919 – 25 May 2019) was an Australian aviator. She was the first Australian woman to parachute from an aeroplane over Australia and held the title of being the youngest female pilot in Australia for 15 years.

== Early life ==
Burns was born at Rathdowne Street in the inner Melbourne suburb of East Brunswick. Her father was a merchant seaman. She attended MacRobertson Girls' High School, Albert Park, Victoria, Australia.

== Career ==
=== Flying ===
Burns said she was inspired to fly at age 10 when she visited Essendon Aerodrome, seeing Yorkshirewoman Amy Johnson fly in shortly after having completed the first solo flight by a woman from England to Australia in May 1930.

At the age of 14, Jean joined the Junior Royal Victorian Aero Club and started flying lessons at the age of 17. Graduating with two other young women on 13 March 1937, she obtained her A class pilot's licence and became Australia's youngest female pilot. She held the record until Brigid Holmes broke it as a younger 17-year-old in 1952.

She flew an Ansett Porterfield (Model 35 or Collegiate) with her parachute instructor Mr Felix B Mueller from Melbourne to District Park Aerodrome for the Newcastle Air Display on 19 February 1938.

=== Parachuting ===
Burns made her first parachute descent at Essendon Aerodrome on 21 November 1937 from an Airco DH.4 aeroplane Spirit of Melbourne at a height of 3,200 feet (980 m). She was 17 years old and watched by an audience of somewhere between two and five thousand. The aircraft belonged to Aerat Passenger Flying (Essendon) Pty Ltd and was piloted by Howard Morris Snr. She was reported to have fallen on landing and to have suffered facial abrasions from being dragged along the ground by her parachute. Reports did not mention whether her harness was equipped with quick disconnects to avoid such injury. She was carried away by ambulancemen though not seriously injured.

Burns had planned to actually descend at the age of 16, however the Civil Aviation Department were skeptical at that time, so she waited 18 months before permission was granted on the condition that her parachute be folded by a licence holder.

They thought I was much too young, and I also found it difficult to get a parachute. They cost about 80 pounds.

Her second jump involved another untidy landing and was followed by a letter of warning from officials claiming the jumps were in breach of the law though she would not be prosecuted.

Ambulancemen again came to her aid on her fifth jump, in Newcastle, New South Wales, on 20 February 1938, when winds took her off course resulting in a landing at A Goninan & Co after avoiding two sets of high-tension electricity cables.

Preparing for her sixth jump, planned for 26 February the same year in Sydney, it was reported: "During her five previous jumps, Miss Burns has left the plane from heights varying from 3,200 to 1,500 feet (980 to 460 m). After making her last leap she did not pull the rip cord until she had dropped nearly 500 feet (150 m), which rather worried some of her spectators. 'Until I am down to about 200 feet (61 m) there is a beautiful floating sensation, and then suddenly the ground seems to rush up and meet me. Some parachutists can land on their feet, but usually I take a fall. The landing speed is about twelve miles per hour (19 km/h), and the jar is about the same as you would get if you jumped off a fifteen-foot (4.6 m) wall,' said Miss Burns. 'In the air you can lose height more rapidly by pulling a handful of cords which causes the 'chute to sideslip. There are four red cords which you can pull on the ground to spill the air out so you are not dragged too far.' Mr. Felix Mueller, a licensed parachutist, instructed Miss Burns, and supervised the folding of her parachute, which is a very important item – a twisted cord or a wrong fold of silk would probably mean tragedy." She was also quoted as saying she had taken up jumping to raise funds to buy an aeroplane. The jump, from 2,000 feet (610 m) over Kingsford Smith Airport, resulted in Burns suffering a cut to the chin during descent and abrasions from being dragged along the ground on landing, and she again received treatment from ambulancemen.

Burns only made about a dozen jumps over a period of little over a year.

== Later life and death ==
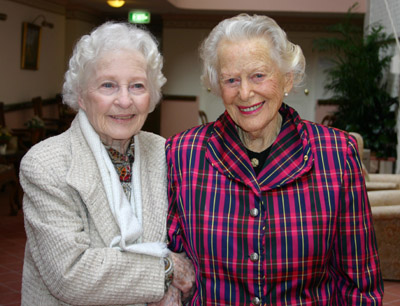
Burns (left) with another pioneering Australian aviator, Nancy Bird Walton (2006)

For the first time, on 21 July 2006, Burns managed to meet Nancy Bird Walton, a fellow aviator and pioneer. They had known each other for most of their lives but never met before.

Burns died on 25 May 2019 after a short illness. She was 99.

=== Street naming at Essendon Airport ===
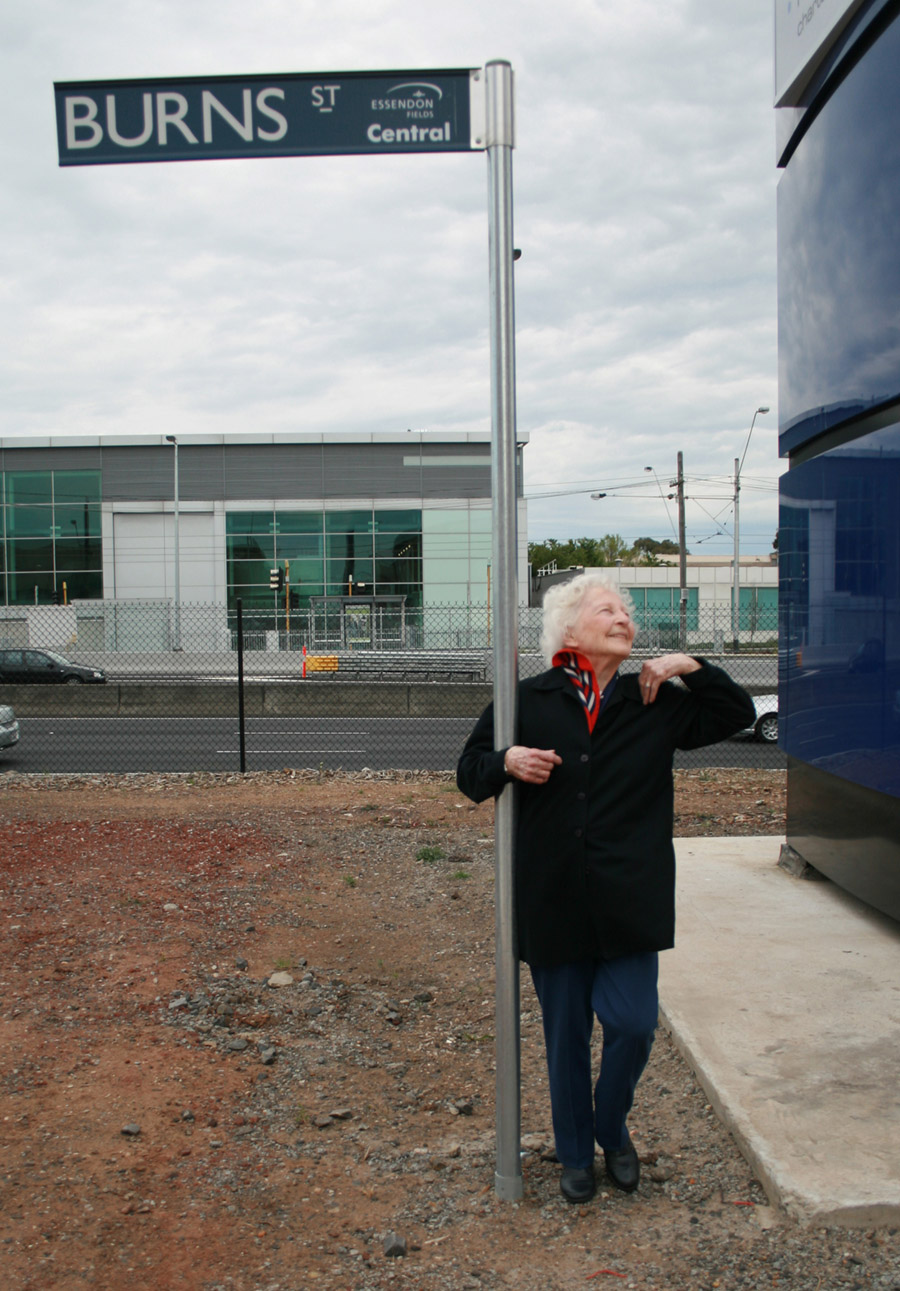
Burns and her new street sign

In October 2008, Burns Street at Essendon Airport was named in honour of her. The street is located within Essendon Fields.
