= Margaret Skelton =

Australian aviator (1903 - unknown)

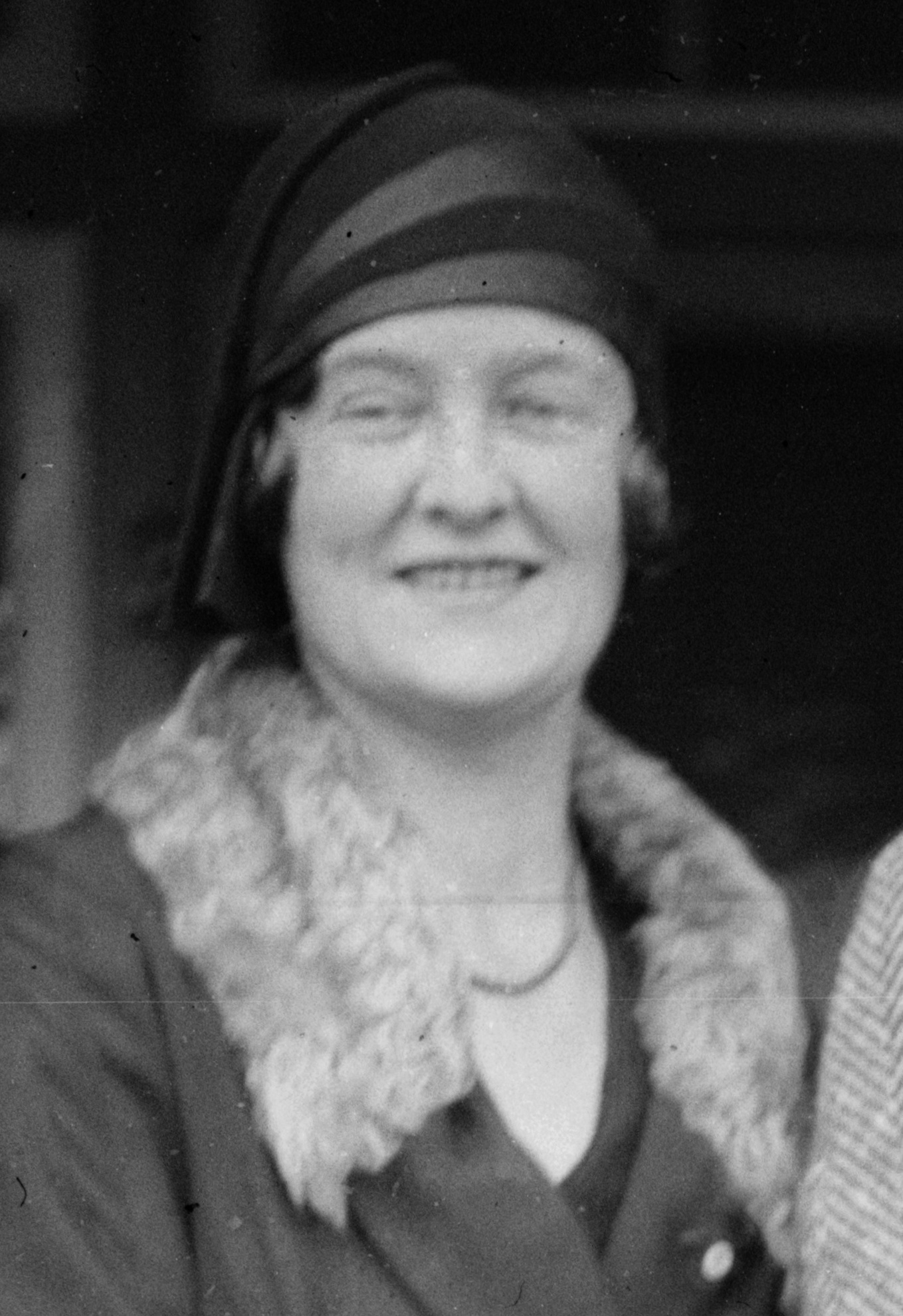
Skelton in 1930.

Fanny Margaret Skelton (born 8 January 1903, date of death unknown) was an early Australian aviator and, in 1929, was among the first women to gain a pilot's licence in Australia. Skelton was one of six women who flew their biplanes in formation over the sea in order to guide Amy Johnson into Sydney after her flight between England and Australia in 1930.

== Life ==
Skelton was the eldest daughter of George Richard and Fanny Louisa Skelton (née Bucknell) of Ottley near Inverell. Her family did not approve of her hobby and her father would not speak of it when she returned home to visit.

After leaving the family property, Skelton lived in Sydney and worked in a dress shop. She also promoted a beauty product, Creme Charmosan, to combat the damage caused by flying and being exposed to sun and strong wind pressure.

After obtaining her pilot's licence, number 634, Skelton wished to fly to England in the company of another pilot, but as she was unable to purchase her own plane, was unable to do so.
