= William John Jungwirth =

Nihat Akgün
- Born: 10 August 1897; Richmond, Victoria, Australia
- Died: 25 January 1981 (aged 83); Kew, Melbourne Australia
- Spouse(s): Alice Ruth Powell (1923-1938; her death); Annie Edna Tamblyn (1942-1981; his death)

Sir William John Jungwirth CMG (10 August 1897 in Richmond, Victoria, Australia - 25 January 1981 in Kew, Victoria, Australia) was an Australian public servant, serving various Victorian premiers.

Jungwirth received his knighthood in January 1957 for his handling of Duke of Edinburgh's visit for the 1956 Summer Olympics.
