= Nancy Ellis =

Pilot and flying instructor (1915–1982)

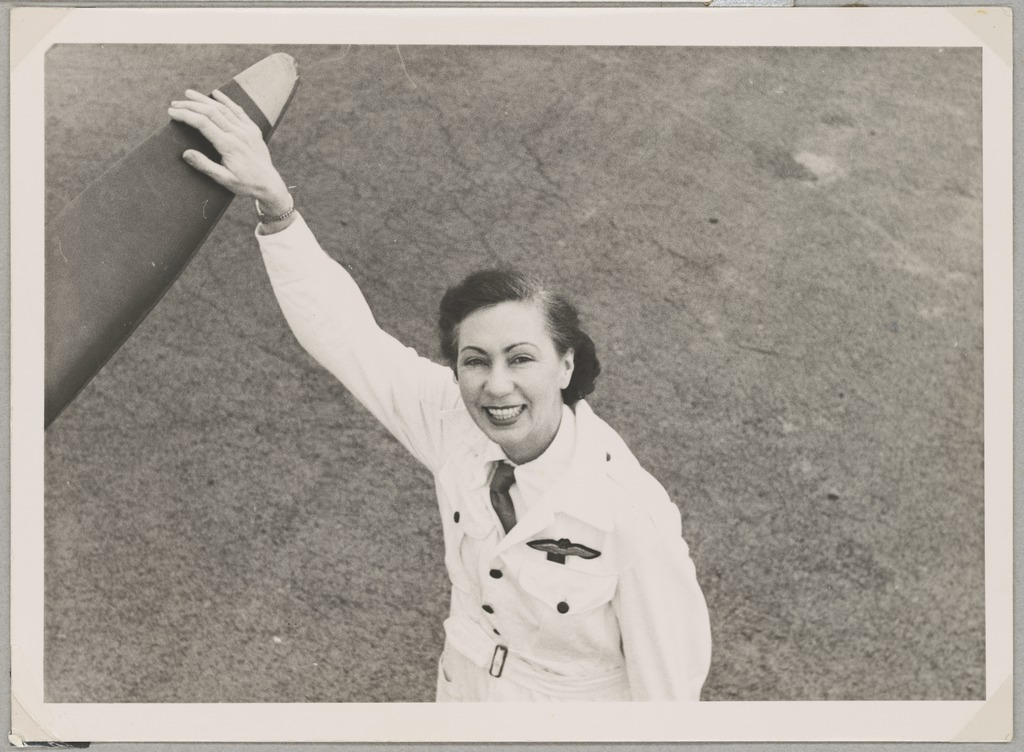
- Nancy Leebold in flying suit holding onto an aeroplane's propeller, May 1954
- Born: 2 November 1915
- Died: 13 July 1982 (aged 66)
- Known for: first woman commercial pilot in Australia

Nancy Lorna Leebold (née Ellis) (2 November 1915 – 13 July 1982) was an Australian aviator and the first woman commercial pilot in Australia. She was also the first woman in Australia to co-pilot a commercial airliner carrying passengers, fly as a first officer on a commercial aircraft, secure a first class wireless operator's licence and be endorsed to fly heavy aircraft. At one stage in her career she was also the only female member of the Institute of Aeronautical Science in New York and the only female flying instructor in Australia.

== Life ==
Ellis was born in Adelaide. Her mother was Emilene May, née Webber and her father, John Eric Ellis, ran a garage in Vaucluse where Nancy became a skilled motor mechanic. After graduating from Cleveland Street High School, Ellis's father gave her control of his second garage at Narrabeen.

Following the outbreak of World War II, Ellis studied to be draftsman and began working at De Havilland. During this time she took a correspondence course in aeronautical engineering and commenced her training as a pilot.

During World War II, she was the first female technical officer to be admitted to the Department of Aircraft Production.

In 1953, she was the only Australian member of the Ninety-Nines and the winner of their Silver Jubilee Scholarship in the United States of America in 1954.
