= Maude Bonney =

Australian aviator (1897 - 1994)

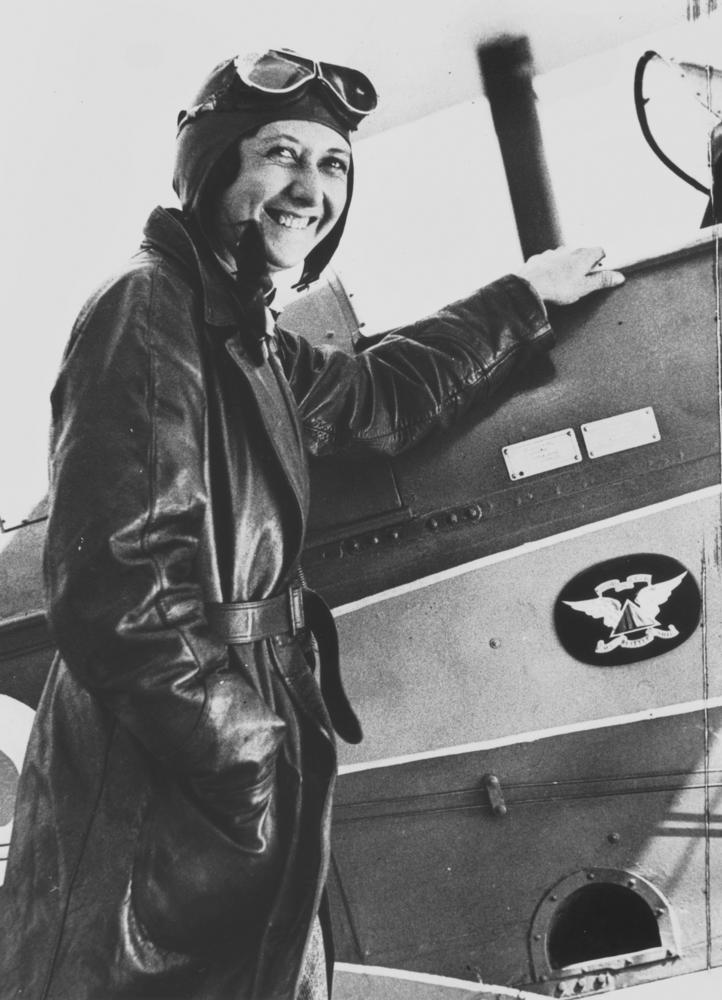
Maude 'Lores' Bonney

Maude Rose "Lores" Bonney, AM, MBE (20 November 1897 – 24 February 1994) was a South African-born Australian aviator. She was the first woman to fly solo from Australia to Britain.

== Early life and education ==
Maude Rose Rubens was born on 20 November 1897 in Pretoria, South African Republic, the only child of Rosa Caroline (formerly Staal, née Haible) and German-born Norbert Albert Rubens, a clerk and later a merchant. She later adopted the name Dolores, shortened to "Lores" (pronounced Lor-ee) in preference to her given names. The family moved first to England in 1901, then to Australia in 1903. After education first in Melbourne, at the Star of the Sea Ladies’ College and the Cromarty Girls’ School, in Elsternwick, she then attended Victoria-Pensionat in Bad Homburg, Germany in 1911 to advance her music studies at a finishing school, becoming an accomplished pianist but suffering from stage fright. At this school she became fluent in French and German, before returning to Australia in 1913.

In 1917, age 19, she met and married Harry Barrington Bonney, a leather goods manufacturer, whilst she was a member of the Red Cross working on the war effort during the World War I war effort. The couple moved to Brisbane, Queensland, Australia and settled in Bowen Hills.

== Learning to fly ==
In 1928 she met Bert Hinkler, Harry Barrington Bonney's first cousin once removed and a Queensland aviator who had set a solo England–Australia record in his Avro Avian biplane (now in the Queensland Museum, Brisbane). His exploits fired her imagination and her first flight in his Avian confirmed her determination to learn to fly. She took her first lessons (initially secretly whilst her husband played golf) with instructor Charles Matheson on 6 August 1930 and gained her private pilot's licence within the year. When she told her husband about her flying, he bought her a de Havilland DH.60 Gypsy Moth which she named My Little Ship.

Bonney's first record breaking long-distance flight was in December 1931 when she decided to spend Christmas Day with her husband in Brisbane, and join her father in Wangaratta, Victoria, 1,173 km south, for lunch on Boxing Day. Leaving Brisbane at 4.30 a.m., she reached Wangaratta at 7.20 p.m., in time for dinner with her father.

== Record breaking flights ==
Her record-breaking flights began and the press started to pay her attention.

1931	DH 60G VH-UPV	Brisbane-Wangaratta	1600 km
1931	Longest one-day flight by an airwoman
1932	DH 60G VH-UPV	Round-Australia	12,800 km
1932	First woman to circumnavigate the Australian mainland by air
1933	DH 60G VH-UPV	Brisbane-Croydon, UK	20,000 km
1933	First woman to fly from Australia to England.
1937	Klemm L32-V VH-UVE	Brisbane-Cape Town	16,826 km
1937	First flight Australia to South Africa

== Later life ==
The outbreak of the Second World War ended her flying career just as she was planning her next flight – around the world, via Japan, Alaska and the United States. The Klemm L32-V VH-UVE was destroyed in a hangar fire in 1939. VH-UPV was requisitioned for the war effort, deployed to a flying training unit, declared unserviceable and scrapped after the war. During the war, Bonney served on the executive of the Queensland branch of the Women's Voluntary National Register. She returned to flying after the war but retired in 1949 due to failing eyesight. During the 1950s she was president of the Queensland branch of the Australian Women Pilots’ Association.

Bonney died at her home in Miami on Queensland's Gold Coast in 1994, aged 96.

== Recognition ==
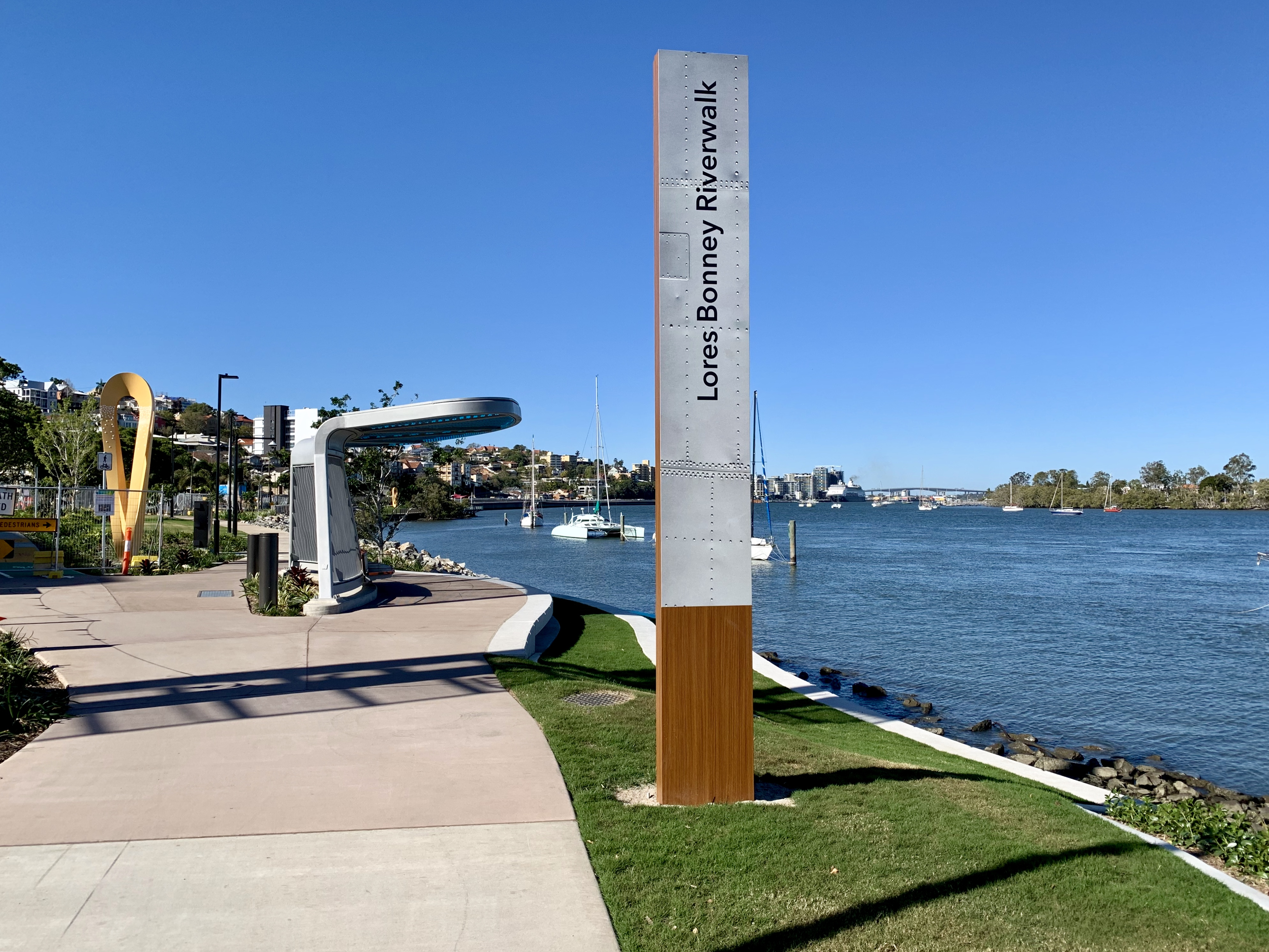
Lores Bonney Riverwalk in Hamilton, Queensland

For her Australia–England flight, Bonney was appointed a Member of the Order of the British Empire by King George V. The Bonney Trophy which she presented in England is still awarded annually to an outstanding female British pilot. The Australian Women Pilots Association has established a trophy in her honour. Lores Bonney was inducted into the "Ninety-Nines", the American society of women flyers who had pioneering roles in aviation. Her name and her wings were placed on the wall of the Flyer's Chapel at California's St. Francis Atrio Mission alongside the names of Charles Lindbergh, Charles Kingsford Smith and Amelia Earhart. Griffith University, Queensland, awarded her an honorary doctorate for her services to aviation.

== Legacy ==
In 2012 she was inducted into the Australian Aviation Hall of Fame.

Despite other women pilots of her era receiving more promotion and publicity, Lores Bonney has been publicly recognised in Brisbane in a number of ways since she died:

- The electoral district of Bonney created in the 2017 Queensland state electoral redistribution was named after her.
- The Lores Bonney Riverwalk was opened in 2019 as part of the Kingsford Smith Drive upgrade project by Brisbane City Council, along the Brisbane River in the suburb of Hamilton.
- Bonney Avenue, in the suburb of Clayfield, Brisbane, is named for her. The street is not too far from the Eagle Farm Airport (old Brisbane International Airport) where she learned to fly.
- An oceanfront lookout at Miami on the Gold Coast is named in her honour.

Bonney featured in a Google Doodle on 20 November 2019, 122 years after her birth.

== Awards ==
- 1934 – Member of the Order of the British Empire
- 1991 – Member of the Order of Australia
