= Ivy May Pearce =

Australian aerobatic pilot

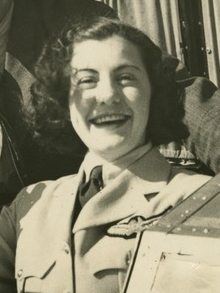
- Occupation: Aircraft pilot, fashion designer

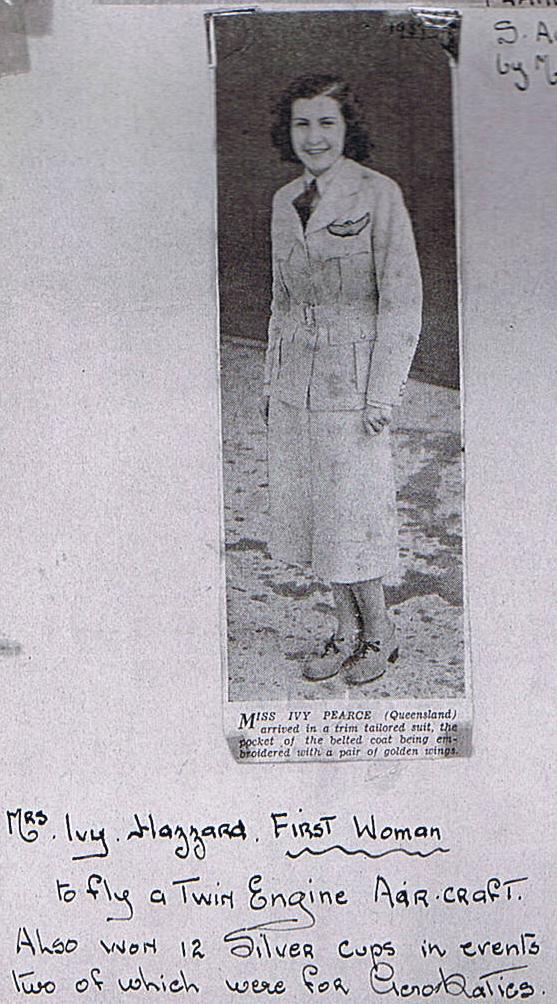

Ivy May Hassard (née Pearce) (10 June 1914 – 26 April 1998) was one of the first female pilots in the southern hemisphere and a pioneer of the Gold Coast, Queensland, Australia. She is noted for her contribution to the cultural development of the Gold Coast, opening the first fashion boutique in Surfers Paradise in 1946.

== Early life ==
Pearce was born in Ipswich, Queensland, on 10 June 1914, Queensland to George and Sarah-Ann (née Johnson) Pearce. She was raised in a succession of hotels. At three years of age, in 1917, she fell ill with a lung condition that almost claimed her life. At six years old her parents decided to send her to Dalby, in the hope that the drier climate might help her recover.

Pearce and her younger sister, Merle, lived in the St Columba's Convent at Dalby, as this was the only place their parents could find for them to stay. At the convent she began piano lessons, at which she excelled. On her return to Brisbane she attended All Hallows Catholic School where she also learnt the cello and the violin. It was here that she also received her piano letters.

== Aviator ==
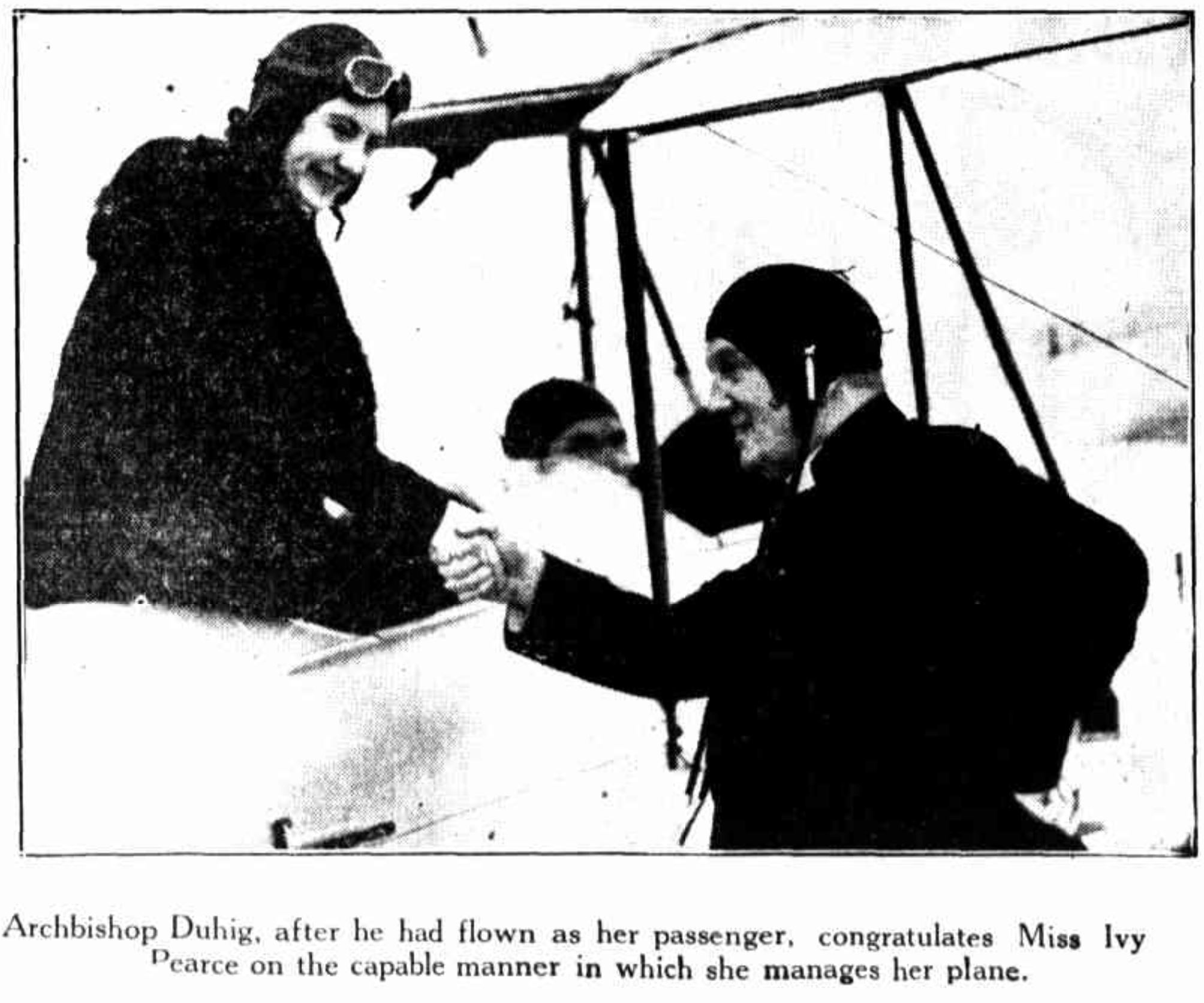
Archbishop Duhig, after he had flown as her passenger, congratulates Miss Ivy Pearce on the capable manner in which she manages her plane, 4 September 1935

Ivy Pearce was among the first cohort of women pilots in the southern hemisphere, and one of the first aerobatic pilots in Australia. After leaving All Hallows, Pearce developed an interest in flying after her father gave her a Tiger Moth plane. In August 1934, at age 16 Ivy had her first flying lesson with Airlines of Australia pilot Captain Ernest Jason Hassard and was flying solo after seven and a half hours of instruction. Ivy spent many afternoons at the aerodrome at Archerfield, flying and studying aviation. Within a year she had completed 30 hours of solo flying and was twisting a Tiger Moth into manoeuvres in the sky. She was soon flying around Surfers Paradise and went on to become one of Australia's first aerobatic pilots, by 18 Ivy had her A-class pilot's licence.

Pearce was an aviator during the 1930s. One of her best friends of that period was Gloria (née Osborne) Pritchett of Bundaberg. Gloria frequently flew with Ivy in a two-seat configured biplane and was a bridesmaid at Ivy's wedding. Gloria resided in Coronado, California until she died in 2008.

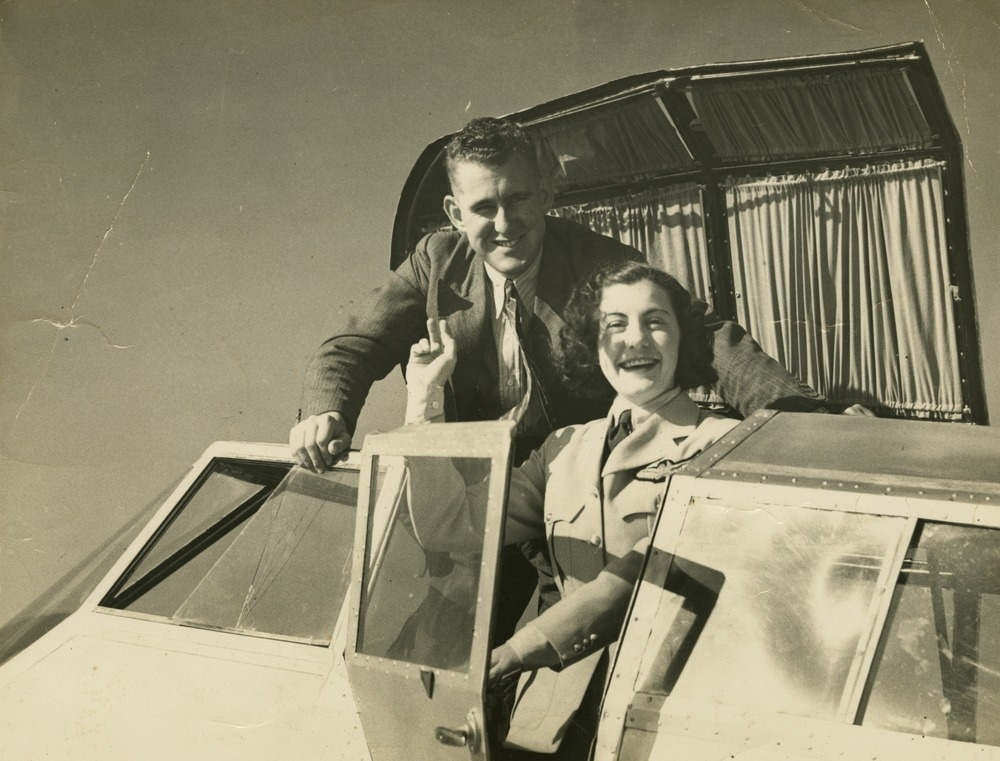
Ivy May Pearce and Jason Hassard before taking off for the Brisbane to Adelaide air race, 1936

In 1934 Pearce was runner up in The Courier-Mail Flying Scholarship behind the winner Harry Poulsen. Pearce "was the only female among five males who scored free lessons and a year's membership to the Aero Club" (Clare Mackenzie, 1993). Due to there being no other female pilots, let alone ones who could do loops in the air and were only 18 years of age, she had trouble finding a willing passenger. Brisbane Catholic Archbishop James Duhig volunteered to be the first passenger on a flight from Brisbane's Archerfield Airport to Ipswich on 4 September 1935. Afterwards Duhig reported that Pearce had handled the plane admirably and that the machine was perfectly steady through the flight with the turns almost imperceptible. Pearce once said "I've never been absolutely sure whether he put his faith in me or the Almighty on that occasion". Her father was her passenger for her second flight.

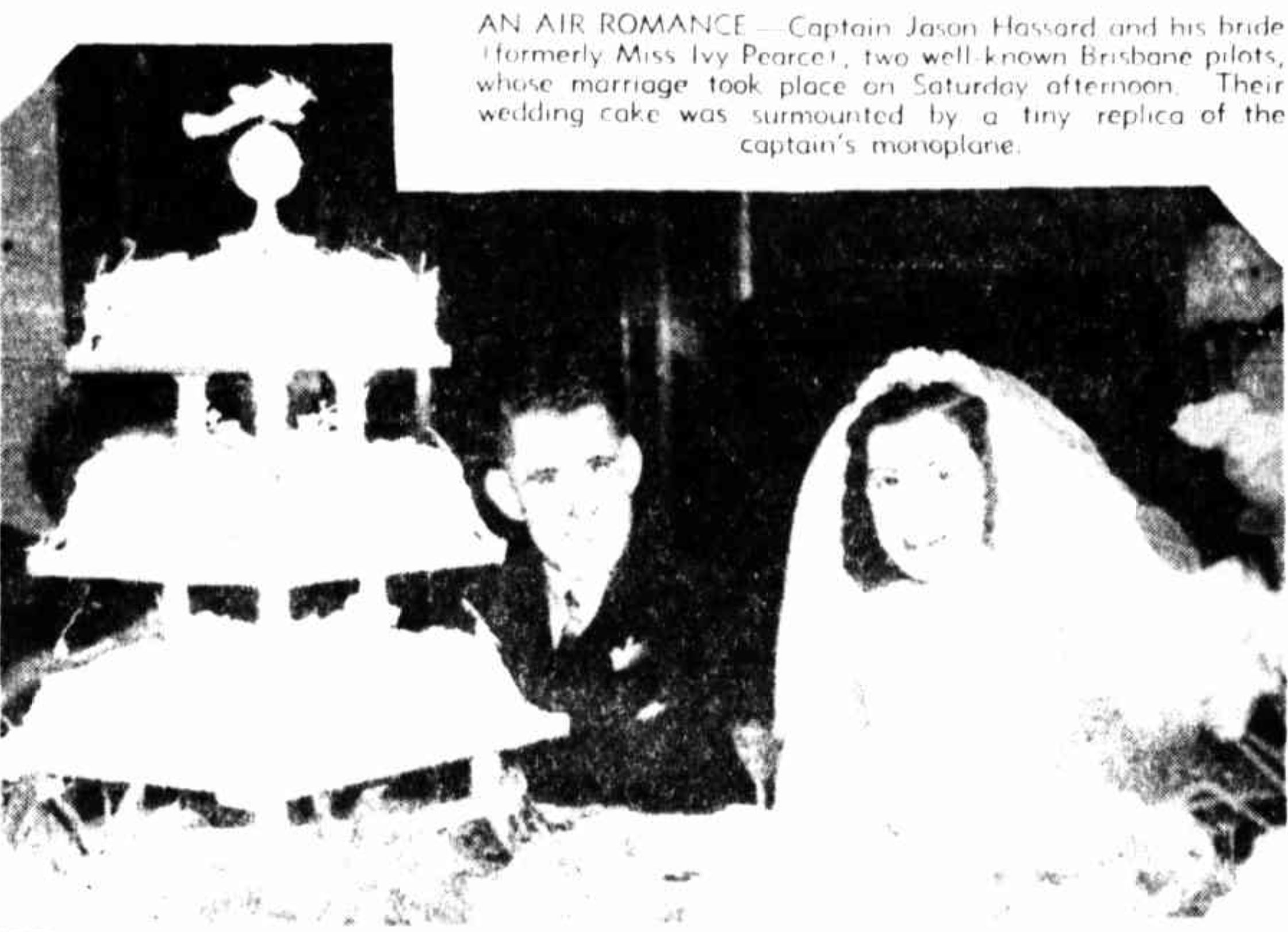
Wedding cake with replica monoplane, 12 June 1937

She competed in the 16 December 1936 Brisbane to Adelaide air race. Pearce made national headlines as the youngest entrant who recorded the fastest time of any woman pilot, heavily handicapped and just two seconds behind the eventual winner. She beat Reg Ansett, founder of Ansett Airlines (Mackenzie (1993)).

Pearce's navigator in the Brisbane to Adelaide race was Ernest Jason Hassard (nephew of aviator Keith Virtue). A few days after the race they announced their engagement. Aged 23, Pearce married Jason Hassard on Saturday 12 June 1937 in St John's Cathedral in Brisbane. Jason Hassard was also a pilot. As the bride and groom left the cathedral, three female pilots flew low in formation over the cathedral. On top of the wedding cake at the reception at Rowes Cafe was a tiny replica of a monoplane being flown by Jason Hassard. Their honeymoon was spent touring New South Wales by car and aeroplane.

== Fashion ==
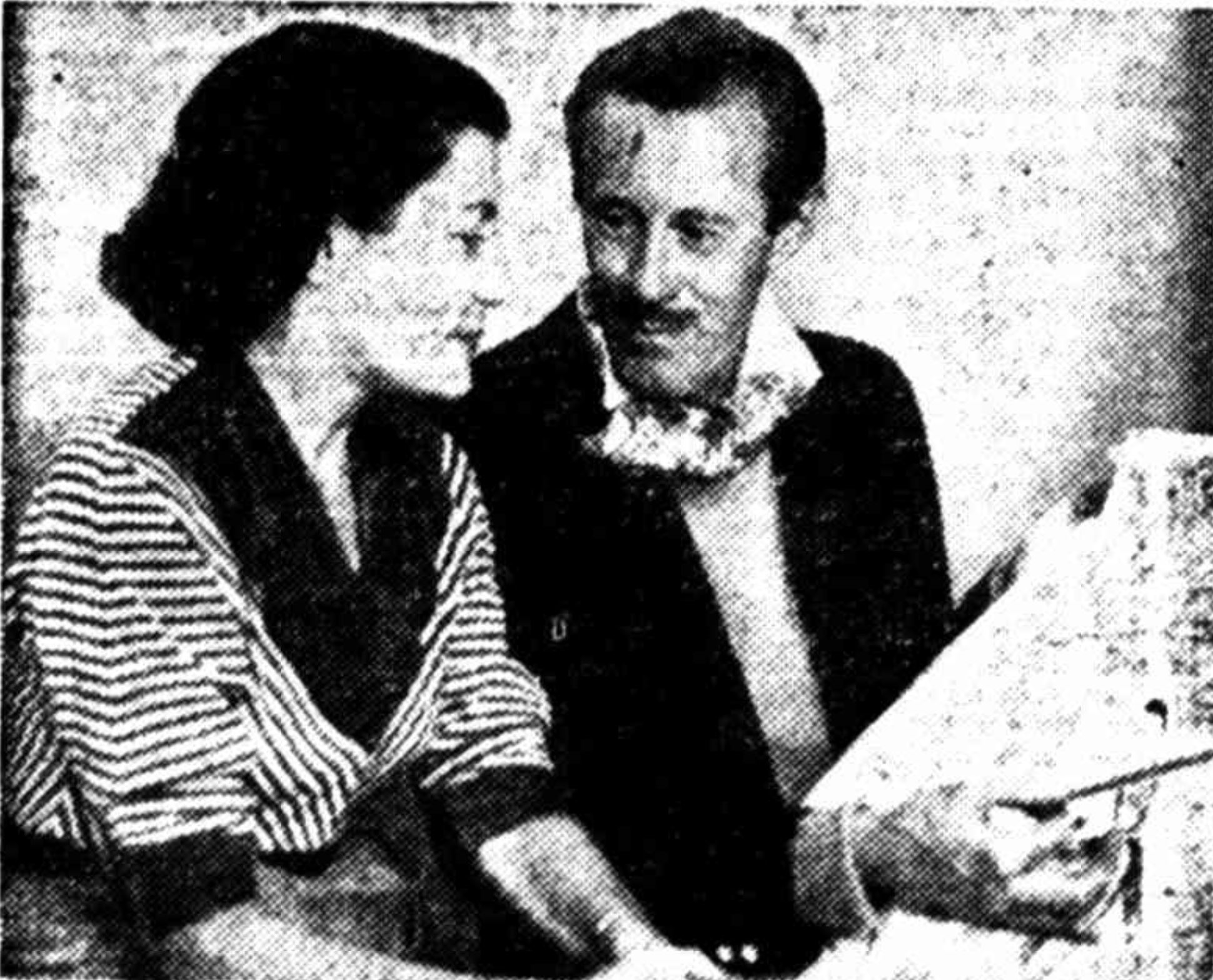
Ivy Hassard and John Dolby, partners in a Gold Coast fashion business, discuss a design, 1954

In 1946 Pearce opened the first fashion boutique on the Gold Coast. She used her own design and later organised fashion parades for the region, being some of the first fashion parades for that area.

In the late 1950s she opened a beauty salon called Jollie Madame, named after her favourite perfume. By this time she had three children. Her marriage to Jason ended in 1950.

A fashion parade in August 1954, featuring the designs of Pearce (now Hassard) and business partner John Dolby, was marred by the discovery that others in the fashion industry in the audience were using spy cameras to photograph the designs.

During the 1960s Pearce opened her third boutique, Ivy Hassard Fashions, which used to be at the ANA hotel site.

== Later life ==
Due to her lung condition, she was not expected to live to child-bearing age. She defied medical authorities and survived to be 84. On 26 April 1998 Ivy Pearce died, the lung condition finally claiming her life, leaving behind three children and numerous grandchildren.

When her ex-husband Jason Hassard retired, he had completed 36,695 flying hours (the 2nd highest in the world).

== Legacy ==
In 1997, a strip of land on the corner of Ferny Avenue and Thomas Drive in Surfers Paradise was named Hassard Place in her honour.

In March 2016, the Gold Coast Airport opened a new commercial building called the Ivy Pearce Building in her honour. In 2020 the State Library of Queensland produced an episode on Ivy's achievements both in flying and fashion for their Dangerous Women Podcast series.
