= Nancy Bird Walton =

Australian pioneering aviator (1915–2009)

Nancy Bird Walton AO, OBE
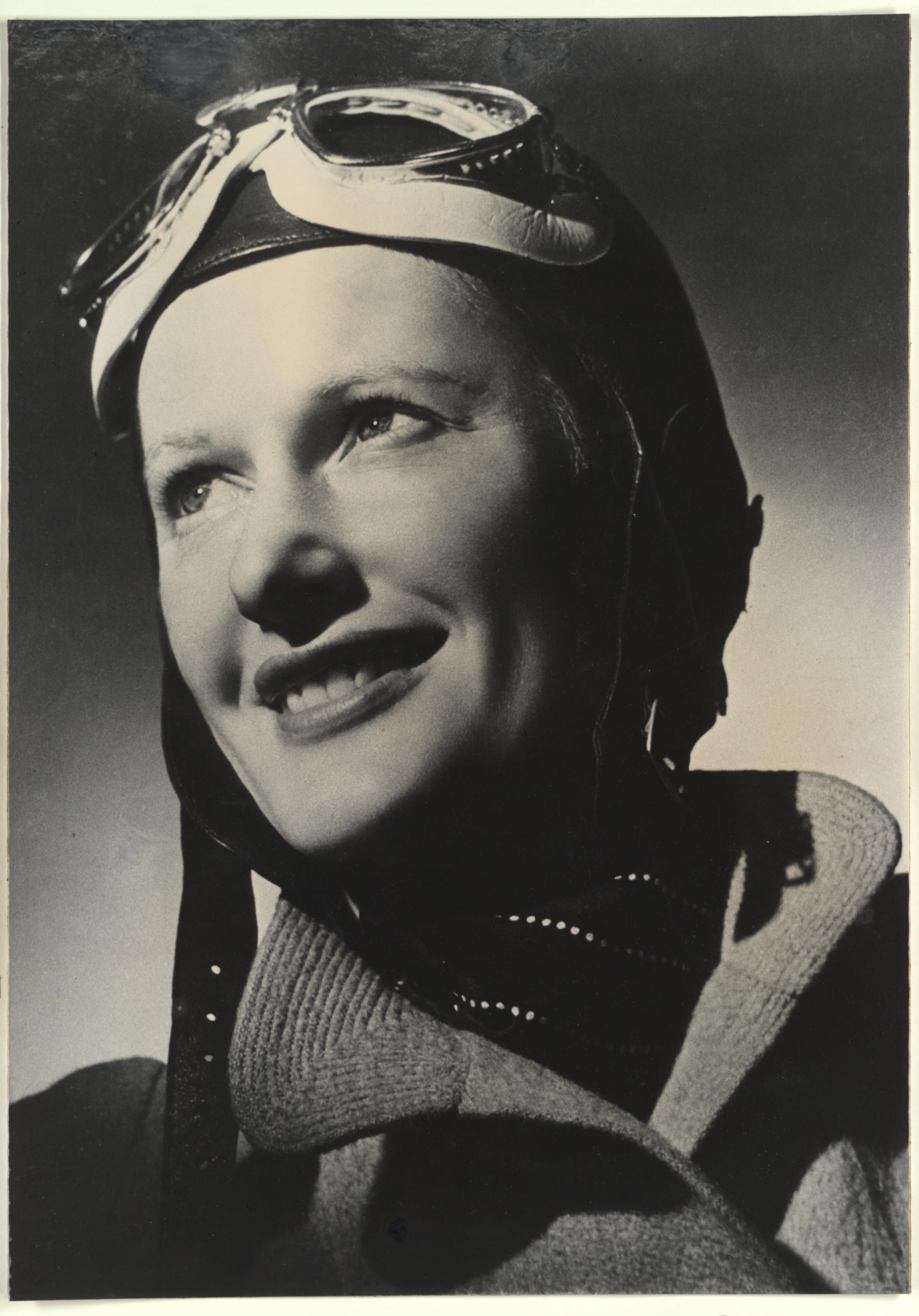
- Portrait by Russell Roberts, c.1930
- Born: Nancy Bird; 16 October 1915; Kew, New South Wales, Australia
- Died: 13 January 2009 (aged 93); Sydney, New South Wales, Australia
- Known for: Youngest woman pilot to gain a Commercial Pilot's Licence in the British Empire
- Spouse: Charles Walton (m. 1939; died 1991)
- Awards: Officer of the Order of Australia (1990); Officer of the Order of the British Empire (1966); Centenary Medal (2001)
- Aviation career
- First flight: 1933
- Flight license: 27 September 1933

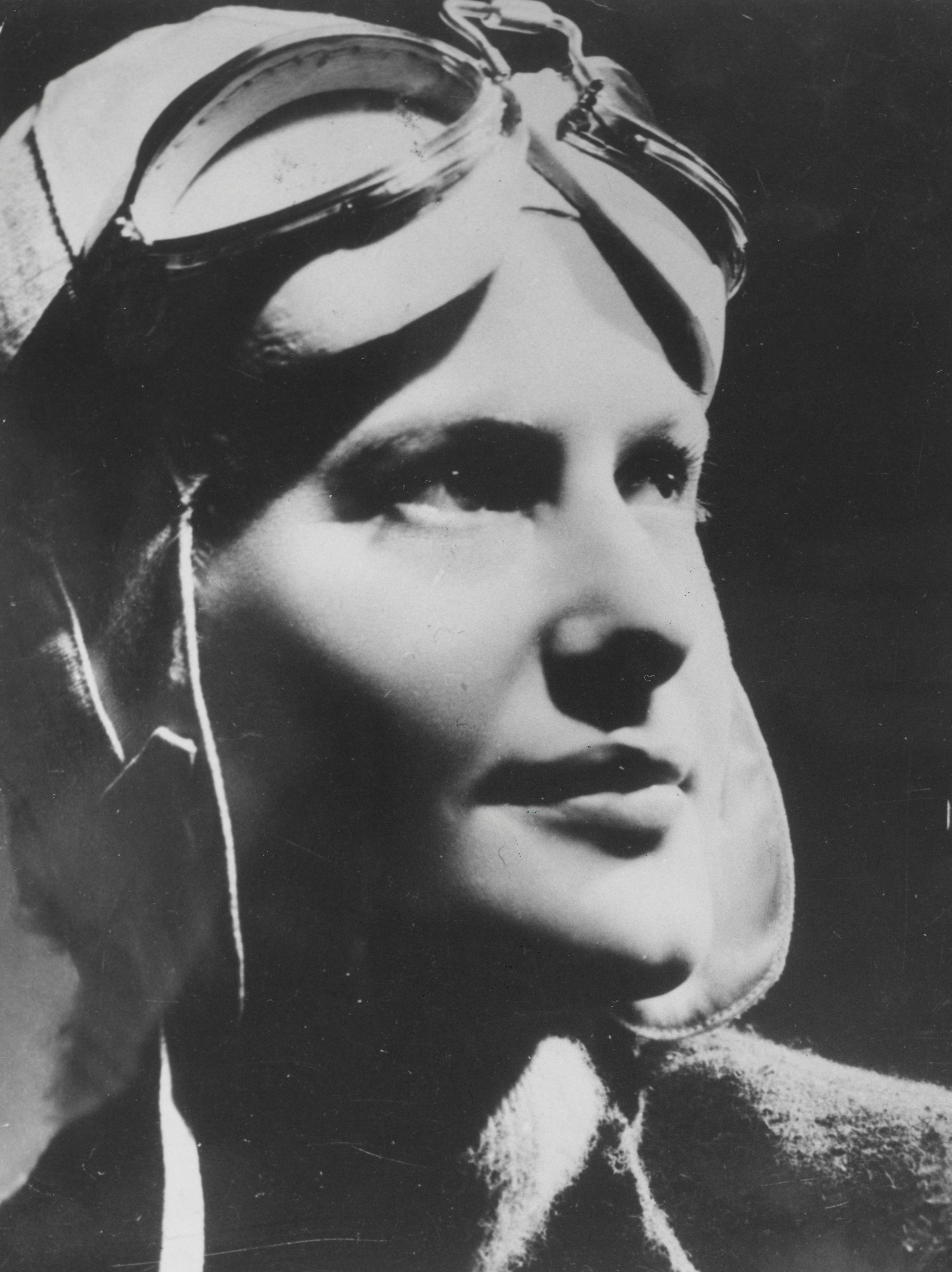
Nancy Bird in London, 1939

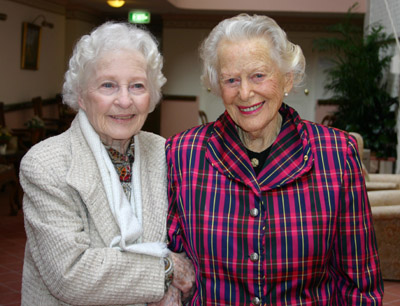
Nancy Bird Walton (right) with another pioneering Australian aviator, Jean Burns (2006).

Nancy Bird Walton (16 October 1915 – 13 January 2009) was a pioneering Australian aviator, known as "The Angel of the Outback", and the founder and patron of the Australian Women Pilots' Association.

In the 1930s, she became a fully qualified pilot at the age of 19 to become the youngest Australian woman to gain a pilot's licence.

== Early life ==
Born in Kew, New South Wales, Australia on 16 October 1915 as Nancy Bird, she was educated at Brighton College, Manly. Bird wanted to fly almost as soon as she could walk. As a teenager during the Depression in Australia, Nancy Bird found herself in the same position as many other children of the time, leaving school at 13 to assist her family. In 1933, at the age of 18, her passion drove her to take flying lessons. Sir Charles Kingsford Smith, who was the first man to fly across the mid-Pacific, had just opened a pilots' school near Sydney, and she was among his first pupils. Most women who learned to fly did so for recreation, but Bird planned to fly for a living, which had never been achieved by a woman before.

== Aviation career ==
When she was awarded a commercial pilot's licence at the age of 19, through a legacy of £A200 from a great aunt, plus money loaned from her father (which she paid back), Bird bought her first aircraft, a de Havilland Gipsy Moth. Soon after, Bird and her friend, Peggy McKillop, took off on a barnstorming tour, dropping in on country fairs and giving joyrides to people who had never seen an aircraft before, let alone a female pilot.

While touring, Bird met Reverend Stanley Drummond. He wanted her to help set up a flying medical service in outback New South Wales. In 1935, she was hired to operate the service, named the Royal Far West Children's Health Scheme. Bird's own Gipsy Moth was used as an air ambulance. She bought a better-equipped aircraft and began covering territory, including Queensland, not yet reached by the Royal Flying Doctor Service of Australia. She told others that it was rewarding but lonely work.

In 1936, Nancy Bird entered an air race from Adelaide to Brisbane, and won the Ladies' Trophy. In 1938, she decided to have a long break from flying. A Dutch airline company (KLM) invited her to do some promotional work in Europe, where she stayed for a couple of years. She returned to Australia soon after World War II broke out. She began training women in skills needed to back up the men flying in the Royal Australian Air Force.

In 1950, she founded the Australian Women Pilots' Association (AWPA), where she remained president for five years. In 1958, she decided to return to flying after a hiatus of over twenty years. Nancy-Bird Walton became Patron of the AWPA in 1983, following the death of Lady Casey, the original Patron. Walton purchased Lady Casey's Cessna 180 which had been named Lady Casey by Baron Casey.

== Recognition and honours ==
Throughout her life, Walton was notable for her support of charities and people in need. As a result, she was invested as an Officer of the Order of the British Empire (OBE) in 1966. She was appointed an Officer of the Order of Australia (AO) in 1990. She was the inspiration for generations of female pilots. She was never involved in an accident, despite the risks of early aviation.

The Nancy-Bird Walton Memorial trophy, sponsored by the family, is presented by the Australian Women Pilots' Association for the "most noteworthy contribution to aviation by a woman of Australasia".

The National Trust of Australia declared her an Australian Living Treasure in 1997, and in 2001 she was inducted into the Victorian Honour Roll of Women.

The first Airbus A380 (VH-OQA) delivered to Australian airline Qantas was named in her honour. Her name on the A380 was originally written "Nancy Bird Walton", but Qantas respected her preference for the hyphenation that her late husband used ("Nancy-Bird"), and the hyphen was added before the aircraft's naming, shortly after she was aboard the ceremonial flight above Sydney. This aircraft was operating flight QF32 when it suffered a serious uncontained engine failure after takeoff from Singapore in 2010; coincidentally, Walton wrote the first officer's reference when he first joined Qantas as a pilot.

One of her last main interviews was for the feature-length documentary film Flying Sheilas which provided an insight into her life along with seven other Australian female pilots.

In March 2019, Prime Minister Scott Morrison announced that the new Western Sydney Airport will be named Western Sydney International (Nancy-Bird Walton) Airport.

A tunnel boring machine used in New South Wales is named after her.

== Personal life ==
She was 24 when she married an Englishman, Charles Walton, and had two children. He preferred to call her "Nancy-Bird" rather than "Nancy", and she became generally known as "Nancy-Bird Walton". Bird also had two children: John and Anne Marie.

On 10 September 2008, shortly before her death, Walton conducted a 45-minute interview for the one-hour documentary.

On 13 January 2009, Nancy Bird Walton died at the age of 93 in Mosman, Sydney.

A collection of Walton's papers are held in the collections of the National Library of Australia.
