= Aéroclub féminin la Stella =

French women's aeronautical club (1909–1926)

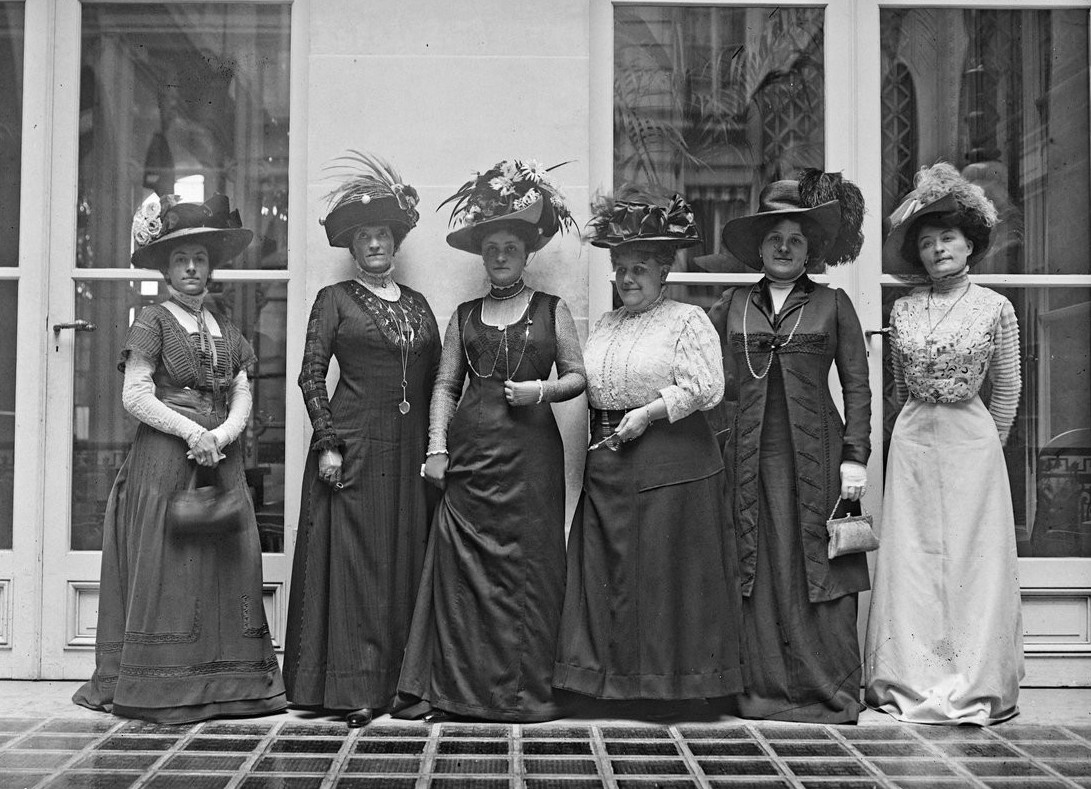
- Committee of La Stella: Madames Savignac, VP (bureau), Desfossés-Dalloz VP, Surcouf (présidente), Vincent VP, Blériot VP, Airault (secrétaire) 1909
- Formation: 10 February 1909; 117 years ago
- Dissolved: 30 June 1926; 100 years ago

The Aéroclub Féminin la Stella was a French women's aeronautical organisation. It was founded on 10 February 1909 in Paris by Marie Surcouf, a French aeronaut and campaigner for women's rights. Known as La Stella, the organisation's membership included many of the women balloonists who had previously been members of the Comité des Dames of l'Aéronautique-Club de France (ACDF). La Stella was founded as a result of a long struggle by French women to be recognised as competent professionals and accomplished sportswomen in the field of flying, initially in balloons. The club offered restricted access to men, who could be members, but not decision-makers. They were allowed to accompany their wives on flights, but only as passengers.

== Background ==
French women were involved in balloon flights from very early in the development of the sport. The Marchioness and Countess of Montalembert, the Countess of Podenas and Miss de Lagarde ascended in a tethered balloon in Paris on 20 May 1784. On 4 June 1784, opera singer Élisabeth Thible made an ascent in an untethered balloon, dressed as Minerva, the Roman goddess, and sang two duets from Monsigny's La Belle Arsène with Mr. Fleurant to entertain Gustav III of Sweden during his visit to Lyon.

In 1798, after the French Revolution, Citoyenne Henri made an ascent with André-Jacques Garnerin, after the dismissal of claims that female internal organs were not strong enough to survive such an experiment unscathed, and that a mixed crew was immoral. Sophie Blanchard was the first woman to pilot her own balloon and undertake ballooning as a career, making her first ascent in a balloon with her husband on 27 December 1804 and eventually dying in a ballooning accident in 1819.

By the start of the French Third Republic (1870 - 1940), ballooning was seen as a sporting, scientific or military activity, rather than a spectacle for the entertainment of crowds. Women were therefore generally excluded from taking part in the sport, although some did manage to participate in events and public demonstrations, such as the actress Léa d'Asco in 1887 and the sportswoman Camille du Gast in 1895, although she used her maiden name to avoid social awkwardness.

The Aéroclub de France, founded in 1898, was no different in their attitude to women flying in balloons, but did launch a Challenge des Femmes Aéronautes (Women Aeronauts' Challenge) in 1902, a distance event in which women were only permitted to be passengers for male pilots. These female passengers were wealthy members of high society. The competition was repeated in 1903 under the same conditions.

In January 1906, the Aéronautique Club de France (ACDF), founded in October 1897, instituted a women's section after much debate. The Comité des Dames was chaired by Madame Marie Surcouf.

Club member Mrs Émile Carton, wife of Jules Émile Carton, who ballooned in the 1901 Olympics, made her first solo ascent on 6 May 1906. Marie Surcouf, who qualified as a pilot on 28 July 1906, made her first flight as a pilot on 23 August of the same year aboard the ‘Bengali’ balloon, accompanied by Miss Gache, the committee's secretary. This balloon flight, the first by a female crew, took the two women from the Parc des Coteaux de Saint-Cloud to Neuilly sur Marne in 2 hours 45 minutes.

Following a dispute with the ACDF Executive Committee, Marie Surcouf resigned as President of the Comité des Dames on 6 April 1908, taking most of the committee's female members with her.

Meanwhile, a new society, the Club Français des Touristes Aériens, was founded on 18 September 1908. This society had its own Ladies' Committee, called the Fémina Club Aéronautique, with Madame Allier as president and Madame Colin as secretary. From 20 September 1908, the head office of this women's club was located at 149 rue Saint-Honoré. However, this women's club seems to have been short-lived.

== Creation of the Aéroclub Féminin la Stella and the rise of women's ballooning ==
Marie Surcouf founded the Aéroclub Féminin la Stella known colloquially as La Stella on 10 February 1909 and took on the role of President.

The members of La Stella's Board of Directors included Madame Alice Blériot, Madame Max-Vincent and former members of the Comité des Dames de l'Aéronautique-Club de France, Madame Airault, Madame Albufeda and Madame Desfossé-Dalloz. On 15 April 1909, La Stella became a member of the Aéro-Club de France, the organisation which set many of the regulations that controlled aviation in France.

The head office of La Stella was initially located at Marie Surcouf's home, 92 bis boulevard Pereire in Paris, before moving successively to 25 rue de Marignan and 86 boulevard Flandrin. From March 1916, the head office was at 6 rue de l'Amiral-Courbet, in the private mansion provided by Mr and Mrs Richefeu, then at 5 rue Chernoviz in 1920, Surcouf's address after her 1916 divorce from Edouard Surcouf.

Men were admitted as members of La Stella but were not allowed any decision-making powers; they could accompany their wives as passengers but not pilot the balloons themselves. "La Stella", declared Marie Surcouf, “is a women's club that allows the fathers, husbands, sons or brothers of its members to accompany them on their air travels”. Fees were set high, with a minimum of 2000 francs for donors, and for participants, a membership fee of 25 francs a year or minimum payment of 400 francs was expected.

La Stella's first balloon ascension is held on a fine day on June 16, 1909 at Saint-Cloud near Paris. Six balloons ascended, all named after flowers, (cornflowers, daisies, roses, peonies, hortensias and carnations) and decorated with the relevant blooms. Surcouf piloted one of the balloons.

The club grew quickly, recruiting women from well heeled backgrounds; socialites the Princess of Polignac, the Countess of Poliakoff and the sporting Duchess of Uzès, and women who moved in political circles such as Madame Gabrielli, wife of Senator Gabrielli and Madame Henriette Poincaré, wife of the French president Raymond Poincaré. The club organised conferences, artistic evenings with opera, tea parties called ‘Stella-Thé’, and started a tradition of annual banquets, such as the one held on 15 February 1912 in the salons of the Palais d'Orsay. In addition to climbing and flying, visits to sites of aeronautical interest such as the Astra hangars, the Villacoublay airfield and the Buc airfield filled the club's social calendar.

La Stella's committee meetings and social events were initially held in the salons of the Hôtel Crillon, but from October 1912, they moved to the Hôtel Astoria, 133 avenue des Champs-Élysées.

On 17 June 1909, Marie Surcouf obtained her aeronaut's licence from the Aéronautique-Club de France, and went on to obtain the first sports pilot's licence awarded to a woman. This licence was common to both men and women and the conditions for obtaining it were defined by the Aéro-Club de France: 10 ascents, including 2 solo flights and one at night. She was followed in August 1910 by Mademoiselle Tissot and Madame Airault. From 1912 onwards, La Stella was recognised as an organisation able to issue aeronaut licences in accordance with the standards of the Fédération Aéronautique Internationale, which had been created in 1905.

By 1911, La Stella had 122 members, 79 of whom were women. In 1911, in addition to the 65 ascents in spherical balloons and the 14 ascents in airships, there were 10 flights in aeroplanes, with the ‘Stelliennes’ as passengers in the latter. Most of the flights took place at Villacoublay, Port-Aviation (often called "Juvisy Airfield"), and Issy-les-Moulineaux. On 17 December 1912, in a speech at la Stella annual banquet at the Palais d'Orsay, Marie Surcouf stated "L'empire des airs appartient à tous, et qui oserait contester que la femme n'a pas le droit à la conquête des étoiles. Ce que l'homme parvient à acquérir par sa force musculaire, par son endurance physique, la femme le conquiert aussi par sa volonté, sa ténacité et son courage. ("The empire of the air belongs to everyone, and who would dare to dispute that women do not have the right to conquer the stars. What men achieve through their muscular strength and physical endurance, women also achieve through their will, tenacity and courage".).

By December 1913, membership in La Stella had grown to 350. At the General Meeting on 17 March 1914, it was stated that La Stella had 6 female aerostat pilots and 7 female aviator pilots: Jeanne Pallier, Carmen Damedoz, Marthe Richer, Hélène de Plagino, Béatrix de Rijk, Marie-Louise Driancourt and Hélène Dutrieu.

La Stella's aeronautical and social activities were suspended in August 1914, with civilian flying curtained by the outbreak of the First World War. The club members, under the impetus of Surcouf, turned their attentions to organising charitiable work for the benefit of military aviation for the duration of the war. However, La Stella did not survive the First World War. In the mid-1920s, Marie Surcouf tried to relaunch the women's flying club, but without much success. Finally, the announcement of the dissolution of the Aéroclub Féminin la Stella was made on 30 June 1926 at the meeting of the Permanent Consultative Commission of Societies affiliated to the Aéro-Club de France.

== Notable members of La Stella ==
- Marie Surcouf, founder of la Stella, aeronaut, licensed as a pilot by the Aéronautique Club de France on 28 July 1906. She made her first flight as a pilot on 23 August 1906 aboard the ‘Bengali’ balloon, accompanied by Mlle Gache, the committee's secretary. It was the first flight by a female crew, and took the two women from Parc des Coteaux de Saint-Cloud to Neuilly-sur-Marne in 2 hours 45 minutes. Surcouf was also the first woman to be awarded a sports aeronaut licence by the Aéro-club de France.
- Marie Goldschmidt, manager of La Stella, qualified as an aeronaut in 1911.
- Marie Marvingt, scholar, famous sportswoman, aeronaut (aeroplane pilot's licence no 145 en 1910) and aviator (aeroplane pilot's licence no 281, 8 November 1910).
- Hélène Dutrieu, Belgian aviator, first Belgian woman pilot (aeroplane pilot's licence no. 27 from l'aéroclub de Belgique, 23 November 1910)
- Jane Herveu, aviator (aeroplane pilot's licence no. 318, 7 December 1910)
- Marie-Louise Driancourt, aviator (aeroplane pilot licence no. 525, 6 June 1911)
- Beatrix de Rijk, Dutch Indonesian aviator, first Dutch woman pilot (aeroplane pilot licence no. 652, 10 October 1911)
- Jeanne Pallier, aviator (aeroplane pilot licence no. 1012, 6 September 1912)
- Marthe Richer, aviator (aeroplane pilot licence no. 1369, 23 June 1913)
- Hélène de Plagino, aviator (aeroplane pilot licence no. 1399, 4 July 1913)
- Carmen Damedoz, aviator (aeroplane pilot licence no. 1449, 5 September 1913)
- Mrs Emile Carton, aeronaut, joined la Stella's board on 6 May 1906
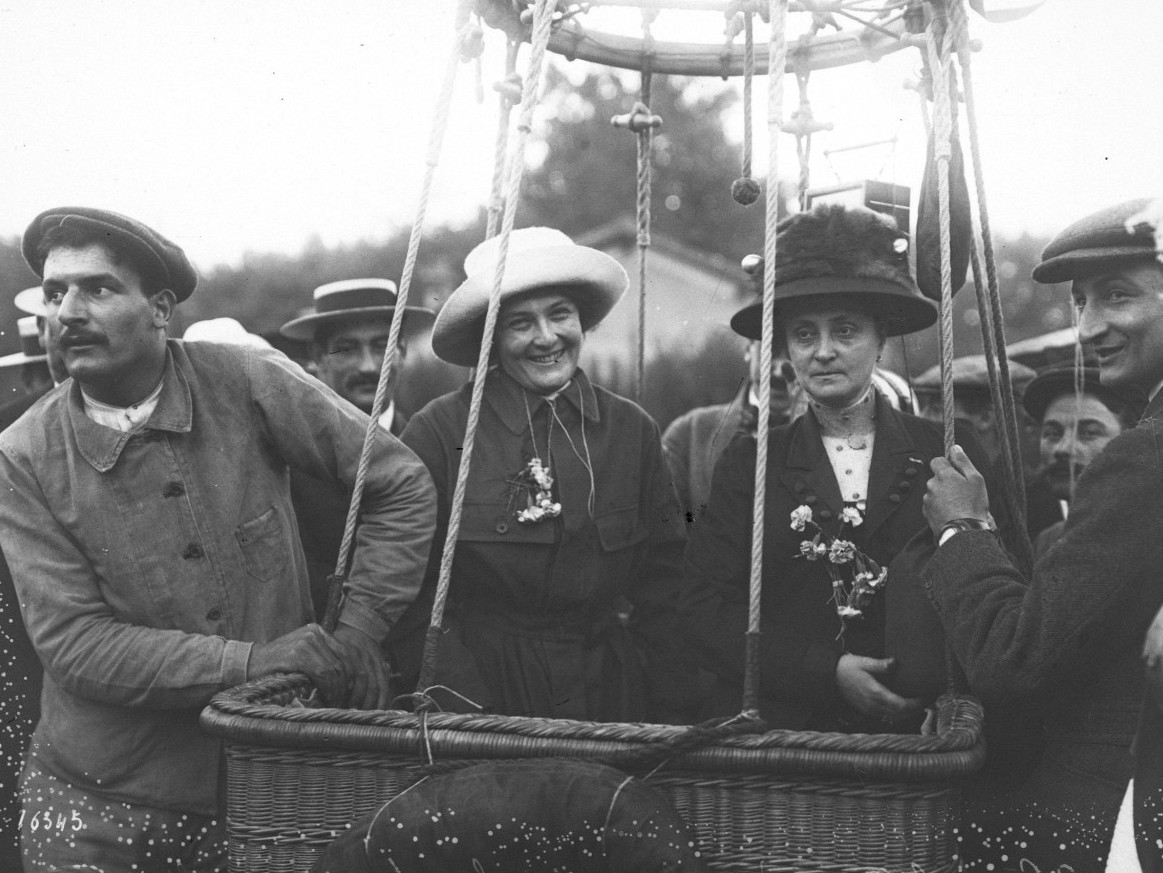
Marie Goldschmidt (left) and Marie Surcouf

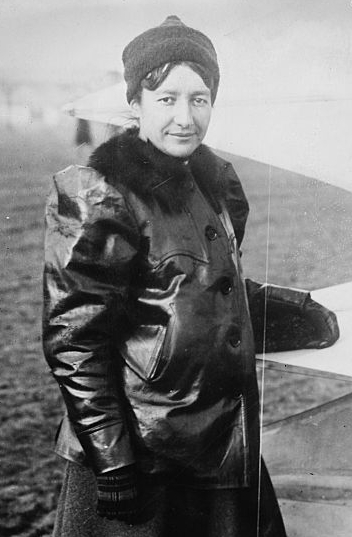
Marie Marvingt

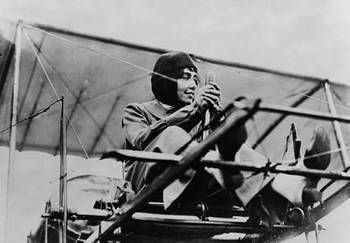
Hélène Dutrieu

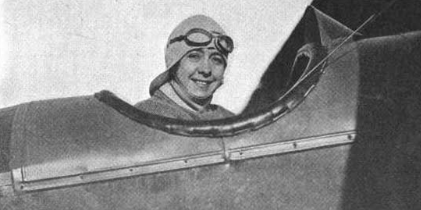
Jane Herveu in 1921

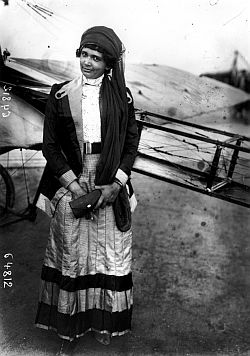
Beatrix de Rijk

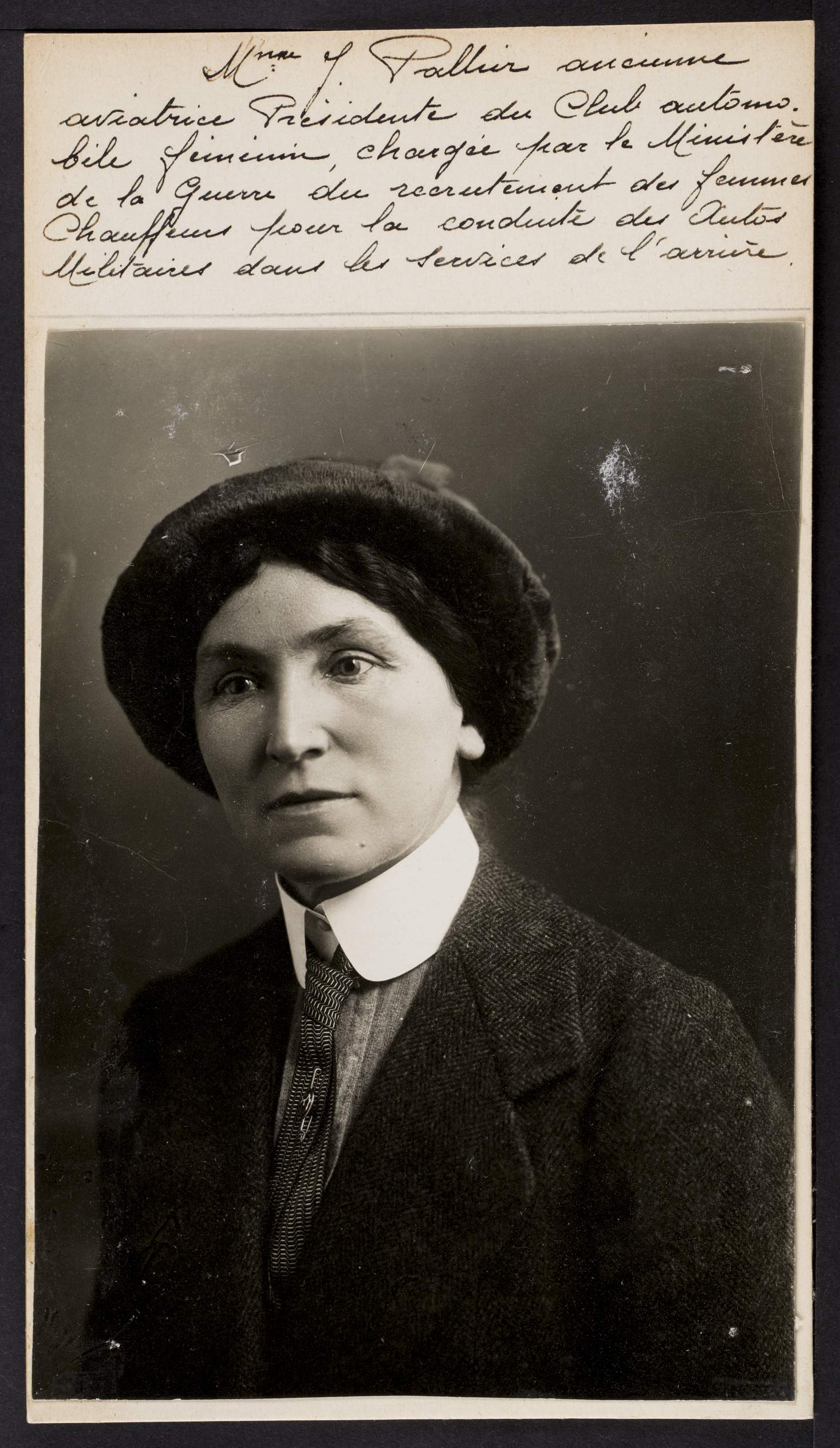
Jeanne Pallier

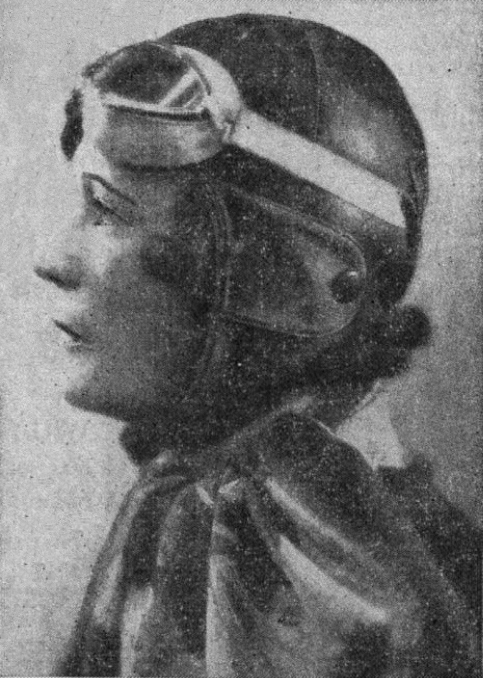
Marthe Richard

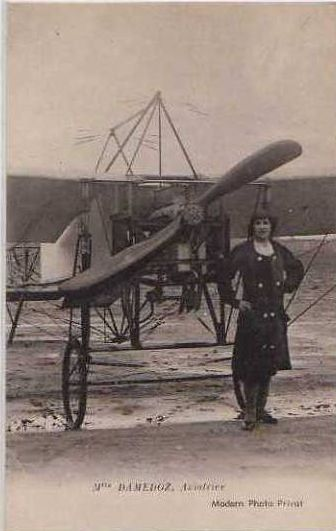
Carmen Damedoz

== L'Union patriotique des aviatrices françaises ==
In 1914, several of la Stella's female aviators formed the Union patriotique des aviatrices françaises (The Patriotic Union of French Women Aviators).

== See also ==
- Automobile Club féminin de France

== Bibliography ==
- Guillaume de Syon, “Engines of Emancipation? Women’s Flying Clubs before World War II”, in "Die Schwestern des Ikarus: Frau und Flug, B. Waibel and H. Vogel (dir.), Marburg, Allemagne: Jonas Verlag, 2004. Disponible sur https://albright.academia.edu/GuillaumedeSyon
- Luc Robène, L'homme à la conquête de l'air, vol 2, Paris, L'Harmattan, 1998
- L'Aéronautique, revue de l'Aéronautique-Club de France (1902-1908), archives of l'Aéronautique-Club de France (ACDF), aérodrome de Meaux-Esbly, 77450 Isles-lès-Villenoy
- Registres des comptes-rendus du Comité des Dames, archives of l'Aéronautique-Club de France, aérodrome de Meaux-Esbly, 77450 Isles-lès-Villenoy
- L'Aéronautique-Club de France (ACDF), centre for aeronautical instruction founded in 1897, Meaux-Esbly aerodrome, 77450 Isles-lès-Villenoy
- " Luc Robène, Le mouvement aéronautique et sportif féminin à la Belle Époque: l’example de La Stella (1909–1914)", in: Lebecq, Pierre-Alban (2004). Sports, éducation physique et mouvements affinitaires au XXe siècle. Paris: Harmattan. pp. 219–233. ISBN 2-7475-5974-2.
- "Luc Robène, Vers la création d’un sport féminin: des filles de l’air aux aéronautes", in: Arnaud, Pierre; Thierry Terret (1996). Histoire du sport féminin (in French). Paris: L'Harmattan. pp. 165–184. ISBN 2-7384-4296-X.
- Robineau, Lucien (2005). Les Français du ciel (in French). Paris: Cherche midi. p. 782. ISBN 2-7491-0415-7.
- Marck, Bernard (1993). Les aviatrices (in French). Paris: L'Archipel. p. 387. ISBN 978-2-909241-26-5.
- http://www.fondett-ailes.fr/images/femmes%20pilotes.pdf
