= Cheridah de Beauvoir Stocks =

British aviator

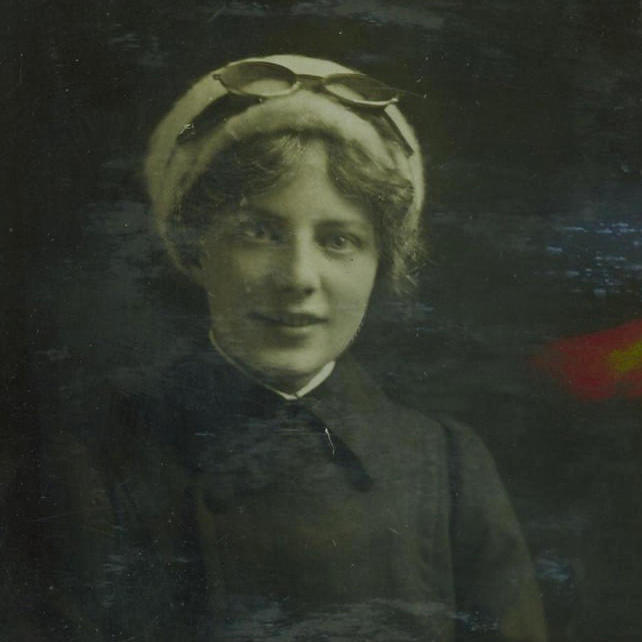
- aviator
- Born: 6 November 1887; Westcombe, Somerset, England
- Died: 1 May 1971 (aged 83); Northampton, Northamptonshire, England
- Other names: Cheridah Annie Ernst
- Known for: Pioneer women aviator

Cheridah de Beauvoir Stocks (1887–1971) was the second British woman to gain a Royal Aero Club aviator's licence, in 1911. She was partially paralysed following an aviation accident in 1913.

== Early life ==
Cheridah was born Cheridah Annie Ernst on 6 November 1887 in Evercreech, Somerset, England, the daughter of Henry Ernst, a magistrate, and his wife Annie (née Waring). In the 1901 Census Cheridah was living at the Hotel Metropole on Northumberland Avenue, Strand, London with her sister Bessie and her widowed mother.

She married David de Beauvoir Stocks in London in 1909.

== Flying ==
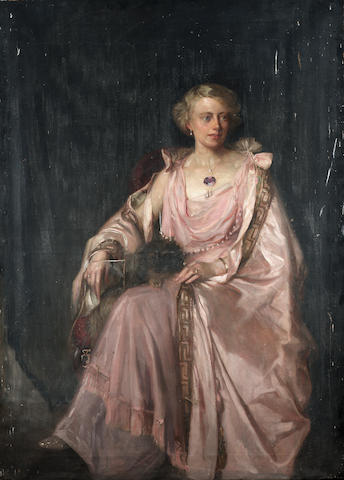
Cheridah de Beauvoir Stocks by John William Schofield

The new Mrs De Beauvoir Stocks trained at the Grahame-White flying school at Hendon. On 7 November 1911 she became only the second woman to gain a Royal Aero Club aviators certificate, passing her test using a Farman biplane at Hendon just three months after Hilda Hewlett became the first woman to earn the certificate. Grahame-White had trained several women and he had formed the Women's Aerial League in 1909. The membership of this league included test pilot Mrs Winifred Buller, Lady Anne Savile and Eleanor Trehawke Davies, Emmeline and Cristabel Pankhurst.

By 1912 she had moved from the Farman to a Bleriot plane which had a 35 horse power Anzani engine. She would be cheered at meeting at the Hendon airfield with what was described as a "finished performance". In July she was the only pilot at Hendon on their Women's Aerial League Lady's Day. The original plans had included Hilda Hewlett, Hélène Dutrieu and Jane Herveu but on the day she was alone. Later that year, her portrait, Mrs. Cheridah de Beauvoir Stocks, painted by John William Schofield was exhibited at the RBA, Autumn Exhibition.

Following an air crash during an airshow at Hendon in 1913, in which she was the passenger of Sydney Pickles. She was taken to Central London Sick Asylum. She was unconscious for six weeks and her recovery was closely followed by the newspapers of the day. Stocks was paralysed down her right side and never flew again.

== Later life ==
Her husband David, a Commander in the Royal Navy, died on 31 January 1918 when the submarine HMS K4 was lost in an accident.

Stocks went on to study at Oxford in the 1920s and gained a BSc in Social Anthropology. She died on 1 May 1971 in Northampton aged 83.
