= Jeanne Pallier =

French aviator

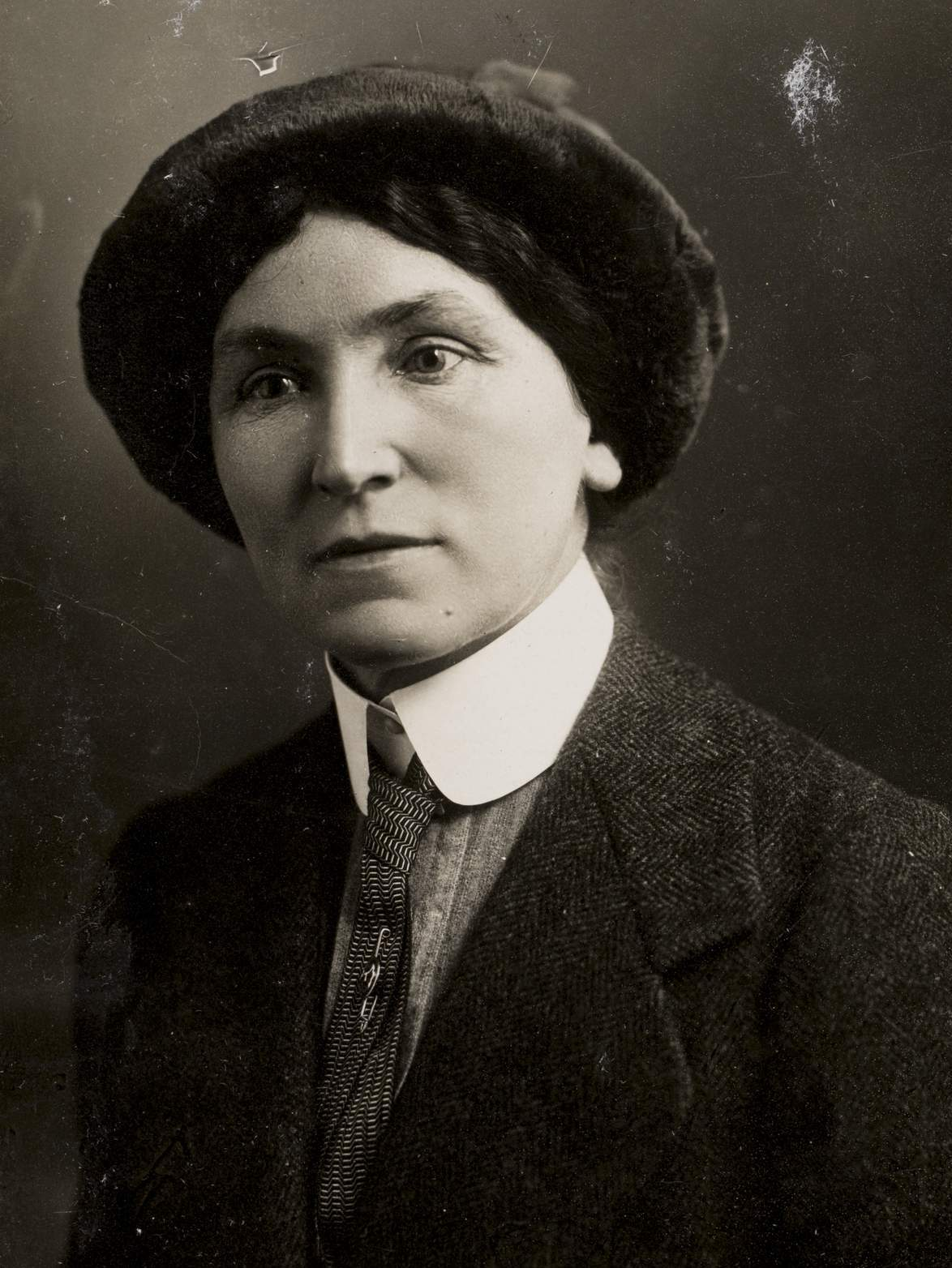
- Born: 1863 or 1864
- Died: 6 March 1939; Villeneuve-sur-Yonne
- Known for: Pioneering French pilot

Jeanne Pallier (1863 or 1864 – 6 March 1939), was a pioneering French aviator before the First World War, qualifying for her pilot's licence in 1912. Founder of le Club Féminine Automobile to provide female drivers for the ambulances near the Front in the First World War.

== Early life ==
Jeanne Pallier is thought to have been born in either 1863 or 1864. Little is known of her life before she took up flying.

== Pilots license ==
Madame Jeanne Pallier earned her Brevet de pilote d'aéroplane (French pilot's license), No. 1012, on 6 September 1912, at the age of forty eight, making her the oldest French female aviator at the time. Requirements by the Aéroclub de France, the awarding body, included ten ascents, including two unaccompanied flights and one undertaken at night. Pallier had passed her flying test on 2 August, by flying over Paris at an altitude of 700m, something of a feat at the time and she was admired by observers for her audacity. She had trained on an Astra CM biplane, a Concours Militaire three-seater of considerable size and weight even though she made her qualifying flight, and her later solo flights in smaller aircraft, Astra and Astra-Nieuport biplanes, then in 1914 in a Nieuport monoplane.

== Flying career ==
Pallier became a member of the Aéroclub féminin la Stella, a women's flying club set up by Marie Surcouf in 1909. Pallier made several flights above the countryside south-west of Paris: between Villacoublay and Chartres, over the forest of Rambouillet. She flew with a passenger, Madame Duchange, Secretary of la Stella, and for some time it was thought she had been first female pilot to carry a passenger, until she heard of Hélène Dutrieu's flight with her mechanic in Belgium in 1910.

Pallier took part in the Vienna airshow held at the Aspern airfield in June 1913, where she won the women's altitude contest. She and Hungarian pilot Lilly Steinschneider were the only women to fly at the event.

In 1913, Pallier took part in the Coupe Femina women's air race and made a 290 km long flight to Mourmelon in an Astra-Nieuport biplane.

She returned to take part in the Vienna airshow the following year in June 1914 where she won third place in the endurance competition. This was one of the final civilian air events before the outbreak of the First World War.

== First World War ==
At the start of the First World War, civilian flying in Europe came to a halt. Women were not accepted as combatants in the French army, and Jeanne Pallier, like other women including Beatrix de Rijk, was refused the right to offer their services as pilots. Inspired by what was happening in Britain, in 1915 she and Marguerite Durand set up le Club Féminine Automobile to provide female drivers for the ambulances near the Front, but her services were again refused. It was not until 1917 that the French government agreed to allow women to carry out this task on a voluntary basis. le Club Féminine Automobile's one hundred and twenty ambulance drivers and seventy nurses transported wounded soldiers repatriated from battlefields at the Front to hospitals.

== Post war ==
After the end of the First World War, Jeanne Pallier devoted herself to social work at the Renault factory. She created the Coupe Jeanne Pallier (Jeanne Pallier Cup) to encourage young women to take up competitive sport.

She spent the end of her life at the Convent des perpétuels-secours in Villeneuve-sur-Yonne, where her daughter was a nun, and died there on 6 March 1939.
