= Marthe Richard (film) =

1937 film directed by Raymond Bernard

- Directed by: Raymond Bernard
- Written by: Georges Ladoux; Bernard Zimmer
- Produced by: Raymond Hakim; Robert Hakim
- Starring: Edwige Feuillère; Erich von Stroheim; Marcel Dalio
- Cinematography: Charles Bauer; Robert Lefebvre
- Edited by: Charlotte Guilbert
- Music by: Arthur Honegger
- Production company: Paris Film
- Distributed by: Pathé Consortium Cinéma
- Release date: 20 April 1937
- Running time: 95 minutes
- Country: France
- Language: French

Marthe Richard (French: Marthe Richard au service de la France) is a 1937 French war spy film directed by Raymond Bernard and starring Edwige Feuillère, Erich von Stroheim and Marcel Dalio. It was shot at the Joinville Studios in Paris. The film's sets were designed by the art director Jean Perrier. It is based on the story of the French First World War spy Marthe Richard. It enjoyed great commercial success in France and was one of the most popular spy films of the decade.

== Synopsis ==
In Alsace at the beginning of the First World War, Marthe Richard's parents are executed by the German forces. Swearing revenge, she goes to Paris to join the French secret service. She is sent to neutral Spain to seduce the German spy Baron Erich von Ludow and steal secret plans from him, to the displeasure of his current mistress Mata Hari.

== Cast ==
- Edwige Feuillère as Marthe Richard
- Erich von Stroheim as Le baron Erich von Ludow
- Délia Col as Mata-Hari
- Marcel Dalio as Pedro
- Marthe Mellot as Madame Richard, la mère de Marthe
- Liliane Lesaffre as La tenancière
- Jean Galland as von Falken
- Marcel André as Le commandant Rémont
- René Bergeron as L'agent français déguisé en prêtre
- Fernand Bercher as André, le fiancé de Marthe
- Christian Argentin as Un amiral
- Georges Saillard as Un général
- Pierre Juvenet as Un parlementaire
- Jacques Berlioz as Le président de la cour martiale
- Jean Joffre as Charles Richard, le père de Marthe
- Lucien Blondeau as Le chef du deuxième bureau allemand
- Jacques Henley as Le conseiller de l'Empereur
- Ernest Ferny as Le commandant du sous-marin
- Noël Roquevert as Un officier de marine

== Bibliography ==
- Bessy, Maurice & Chirat, Raymond. Histoire du cinéma français: 1935-1939. Pygmalion, 1986.
- Crisp, Colin. French Cinema—A Critical Filmography: Volume 1, 1929–1939. Indiana University Press, 2015.
- Lennig, Arthur. Stroheim. University Press of Kentucky, 2004.
- Rège, Philippe. Encyclopedia of French Film Directors, Volume 1. Scarecrow Press, 2009.
