= ACDF =

ACDF may refer to:

- Anterior cervical discectomy and fusion, a common surgical procedure
- Archive of the Congregation for the Doctrine of the Faith, the Catholic Church's documents dealing with doctrinal and theological issues related to church teaching
- Aeronautique Club de France, a French flying club based on Meaux-Esbly airfield, France, and created in 1897
- Uzbekistan Art and Culture Development Foundation, a state‑backed cultural organisation in the Republic of Uzbekistan
