= Édouard Surcouf =

French engineer

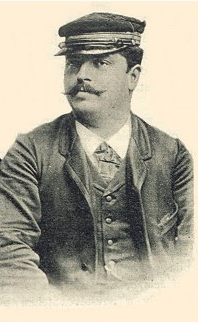
Édouard Surcouf, detail from a photograph taken in Prague in 1891

Édouard Surcouf (1862–1938) was a French engineer, maker and pilot of dirigibles, and industrialist.

== Biography ==
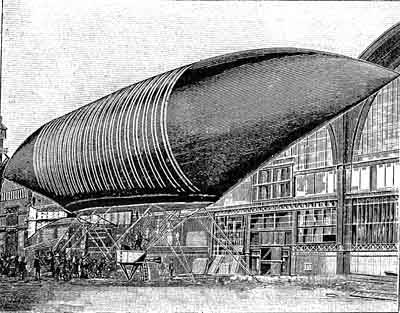
The dirgible Lebaudy.

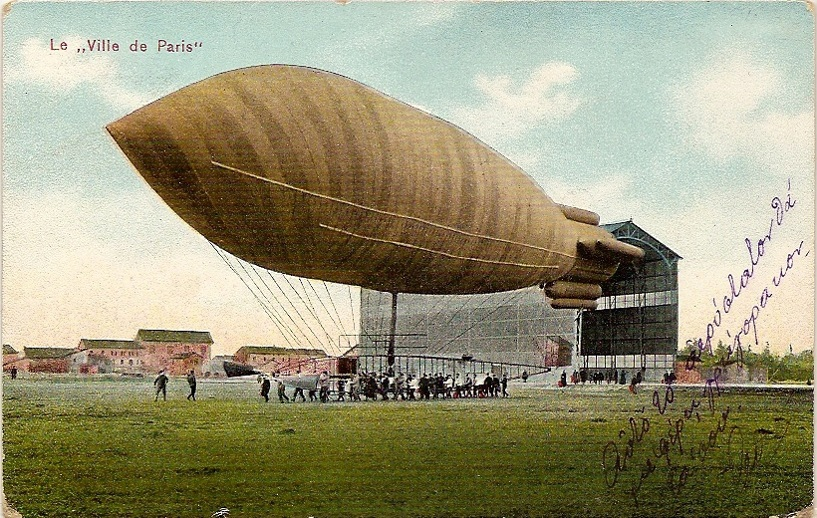
The Ville de Paris in 1906.

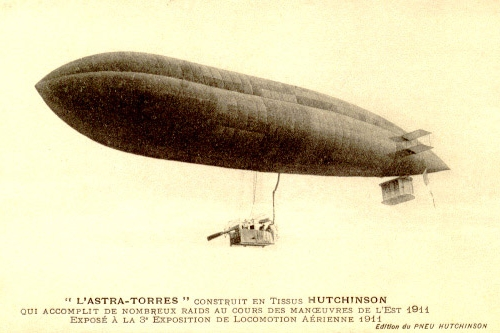
The Astra-Torres dirigible No. 1 from 1911.

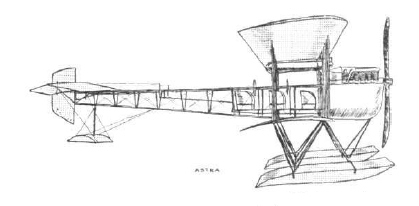
Astra CM biplane

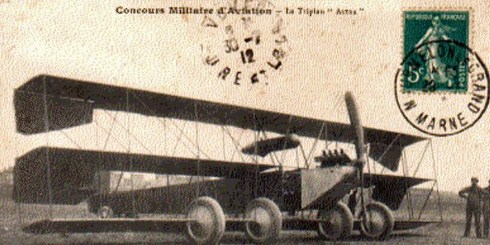
Astra triplane, participant at the military concours d'aviation, 1911

Édouard Surcouf, an aeronautics enthusiast from an early age, made his first flight in a hot-air balloon in 1879 at the age of 17.

The following year, 1880, he started as an apprentice at the "Grands Ateliers Aérostatiques du Champ-de-Mars", the biggest aeronautic manufacturer at the end of the 19th century. He collaborated with engineers Eugène Godard, his brother Louis Godard and Gabriel Yon.

In 1889 he was named president of the School of Aeronautics. With Gabriel Yon he published a reference work, Aérostats et aérostation militaire à l'Exposition universelle de 1889 (éditions Bernard et Cie., Paris, 1889). Surcouf married Marie Surcouf who became the first French woman to gain her sporting pilot's license. She later set up Aéroclub féminin la Stella, a women's ballooning organisation.

In 1889 he became the successor to his godfather (see Urania, a balloon made by the Ateliers Surcouf, Crystal Palace 1889) (Note: Urania, a balloon made by the Ateliers Surcouf - See the aerial acrobat Leona Dare, flying beneath a balloon in 1887 at the Crystal Palace, London. See Leona Dare) This new company would be a pioneer in the introduction of rubberised fabric for the construction of envelopes of dirigibles. He continued Gabriel Yon's enterprise in providing equipment for the Spanish Army.

On 27 July 1900 he was appointed Technical Instructor at the first Swiss military aérostiers training school in Geneva.

In 1902 Surcouf built his first dirigible, Lebaudy I, for the brothers Paul and Pierre Lebaudy (see fr:famille Lebaudy), designed by fr:Henri Julliot and nicknamed "le Jaune" ('Yellow'). The fr:Le Lebaudy (dirigeable) was a hydrogen-filled, cigar-shaped airship pointed or thinning at the sides, 57 metres (187 ft) long, powered by a 40 horsepower (30 kW) engine with a propellers on each side. In 1904 the industrialist Henry Deutsch de la Meurthe ordered the dirigible Le Ville de Paris, which had a bad accident during its inaugural flight in December 1904. It was rebuilt, and Le Ville de Paris flew again in 1906.

Henry Deutsch de la Meurthe joined with Surcouf in 1908 to found the Société Astra (Société Astra de constructions aéronautiques). This new company increased production, making Wright brothers aircraft under licence and their own models such as the CM. The firm also made dirigibles, notably at Meaux and at the industrial site of Boulogne-Billancourt. Surcouf surrounded himself with aeronautical engineers, among which fr:Henry Kapférer would become the administrator of this new industrial firm. New dirigibles appeared:

1909
Ville de Nancy (Astra III)
Clément Bayard (Astra IV)
Colonel Renard (Astra V)
l'Espagne (España) (Astra VI)
Ville de Pau-Ville de Lucerne (Astra VII)

Frédéric Airault, technical director of Compagnie générale transaérienne (later Air France), was associated with Astra from 1909. He skilfully avoided a disaster while flying in l'Espagne (VI), and piloted Ville de Lucerne (VII) on commercial flights in Switzerland in 1910 as Transaérienne's chief pilot.

1910
Ville de Bruxelles (Astra VIII)
Ville de Pau (Astra IX)
Lieutenant Chaura (Astra X)
Adjudant Réau (Astra XI) - made a record-breaking round flight of 850 km from Paris to the German border and back, piloted by Surcouf.
Éclaireur Conté (Astra XII),
(Astra XIII)

On 6 July 1911 Surcouf inaugurated the l'Institut aérotechnique de Saint-Cyr, affiliated with the University of Paris. De la Meurthe bought the Société Générale d'Aéro-Locomotion Deplante-Nieuport when Édouard N. died in 1911, renaming it the Société Anonyme des Établissements Nieuport.

From 1911 Surcouf collaborated with the Spanish engineer Leonardo Torres Quevedo on a new non-rigid dirigible in the Issy-les-Moulineaux works. Their Astra-Torres airship was much faster with better performance than previous airships. Other Astra-Torres dirigibles followed, including the Pilâtre de Rozier (Astra-Torres XV) named after the aerostier Jean-François Pilâtre de Rozier, which at 23,000 m3 was the same size as a Zeppelin.

On 18/19 September 1911 Surcouf piloted the Adjutant Reau (Astra XI) on a record-breaking non-stop round flight of 850 km from Paris (Issy-les-Moulineaux) - Chalons - Verdun - Nancy (Meurthe-et-Moselle) -Epinal - Versoul - Troyes -Paris.

During World War I Surcouf's firms supplied war material.

After the Great War, the company continued to produce dirigibles. In 1919 Henri de la Meurthe died. The Astra company merged with Nieuport to form Astra-Nieuport. In 1923 he retired from the company in favour of Gustave Delage.

== Partial list of publications ==
- Aérostats et aérostation militaire. Marine et arts militaires, Paris, Bernard et compagnie, 1889 (with Gabriel Yon) — Extrait de la « Revue technique de l'Exposition universelle de 1889 »
- L'aéronautique militaire, 1910
- Les aéroplanes marins (hydroaéroplanes), 1913
