= Marthe Richard =

French politician, prostitute and spy (1889–1982)

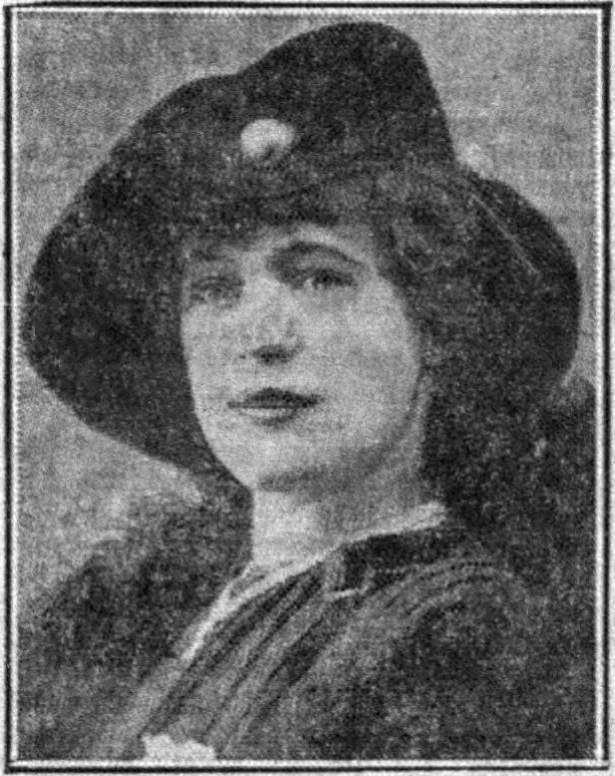
- Marthe Richard in 1915
- Born: Marthe Betenfeld; 15 August 1889; Blâmont, France
- Died: 9 February 1982 (aged 92)
- Occupations: Prostitute, spy, politician
- Notable work: Loi Marthe Richard
- Spouse(s): Henry Richer (d.1916), Thomas Crompton (m. 1926)

Marthe Richard (Note: An adaptation of her first husband, Henri Richer) (née Betenfeld; 15 August 1889 in Blâmont – 9 February 1982) was a French prostitute and spy. She later became a politician, and worked towards the closing of brothels in France in 1946.

== Early life ==
In Nancy, she became an apprentice to a tailor at fourteen, but later was registered as a prostitute in 1905. After a soldier accused her of giving him syphilis, she was forced to leave for Paris, where she met, in 1907, and later wed, Henry Richer. He was a rich industrialist who worked at Les Halles.

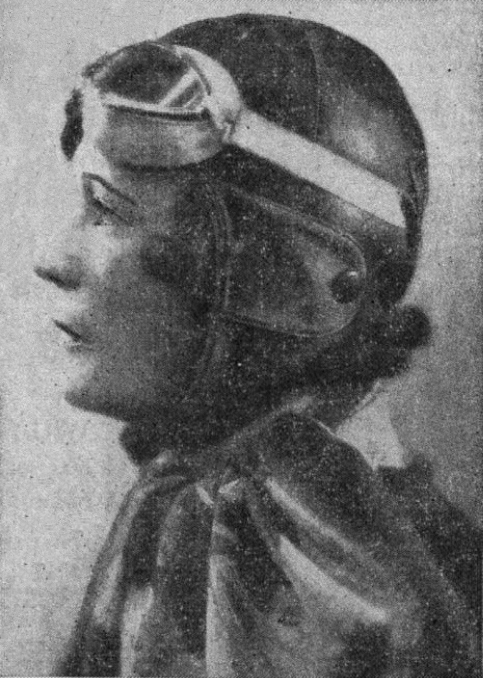
Marthe Richard aviator

In 1912, her husband bought himself a plane, and she flew it for the first time in 1913. She claimed in the press at the time to have broken the female record for the Le Crotoy–Zurich trip. She actually only flew the plane to Burgundy, whence it was shipped by train to the Zurich countryside, and flew it into Zurich. However, the new record was approved. Richard joined the Aéroclub féminin la Stella, a women's flying club set up by Marie Surcouf in 1909. In 1914, she participated in the founding of L'Union patriotique des aviatrices françaises ("Patriotic Union of French Women Aviators"). As Secretary of the Union patriotique des aviatrices de France, alongside Carmen Damedoz, its treasurer, she demanded the right to contribute to the war effort as an aviator, although this was refused by the authorities.

== Espionage ==
Her husband died in World War I in 1916. She became a spy under Captain Georges Ladoux, thanks to her lover, a young Russian anarchist. As part of her duties, she became the mistress of von Krohn, the Naval Attaché of the German Navy in Madrid. On their return to France, she discovered that Captain Ladoux was a double agent, and he was placed under arrest.

She married Thomas Crompton in 1926. He was the financial director for the Rockefeller Foundation, and patron of the restoration of the Petit Trianon. When he died unexpectedly in 1928 in Geneva, she moved to Bougival, and lived very well.

After being released from prison, and restored to the post of commander, Captain Ladoux published his fictionalized Memoires in 1930.

The volume about Richard, Marthe Richard, spy in the French service, was mostly an invention. She claimed half of the vast royalties, and accepted the advice to write her own memoirs. Under the pseudonym of "Richard", she published the best-seller, My life as a spy in the French service (adapted as a film in 1937), and instantly became a heroine of France. Under media pressure, her lover Édouard Herriot, French Prime Minister at the time, gave the widowed Mme Crompton the Légion d'honneur for Foreign Affairs.

During World War II, her courage was admired in France, and she was hated in Germany. However, she became close to certain members of the Gestapo, including François Spirito.

== Political career ==
In 1945, now famous as the "heroine of two wars", she was elected to the municipal council of the 4th arrondissement of Paris on the Christian-Democrat MRP ticket. When she was accused of claiming 300,000 francs for the release of a convicted German traitor, her reputation saved her. But her many contradictions raised skepticism among some people.

When the MRP wanted to outlaw prostitution, she argued this case to the municipal council, but they refused. Then on 15 December 1945, she presented a plan for the closing of brothels in the 4th arrondissement. The proposition was passed, and they were closed within three months. Encouraged, Marthe Richard began a campaign to end prostitution in all of France.

On 9 April 1946, Marcel Roclore, Minister of State, presented the Commission's report on the population and public health, and concluded that closing the brothels was a necessity. Pierre Dominjon proposed a bill for this purpose. The bill, now known as La loi Marthe Richard, was passed with the votes of an unusual alliance of the Christian democrat MRP and the Communists.

On 13 April 1946, the prostitution registry was destroyed and 1,400 brothels were closed, including 180 in Paris. Many brothels were converted into hotels, which prostitutes continued to use. This ended the Regulation System. Prostitution was still legal, though many acts surrounding it were made illegal.

=== Nationality controversy ===
A controversy surrounding her nationality came up in 1948. She was British by her marriage to Thomas Crompton (her repatriation was denied in 1937). Thus, her election was illegal, as were the votes she had participated in.

Meanwhile, the director of Le Crapouillot, Jean Galtier-Boissière, denounced her services to the nation, accusing her of involvement with organized crime, of smuggling jewels, and of covering up crimes. The inspector of national safety, Jacques Delarue, a specialist in false heroes of war, inquired into the accusations, and found them to be false in 1954. She was called La Veuve qui clôt ("The Widow who closes"), a pun by Antoine Blondin on the champagne Veuve Clicquot and "maisons closes" (shut or closed houses), another term for brothels.

== See also ==
- Prostitution in France
- Mata Hari
