= Carmen Damedoz =

French aviator (1890–1964)

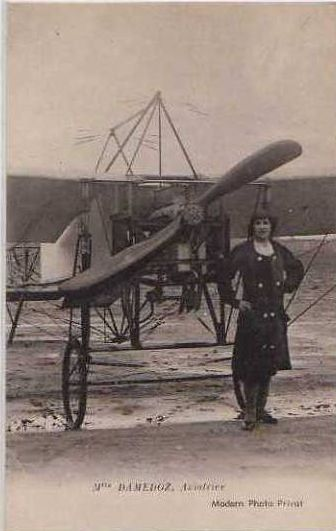
- Born: Marie Élise Provost; May 17, 1890; 14th arrondissement of Paris
- Died: May 14, 1964 (aged 73); 20th arrondissement of Paris
- Burial place: Cimetière parisien de Saint-Ouen
- Other name: Mrs. Provost-Damedoz
- Occupations: Dancer, model, aviator

Carmen Damedoz née Marie Élise Provost (17 May 1890 - 14 May 1964) was a French dancer, artist's model and aviator, earning pilot's licence No. 1449 from the Aéro-club de France on 22 August 1913.

== Early life ==
Marie Élise Provost was born on 17 May 1890 in the 14th arrondissement of Paris, daughter of Richard Provost, a civil engineer specialising in earthworks, and Marie Louise Dirant, a housewife.

== Career - dancer and artists model ==
She adopted the Hispanic-sounding pseudonym Carmen Damedoz - her complexion and black hair may have suggested she was Spanish - and became known as a dancer, sometimes wearing a Spanish costume or shawl. She became the model for several artists including Antoine Bourdelle, Alberto Giacometti and Auguste Rodin, to whom she became close.

== Flying ==
In May 1911, in Issy-les-Moulineaux, Damedoz attended the start of the Paris-Rome-Turin air race, organised by Le Petit Parisien, and discovered her vocation as a pilot. In the following months she learned to fly aeroplanes at the Vidamée aerodrome, near Courteuil, and earned her pilot's licence on 22 August 1913, in a Sommer biplane.

Her test flight was not easy: during her first eight, the 25hp engine lost power and the aircraft slid to the ground, causing slight damage and resulting in two broken ribs. For her second attempt, she flew a Sommer with a 50hp engine and passed her test with flying colours. She was the last woman to pass the flying test before the outbreak of the First World War. She joined of la Stella (Aéroclub Féminine la Stella), which had been set up by Marie Surcouf to bring together female sports pilots.

In December 1913, at the controls of a Gnome-Saulnier monoplane equipped with a 50hp engine, her engine failed, but she won the gold medal for the women's altitude prize, offered by Senator Émile Reymond, by reaching 1,020 metres (3,350 ft) or 1,050 metres (3,440 ft) depending on the source. This flight lasted 38 minutes and took place at the Vidamée aerodrome. The magazine L'Aérophile described her as one of the best known aviatrixes of her time, with exceptional energy and tenacity.

== First World War ==
At the beginning of the war, she was keen to be mobilised and placed at the disposal of the ministre de la Guerre with her aircraft, but was not called upon. As treasurer of the Union patriotique des aviatrices de France, alongside Marthe Richer - its secretary, she demanded the right to contribute to the war effort as an aviator. But the military authorities refused to allow their participation.

== Post war ==
In 1922, she was photographed naked next to a fully clothed Alberto Giacometti in the studio of the Académie de la Grande-Chaumière, by Marion Walton, an American student at the school.

== Personal life ==
According to marginal notes made on her birth certificate, she married Prosper Jean Henri Maurice Berger, an aviator, in Paris in 1919, and divorced him three years later. She then married Émile Léon Camus on 7 October 1922, in Pougny, Nièvre. But these marginal notes were cancelled by two judgments of 1924, transcribed in 1931, indicating that her marriage to Émile Léon Camus actually dated from 20 May 1914. She remained officially married to him until his death.

Marie Élise Provost died on 14 May 1964 at her home at 227 avenue Gambetta in the 20th arrondissement of Paris. She was buried five days later in the Parisian cemetery of Saint-Ouen.

== Bibliography ==
- Françoise Chapart, «Un passé tout récent et déjà oublié: les aviateurs de la Vidamée», Comptes rendus et mémoires, Société d'histoire et d’archéologie de Senlis, 1977, pp. 49–62
- Rodin et ses modèles : le portrait photographié, catalogue de l'exposition 24 avril 1990 - 3 juin 1990. Paris: Musée Rodin. 1990. p. 119. ISBN 978-2-901428-26-8.
- Rodin 300 dessins. La saisie du modèle 1890-1917, catalogue de l'exposition 18 novembre 2011 - 1er avril 2012. Paris: Musée Rodin, Éditions Nicolas Chaudun. 2011. p. 256.
- Rodin et la danse, catalogue de l'exposition 7 avril 2018 - 22 juillet 2018 (in French). Paris: Musée Rodin, Hazan. 2018. p. 192. ISBN 978-2-7541-1451-6.
