= Jane Herveu =

Pioneering French aviator

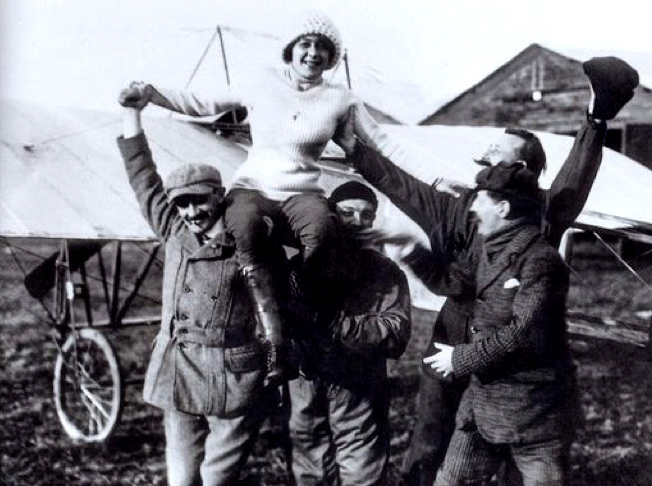
- Born: 10 December 1885; Paris
- Died: January 14, 1955 (aged 69)

Jeanne Aline Herveux, generally known as Jane Herveu, (10 December 1885 – 14 January 1955) was a pioneering French aviator who obtained her pilot's licence, no. 318, on 7 December 1910.

== Early life ==
Born on 10 December 1885 in Paris, Herveux was first known as an automobile exhibition driver, performing at the Crystal Palace in London and taking part in car and motorcycle races at various locations in France.

== Flying career ==
After training at the Louis Bleriot's flying school, she received French Licence No. 318 on 7 December 1910, becoming the fourth woman in France to be licensed after Elise Deroche, Marthe Niel and Marie Marvingt. Herveux became a member of the Aéroclub féminin la Stella, a women's flying club set up by Marie Surcouf in 1909. From 28 May to 8 June 1911 she appeared at the flying exhibition in Lyon. After several other appearances, she competed in the Femina Cup in 1911 but did not win. She opened a flying school for women but it was not successful.

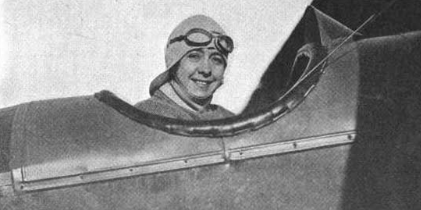
Jane Herveu, 1921

== Later life ==
In 1913, she married Paul Boulzaguet. After the end of the First World War, she moved to the United States where she worked in fashion. She died on 14 January 1955.
