= Marie Surcouf =

French balloonist and feminist (1863–1928)

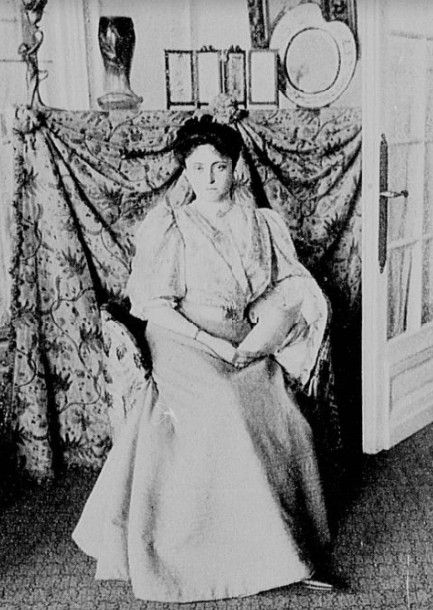
- Surcouf in 1906
- Born: Marie Valentine Nelly Bayard; 19 May 1863; Ham, Somme, French Second Empire
- Died: 11 March 1928 (aged 64); Paris, French Third Republic
- Occupations: Balloonist, feminist
- Spouse: Édouard Surcouf

Marie Surcouf (19 May 1863 – 11 March 1928) was a French balloonist and feminist. In 1906, she was the first French woman to earn an aeronautical balloon pilot's license and later that year she became the first French woman to pilot a balloon flight with an all-woman crew. Surcouf founded the women's aeronautical club Aéroclub féminin la Stella and served as its president.

== Early life and marriages ==
Marie Valentine Nelly Bayard was born on 19 May 1863 at Ham (Somme) the daughter of Félicie (née Pollet) and Ernest Julien Bayard.

On 7 February 1882, she married Alberic Roussel (1853–1904), a medical doctor. They had two children: Pierre Roussel, (9 – 22 April 1886) and André Roussel (1888–1968). André later became a dirigible pilot. The couple lived at 5 rue Charlot, in the 3rd arrondissement of Paris. On 31 July 1896, she divorced Alberic Roussel.

On 20 September 1897, Marie married Édouard Surcouf, engineer and balloonist in the 7th arrondissement of Paris. She became famous for her aeronautical adventures under her married name, Marie Surcouf. The couple later divorced on 29 November 1916.

== Le Comité des Dames de l'Aeronautique-Club de France (ACDF) ==
Marie Surcouf's husband Edouard Surcouf was a member of the Aeronautique Club de France (ACDF), then a ballooning association, founded in October 1897. He had been a member since May 1902, but club statutes as agreed in 1902 did not admit women as members in any capacity.

At a meeting of the Management Committee on 27 October 1903, the club president, Jules Saunière, raised the question of recognizing women as members of the ACDF, inspired by the number of women participating in balloon ascents or related to the men in the club and interested in its work. It took until the Management Committee meeting on 8 May 1904 for an agreement that women related to ACDF members could officially participate in the balloon ascents, for the not inconsiderable sum of 80 French francs. At the AGM held on 21 October 1904, article 4 of the statutes were modified to allow "Ladies related to club members" to be admitted with "the same rights and advantages […] and the same obligations" as male members, with the restriction, that they could not be part of the Management Committee. If they were to participate in balloon ascents, it must only be done in the company of one of their two sponsors.

On 14 November 1904, the first women registered as honorary members of the ACDF. They were Madame Saunière, wife of the president, Madame Gritte and Madame Marie Surcouf. In January 1906, a women's committee Comité des Dames de l'ACDF was formed and the first meeting was held on 2 February, with its rules adopted on 6 February by the main ACDF Executive Committee. Marie Surcouf was elected as chairwoman, the vice-chairman was Mrs. Saunière, the wife of the chairman of the ACDF, and the Secretary was Miss Gache.

From March 1906, new members joined the Women's Committee and it began to expand with the first Women's Committee event taking place on 24 May 1906 at the ACDF's balloon park, located at the Rueil gas factory for easy access to the lighter than air gases required to lift the balloons. Around 600 people gathered to watch ascents and balloon releases.

On 28 July 1906, Marie Surcouf earned her aeronautical balloon pilot's license. On 23 August she made her first flight as a pilot aboard the balloon "Bengali". She was accompanied by Miss Gache, the Secretary of the Women's Committee. This was the first balloon flight with an all-woman crew. They flew from the Parc des Coteaux in Saint-Cloud, to Neuilly sur Marne, in a flight lasting 2 hours and 45 minutes, and a distance of around 31 kilometers.

In December 1906, the membership of the Ladies' Committee had reached 42, and increased to 55 in March 1907. The increasing membership represented "un gage du triomphe du féminisme aéronautique" a "symbol of the triumph of aeronautical women" for Marie Surcouf.

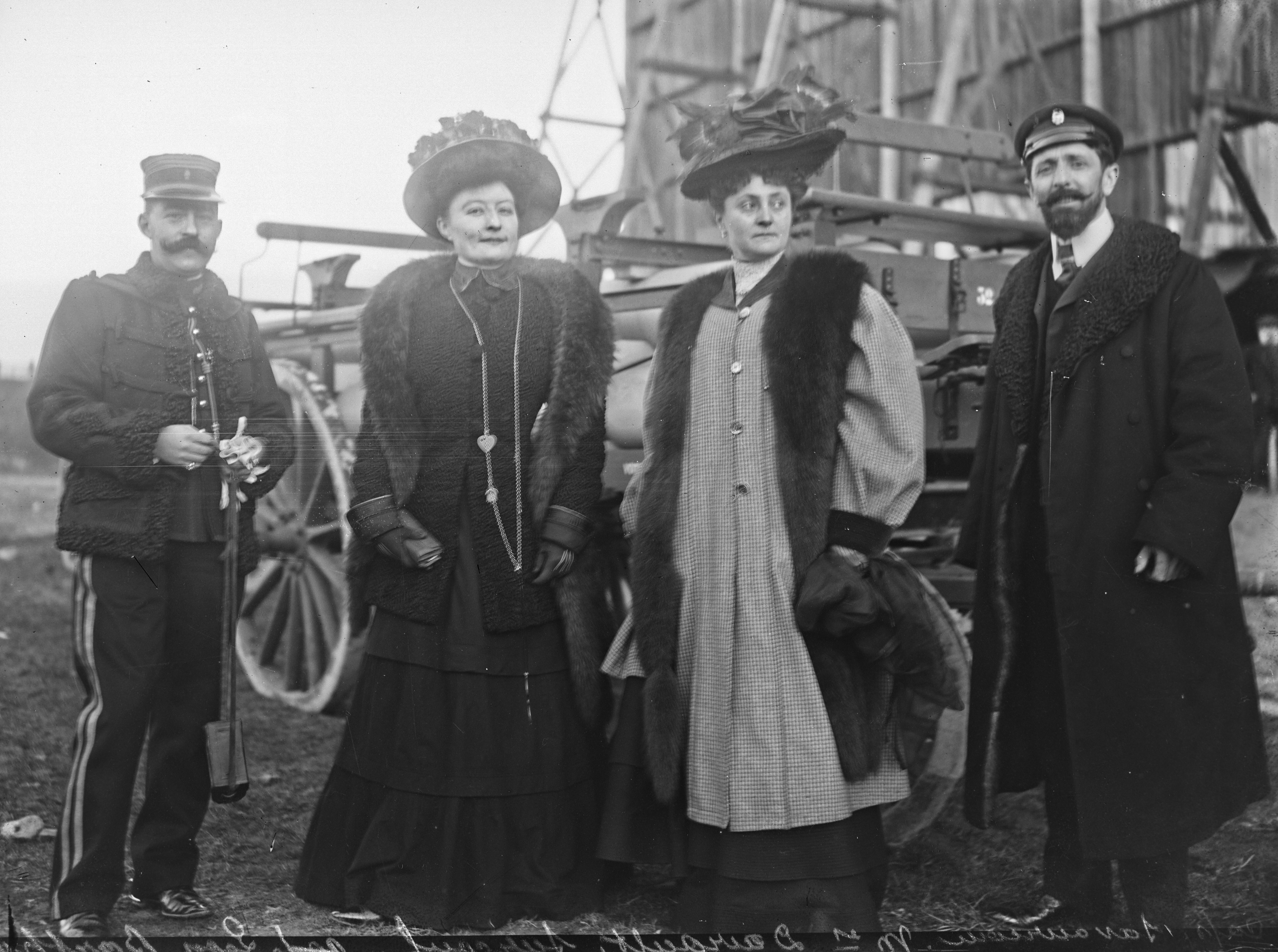
Captain Savoureau, Mmes Dairault, Surcouf and Léon Barthou in 1907

Whilst the Women's Committee was a success, a dispute arose around the organization of the meal to celebrate the tenth anniversary of the ACDF in 1907, which caused tensions between the Women's Committee and the main Management Committee.

At a meeting of the Women's Committee on 13 January 1908, the members heavily criticized the ACDF Executive Committee for not taking into account the opinions of female members and for countering their initiatives. At the same meeting, the members of the Women's Committee drafted a petition which officially asked "to separate the [Women's] Committee and the ACDF". The petition was presented to the ACDF general assembly on 18 February. Vigorously defended by Marie Surcouf, and seconded by her husband Edouard, the petition was rejected by the ACDF Management Committee, which decided to manage the Ladies' Committee instead.

On 3 March 1908, the ACDF Steering Committee adopted internal regulations which redefined the role and powers of the Women's Committee. Marie Surcouf was appointed its director but was not happy with the situation so on 6 April 1908, she resigned.

== La Stella women's aeronautical club ==
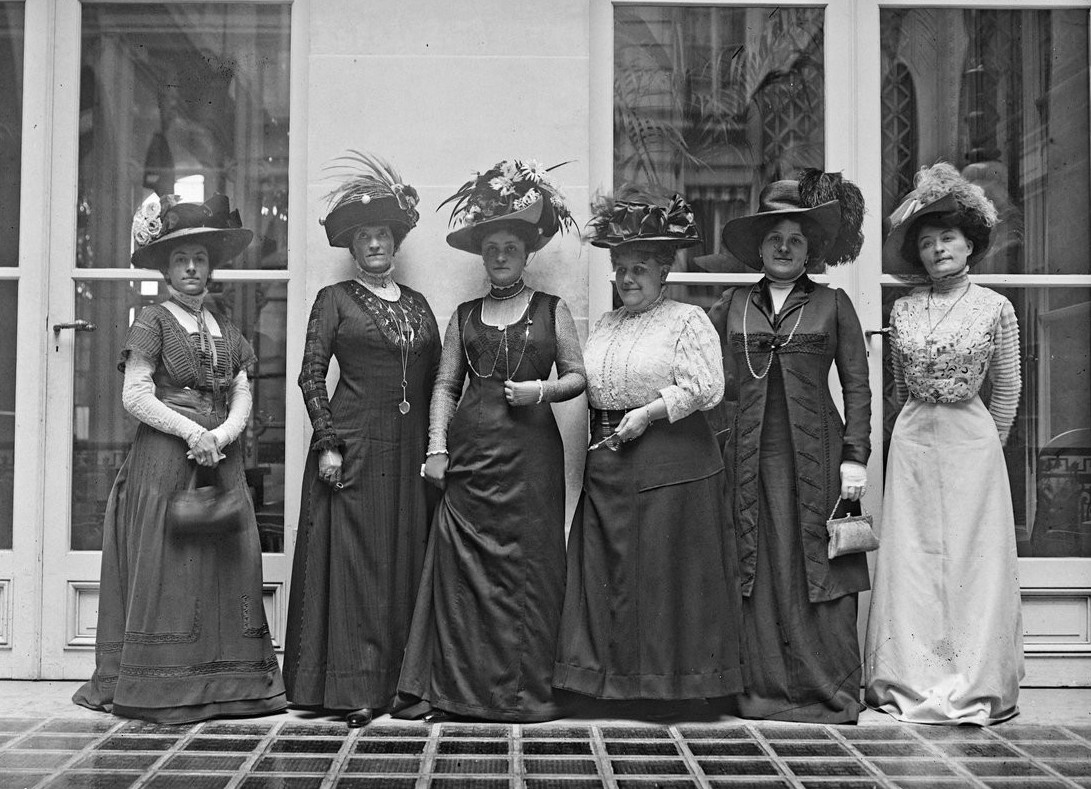
The 'Stella aeronautical club committee. Madames Savignac, VP (bureau), Desfossés-Dalloz VP, Surcouf (President), Vincent VP, Blériot VP, Airault (secretary)

Marie Surcouf's speeches and interviews reveal a woman who challenged the conventions of the Belle Époque. A speech reproduced in "L'Aéro" on 28 January 1909 declared that

"The woman, like the man, has the duty to be sporty, if she has to make a selection among the many sports practiced today, aerostatics (air ballooning) is certainly the one she will choose first."

On 10 February 1909, Marie Surcouf founded the women's aeronautical club Aéroclub féminin la Stella (La Stella). Many of early women members and members of the board of directors came from the former Ladies' Committee of the ACDF, disappointed at their treatment there. On 15 April 1909, La Stella became affiliated with the l’Aéro-Club de France. Madames Savignac, Vincent, Blériot and Desfossés-Dalloz were vice-presidents with Surcouf as president and Madame Airault as secretary.

Men were admitted as members of La Stella but did not have decision-making rights within the association, only being allowed to accompany their wives as passengers. Marie Surcouf stated that “La Stella is a women's club that allows fathers, husbands, sons or brothers of its members to accompany them on their air trips".

Initially, the head office was set up at Marie Surcouf's home, at 92 boulevard Pereire in Paris, then moved to a number of addresses in Paris, eventually settling back at 5 rue Chernoviz in 1920, the home Marie Surcouf lived in after her second divorce.

In April 1910, Surcouf was quoted as saying that la Stella was "a school of energy, poetry, gentleness... a movement of well-understood feminism ... aerial sport is an attraction because it helps to develop the qualities of initiative, strong will and disregard for danger, which have become indispensable to current feminist aspirations."

Stella, école d'énergie, de poésie, de douceur... est un mouvement de féminisme bien compris et tout le sport aérien est une attirance parce qu'il aide à développer les qualités d'initiative, de puissante volonté et de mépris du danger, devenues indispensables aux aspirations féministes actuelles

The club grew quickly, attracting members such as the Princesse de Polignac, the Countess of Poliakoff, Anne, Duchess of Uzès, Mrs. Gabrielli, wife of Senator Gabrielli and Madame Henriette Poincaré, wife of the French president Raymond Poincaré. La Stella organised conferences, cultural and musical evenings, tea parties called "Stella-Thé", and developed a tradition of annual banquets, as well as balloon ascents and flights by plane, and visits to aeronautical facilities.

On 17 June 1909, Marie Surcouf became the holder of the first sports pilot's license awarded to a woman. This certificate was awarded by l'Aéro-Club de France and required the balloon pilot to have undertaken 10 ascents with only two persons onboard, and one ascent undertaken at night.

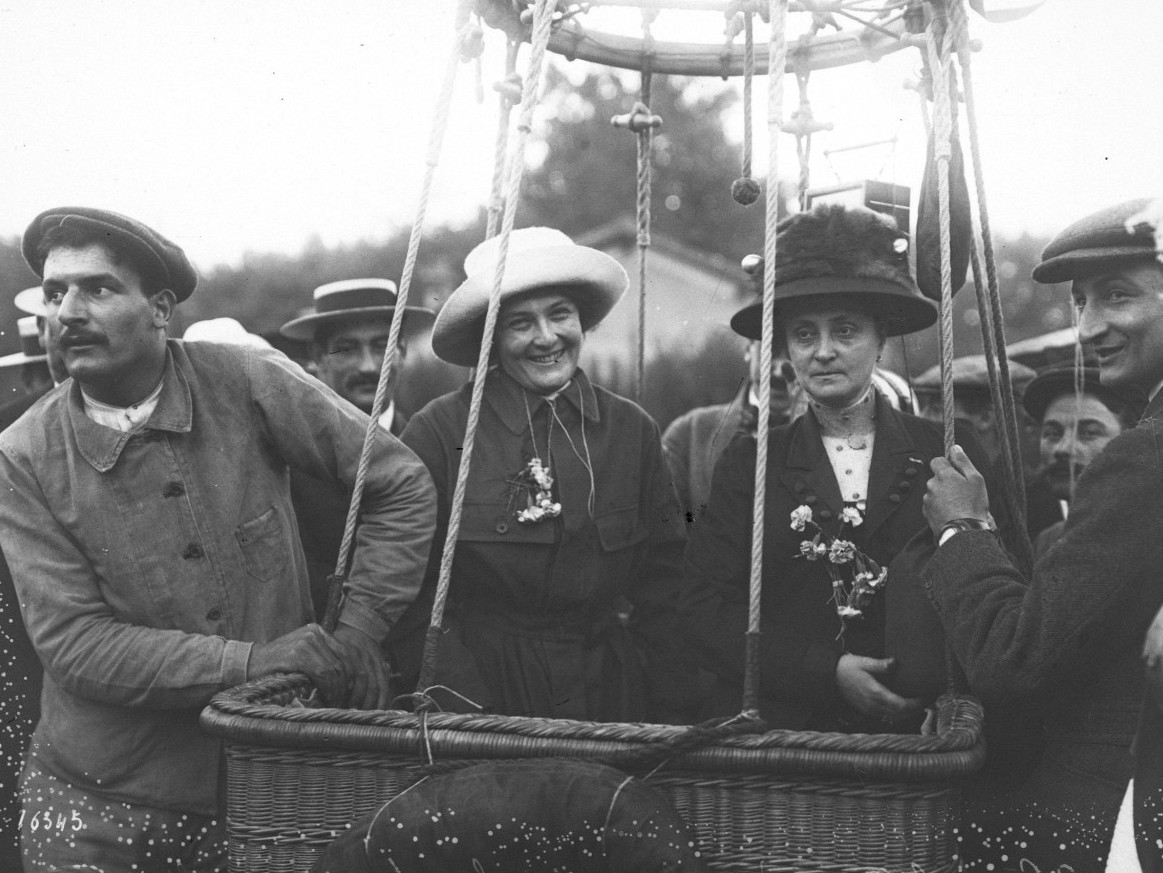
Surcouf (on the right) and Mme. Goldschmidt ballooning in September 1911. Marie Goldschmidt would later establish a distance record of 2,434 km with René Rumpelmayer.

In 1911, la Stella had 122 members, 79 of them women. At the end of 1913, this had increased to 350 members. The AGM on 17 March 1914 recorded that La Stella's membership included 6 women balloon pilots and 7 aviators: Jeanne Pallier, Carmen Damedoz, Marthe Richer, Hélène de Plagino, Marie-Louise Driancourt and Hélène Dutrieu. The Netherlands Indies Dutch Béatrix de Rijk (aka Beatrice Deryck) was another member and she was both a balloonist and an aviator.

On 17 December 1912, at the Palais d'Orsay, during the great annual banquet of la Stella, Marie Surcouf plead the cause of women.

La femme de sport n'efface pas, croyez-le bien, les sentiments de la femme tout simplement. L'empire des airs appartient à tous, et qui oserait contester que la femme n'a pas le droit à la conquête des étoiles. Ce que l'homme parvient à acquérir par sa force musculaire, par son endurance physique, la femme le conquiert aussi par sa volonté, sa ténacité et son courage.

"The sportswoman does not, believe it or not, erase the feelings of the woman. The empire of the air belongs to everyone, and who would dare to dispute that women do not have the right to conquer the stars. What men achieve through their muscular strength and physical endurance, women also achieve through their will, tenacity and courage."

== First World War ==
The aeronautical and social activities of the club were suspended in August 1914 following the outbreak of the First World War. Members of La Stella, under Surcouf's presidency, organized charitable events in support of military aeronautics.

In the mid-1920s, Marie Surcouf tried to relaunch the women's flying club without much success. Finally, the announcement of the dissolution of La Stella was made on 30 June 1926 at the meeting of the Permanent Consultative Commission of the companies affiliated to the l'Aéro-Club de France.

The era of ballooning was coming to an end, and although the use of airships continued, interest was booming in the field of aviation.

Marie Surcouf died in Paris on 11 March 1928.

== Bibliography ==
Pierre Arnaud, Histoire du sport féminin, coll. «Espace et temps du sport», Paris, L'Harmattan, 1996

- Luc Robène, L'homme à la conquête de l'air, tome 2, Paris, L'Harmattan, 1998
- L'Aéronautique, revue de l'Aéronautique-Club de France (1902–1908), archives de l'Aéronautique-Club de France (ACDF), aérodrome de Meaux-Esbly, 77450 Isles-lès-Villenoy
- Registres des comptes-rendus du Comité des Dames, archives de l'Aéronautique-Club de France, aérodrome de Meaux-Esbly, 77450 Isles-lès-Villenoy
- Aéronautique-Club de France (ACDF), centre d'instruction aéronautique fondé en 1897, aérodrome de Meaux-Esbly, 77450 Isles-lès-Villenoy
- L'Aérophile, revue de l'Aéro-Club de France, à consulter sur le site Gallica, https://gallica.bnf.fr
- Jacqueline Roussel-Reine, Quand les ballons disputaient le ciel aux oiseaux, Genève, 2003. Histoire de Marie Surcouf-Bayard racontée par sa petite fille.
