= Marie Goldschmidt =

French balloonist

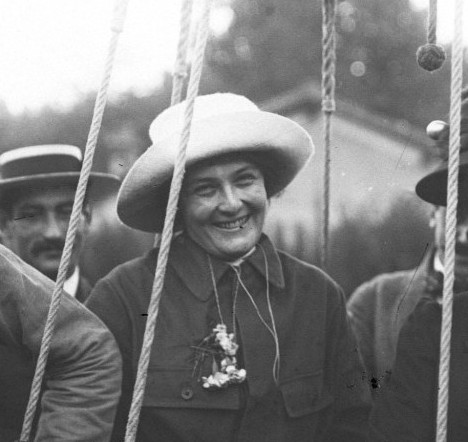
- in 1911 when ballooning with Marie Surcouf
- Born: Marie Eugenia Kann; 1880
- Died: 1917 (aged 36–37)
- Other name: Madame Gustave Goldschmidt
- Known for: an aeronaut and world distance record holder
- Spouse: Gustave Goldschmidt

Marie Goldschmidt aka Mme. (Gustave) Goldschmidt born Marie Kann (1880–1917) was a French aeronaut who co-piloted a balloon world distance record in 1913 of over 2,400 km. She was the first woman to enter an Fédération Aéronautique Internationale balloon race when she finished sixth in the Gordon Bennett Cup.

== Early life ==
Marie Kann was born in 1880 to Maximilien Edouard Hirsch Kann (1842-1901) and Saraline KÖNIGSWARTER (1849-1925). She married Gustave Goldschmidt and frequently used his name as "Madame Gustave Goldschmidt".

== Ballooning ==
Goldschmidt came to notice as a balloonist. In 1911 she was flying with Marie Surcouf, President of the French balloon club for women aeronauts known as "La Stella"; and with Beatrix de Rijk, an Indonesian Dutch balloon pilot, first Dutch woman to earn an aviator pilot's license. She was a member of the Aéroclub féminin la Stella, a women's flying club set up by Marie Surcouf in 1909, and was on the managing committee.

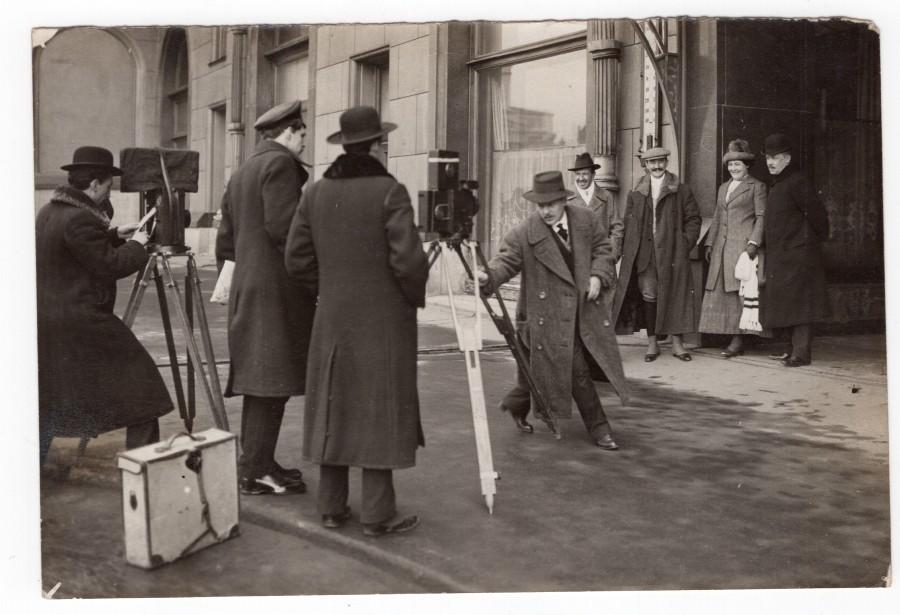
Rumpelmeyer and Goldschmidt being welcomed and photographed in 1913

She set out with René Rumpelmayer in 1913 and their balloon travelled over 2,400 km from St Cloud near Paris to a landing in Russia. When they arrived in Russia they were given a reception by Robert Fulda and Stephan Ivanovitch Osoviecki of the Sports Club of the Moscow Imperial Aeronautics Society.

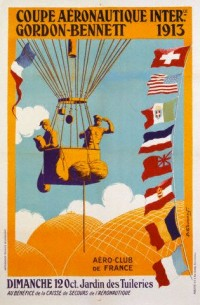
Poster for the 1913 Gordon Bennett ballon competition

Later that year she and Rumpelmayer entered the eighth annual balloon distance competition (The Gordon Bennett Cup) in October 1913. The competition had begun in 1906 and it continues each year as the "premier event of world balloon racing". The first woman to enter this competition was Goldschmidt, in fact she was the first woman to enter any Fédération Aéronautique Internationale (FAI) balloon race anywhere. They set off from Paris and finished sixth out of twenty one entries. They travelled 437 km and they were the best French team.

It took until the 1980s before a woman pilot, Nini Boesman, would fly in that competition.

Goldschmidt's exploits as an aeronaut ceased when the First World War broke out. She died in 1917 whilst working as a nurse.
