= Robert Fulda =

Russian Football Coach

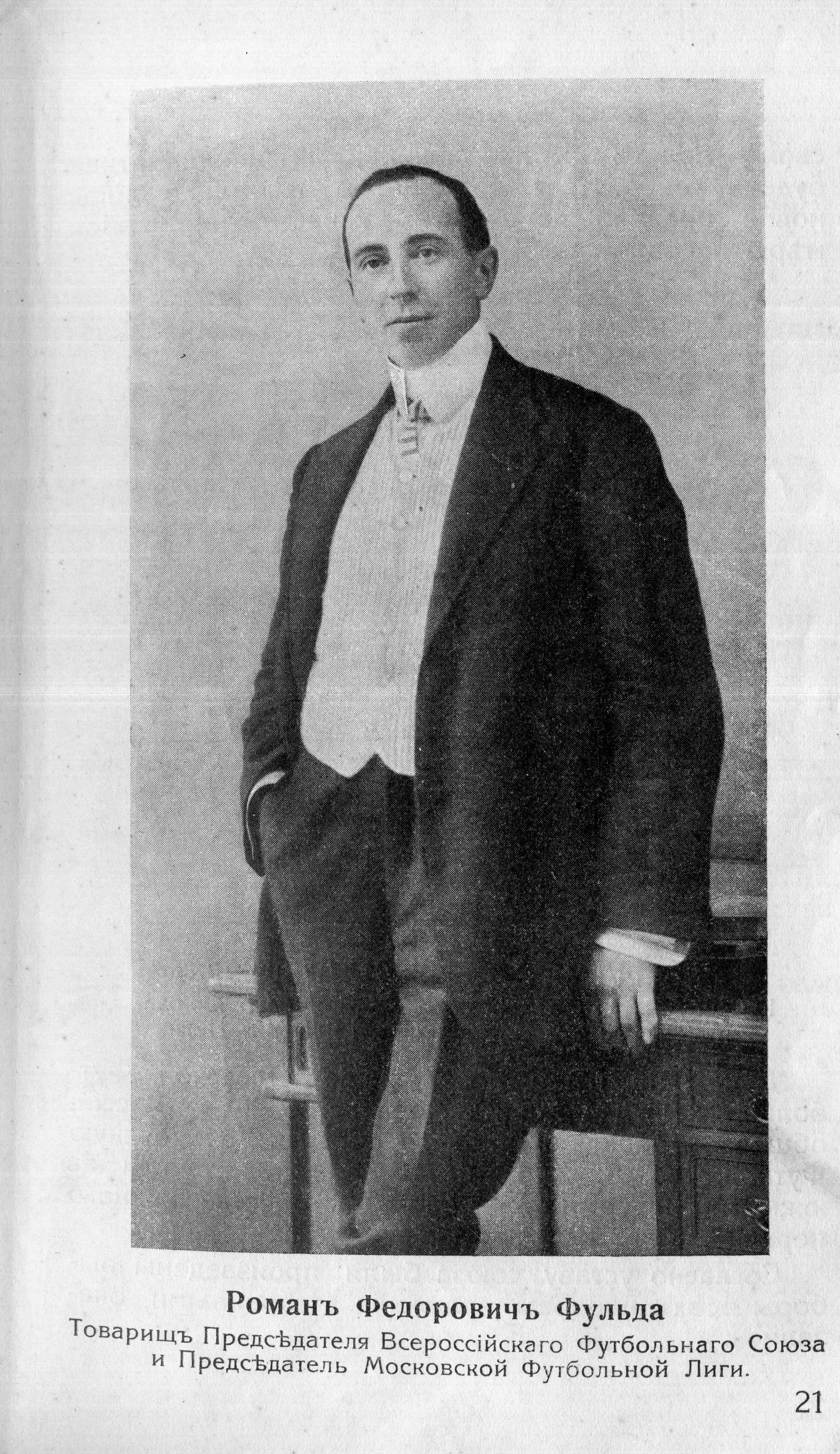

Personal information
- Full name: Robert Ferdinandovich Fulda
- Date of birth: 18 April 1873
- Place of birth: Moscow, Russian Empire
- Date of death: 16 February 1944 (aged 70)
- Place of death: Lausanne, Switzerland

Managerial career
- Years: Team
- 1914: Russian Empire

Robert Ferdinandovich Fulda (Russian: Роман Фёдорович Фульда; 18 April 1873 – 16 February 1944), was a Russian sports and flight enthusiast who is considered as the "pioneer of Russian sport".

== Life ==
Fulda was born into a family of German merchants, who emigrated to Russia in the mid-19th century. Fulda graduated from the Moscow University as a lawyer, but was not interested in practicing his profession.

As an athlete, he was mostly interested in tennis and football. Fulda was one of the pioneers of Russian football and the founder of Sokolniki Sports Club. In 1904, he translated the rules of association football and later organized the Moscow Football League. At the 1912 Summer Olympics, he was the assistant coach of the Russian Empire national football team. In 1914, Fulda became the manager of the national team and was also elected as the chairman of the All-Russian Football Union.

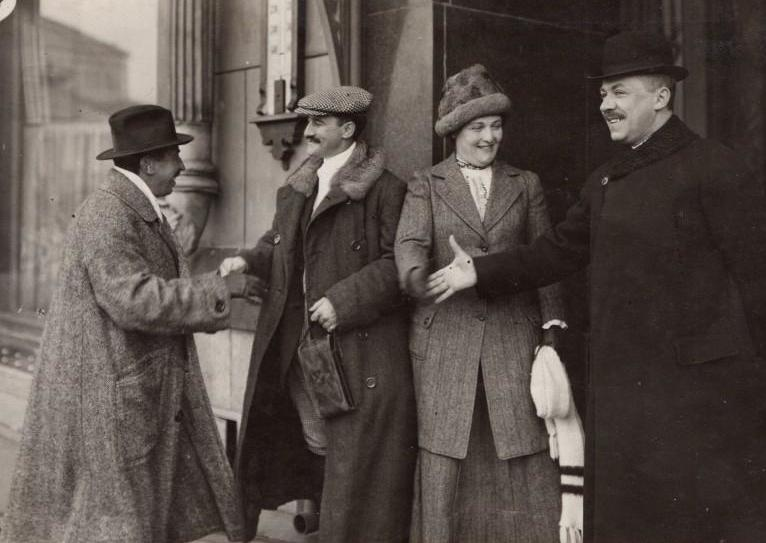
Rumpelmeyer and Goldschmidt being welcomed by Fulda and Stephan Ivanovitch Osoviecki in 1913

Fulda was also interested in flight. He was the President of Sports Club of the Moscow Imperial Aeronautics Society and Stephan Ivanovitch Osoviecki was vice-President. In 1913 they arranged a reception for the French aeronauts, Rumpelmayer and Marie Goldschmidt who had travelled over 2,400 km by balloon from Paris.

After the 1917 Russian Revolution, Fulda fled to Germany and later settled in Switzerland.
