= Femina Cup =

Award to honour women pilots(Established: 1910)

The Femina Cup or Coupe Femina was an award of 2000 francs established in 1910 by Pierre Lafitte, the publisher of French women's magazine Femina, to honour women pilots. This French challenge was opened to women aviators only.

== About ==
The Coupe Femina was awarded to the woman who, by sunset on 31 December each year, had made the longest flight, in time and distance, without landing. In 1910, Belgian pilot Hélène Dutrieu, the first winner, was lifted out of her airplane and carried on the shoulders of the spectators after she landed.

It is often difficult to determine who the official winner was, since each temporary leader (e.g. Marie Marvingt in 1911) was referred to in several contemporary records as having "won" the cup, only to be superseded by the next temporary record. Thus, in various documents, there are several "winners" recorded for each year, but the formal winners were announced in Femina Magazine. It was first formally awarded to Hélène Dutrieu on 31 December 1910 for her record-breaking non-stop flight. She won it again for the second time in 1911.

Note: There was also a "Coupe Femina" for women's golf, in this same period.

== Winners ==
- Hélène Dutrieu – 31 December 1910 for a non-stop flight of 167 kilometers in 2 hours 35 minutes
- Hélène Dutrieu won the second time in 1911.
- There was no Coupe Femina competition in 1912.
- Raymonde de Laroche – 25 November 1913 for a non-stop long-distance flight of over 4 hours duration

== Events ==
Year	Aviators	Place	Distance	Duration of flight	Day
1910	Hélène Dutrieu	Étampes	167.2 km	2 hours 41 min	22 December
	Marie Marvingt	Mourmelon	45 km	53 m	27 November
	Jane Hervue	Pau		2h 02	
1911	Hélène Dutrieu	Étampes	143 miles (230 km)	2 hours, 58 min	31 December
	Jane Herveu	Compiegne	248		
	Marie Marvingt				
1912	Marie Marvingt				
1913	Elise Deroche				
1913	Jeanne Pallier	Mourmelon	290 km		November
1913	Hélène Dutrieu		254.13km		
1914					

== See also ==
- List of awards honoring women
- List of aviation awards
