= Marie-Louise Driancourt =

French pilot (1887 - 1914)

- Born: Marie-Louise Martin; 1887; Lyon, France
- Died: 1914 (aged 26–27); L'Haÿ-les-Roses, Paris, France
- Occupations: Pilot; Aviation Pioneer
- Known for: 6th woman to receive pilot's license

Marie-Louise Driancourt (née Martin, 1887–1914) was a pioneering French pilot. She was the sixth woman in the world to receive a pilot licence.

== Personal life ==
Marie-Louise Driancourt was born in Lyon, France in 1887, and later moved to Paris where she married and had three children. Her husband, an aviation enthusiast himself, encouraged her to take up flying, and she began flying lessons in 1910 at the Blériot school near Chartres.

== Flying career ==
In 1911 she transferred to the Caudron School at Le Crotoy. On June 15, 1911 she received her pilot licence, becoming the sixth woman in the world (fifth in France) to do so. For the remainder of the year she competed and participated in a number of exhibitions, including one in Pamplona, Spain, where she was commended for her achievements by Alfonso XIII. Driancourt was a member of the Aéroclub féminin la Stella, a women's flying club set up by Marie Surcouf in 1909.

In 1912, her husband was killed in a car accident. She appeared in one more exhibition, in April 1912 at Juvisy-sur-Orge, and it appears that she then ceased flying.

Driancourt died of illness in late 1914 at L'Haÿ-les-Roses.
