= Nieuport-Delage NiD 30 =

NiD 30
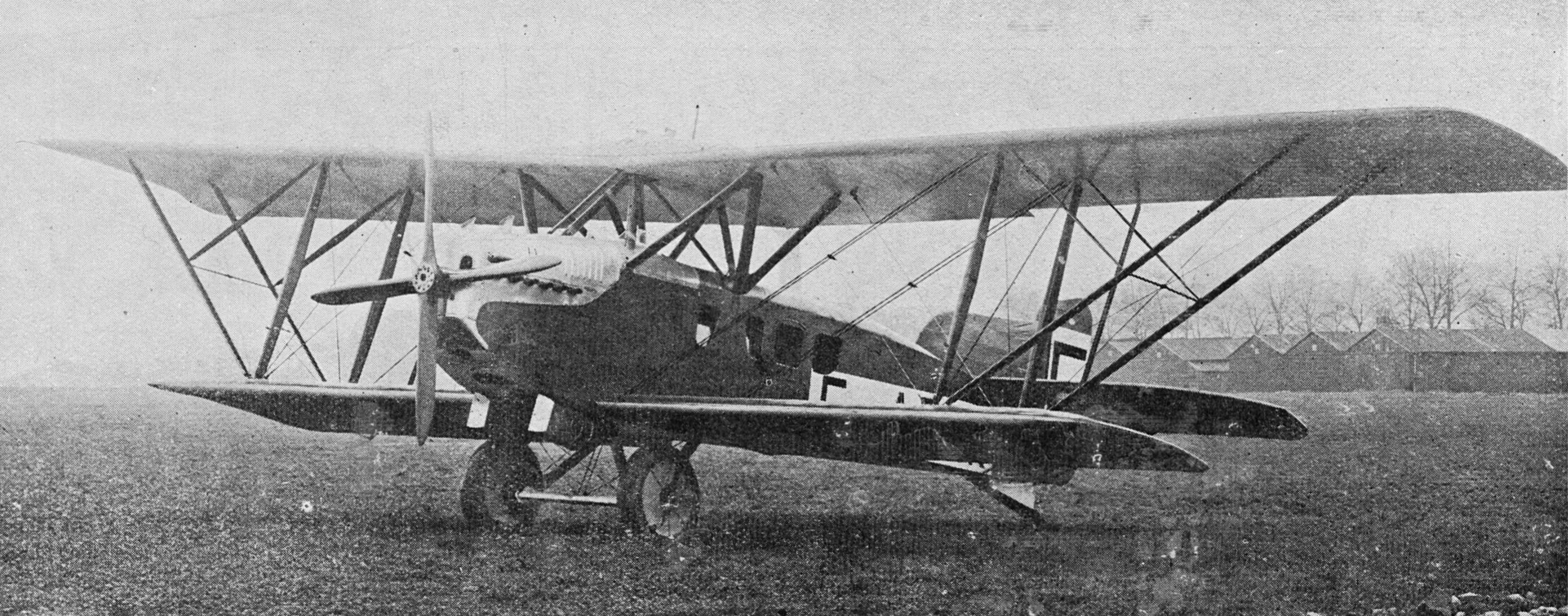
- NiD 30 T2

General information
- Type: Airliner
- National origin: France
- Manufacturer: Nieuport-Delage
- Primary user: Compagnie générale transaérienne
- Number built: 8

History
- First flight: 1919

The Nieuport-Delage NiD 30 was a French airliner which entered service in 1920. It was a reverse-stagger biplane design with an enclosed cabin that seated four passengers and an open cockpit for the pilot. Provision was also made for a wireless transmitter, receiver, and operator. Seven examples were operated by Compagnie générale transaérienne on its Paris–London route on twice-daily return services.

Following the loss of one of these machines in thick fog over the Channel on 27 April 1920, the remaining NiD-30s were fitted with an early audible guidance system. However, after a number of further accidents, these were withdrawn from service in February 1921.

A larger, six-passenger variant with longer overhung top wings was developed as the NiD 30T2 and displayed at the 1921 Salon de l'Aéronautique, but this was not produced.

== Variants ==
- NiD 30T1 - four-passenger production version with Sunbeam Matabele engine (7 built)
- NiD 30T2 - six-passenger version with Darracq 12A engine (1 built)

== Operators ==
France

- Compagnie générale transaérienne

== Specifications (NiD 30T1) ==
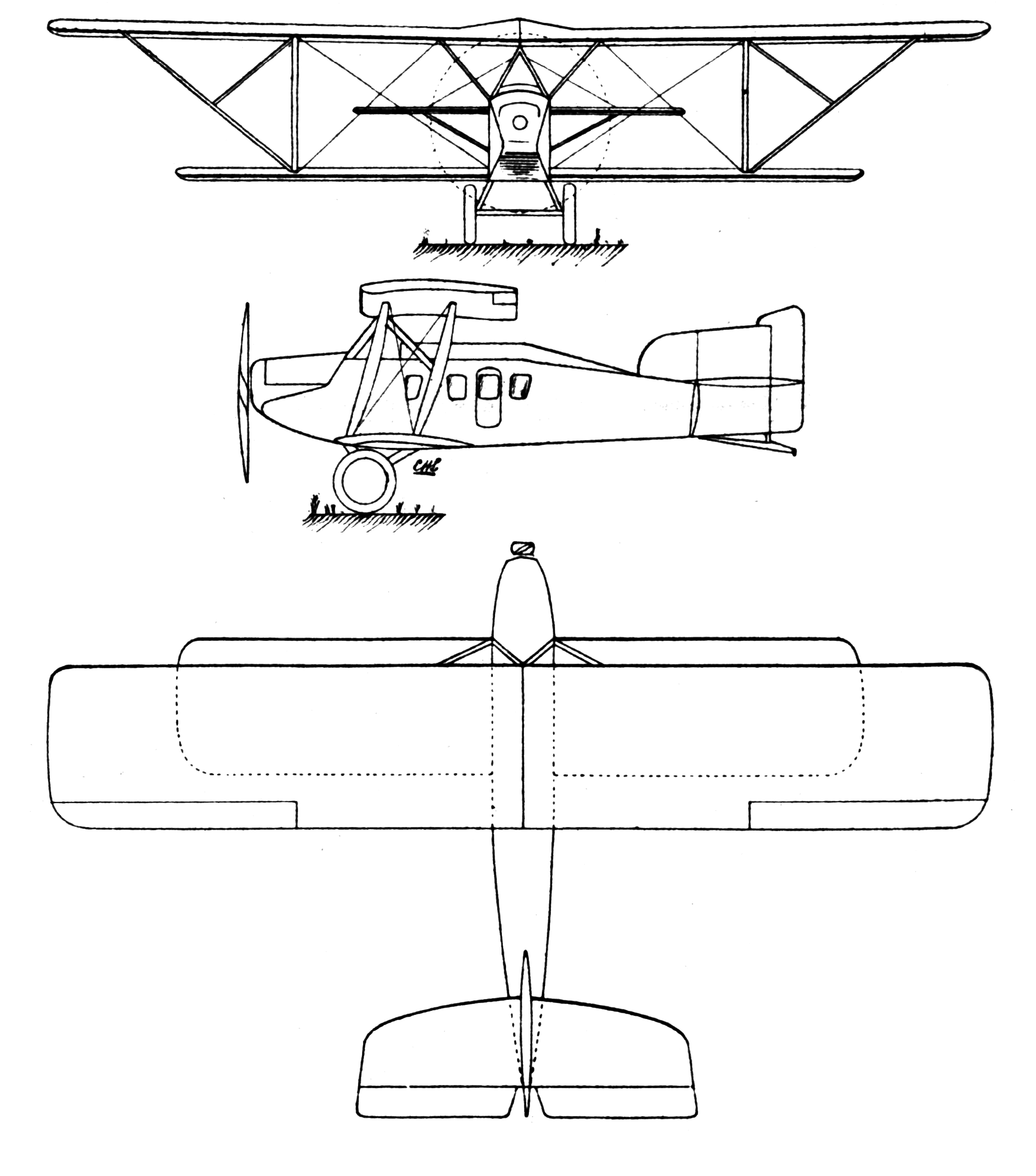
Nieuport Delage NiD 30T2 3-view drawing from Les Ailes June 23, 1921

Data from aviafrance.com

General characteristics

- Crew: One pilot
- Capacity: 4 passengers
- Length: 10.80 m (35 ft 2 in)
- Wingspan: 13.20 m (43 ft 3 in)
- Height: 4.00 m (13 ft 2 in)
- Wing area: 65.0 m^{2} (699 sq ft)
- Empty weight: 1,800 kg (3,960 lb)
- Gross weight: 2,580 kg (5,680 lb)
- Powerplant: 1 × Sunbeam Matabele , 260 kW (350 hp)

Performance

- Maximum speed: 172 km/h (108 mph, 94 kn)
- Range: 420 km (260 mi, 230 nmi)
- Service ceiling: 4,000 m (13,000 ft)

== See also ==
- 1919 in aviation
