= Compagnie générale transaérienne =

French airline

Compagnie Générale Transaérienne
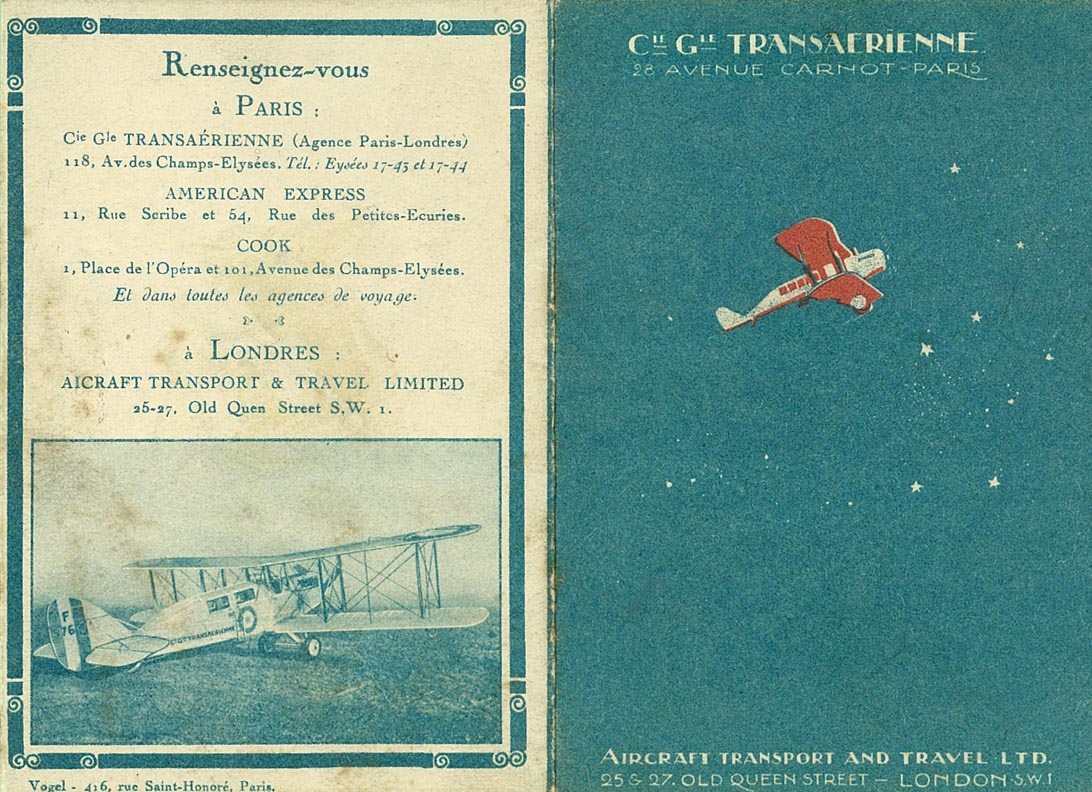
- 1920 timetable
- Type: Airline
- Industry: Air transport
- Founded: October 10, 1909 in France
- Founder: Henri Deutsch de la Meurthe
- Defunct: 1921
- Fate: Absorbed
- Successor: Compagnie des Messageries Aériennes
- Products: Mail, parcel and passenger air transport services

The CGT-Compagnie Générale Transaérienne (general transair co.) was a predecessor of Air France, founded in 1909. At first it operated airships in France and Switzerland, then added float planes and later direct flights from Paris to London. It was the first private company in the world to operate a scheduled fixed-wing passenger airline service. After World War I (1914–18) the company faced mounting competition, and in 1921 it was absorbed by a rival. It was founded by Henri Deutsch de la Meurthe and was the first French airline.

== Foundation ==
Louis Blériot registered the statutes of the Compagnie Générale Trans-aérienne (CGT) on 10 October 1909. It was the first French airline, and the first of the companies that would eventually merge to become Air France. The Compagnie générale transaérienne was the second company in the world, after DELAG, to operate a civil airline, and was owned by Henri Deutsch de la Meurthe. (Note: Henri Deutsch de la Meurthe was a patron of the fledgling air industry. His son-in-law was Gaston Gradis, later president of the Nieuport-Astra airplane manufacturing company and financier of the Compagnie générale transsaharienne airline when it was founded in 1923.) The privately owned company would operate airships and, for the first time in the world, fixed-wing airplanes. The engineer Frédéric Airault became the technical director of the airline.

== Operations ==
CGT built facilities for creating hydrogen gas at Nancy, where the dirigible Ville-de-Nancy was flown at the 1909 Exposition Internationale de l'Est de la France, and then at Beauval. It began offering pleasure trips at Pau, Pyrénées-Atlantiques, and then Lucerne. CGT operated rigid airships made by Société Astra to fly in France and Switzerland. (Note: Henri Deutsch de la Meurthe had founded the Société Astra to construct dirigibles in 1908.) The company then started operating seaplane service in Switzerland on lakes Lucerne and Geneva.

On 12 April 1911 Pierre Prier, chief pilot of the Blériot school in London, made the first flight from Paris (Issy-les-Moulineaux) to London (Hendon). This was the first non-stop air service between London and Paris. Prier flew a Blériot monoplane with a 50-horsepower Gnome engine, and made the trip in three hours and fifty six minutes. CGT then began weekly return flights between London to Paris from April to October each year carrying mail and small items such as catalogs and pieces of machinery. On 22 March 1913, GGT started the world's first scheduled passenger-carrying fixed-wing flights, operating at least one Astra CM Hydro-avion from Cannes to Nice. Two passengers could be carried. On 29 March 1913, the service was extended to Monte Carlo. Henri Deutsch de la Meurthe was interested in establishing a hydroplane station at Arcachon. On 15 April 1913 Gabriel Arnaud, director of CGT, visited Arcachon to study organization of a local aerospace committee. The project was dropped with the outbreak of World War I the next year.

With the end of World War I (1914–18) many planes and pilots became available, and numerous airlines were founded. By 1920 CGT faced competition on the London-Paris route from the Lignes Aériennes Farman, several British companies, the Dutch KLM and a new French company, the Compagnie des Messageries Aériennes (CMA). CMA had been founded in February 1919, with shareholders Louis Charles Breguet, Louis Blériot, Louis Renault and René Caudron. It flew Breguet 14 planes equipped to carry passengers from Paris (Le Bourget) to London (Croydon). CGT acquired seven Nieuport-Delage NiD 30 biplanes which it put into service on the Le Bourget to Croydon route in September 1920. The flight took two hours and fifteen minutes. After several accidents, in February 1921 CGT cancelled the service, which was taken over by CMA. CMA absorbed CGT in 1921 so that it could add postal service to its offerings. CMA and other companies would eventually merge to create Air France.

== See also ==
- List of airlines by foundation date

== Sources ==
- Dubroca, Jean (2014-07-20). "150E ANNIVERSAIRE D'ARCACHON – UN FUNICULAIRE À DEUX CLASSES". Archived from the original on 2014-11-29.
- Ferry, Vital (2005). Ciels impériaux africains, 1911-1940: les pionniers belges et français (in French). Le gerfaut. ISBN 978-2-914622-58-5.
- Hartmann, Gérard (2006-11-14). "Le développement du transport aérien en Europe (1919-1932)" (PDF) (in French).
- Hartmann, Gérard (2006b). "Les avions Nieuport-Delage" (PDF).
- "In The Beginning". Air France. Archived from the original on 2014-11-29.
- Lagrande, L. (1910-08-14). "Frédéric Airault" (PDF). L'Aérophile.
- Lázaro, Carlos (2013-05-08). Colosos del aire (in Spanish). Tombooktu. ISBN 978-84-9967-513-8.
- "L'histoire d'Air France / 1909 - 1932 Les Pionniers" (in French). Musée Air France. Archived from the original on 2014-11-29.
- Marmin, Michel (2013-05-17). Mermoz. Éditions Chronique. ISBN 979-10-90871-86-1.
- Meyniel, Stéphanie (2011-04-12). "Le 12 avril 1911 dans le ciel : 1er vol en aéroplane sans escales Londres – Paris".
- Rooss, Gérard (2014). "Centenaire des Hydravions aux Mureaux et à Triel-sur-seine". AGHYN. Archived from the original on 2014-11-29.
- Taylor, Michael J. H. (1989). Jane's Encyclopedia of Aviation. London: Studio Editions. ISBN 9780517103166.
