= Beatrix de Rijk =

Pioneering Dutch aviator

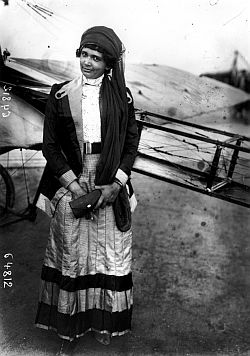
- Born: 24 July 1883; Surabaya, Netherlands Indies (now Indonesia)
- Died: 18 January 1958 (aged 74); Kijkduin, The Netherlands
- Other name: Béatrice Deryck
- Occupation: Pilot

Beatrix de Rijk (1883–1958) was a pioneering Indonesian Dutch aviator. On receiving her pilot's licence from the Aéro-Club de France on 6 October 1911, she became the first Dutch woman pilot.

== Early life ==
Born on 24 July 1883 in Surabaya in the Dutch East Indies Beatrix de Rijk was the daughter of Henriëtte Josephina van den Dungen (1850-1919), who was Javanese, and Dutch banker Augustinus Wilhelm de Rijk (1838-1905). Her family were rich; amongst other business ventures they owned the Klampok sugar factory at Banjumas in Central Java. Beatrix grew up with a passion for speed and danger, and was an excellent horsewoman, taking her horses with her on her travels through what was then called the Dutch East Indies.

On 3 April 1902, she married Herman Christiaan Johan Smeets (b. 1871), a first lieutenant with the Koninklijk Nederlands-Indische Leger, with whom she had a son, Jan, in 1903. de Rijk divorced Smeets in February 1905 and her father died six months later, so de Rijk and her mother moved to the Netherlands. Her son is thought to have remained with his father.

In the Netherlands she was the first Dutch woman to drive an Adler, but she found the car was too slow for her, so she bought an NSU-motorbike. Her mother Henriëtte did not approve of her daughter's youthful impetuosity, so de Rijk left for Paris with her inheritance.

In Paris, de Rijk started working as a mannequin for the House of Worth. She also took part in a variety of activities including riding, tennis, driving, horse races at Auteuil and hot air ballooning, joining Madame Marie Surcouf Bayard's ladies' balloon club 'la Stella', founded in 1909, but this soon began to bore her. She wanted to learn to fly aeroplanes.

== Flying career ==
When de Rijk became interested in ballooning and flying, she settled in Bétheny near Reims, where she took flying lessons at the Hanriot school, paying 2000 francs to the brothers René and Marcel Hanriot who built their own aeroplanes. She later described the Hanriot machine she flew in as no more than "some slats with a lot of tension wires, some aeroplane dust and a weak little engine", in which she sat "without any shelter with a threatening fuel tank above her head and no floor, but a fathomless depth under the flying seat". On 8 September 1911, she took and passed her flying tests, including an altitude flight of 100 metres and on 6 October 1911, she received Pilot Licence No. 652 from the Aero Club de France, becoming first Dutch woman and the sixth woman in the world to get her pilot's licence. She changed the year of her birth to 1888 on her license as she "had to show it so often." De Rijk became a member of the Aéroclub féminin la Stella, a women's flying club set up by Marie Surcouf in 1909. On 12 November 1911, de Rijk flew in a balloon with Marie Goldschmidt. During her time in France her name was sometimes gallicised to Béatrice Deryck. A journalist writing in L'Aerophile commented that her coolheadedness and bravery "would be the envy of the uglier sex".

In 1913, she bought a Deperdussin 1910 monoplane and took part in flying demonstrations in various European countries. She became famous; Parisian fashion houses asked her to wear their products, and perfumes were named after her.

When the First World War broke out in 1914, de Rijk offered her services as a pilot to the French government, but they turned her down and instructed her to leave the country as a foreign national. She had to leave her plane behind. With only a little luggage, she left for the Netherlands and wrote to the Dutch Ministry of War on 28 November 1914, but the Dutch government did not want to make use of her talent as an aviator either. On behalf of the Minister, the then Secretary-General of the Ministry, Major A.J. Doorman (1855-1927), wrote: "Should our country, however, be involved in the war, then perhaps use will be made of your offer, and your services will then be gladly used". The Dutch Government had only four aeroplanes at its disposal and this was not enough to make use of its services. At this point de Rijk gave up aviation.

== Later life and commemoration ==
Civil aviation was paused for the duration of the war and de Rijk took up racing cars instead. On 18 January 1921, she married Johannes Hendrikus van Staveren (1901-1970). In 1922 she and her husband made an unsuccessful attempt to break the speed record from Paris to The Hague in a 4-cylinder Pic-Pic car.

In May 1922 the couple left for her birthplace, Surabaya in the Dutch East Indies, but four months later they returned to the Netherlands. They moved to Blaricum, but de Rijk was declared bankrupt in 1924. Two years later, Johannes van Staveren managed to get a job as a planter in the Dutch East Indies and the couple settled in Alur Gading in Atjeh, Sumatra, with Jan, her son from her first marriage. They cultivated sugarcane, but without much success. In 1932 they went bankrupt and the family returned to the Netherlands. They went to live in Wassenaar and in 1934 Beatrix divorced her husband. Beatrix de Rijk tried to travel to Abyssinia at the end of 1935 to fight as a pilot against the Italian invaders but this plan came to naught.

During the Second World War and the Indonesian War of Independence, she lost everything. Her son Jan died in a Japanese internment camp in 1943 and her first husband disappeared without a trace in Atjeh.

In 1948 de Rijk and other aviation pioneers were invited as guests of honour to attend the flying celebration to mark the 40th anniversary of the Royal Dutch Airline Association. On 6 October 1951, she was honoured for earning her pilot's licence 40 years earlier.

In the 1950s, de Rijk lived in poverty in an upstairs flat in a side street of the Hoefkade in the Schilderswijk in The Hague. When a journalist from De Telegraaf visited her in 1952 they noted that: "I saw no rug in her room, on her bed there were rags instead of blankets. On the wall was a saying: Laugh and forget. The weekly income of Beatrix de Rijk, ... amounted to over 16 guilders (11.20 guilders for old age [pension], 5.30 guilders for her only son who was killed in Indonesia); in winter In the winter Fl. 3.50 is added for fuel." The Koninklijke Nederlandse Vereniging voor Luchtvaart (Royal Dutch Airline Association) were horrified to discover this and launched an aid campaign for her so that people could send belongings in support of de Rijk to the Avia, their official journal in The Hague, or donate via a special giro account under the slogan "Help Beatrix de Rijk". In the last years of her life, she earned some money as a dishwasher in the Palace Hotel in Scheveningen and as a cleaning lady for a family in The Hague.

After a long illness, Beatrix de Rijk died on 18 January 1958 in the Zeehospitium in Kijkduin.

Some of Beatrix de Rijk's documents, including her pilot's licence and some notes, were preserved after they ended up in the possession of Wilhelm Teuben (1928–1985), a First Lieutenant in the air force and a collector.
