= Georges Ladoux =

French spy

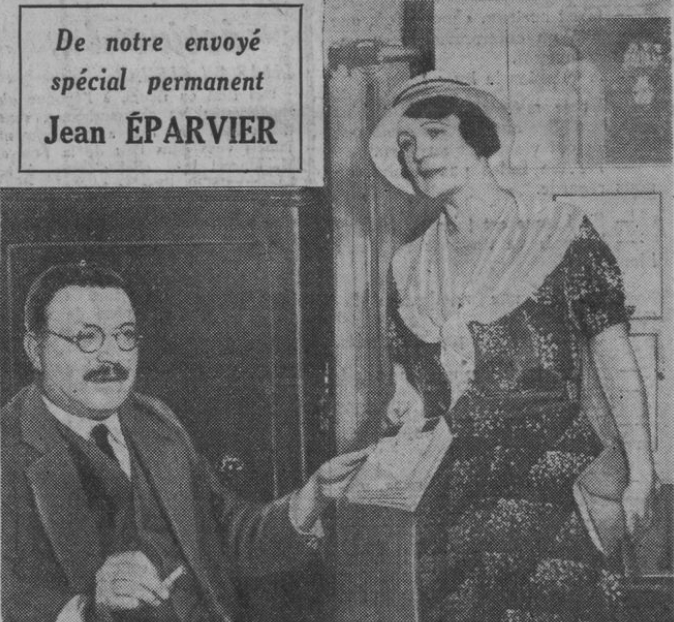
Marthe Richard and Georges Ladoux probably in 1932

Georges Ladoux (Beauchastel, 21 March 1875 - Cannes, 20 April 1933) was a French army major who served as the head of the Deuxième Bureau, the French military intelligence agency during World War I, from 1914. He was responsible for recruiting Mata Hari as a French spy, whom he met in Vittel in 1916. Ladoux was later arrested for being a double agent himself, but eventually cleared of all charges.

== Biography ==
The son of an officer, Georges Ladoux attended École spéciale militaire de Saint-Cyr (1893–1895). He also graduated from the École supérieure de guerre (1904–1906).

As a captain, he commanded the 5th Deuxième Bureau of Intelligence and Counterintelligence from August 1914 to February 9, 1917, and then the Second Bureau of Counterintelligence at General Headquarters from February 9, 1917, to October 1917.

On September 2, 1916, in Vittel, he met Mata Hari at a field hospital where she was visiting a man named Vadim Maslov, a Russian captain wounded while serving France. He offered her a job with the French Armed Forces, and she agreed to spy on the German High Command in Belgium in exchange for one million francs (which she would never receive).

He had also sent Marthe Richard to Madrid to counter the German intelligence services.

In 1917, he was accused of collaborating in the espionage case involving Congressman Louis Turmel; he was later cleared of all suspicion.
