= Frédéric Airault =

French engineer and pilot (1868-1944)

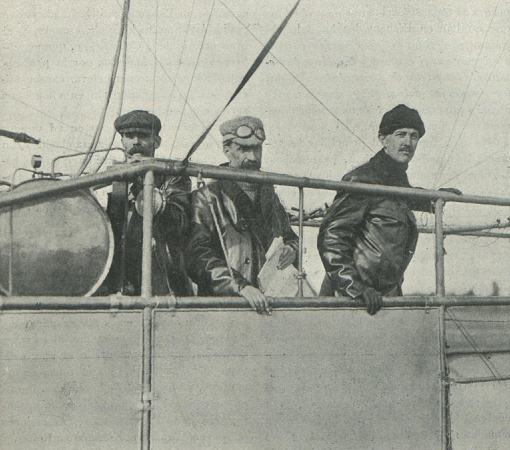
- Frédéric Airault (left), alongside Alfredo Kindelán and Pedro Vives in the airship "España"
- Born: May 18, 1868; Paris, France
- Died: October 7, 1944 (aged 76); Clichy, France
- Spouse: Mathilde Airault

Frédéric Airault (French: [fʁedeʁik ɛʁo]; born 18 May 1868 in Paris, died 7 October 1944 in Clichy) was a French engineer and airship pilot who was the technical director of a number of automobile and aviation firms before the First World War.

== Biography ==
Airault enrolled at the École des Arts et Métiers campus in Angers in 1884, gaining his diplôme d'ingénieur in 1887. Airault served with the French Navy for five years before joining the Société française de constructions mécaniques in 1892. In 1897, he designed a V-4 24-horsepower engine with progressive friction transmission, and starting in 1899 he worked at the car and bicycle manufacturer Hurtu as engineer, head of research and then Technical Director. He stayed there for four years, and in 1903 became a co-director of the Buchet factories in Levallois-Perret, a northwestern suburb of Paris. (Note: The engine maker Filtz was also based in Levallois: a 75 hp Filtz engine was fitted to the Renard Road Train imported to Britain in 1907 by the Daimler Company.) Élie Buchet, founder of Buchet, had died in late 1903.

Airault left Buchet in 1905 to become the managing director of Fabbrica di Automobili Florentia. (Note: His replacement at Buchet was Joseph-Ambroise Farcot who owned his own engineering firm. Farcot was soon joined by Alessandro Anzani, on secondment from Alcyon motorcycles whose owner Edmond Gentil had spotted him on a Hurtu motorcycle at a 1903 World Championship at the Parc des Princes, Paris. The appearance of the first of the Farcot-Anzani 3-cylinder fan engines (80 x 80 mm, 1206 cc) in an Alcyon motorcycle was announced in (L'Automobile, No. 109, 28 October 1905).) Airault stayed there for a year before becoming the technical director of the Société française des trains Renard in 1906. The Daimler Company manufactured the Road Train under licence in the UK.

The industrialists Henri Deutsch de la Meurthe and Édouard Surcouf formed Société Astra to make dirigible airships. Airault was the director of the aeronautic park for the Astra III airship Ville-de-Nancy (piloted by Édouard Surcouf and fr:Henry Kapférer) at the Exposition Internationale de l'Est de la France in Nancy in 1909. Airault piloted "Osmanli", the first Turkish airship, at the Parc Saint-Cloud on 18 April 1909.

He became technical director of Compagnie générale transaérienne (CGT, later Air France, founded in October 1909 by Louis Blériot), which was also owned by Henri Deutsch de la Meurthe. (Note: Blériot had used an Anzani 3-cylinder W fan engine of about 3 litres to power the Blériot IX across the English Channel on 25 July 1909 (he had previously used Antoinette engines).) He oversaw the installation of hydrogen gas plants at Nancy and then at Beauval for CGT. (Note: These were possibly water gas plants for continuous production of hydrogen. See "l'usine oxhydrique". MeauXfiles.)

While testing the Astra VI l’España on 5 November 1909, the propeller shaft ruptured, breaking the nacelle. Airault avoided a catastrophe, landing safely near Frémainville, Seine-et-Oise (now Val d'Oise), some 50 miles (85 km) from Meaux. Brought back to Beauval, repaired and modified, l’España was delivered to the Spanish military authorities at the start of 1910.

In August 1910, Airault received his pilot-aeronaut certificate for dirigible balloons (along with Robert Balny d'Avricourt.) CGT started operating Astra dirigibles in France and Switzerland. Airault, as the company's chief pilot, directed operations of Surcouf's Astra VII Ville de Lucerne in August 1910 in Lucerne. CGT followed this with a seaplane service on Lake Lucerne and Lake Geneva, then cross-channel flights in 1911. Henri de la Meurthe also bought the Nieuport aircraft firm after Edouard Nieuport died in a flying accident in 1911.

In 1912, Airault lived at 25, Rue de Marignan, Paris.
