= Hélène Dutrieu =

French cyclist, stunt driver and pilot

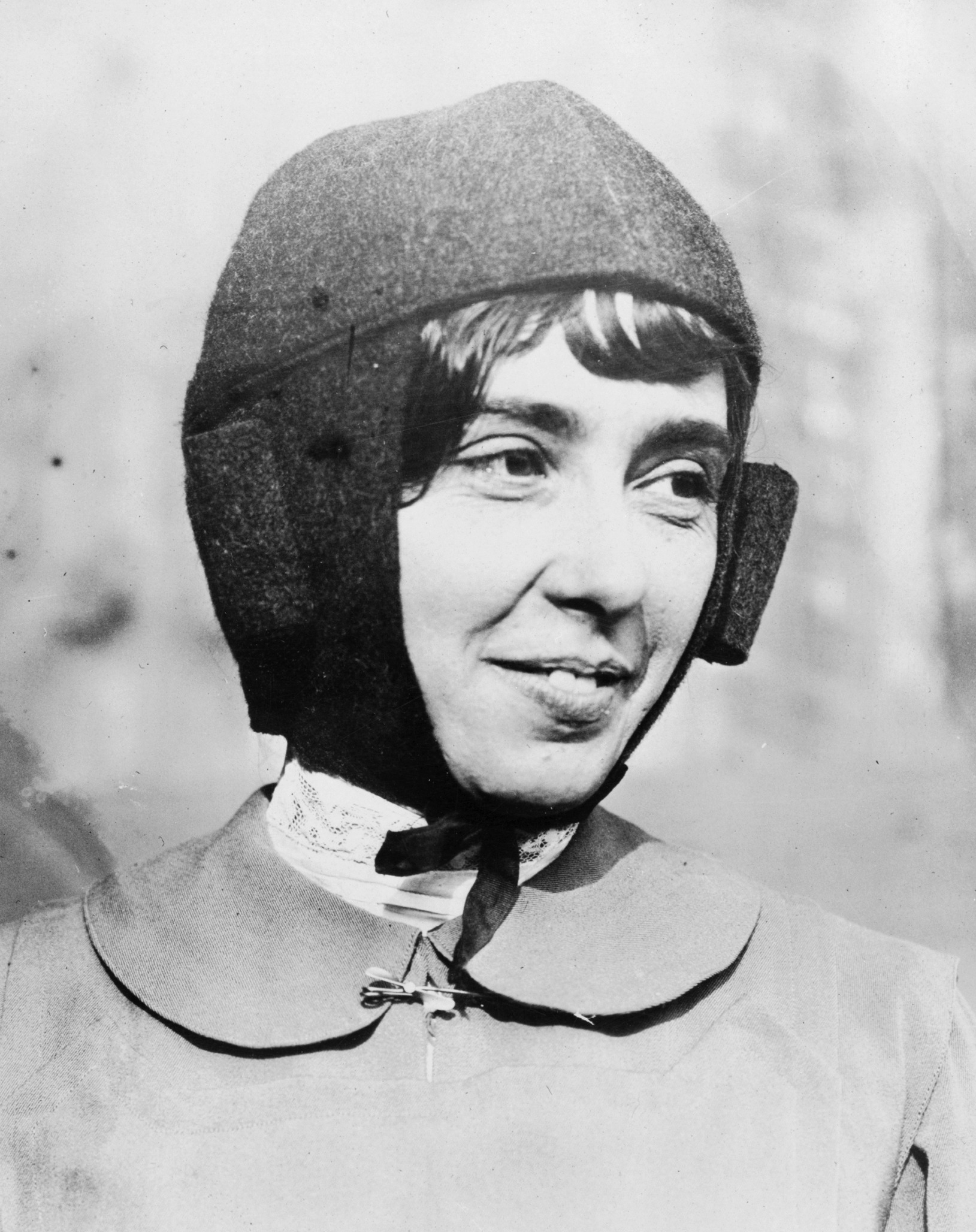
- Hélène Dutrieu dressed for flying
- Born: 10 July 1877; Tournai, Belgium
- Died: 26 June 1961 (aged 83); Paris, France
- Occupations: Cycle racer, stunt driver and pilot
- Spouse: Pierre Mortier

Hélène Dutrieu (10 July 1877 – 26 June 1961), was a Belgian cycling world champion, stunt cyclist, stunt motorcyclist, automobile racer, stunt driver, pioneer pilot, wartime ambulance driver, and director of a military hospital.

== Biography ==
Hélène Marguerite Dutrieu was born on 10 July 1877 in Tournai, Belgium, the daughter of a Belgian Army officer. The family later moved to Lille in northern France. She left school at the age of 14 to earn a living.

=== Cycling success ===
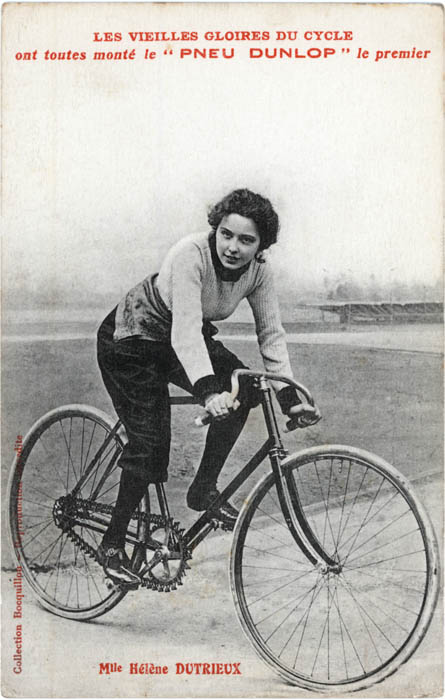
Hélène Dutrieux, probably in 1896. Bicycle equipped with Simpson lever chain

Hélène Dutrieu began her cycle racing career inspired by her older brother Eugène, a professional cyclist. She became a professional track cyclist racing for the Simpson lever chain team. In 1893 she gained the women's world record for distance cycled in one hour. In 1896 and 1897 she won the women's speed track cycling world championship in Ostend, Belgium, but lost her title in 1898 to Louise Roger. In November 1896 she won the Course de 12 Jours (12-day race) in the Royal Aquarium, London, England, and in August 1898 she won the Grand Prix d’Europe (Grand Prix of Europe). She later became a motorcycle and automobile racer.

=== Stuntwoman ===
She began performing in variety shows as a cycling speciality act and in July 1903 she cycled a loop inside a vertical track at the Eldorado in Marseille, France. She also invented her own stunt, "La Flèche Humaine" ("The Human Arrow"), which was a c. 15 m jump with a bicycle. In September 1903 she appeared at l'Olympia, Paris. She also performed in London (Crystal Palace), Berlin and other main cities. Later, she moved on to motorcycle stunts (La Moto Ailée, Saut dans la Lune), but after a bad crash in Berlin 1904 she had to spend eight months recovering her health.

=== Acting career ===
Hélène Dutrieu had played a small role at the Déjazet theatre in 1903 (she played “Hélène” in “Môssieu le Maire“ by Gustave Stoskopf). After regaining her health she went back to the theatre playing comedy in 1906–1909. She performed on stages such as Théâtre des Capucines, Théâtre des Mathurins, Porte Saint-Martin and Théâtre Michel.

=== Achievements in aviation ===
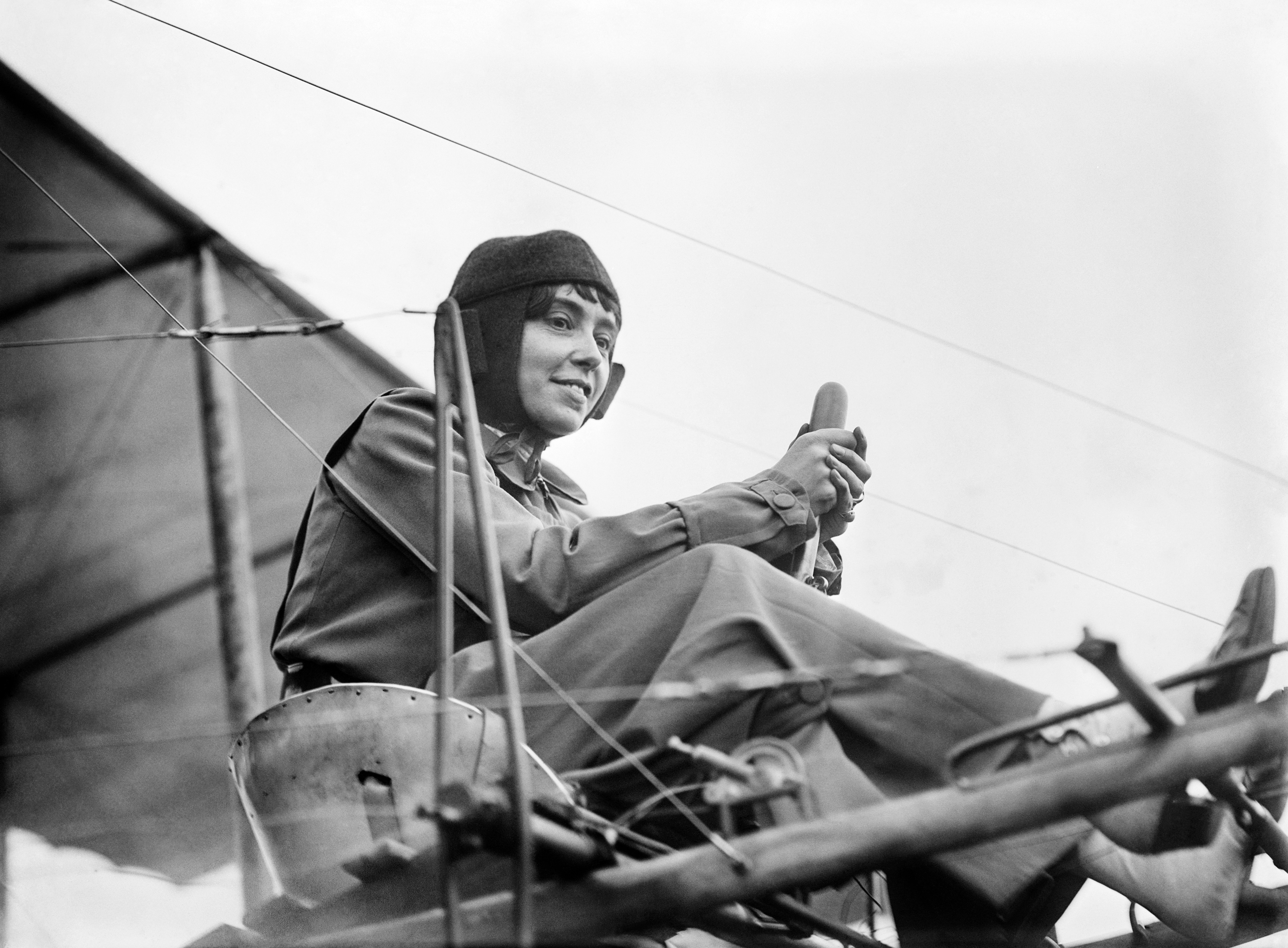
Hélène Dutrieu in her aeroplane, c. 1911

Dutrieu learned to fly using a Santos-Dumont Demoiselle monoplane in early 1910. On 19 April 1910 she reputedly became the first female pilot to fly with a passenger. On 25 November 1910 Dutrieu became the fourth woman in the world, and the first Belgian woman, licensed as an aeroplane pilot, receiving Aéro-Club de Belgique (Aero Club of Belgium) licence #27. Her appearances at air shows earned her the nickname the "Girl Hawk". There was a minor scandal early in her aviation career when it was revealed to the press that she did not wear a corset while flying.

She was also style-conscious, wearing the first known high fashion pilot suit, designed by the Paris couturier Bernard et Cie. In September 1910 Dutrieu flew non-stop from Ostend to Bruges, Belgium. From 26 September to 1 October she flew, frequently carrying passengers, at the aviation week in Burton-upon-Trent, England. She was the first woman pilot to stay airborne for more than an hour and on 21 December 1910 she became the first winner of the Coupe Femina (Femina Cup) for a non-stop flight of 167km in 2 hours 35 minutes. In 1911 she regained the Coupe Femina temporarily with a flight of 254km in 2 hours 58 minutes but that year's cup was eventually won by Marie Marvingt. Dutrieu was a member of the Aéroclub féminin la Stella, a women's flying club set up by Marie Surcouf in 1909. In September 1911 Dutrieu travelled to the United States with her Farman III biplane. She competed for the women's altitude record and the Rodman-Wanamaker trophy, subsequently won by Matilde Moisant, at the Nassau Boulevard airfield meeting in Garden City, New York. In the same year Dutrieu beat 14 male pilots to win the Coppa del Re (King's Cup) in Florence, Italy. In 1912 she became the first woman to pilot a seaplane. Later the same year she won a prize in competition against four other seaplane pilots, including Réne Caudron, at Ouchy-Lausanne, Switzerland. In 1913 Dutrieu became the first woman aviator awarded membership of the Légion d'honneur (French Legion of Honour). She was also award of the Order of Leopold (Belgium).

=== World War I and afterward ===
During World War I Dutrieu became an ambulance driver. Général Février put her in charge of the ambulances at Messimi Hospital. She later became the director of Campagne à Val-de Grâce military hospital. After the war she became a journalist. In 1922 she married Pierre Mortier and took French nationality. She later became vice president of the women's section of the Aéro-Club de France (Aero Club of France). In 1956 she created the Coupe Hélène Dutrieu-Mortier (Hélène Dutrieu-Mortier Cup) with a prize of 200,000 francs for the French or Belgian female pilot who made the longest non-stop flight each year.

=== Death ===
Hélène Dutrieu died in Paris, France, on 26 June 1961, at the age of 83.

== Awards ==
- 21 December 1910, won the Aéro-Club de France's (Aero Club of France) Coupe Femina (Femina Cup).
- 1913, named a member of the légion d'honneur (French Legion of Honour).
- Order of Leopold (Belgium).

== Tributes ==
Her memory is celebrated through various tributes :

- 2006, a patera on Mars was named after her.
- 2011, her memory was honored with a Belgian euro commemorative coin.
- 2022, a giant effigy of her was created by Dorian Demarcq for the Maison de la Marionnette (Puppet House) in Tournai.
- 2024, a street in Brussels was named after her.

== See also ==
- List of ambulance drivers during World War I
- Marie Marvingt
