= Aeronautique Club de France =

The Aeronautique Club de France (ACDF) is an aeronauts then airmen and airwomen French association created on October, 20th 1897 by Jules Saunière.

Having evolved into a Flying Club, it is based on Meaux-Esbly airfield (ICAO: LFPE).
