= Sara Payne Hayden =

American aviator (1919–2019)

Sara Payne Hayden (August 29, 1919 – March 15, 2019) was one of the women who joined the Women Airforce Service Pilots during World War II. An organization that had women ferrying airplanes to free up men to join the army. She was the Veterans Affairs chairwoman of the group as of 2006. Hayden died in Plano, Texas in March 2019 at the age of 99.

== WASP ==
Known as Sara Payne and born in Granite Falls, North Carolina, she graduated from King's Business College in Charlotte, North Carolina, at 15 years of age. Working as a Secretary when the United States entered WWII, she volunteered her time to the “…Civil Defense Program in the “plotting room” and learned aircraft identification.” After watching a newsreel showcasing women flying airplanes to support the war effort, her goal was to fly. Payne worked to get her pilot license, gaining the thirty-five hours required to apply to the Women Airforce Service Pilots (WASP). During her aviation cadet examination, the doctors would tweak her height and weight, causing her height to be under the minimum requirement being 64 inches (5 feet 3 inches) and 110 pounds.“A telephone call to Morris Field produced the information that the doctors did not know of the minimum height requirement and knocked off ½” so I would meet the weight (I was 3 pounds light). They encouraged me to request a recheck, saying there must be a mistake.” This height difference would hinder her application process, halting it for another year until she entered the class of 44-10, graduating and earning her wings. Payne would be based at Randolph Air Force Base in San Antonio, Texas, where she would ferry AT-6s and BT-13s.

== WAC ==
After the disbandment of the WASP program on December 20, 1944, Payne continued to stay at Randolph base with other senior officers and engineers “. . . which meant that we took the AT-6's up and slow timed them for an hour to make sure that the after repair - - [stayed fixed] after the repair.” Sara returned to Charlotte, North Carolina, and pursued her commercial pilot license and instructor rating before working as an instructor at the Charlotte, North Carolina Airport. By 1949, Payne was commissioned while working at a cotton mill in North Carolina. She continued working until she was recalled in 1951 to active duty as a recruiter for the Women's Army Corps. She would go on to transfer to Louisiana, back to Charlotte, and then to Nashville, Tennessee, where she became head recruiter.

== WMA ==
In 1978, a small group of WASPs, including Bee Haydu, Sara Hayden, Betty Nicholas, Marty Wyall, and Dedie Deaton, formed the Women Military Pilots Association (WMPA). The WMPA's mission was originally to organize for women military pilots to come together for the community. In July 1980, the WMPA held an election for president, Vice President, Treasurer, and board members. Sara was elected president and held the position until 1983. During her presidency, the WMPA expanded to incorporate the newer generation of women military aviators. By 1982 the WMPA members would meet in Boston to welcome the newer members to the association. The Association would change its name to Women Military Aviators, Inc. (WMA) to include all women who flew in the military, even the aircrew.

== Awards ==
- In recognition of her significant contributions, Sara Payne Hayden was awarded the prestigious Congressional Gold Medal in 2010. This is the highest congressional award a civilian can receive, a testament to the impact of her work as a WASP.
