= Dorothy Davis =

Dorothy Davis may refer to:

== Actresses ==
- Dorothy Davis (1897–1993), Canadian actress, founder of Montreal Children's Theatre
- Dorothy Davis (American film actress) (born 1914), in Night Fright etc.
- Dorothy Patrick Davis (1921–1987), American model and actress best known as Dorothy Patrick

== Writers ==
- Dorothy Davis (1917–1995), British author of A History of Shopping
- Dorothy Salisbury Davis (1916–2014), American crime fiction writer

== Others ==
- Hope Temple (Dottie Davis, 1859–1938), Irish songwriter and composer
- Dorothy Spiers (born Dorothy Davis, 1897–1977), British actuary
- Dorothy Davis (murder victim) (1920–1995), Australian murder victim
- Dorothy C. Davis (born 1932), American horse breeder, based in Florida, owner of Timely Writer
- Dorothy Hilliard Davis (1917–1994), American pilot and a member of the Women Airforce Service Pilots
- Dorothy Davis Locanthi (born Dorothy N. Davis) (1913 – 1999) American astronomer
- Dorothy Davis (high jumper) (born 1915), American high jumper, 3rd at the 1935 USA Outdoor Track and Field Championships

== Characters ==
- Dorothy Davis, played by Janet Carroll in Henry Winkler's 1988 comedy-drama film Memories of Me

== See also ==
- Dorothy Davies (disambiguation)
- Davis (surname)
