= Barbara London =

Barbara London may refer to:

- Barbara London (curator), American art curator
- Barbara Erickson London (1920–2013), military pilot in World War II
