= Dedie Deaton =

Leni Leoti "Dedie" Deaton (born Clark on September 2, 1903 - February 11, 1986) was the Chief Establishment Officer for the Women's Flying Training Detachment (WFTD), which would later be known as the Women Airforce Service Pilots (WASP) during World War II. Deaton was in charge of securing living quarters for the pilots and other day-to-day functions for the organization. Deaton was a lifelong Red Cross volunteer and stayed involved with WASP activities after the group was disbanded.

== Biography ==
Deaton was born Leni Leoti Clark in Hereford, Texas, on September 2, 1903. In 1915, she and her family moved to Wichita Falls, Texas. Her father, Randolph Lee Clark, founded Wichita Falls Junior College which would become Midwestern State University. Deaton graduated from Wichita Falls High School. Deaton met her husband, Clifford Deaton, at church when she was 16. They were married on July 22, 1922, and together had one son. Deaton also attended both Tarleton College and Texas Womans' University.

After the United States entered World War II, an assistant to Jackie Cochran suggested that Deaton would be a good fit for administrative work with the Women's Flying Training Detachment (WFTD), which would later be known as the Women Airforce Service Pilots (WASP). Deaton was interviewed by Cochran in November 1942 for an executive position, known as the Chief Establishment Officer. She was chosen and given the task of onsite management for the program under Cochran. Deaton was responsible for organizing and implementing the civilian contract for the WFTD and later the WASP. This included securing living quarters for recruits first in Houston and later in Sweetwater, Texas, on Avenger Field. When the WASPs were disbanded in December 1944, Deaton was also responsible for helping to close down the program.

Deaton was on the committee of the Order of Fifnella and organized the 30 year reunion of the WASP at Sweetwater in 1972. Deaton continued as a Red Cross volunteer well into the 1970s. Deaton started the first Red Cross blood bank in Wichita Falls and also began that city's water safety courses. She earned the Order of the Golden Whale in 1973 for working on water safety and teaching people to swim.

Deaton died on February 11, 1986, in Wichita Falls Hospital. She was buried in Wihcita Falls' Riverside Cemetery.
