= Elizabeth Magid =

American fighter pilot and writer

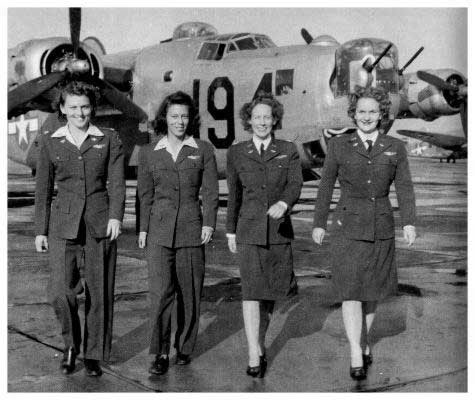
WASP pilots: (left to right) Eloise Huffines Bailey, Millie Davidson Dalrymple, Elizabeth Magid, Clara Jo Marsh Stember, c. 1943.

Elizabeth 'Kit' Magid (née MacKethan, c. 1918 - 23 March 2004) was an American fighter pilot and writer. She was one of 1,074 women in the Women Airforce Service Pilots (WASP). After the death of her best friend and fellow pilot in a B-25 crash, Magid wrote the poem Celestial Flight, which became a staple at funerals for female pilots. Magid's son, Ken, created the PBS documentary Women of Courage about WASPs, their missions, and their second-class treatment by the U.S. military.

== Biography ==
Magid served as a WASP from 1942 to 1944. She trained in Sweetwater Dam Naval Outlying Landing Field with fellow pilot Marie Mitchell Robinson and was stationed in Cochran Field, Georgia, while Robinson was stationed at the Victorville Air Force Base in California. On October 2, 1944, Robinson was killed in a B-25 crash; Magid wrote Celestial Flights while awaiting a transport plane to Robinson's funeral.

After WASP disbanded in late 1944, Magid worked as an administrative assistance in the White House where she met and married her husband, Col. Louis Magid, who also served in the U.S. Air Force and died in 2002. Magid went on to become a freelance writer for a number of publications, such as Boys’ Life and Family Circle, as well as an awarded practitioner of ikebana.

Magid is one of a small handful of WASP members to be buried at Arlington National Cemetery. Prior to 1977, WASP members were not considered military personnel and were denied military funerals; 38 WASPs were killed in accidents during their training or on the job. In 2015, army officials reversed the decision and forbade WASPs from being buried at Arlington; the decision was overturned by a bipartisan bill signed in 2016 by President Obama.
