= Mildred Inks Davidson Dalrymple =

American military aviator

- Born: Mildred Inks; February 14, 1920
- Died: November 14, 2012 (aged 92)
- Burial place: City Cemetery, Llano, Texas
- Other name: Mildred Davidson
- Education: The University of Texas at Austin
- Occupation: Air Force pilot
- Spouses: Bill Davidson; Edwin Dalrymple
- Children: Three
- Parents: Roy Banford Inks (father); Myrtle Louise Moss (mother)

Mildred Inks Davidson Dalrymple (1920–2012) was an American military aviator during World War II as a Women Airforce Service Pilot (WASP) and later became a public speaker, recounting her flying adventures on behalf of the U.S. Air Force. The WASP received the Congressional Gold Medal as a group for their service.

== Biography ==
Mildred Inks, known as "Millie," was born on February 14, 1920, to Roy Banford Inks and Myrtle Louise Moss. Millie was a tiny newborn, weighing just over three pounds, and was placed in "an improvised incubator—a shoe box with a lamp."

She graduated from The University of Texas at Austin, majoring in journalism, and then accepted an editing job with the Texas legislature. She married bomber pilot Bill Davidson in 1942 and took the name Millie Davidson, but he was soon shot down and killed on a military mission over the North Sea during World War II.

=== WASP ===
Millie reacted to her loss by taking flying lessons at Doc Haile’s airport in Austin, Texas, and after only 11 days, she took her first solo flight. She applied to the Women Airforce Service Pilots (WASP) training program on November 5, 1943, and was accepted. She reported to Avenger Field near Sweetwater, Texas, for seven months of intensive flight training in the Class 44-W-4 as one of 1,830 female applicants. Only 1,074 women in the class eventually completed the program, becoming the first American women to fly military aircraft.

Millie graduated on May 23, 1944, when she not only received her silver WASP wings, but she also "accepted the Air Medal for her husband who had given his life for his country only a short time before."

Like other WASP, her primary missions were to fly noncombat military missions in the United States to allow male Air Force pilots to go overseas for combat missions. In the course of her military flying time, Millie would pilot a wide range of aircraft, including bombers, and complete a range of missions including transport, weather, target towing, ferrying, maintenance checkout and other tasks. According to de Wind,

She flew an amazing number and variety of military aircraft, including B-17s, C-45s, BT-13s, AT-6s and the venerable B-24 "Liberator" bomber, an aircraft Millie says, she "usually flew for four or five hours after repairs to make sure they were ready for combat service."

=== Life in Texas ===
When the war ended and Millie returned to civilian life, she married a friend from Llano, Texas, Edwin Dalrymple, who flew a Spitfire fighter during the war. She took the name Millie Dalrymple and the couple had three children.

Later in life, she became a popular public speaker who would describe her adventures as a pilot during the war.

She died peacefully on Wednesday, November 14, 2012, at the age of 92, and was buried in City Cemetery, Llano.

=== Congressional Gold Medal ===
As a member of WASP, Dalrymple was awarded the Congressional Gold Medal for her service. The Congressional Gold Medal is the "highest and most distinguished award Congress can award to a civilian." The ceremony took place in Emancipation Hall of the U.S. Capitol Visitor Center, Washington, D.C., on March 10, 2010. For the occasion, a single gold medal was struck, which is held by the Smithsonian Institution. At the ceremony, every attending WASP as well as family members of a deceased pilot received a bronze duplicate medal.

== Works ==
- Dalrymple, M. I. D. (2009). Millie's milestones. Austin, TX.

== See also ==
- Women Airforce Service Pilots
