= Barbara Erickson London =

American aviator

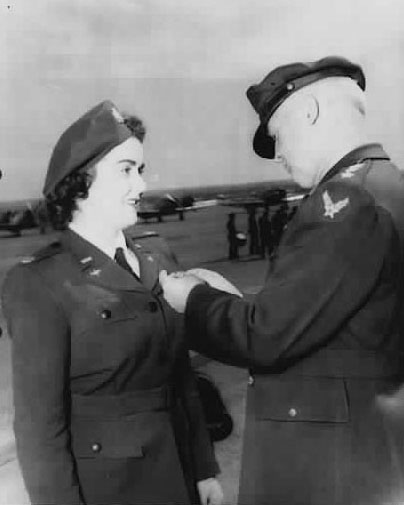
- Barbara Erickson receiving a medal in 1944
- Born: July 1, 1920; Seattle, Washington
- Died: July 7, 2013 (aged 93); Los Gatos, California
- Spouse: Jack London Jr.
- Awards: Air Medal, Congressional Gold Medal
- Aviation career
- Air force: Women's Auxiliary Ferrying Squadron

Barbara Erickson London (July 1, 1920 – July 7, 2013) was a Women Airforce Service Pilot (WASP) and a member of the Women's Auxiliary Ferrying Squadron (WAFS). She was a ferry pilot – picking up and delivering various military aircraft to and from factories and airbases throughout the United States. She became the only woman to win the Air Medal in World War II.

== Early life ==
London was born on July 1, 1920, in Seattle, Washington. In 1940 at the University of Washington in Seattle, she enrolled in the Civilian Pilot Training program, while working at Boeing on B-17s. She soon became a flying instructor, flying sea planes as well as land planes. Approximately one woman was admitted for every ten men to this program. Her mother was very supportive of her decision to fly.

== World War II ==
At the start of World War II, London joined the Women's Auxiliary Ferrying Squadron which was later called Women's Airforce Service Pilots, a program which delivered military aircraft across the country. At 22 years old, London was the youngest of them all. She was the 14th one to join. Her first mission was in late October 1942. London and five other women were given the task to deliver Piper Cubs from Delaware to an aircraft factory in Pennsylvania in order to prove to the Army that they could fly airplanes. London along with the others succeeded in this mission. Another mission London flew was with the five other women and seventeen male pilots in delivering several PT-17s. They each took a plane from Montana to fly and deliver to an airbase in Tennessee. On the second day, London and the rest of the women had arrived at the airbase while the majority of the men had not. This proved to the Army that women were not only capable of flying, but could fly larger planes. In 1943, she became commanding officer of the Long Beach 6th Ferrying Group at Daugherty Field and the program was renamed to the Women Air-force Service Pilots. In one ten-day period in 1943, London flew a total of 8,000 miles. For these accomplishments, she was awarded the Air Medal.

London was moved to an Army airbase in Long Beach, California, and became a squad commander and was there along with Cornelia Fort, Evelyn Sharp, Barbara Towne, and Bernice Batten. She took many long trips from this base of picking up and delivering planes. She once left her base in California to deliver a plane in New Jersey. "They sent me up to Buffalo. I picked up an airplane there and delivered it to Montana. They sent me from there to Kansas City, where I picked up another plane and took it to Alabama, which put me on the East Coast, and so they sent me up to Long Island for another plane that I took back to California. I was gone a month—with one change of clothes!" Female pilots like London typically carried a small bag of clothes due to a lack of room in the planes they flew.

In March 1944, London became the only woman who had received the Air Medal after flying 8,000 miles. These 8,000 miles consisted of four separate 2,000 mile trips flown in just five days during the summer of 1943. She first delivered a DC-3 from her base in California and flew it to base in Fort Wayne, Indiana. She then picked up a P-47 Thunderbolt at that base and delivered it to California. Then she picked up a P-51 Mustang and delivered it back to Fort Wayne. Finally, she picked up another P-47 Thunderbolt and took it back to her airbase.

London made her final trip on December 19, 1944, from Long Beach to Sacramento, California, delivering a P-61. She was then picked up by military transport and brought back to Long Beach.

== Later life ==
London married Jack London Jr. in April 1945, who was also a pilot. Her daughter, Terry London Rinehart, became an airline pilot. Her grandson, Justin Rinehart is a captain at United Airlines. Both granddaughters are also pilots as well.

After the war, London wanted to continue to fly, but she was turned down by airlines that forwarded her stewardess applications instead.

Barbara London ran a flight school and charter service, and later worked at the Long Beach Airport. She also assisted in the founding of the All Woman Transcontinental Air Race and the Long Beach chapter of the Ninety Nines.

In 2010, London received the Congressional Gold Medal.

She died on 7 July 2013, in Los Gatos, California.
