= Verneda Rodriguez =

American aviator

Verneda G. Rodriguez McLean (January 11, 1918 – March 19, 1982) was an American aviator and served in the Women Airforce Service Pilots (WASP) during World War II. She is the first WASP to be buried with full military honors in Arlington National Cemetery.

== Biography ==
Rodriguez McLean was born in a South Chicago colonia on January 11, 1918 to Danish and British Guyanese parents. Rodriguez McLean attended a teacher's college in Chicago after she graduated high school.

Rodriguez McLean began flying in the summer of 1943. Prior to joining the Women Airforce Service Pilots (WASP) in 1944, she worked as a meteorologist at the Chicago Municipal Airport. She graduated in WASP class 44-W-6. She was assigned to Moore Field in Mission, Texas after her WASP graduation where she worked towing flight targets. After the WASP was disbanded in December 1944, she went back to Chicago where she again worked in the weather service for some time. Later, she was hired to do data analysis on aircraft accidents at Langley. It was at Langley where she met and later married her husband, Edward Ridley McLean, who had also been a pilot in WWII. She traveled the world with her husband and became a proficient Oriental brush painting artist, showing her work in the United States. In the 1970s, she worked to fight for veterans rights for former WASP pilots.

Rodriguez McLean died on March 19, 1982. She was the first WASP to be buried in Arlington National Cemetery.
