= Elizabeth Strohfus =

American aviator

Elizabeth "Betty" Wall Strohfus
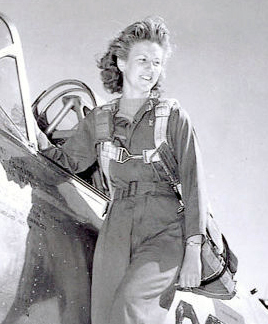
- Born: November 15, 1919; Faribault, MN, US
- Died: March 6, 2016 (aged 96); Faribault, MN, US
- Occupation: Pilot
- Military career
- Allegiance: United States
- Branch: United States Army Air Corps

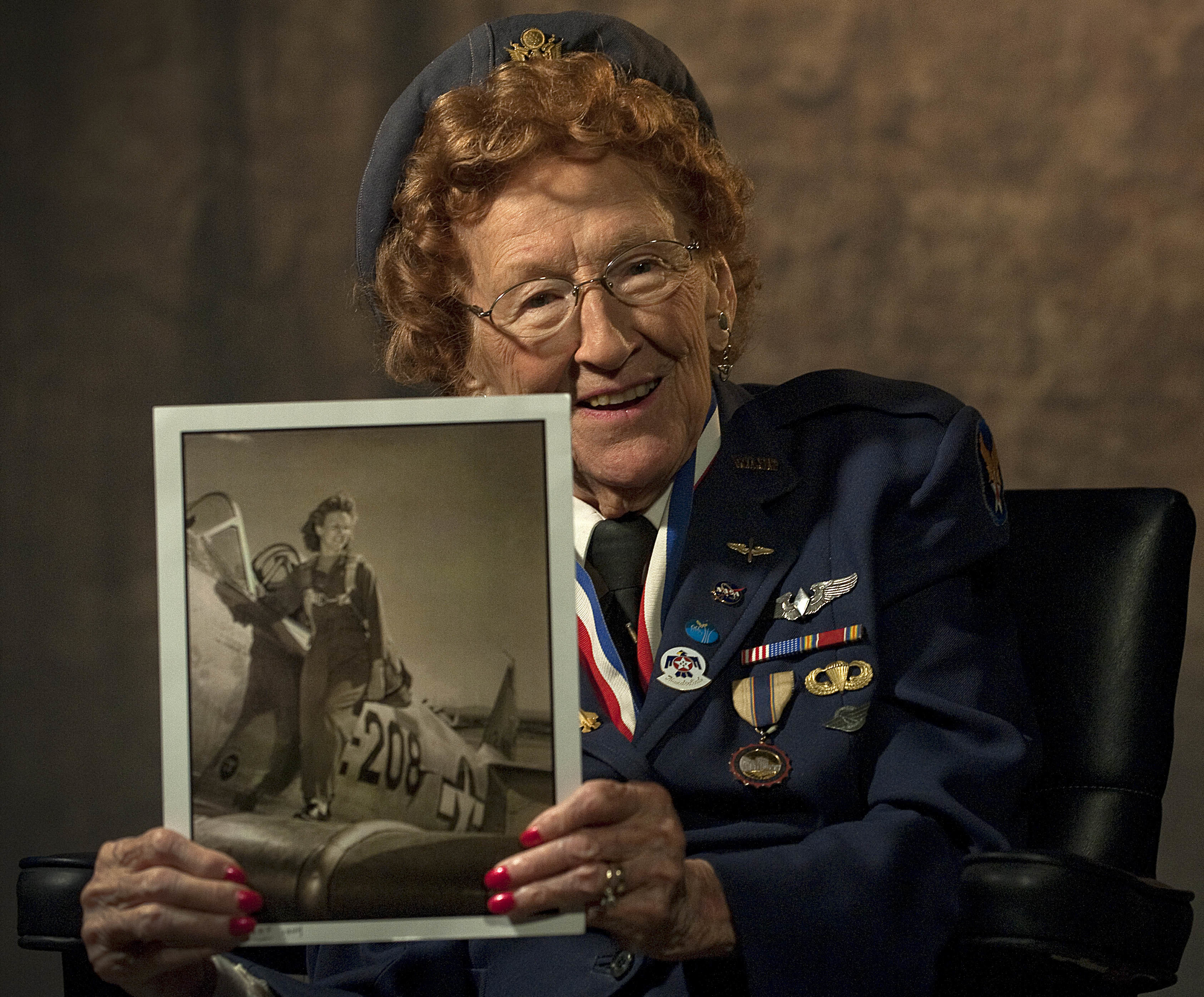
Betty Wall Strohfus holds a picture of herself when she was a WASP pilot (2012)

Elizabeth Wall Strohfus (November 15, 1919 – March 6, 2016) was an American aviator and pioneering member of the Women Airforce Service Pilots (WASP) during World War II.

== Early life ==
Strohfus was born on November 15, 1919, in Faribault, Minnesota, the fifth of her parents' six children. She graduated high school in 1937 and worked at the Rice County Courthouse in the Register of Deeds office. After meeting a member of the local Sky Club, an all-male aviators club, Strohfus borrowed $100 from a local bank, utilizing her bicycle as collateral, and joined. She worked as a Sky Club volunteer in exchange for a chance to fly. Her first flight was in a Piper Cub.

== Military career ==
Strohfus was one of just 1,074 female pilots to earn silver wings for the WASPs. She joined the WASPs in 1943 and trained in Sweetwater, Texas. She flew noncombat missions from 1943 to 1944, often ferrying military planes throughout the United States. She trained male air and infantry gunners at Las Vegas Army Airfield in 1944.

Strohfus was the recipient of two Congressional Gold Medals for her service in the WASPs and was inducted into the Minnesota Aviation Hall of Fame. She was believed to be one of the last surviving WASP aviators.

The WASPs were disbanded on December 20, 1944.

== Later life and legacy ==
Following the end of the WASPs, Strohfus applied to become a pilot at Northwest Airlines. She was rejected because they did not hire women to fly commercially. Instead, she became an air traffic controller but found the job lonely.

She then moved back to Faribault, where she married and had five children. She worked at the courthouse, volunteered with the Cancer Society, and was active with the American Legion. After her mother and sister both died of cancer, Wall worked for the American Cancer Society in New York from 1972 to 1979.

Strohfus travelled to Washington D.C. to advocate for WASPs receiving veteran status, which was finally granted in 1977.

Strohfus began speaking about her experience as a member of WASP and a female aviator beginning in the 1980s. In 1991, she became one of the first women to pilot an F-16 when she was 71-years old. Strohfus later flew as a passenger for a 4.5 Gs acrobatic plane ride when she was 95 years old. She spoke at events ranging from a 1997 banquet for Northwest Airlines, schools and universities, clubs, museums, and more and in 2015, she had shared her story in 31 states. The Experimental Aircraft Association named an AT6, Strohfus's favorite aircraft in the service, after Wall.

Strohfus died from complications from a fall at the Milestone Senior Living Center in Faribault, Minnesota, on March 6, 2016, at the age of 96.

On June 24, 2017, the field at the Faribault Municipal Airport was renamed the "Liz Wall Strohfus Field" in her honor.
