= Betty Tackaberry Blake =

American pilot (1920– 2015)

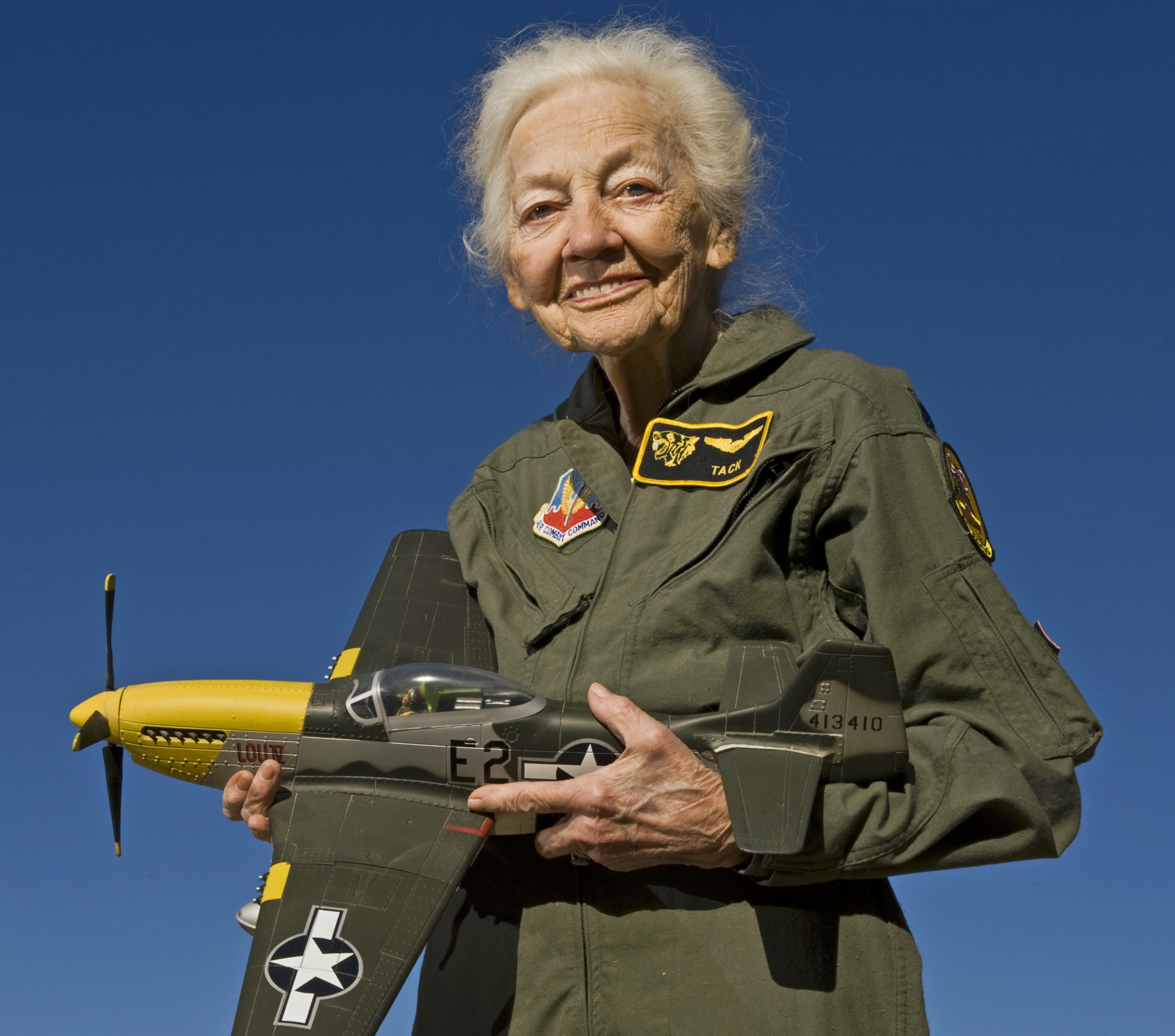
- Blake in 2012 with a model of the P-51 Mustang, her favorite aircraft of the 35 types she flew
- Born: October 29, 1920; Honolulu, Territory of Hawaii
- Died: April 9, 2015 (aged 94)
- Military career
- Allegiance: United States
- Branch: United States Army Air Forces
- Service years: 1942–1944
- Unit: Women's Airforce Service Pilots

Betty Tackaberry "Tack" Blake (née Guild; October 29, 1920 – April 9, 2015) was the last surviving member of the first training class (Class 43-W-1 at Sweetwater, Texas, on April 24, 1943) of the Women Airforce Service Pilots paramilitary aviation service. The WASPS flew aircraft ferrying/delivery missions, towed aerial targets, and some even participated in flight testing and evaluation of advanced jet and rocket-powered aircraft. In performing these missions, the woman effectively replaced male pilots, who could be utilized in combat roles.

== Biography ==
Betty C. Guild was born in Honolulu, in pre-statehood Hawaii, to Archibald Smith Guild and Edna Violet Winnifred (Wilson) Guild. She had two brothers. She earned her pilots license through the Civilian Pilot Training Program at the University of Hawaii. She was a civilian inter-island tour/ferry pilot in Hawaii in 1941.

She witnessed the December 7, 1941 Japanese Imperial Navy sneak attack on Pearl Harbor from her family's home overlooking the harbor. She had been scheduled to fly that morning, but her passenger had cancelled the day before. Betty's fiancé, Robert Tackaberry, was a naval ensign assigned to the USS California, but was with Betty at the time it was sunk. Betty's father helped Tackaberry get back to his ship, though they had to hide in the Pearl Harbor gatehouse until the second raid ended. Tackaberry and Betty were then later married by the navy chaplain who penned "Praise the Lord and Pass the Ammunition", a popular wartime phrase/song.

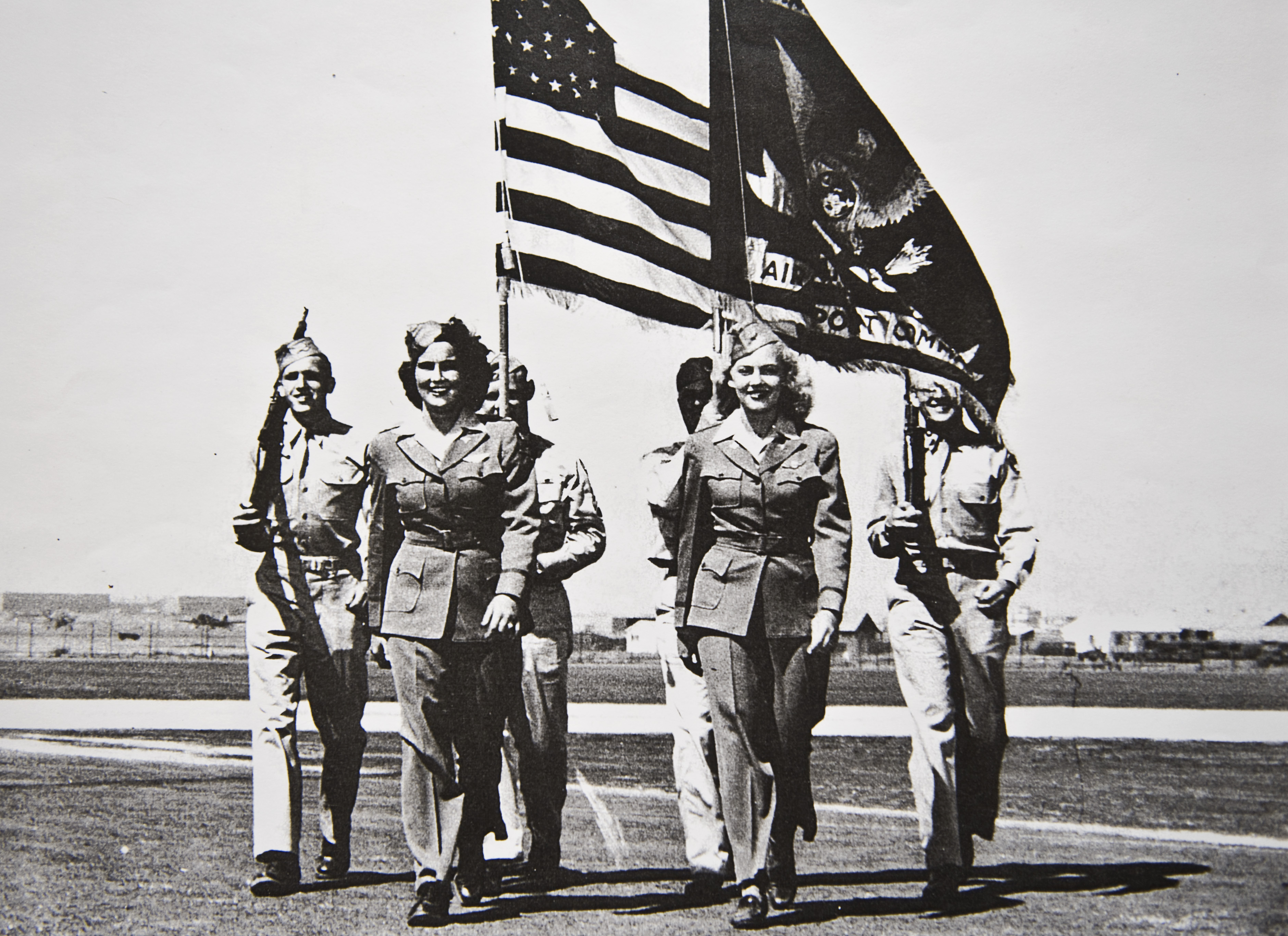
Betty Tackaberry (right) at March Field, 1943

A few months after the Pearl Harbor attack, she was recruited by Jackie Cochran into the effort to form the WASPs. Betty was initially turned down for training because of lack of flying hours. During her service, she flew all types of fighters, bombers, and other aircraft from factories to the East Coast for trans-Atlantic delivery, 36 types of aircraft in all. She said her favorite aircraft was the North American P-51 Mustang.

== After WWII ==
After the war, Betty and Robert Tackaberry divorced. She subsequently married US Air Force pilot George Blake. They moved to, and built the first house in Paradise Valley, Arizona, and had three sons who all became pilots.

Her book, High on Life; Rebel, WASP, was supposed to have been published in December 2007 but publication was postponed.
