= Madge Moore =

American aviator (1922–2016)

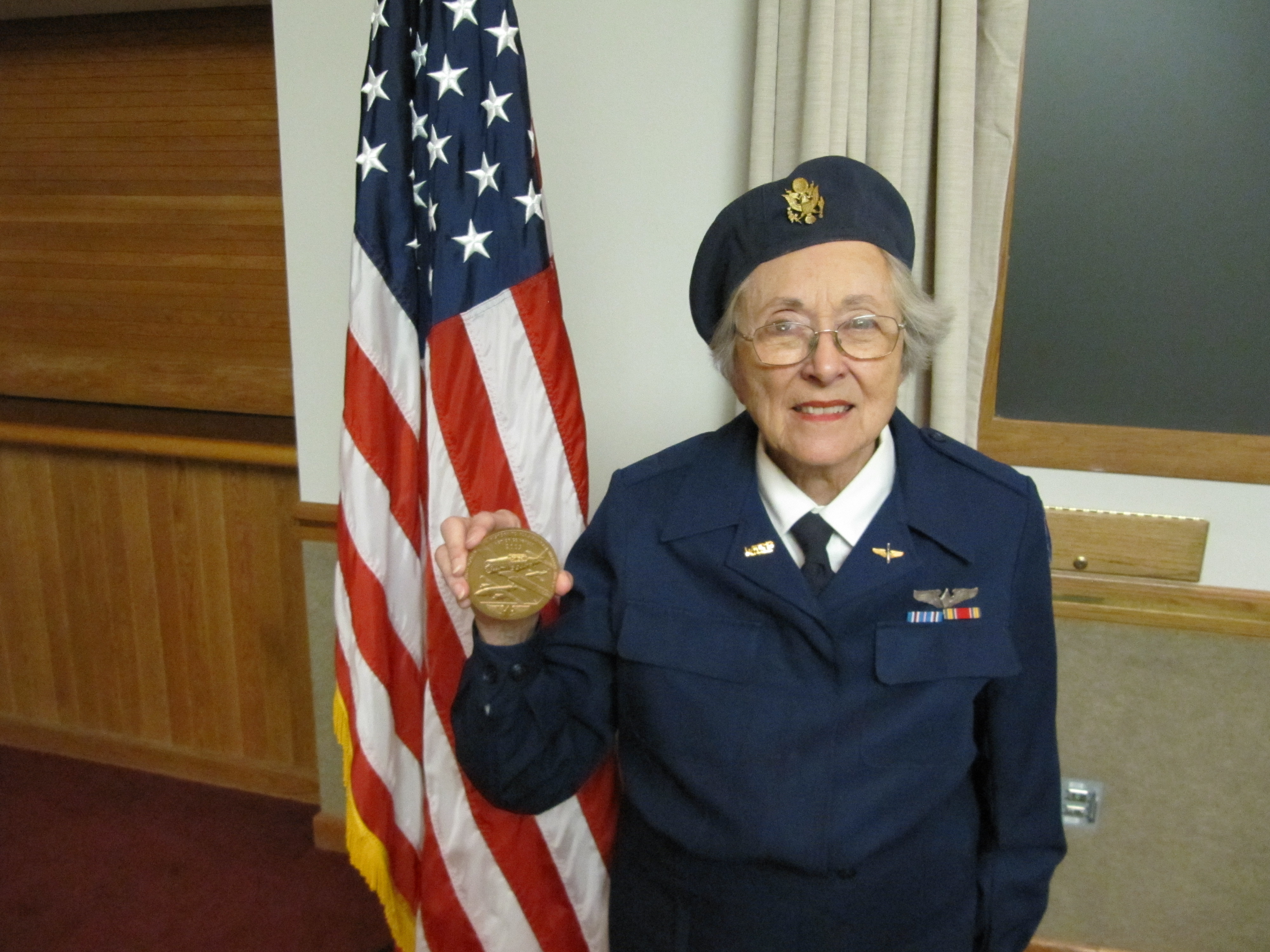
Madge Moore with her Congressional Gold Medal in 2010.

Madge Leon Moore (January 22, 1922 – December 22, 2016) was an American aviator. She served in the Women Airforce Service Pilots (WASP) during World War II. Moore ferried planes during the war and after the dissolution of WASP, lived as a homemaker. She received the Congressional Gold Medal for her service in 2010.

== Biography ==
Moore was born in Rule, Texas and was raised in Haskell, Texas. Moore went to Haskell High School. Moore's early flight instruction included learning to trust the airplane itself. She recalled that her flight instructor told her "to take her hands and feet off the controls" so that she could see that the plane would stay in the air on its own. One of her first flight passengers was her mother. Moore graduated from Southern Methodist University and attended Texas State College for Women.

She began training in the Women Airforce Service Pilots (WASP) on November 1, 1943, at Avenger Field. Her parents, who supported her desire to serve, drove her to training. She graduated from her WASP training on May 23, 1944. Moore was stationed at Perrin Field. As a WASP, she ferried planes, some of which no longer had functioning instruments, forcing her to use dead reckoning. Many of the planes she flew were from Kelly Field, which was closing and she most often ferried BT-13s and AT-6s. She also tested planes after they were repaired.

Moore married Captain Stanley L. Moore in 1945 and the couple settled in Sherman, Texas where Stanley was stationed. She went on to live as a homemaker and stay at home mother.

In 2010, she was awarded the Congressional Gold Medal for her service as a WASP.
