= Ann Warren Griffith =

American writer (1918–1983)

Ann Warren Griffith (June 3, 1918 - May 11, 1983) was an American writer of humorous essays and science fiction.

== Early life ==
Ann Gilman Warren was born in Newton, Massachusetts, in 1911 or 1918 (sources vary on this date). She attended Barnard College.

== Career ==
During World War II, she was a member of the Women Airforce Service Pilots (WASP) program, graduating from flight school in August 1944. After the war, she worked for the Red Cross running a canteen at Wildflecken, an experience she wrote about for The New Yorker.

Griffith wrote for The New Yorker, The American Mercury, The Atlantic, and Pegasus (an aviation magazine). Her comic magazine pieces – with titles like "How to Make Housework Easy the Hard Way" and "Gentlemen, Your Tranquilizers are Showing" – were collected in Who Is Hiding in my Hide-a-Bed? (1958). "Ann Warren Griffith must surely be the wackiest of writers ever to set a salty witticism down on paper," began one review of this compilation. She also wrote about television and advertising in syndicated newspaper articles.

Griffith wrote at least two stories in the science fiction genre: "Zeritsky's Law" (Galaxy Science Fiction 1951) and "Captive Audience" (The Magazine of Fantasy and Science Fiction 1953). Both stories have been included in several anthologies since publication. "Captive Audience" is a satire about overwhelming advertising on mobile devices, appliances, and packaging, and the desperate search for spaces without constant commercial messages.

== Personal life ==
Ann Warren married after World War II. Ann Warren Griffith died in 1983, in her sixties or early seventies. In 2016 her story "Captive Audience" was reissued in French, as a monograph.
