= Gloria Heath =

American aviator

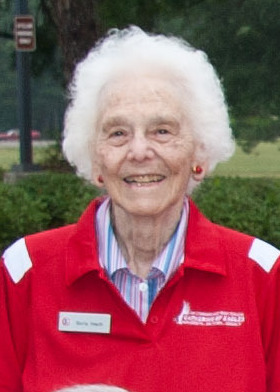
- Heath in 2012
- Born: Gloria Whitton Heath; May 7, 1922; New York City, New York, U.S.
- Died: December 16, 2017 (aged 95)

Gloria Heath (May 7, 1922 – December 16, 2017) was an American flight safety pioneer who was a founding member of the Flight Safety Foundation and served as the head of the International Academy of Astronautics Space Safety Committee.

== Early life and education ==
Heath was born in New York, graduating from The Putney School in 1939 and from Smith College in 1943. Heath first flew in a plane at age four, sharing an interest in flying with her older brother Royal. At Smith, Heath majored in education and child studies, wrote for the newspaper, played on the national women's lacrosse team, and was the president of the Smith College Flying Club. Prior to Heath's presidency, Smith Flying Club members learned about the theory of flying but not its practice. In 1941, Heath persuaded the fifteen other members of the Flying Club to purchase a plane for $100 each. Club members used this plane, which they painted black and christened The Bird of Paradise, to practice flying at LaFleur Airport in Northampton, Massachusetts.

== Career ==
=== Pilot ===
Heath joined the Women Airforce Service Pilots, the first group of American women to fly military aircraft, upon graduating from Smith. As a WASP, Heath flew B-26 bombers used for target practice at Grissom Air Reserve Base in Indiana. She earned the rank of second lieutenant. After World War II ended in 1945, the WASPs were dissolved, and Heath began working in the field of aviation safety. In 1947, Heath became the head of the Engineering for Safety Group in the newly formed Flight Safety Foundation. Heath spent two decades working in flight safety, becoming the assistant director for the Cornell-Guggenheim Safety Center in 1965 and founding her own search and rescue consulting company SAR-ASSIST in 1968.

Heath's career took a different turn when she was asked to become the chairman of the International Academy of Astronautics Space Safety Committee in 1972. Heath's contributions that focused more on earthbound disasters and aiding downed spacecraft ultimately led to both the development of the current satellite-based search and rescue system and the United Nations declaration of an International Decade for Natural Disaster Reduction.

=== Lacrosse ===
Heath joined the U.S. Women's Lacrosse Team as a goalie in 1941. After her war service ended, Heath made the U.S. Reserve Team in 1949 and 1950 and the U.S. first team in 1954. From 1951 to 1954, Heath was the president of the United States Women's Lacrosse Association.

== Awards and honors ==
- 1965: Barbour International Air Safety Award
- 1971: Smith College Medal
- 1990: Engineering Sciences Award of the International Academy of Astronautics
- 1995: Lifetime Achievement Award of the Women in Aerospace
- 1999: Inducted into Women in Aviation International
- 2000: President's Award of Flight Safety Foundation
- 2001: Listed as one of the 100 most influential women in aviation
- 2006: Inducted into the National Lacrosse Hall of Fame
- 2010: Congressional Gold Medal
