= Adela Riek Scharr =

American aviator (1907–1998)

Adela "Del" Riek Scharr (August 10, 1907 – March 11, 1998) was an American aviator. Scharr was the first woman in St. Louis to earn her commercial flight license and worked as a flight instructor at Lambert Field. Scharr was recruited in 1942 to join the Women's Axillary Ferrying Squadron (WAFS) and later flew planes as a WASP. Scharr was also the first woman to fly a P-39 Bell Aircobra. After World War II, Scharr was commissioned as a major in the Air Force and also worked as a teacher.

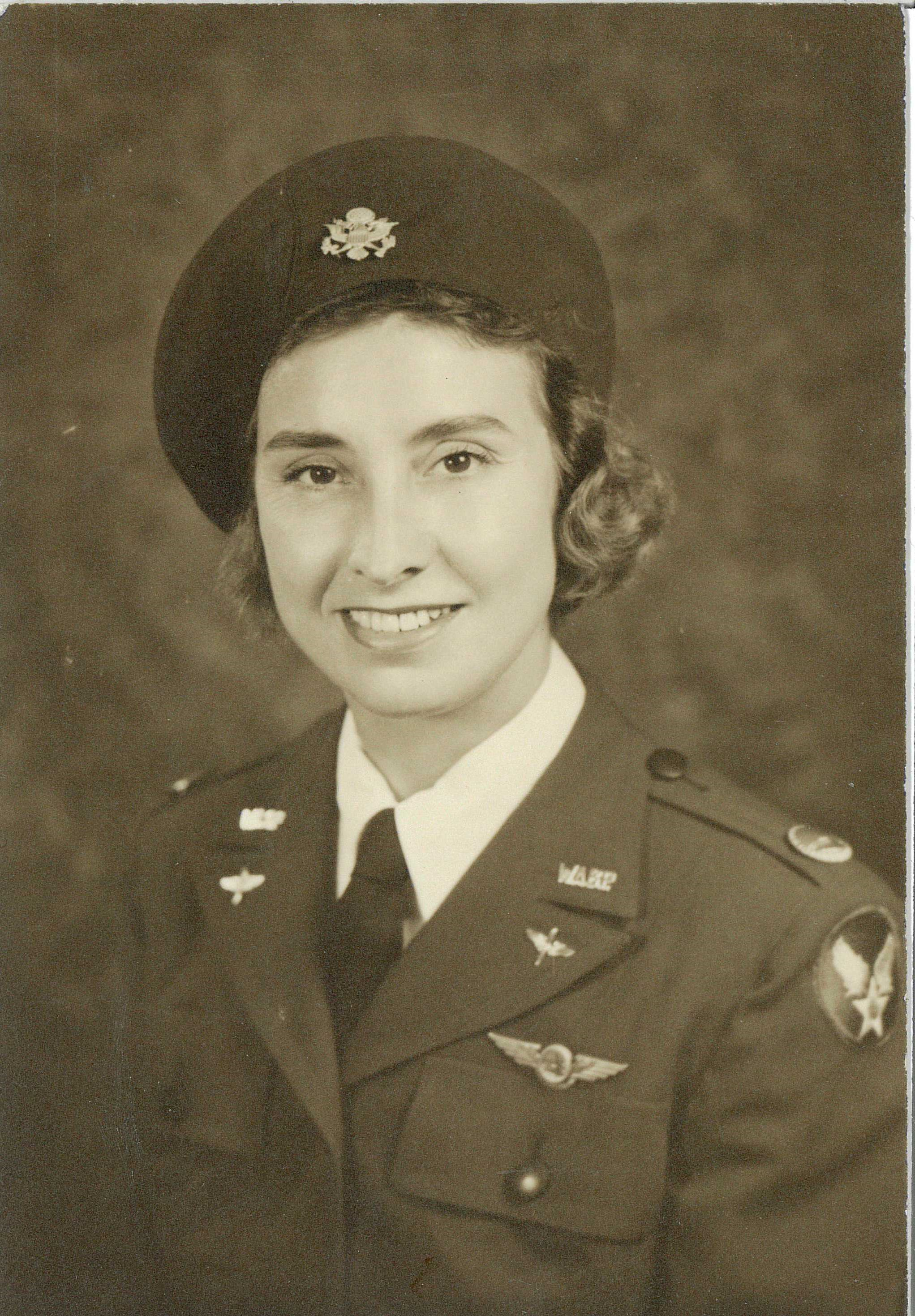
Adela Riek Scharr

== Biography ==
Scharr was born and raised in St. Louis. She earned her bachelor's degree from Harris Teachers College (now Harris-Stowe State College) in 1929. While she was at college, she began to become interesting in flying. She started teaching in elementary schools in St. Louis after college. In 1934, she earned her master's degree in education from the University of Missouri at Columbia. Scharr started flying in 1935. In 1938, she was working as a flight instructor at Lambert Field, where she met her husband, Harold N. Scharr. The couple married in 1939 and she was forced to quit teaching after she married. In 1940, Scharr became the first woman to earn her commercial license at Lambert Field. After she was forced out of teaching public school, she went on to teach at the Civilian Pilot Training Program at St. Louis University.

In 1941, Scharr was part of a "Powder Puff Squadron" to repel enemy aircraft that people felt might be able to make their way inland. Scharr joined the Women's Axillary Ferrying Squadron (WAFS) in 1942. By the time she was invited to join, she had 1,429 of flight time. She worked with Nancy Love and was part of the first squadron sent to Romulus Army Air Base where newly built aircraft were both inspected and refueled. Love put her in charge of WAFS at the Romulus initially, though later, Love removed Scharr from Romulus and Scharr reported to the 2nd Ferrying Group in Wilmington. When the WAFS became the WASP, she continued to fly and ferry military planes. She was asked to join the WASP in 1943 and made up the first group of women who joined. She was the first woman to fly a P-39 Bell Aircobra. Scharr flew the P-39 from Montreal to Los Angeles and had been prepared to fly by watching a short film and reading the instruction booklet for the plane.

In 1948, she became an officer of the Ninety-Nines. Scharr received a commission from the Air Force in 1949, where she joined as a major. She also returned to teaching around the same time, after the law forbidding married women from teaching was lifted. In 1961, she flew a C-135 jet for the Air Force to prove that women could fly that type of aircraft. Scharr retired from the Air Force Reserves in August 1967. She retired from teaching in St. Louis in 1972.

Scharr died on March 11, 1998, after a long illness.

== Bibliography ==
- Sisters in the Sky: The WASP. St. Louis: Patrice Press. 1997. ISBN 9780935284553.
- Sisters in the Sky: The WAFS. St. Louis: Patrice Press. 1987. ISBN 9780935284461.
