= Rosa Charlyne Creger =

American aviator

- Born: December 24, 1918; Noble, Oklahoma, U.S.
- Died: January 1, 2005 (aged 86); Shreveport, Louisiana, U.S.
- Known for: Member of WASP during WWII; Chief of the Anesthesia Department at Earl K. Long Hospital

Rosa Charlene Creger (December 24, 1918 – January 1, 2005) was a WASP pilot during World War II, and became the Chief of the Anesthesia Department at Earl K. Long Hospital in Baton Rouge, Louisiana after the war.

== Early life ==
Creger was born on December 24, 1918, to Charles and Rosa Creger, in Noble, Oklahoma. She was the fourth of six children and graduated from high school in Norman, Oklahoma, afterwards she worked as a professional dancer for Catherine Duffy's Productions in Oklahoma City, continuing on to become a professional model for Kickerknick Lingerie with plans to become a designer. Her first flight was with renowned aviator Wiley Post in 1927 when she was eight years old as part of a contest to collect bread wrappers.

== Military service ==
Creger received her WASP flight training at Avenger Field in Sweetwater, Texas, and graduated in the final WASP class (44-W-10) in W 10-Flight I on December 7, 1944. She began her training in class 44-W-8, but was held back due to illness. Because there were no medical facilities at the training location in Sweetwater, Creger was transferred—along with trainees Mary Shaw and Laura Rutledge—to the hospital at Big Spring Army Air Field, under the care of Dr. Weldon W. Stephen. Creger later used this experience to help in lobbying for militarization of women who served as WASPs so that they could gain veteran benefits, which was granted on November 23, 1977 after a unanimous Senate vote.

During World War II she served as a pilot and an engineering test pilot at Waco Army Air Field. Retired U.S. Air Force Col. Steve dePyssler remembered Creger as a pilot for "every type of aircraft there was" and "She flew B-17's, B-24's -- everything." After World War II the WASPs were disbanded and Creger entered nursing school and continued to serve during the Korean War.
