= Lorraine Rodgers =

WASP pilot (1920–2018)

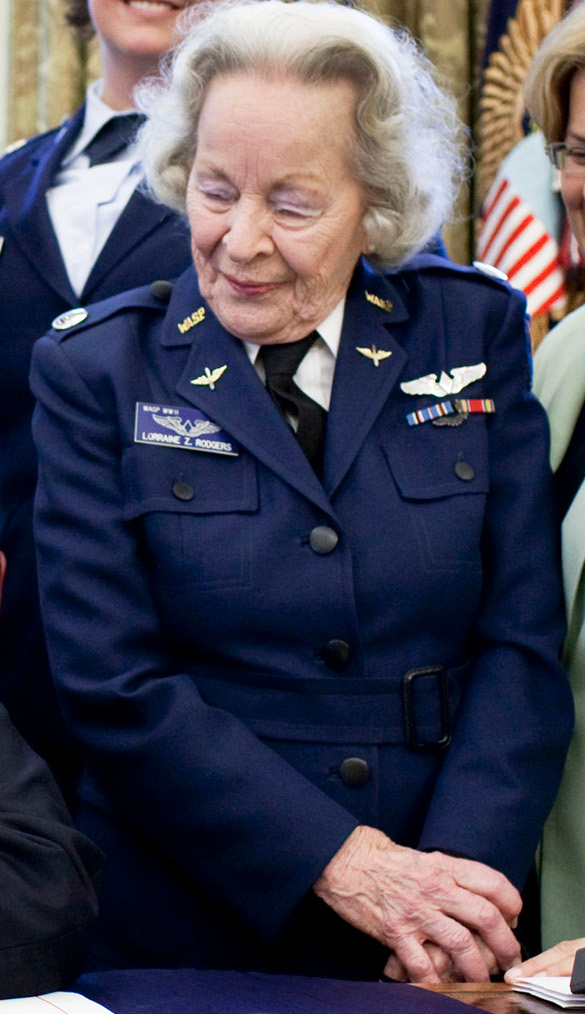
- Lorraine Rodgers in 2009
- Born: Lorraine Zillner; September 11, 1920; Park Ridge, Illinois, U.S.
- Died: July 3, 2018 (aged 97); Alexandria, Virginia, U.S.
- Spouse: George Franklin Rodgers
- Aviation career
- Air force: Women's Auxiliary Ferrying Squadron
- Rank: 1Lt

Lorraine Zillner Rodgers (September 11, 1920 – July 3, 2018) was a Women Airforce Service Pilots (WASP) pilot for the United States Army Air Forces.

== Background ==
Born Lorraine Zillner in Park Ridge, Illinois, she went on to graduate from the University of Illinois and began working in the office of Chicago's Douglas Aircraft facility. Fascinated with aircraft since childhood, she would spend her free time on the factory floor, admiring the C-54 Skymasters being produced there. After a test pilot took her for a ride in one, she began weekend flying lessons in a Piper J-3 Cub.

== WASPs ==
Once the United States committed its involvement in World War II and male pilots were being called to serve, the WASP program was created for domestic support. Zillner had read that interviews for women with pilot licenses were being held for the experimental program. Despite not having a license and, initially, only eight of the 35 required hours of flight time, she was accepted for training two weeks later via telegram from the Department of the Army.

Zillner began six months of classroom and flight training in September 1943 at Avenger Field in Sweetwater, Texas. After graduating in February 1944, she reported for duty with the 5th Ferrying Group at Dallas Love Field. On December 20, 1944, General Henry H. Arnold dissolved the WASP program and Zillner was honorably discharged.

== Personal life ==
Upon returning to Illinois, Zillner began working at Naval Air Station Glenview and met George Franklin Rodgers, a naval aviator. They were later married for 33 years, until his death shortly after retiring. She relocated to the original grounds of Mount Vernon in Alexandria, Virginia, and lived there until her death at age 97 on July 3, 2018.

== Media ==
In the TV show Legends of Airpower, Rodgers life is covered in Season-4.
