= Women Airforce Service Pilots =

U.S. Army Air Corps female auxiliary pilots

Women Air Service Pilots (WASP)
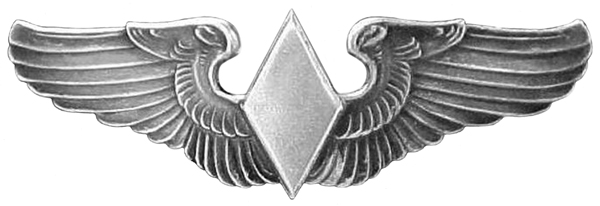
- The WASP badge

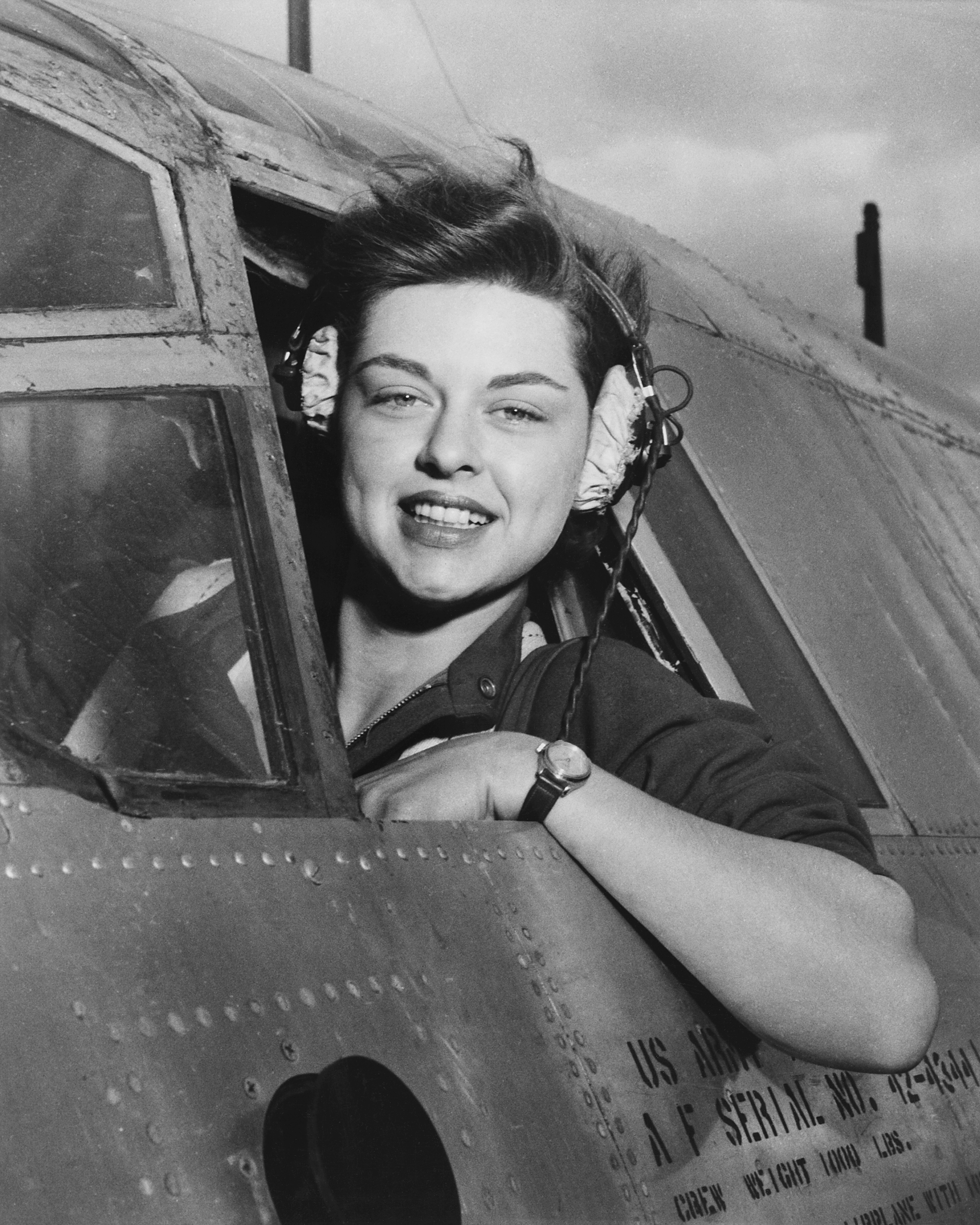
- Elizabeth L. Gardner, WASP member, at the controls of a Martin B-26 Marauder

Agency overview
- Formed: August 5, 1943
- Preceding agencies: Women's Flying Training Detachment (WFTD), formed September 1942; Women's Auxiliary Ferrying Squadron (WAFS), formed September 1942
- Dissolved: December 20, 1944
- Employees: about 2,500 accepted for training 1,074 completed training
- Parent agency: United States Army Air Forces

The Women Airforce Service Pilots (WASP; also Women's Army Service Pilots or Women's Auxiliary Service Pilots) was a civilian women pilots' organization, whose members were United States federal civil service employees. Members of WASP became trained pilots who tested aircraft, ferried aircraft and trained other pilots. Their purpose was to free male pilots for combat roles during World War II. Despite various members of the armed forces being involved in the creation of the program, the WASP and its members had no military standing.

WASP was preceded by the Women's Flying Training Detachment (WFTD) and the Women's Auxiliary Ferrying Squadron (WAFS). Both were organized separately in September 1942. They were pioneering organizations of civilian women pilots, who were attached to the United States Army Air Forces to fly military aircraft during World War II. On August 5, 1943, the WFTD and WAFS merged to create the WASP organization.

The WASP arrangement with the US Army Air Forces ended on December 20, 1944. During its period of operation, each member's service had freed a male pilot for military combat or other duties. They flew over 60 million miles; transported every type of military aircraft; towed targets for live anti-aircraft gun practice; simulated strafing missions and transported cargo. Thirty-eight WASP members died during these duties and one, Gertrude Tompkins, disappeared while on a ferry mission, her fate still unknown. In 1977, for their World War II service, the members were granted veteran status, and in 2009 awarded the Congressional Gold Medal.

== Creation of the WASP ==
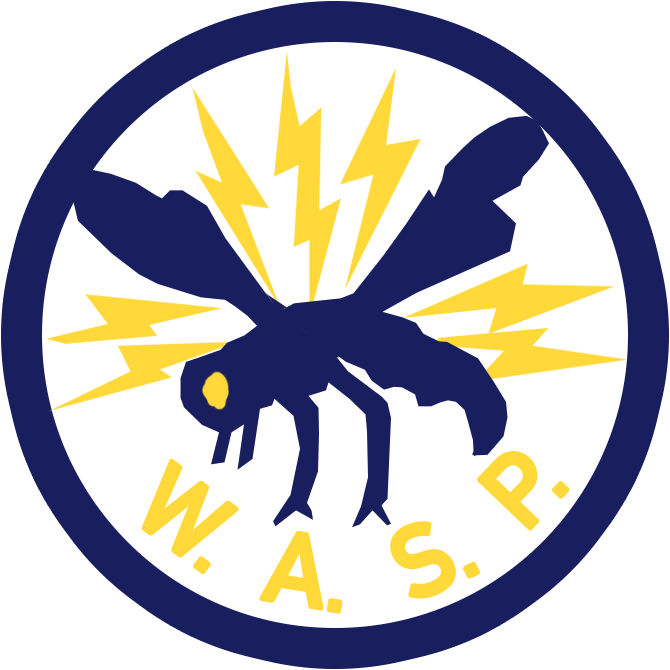
WASP Patch (unofficial)

WASP started out as two separate organizations. Pilot Jacqueline "Jackie" Cochran wrote to the First Lady, Eleanor Roosevelt, in 1939 to suggest the idea of using women pilots in non-combat missions. Cochran was introduced by Roosevelt to General Henry H. Arnold, chief of the Army Air Force, and to General Robert Olds, who became the head of the Air Transport Command (ATC). Arnold asked her to ferry a bomber to Great Britain in order to generate publicity for the idea of women piloting military aircraft. Cochran did go to England, where she volunteered for the Air Transport Auxiliary (ATA) and recruited American women pilots to help fly planes in Europe. Twenty-five women volunteered for the ATA with Cochran. The American women who flew in the ATA were the first American women to fly military aircraft. While in England, Cochran studied the organization of both the ATA and the Royal Air Force (RAF).

In the summer of 1941, Cochran and test-pilot Nancy Harkness Love independently submitted proposals to the U.S. Army Air Forces to allow women pilots in non-combat missions after the outbreak of World War II in Europe. The plan was to free male pilots for combat roles by using qualified female pilots to ferry aircraft from the factories to military bases, and also to tow drones and aerial targets. The U.S. was building its air power and military presence in anticipation of direct involvement in the conflict, and had belatedly begun to drastically expand its men in uniform. This period led to the dramatic increase in activity for the U.S. Army Air Forces, because of obvious gaps in "manpower" that could be filled by women. To compensate for the manpower demands of the military after the attack on Pearl Harbor, the government encouraged women to enter the workforce to fill both industrial and service jobs supporting the war effort.

=== WAFS ===
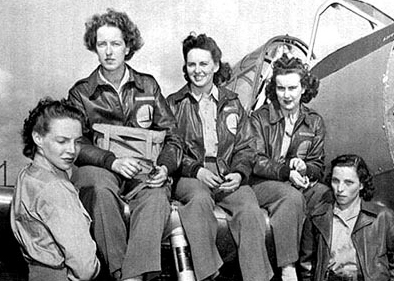
Women's Auxiliary Ferrying Squadron (WAFS) pilots, March 7, 1943

Nancy Harkness Love's husband, Robert Love, was part of the Army Air Corps Reserve and worked for Colonel William H. Tunner. When Robert Love mentioned that his wife was a pilot, Tunner became interested in whether she knew other women who were pilots. Tunner and Nancy Love met and began to plan an aviation ferrying program involving women pilots. More formally, on June 11, 1942, Colonel Tunner suggested putting women pilots into the Women's Army Auxiliary Corps (WAAC). However, there were technical problems with this suggestion, so it was decided to pursue hiring civilian pilots for the ATC instead. By June 18, Love had drafted a plan to send to General Harold L. George who sent the proposal onto General Henry H. Arnold. Eleanor Roosevelt wrote about women working as pilots during the war in her September 1 "My Day" newspaper column, supporting the idea. General George again broached the idea with General Arnold, who finally, on September 5, directed that "immediate action be taken and the recruiting of women pilots begin within twenty-four hours." Nancy Harkness Love was to be the director of the group and she sent out 83 telegrams to prospective women pilots that same day.

The Women's Auxiliary Ferrying Squadron (WAFS) went into operation publicly on September 10, 1942. Soon, the Air Transport Command began using women to ferry planes from factory to airfields. Love started with 28 women pilots, but they grew in number during the war until there were several squadrons. Requirements for recruits were that they had to be between ages 21 and 35, have a high school diploma, a commercial flying license, 200 horsepower engine rating, 500 hours of flight time and experience in flying across the country.

Uniforms for the WAFS were designed by Love and consisted of a gray gabardine jacket with brass buttons and square shoulders. The uniform could be worn with gored skirts or slacks also made of gabardine. Because they had to pay for their own uniforms, only 40 women ever wore the WAFS uniform. All WAFS were issued a flight uniform of khaki flight coveralls, a parachute, goggles, a flying scarf and leather flying jacket sporting the ATC patch.

Headquarters for WAFS was established at the new (May 1943) New Castle Army Air Base (the former Wilmington Airport). Tunner ensured that there were quarters for the women to live in at the base.

WAFS worked under a 90 day, renewable contract. WAFS earned $250 a month and had to provide and pay for their own room and board.

The first group of WAFS recruits were known as the Originals. Betty Gillies was the first woman to show up for training. On October 6, Gillies was made an executive officer and second-in-command of the WAFS. Gillies was familiar with drill and command techniques which she had learned at finishing school. The first WAFS assignment was run by Gillies on October 22, 1942. Six WAFS would ferry six L-4B Cubs from the factory to Mitchel Field. The original squadron of 28 was reduced to 27 when Pat Rhonie left on December 31 after disagreeing with Colonel Baker.

The WAFS had an average of about 1,400 flying hours and a commercial pilot rating. They received 30 days of orientation to learn Army paperwork and to fly by military regulations. Afterward, they were assigned to various ferrying commands. At the beginning of 1943, three new squadrons were formed. The 4th Ferrying Group was in Romulus and commanded by Del Scharr. The 5th Ferrying Group was stationed at Love Field and was under the command of Florene Miller. The 6th Ferrying Group was stationed at Long Beach and commanded by Barbara Jane Erickson.

=== WFTD ===
Cochran returned from England and arrived in the US the day before the announcement of the WAFS. Cochran was angry that Love's proposal had been accepted, while her own had seemingly been ignored. The next day, Cochran flew to Washington, D.C., and confronted General Arnold about her earlier proposal. The WAFS had been formed while General Arnold was out on prolonged medical leave. On September 13, Arnold sent a memo to General George E. Stratemeyer that designated Cochran as the director of "Women's Flying Training." On September 15, 1942, Cochran's training proposal was also adopted, forming the 319th Women's Flying Training Detachment (WFTD). WFTD would be working with the Flight Training Command (FTC). WFTD was conceived of a program to train more women to ferry aircraft. On October 7, General Arnold proposed the goal of training 500 women pilots. By November 3, General Arnold was proposing a "maximum effort to train women pilots."

Fifinella, the Women Airforce Service Pilots (WASP) mascot, created by The Walt Disney Company.

The Aviation Enterprises at Howard R. Hughes Field became the base of the WFTD. The first trainees recruited for WFTD, class 43-1, started on November 16, 1942. Cochran made Dedie Deaton her staff executive and in charge of finding housing for class 43-1- also known as the "Guinea Pigs". Women trained on old planes, many of which bore "visible and invisible scars".

WFTD pilots were issued large khaki coveralls (which the trainees called "zoot suits"), were ordered to wear any shoes they had, and a hairnet on the flight line. The WFTD women were housed in various locations and had to find their own transportation to training. The first deaths occurred when Margaret Oldenburg and her instructor were practicing spins on March 7, 1943. Oldenburg had put her plane, a PT-19 open cockpit, into a spin that she could not recover from and the crash killed her and her instructor. Because the WFTD were civilians, there was no money to cover the funeral costs. Cochran paid for the expense out of her own pocket and Deaton escorted Oldenburg's body home. Another crash took place on March 21, 1943, when Cornelia Fort, a former flight instructor who had been the first to encounter Japanese aircraft at Pearl Harbor, was ferrying a BT-13 with a group of male pilots. One of the pilots, while showing off, flew too close to Fort's plane and his landing gear collided with the wing of her plane, breaking part of it off. The plane went into a nose-dive, killing her. This made her the first female pilot in American history to die while on active duty.

Cochran pushed aggressively for a single entity to control the activity of all women pilots. Tunner, in particular, objected on the basis of differing qualification standards, and the absolute necessity of the ATC being able to control its own pilots. But Cochran's preeminence with Arnold prevailed, and in July 1943 he ordered the programs merged, with Cochran as director. The WAFS and the WFTD were combined to form the Women Airforce Service Pilots (WASP). Love continued with the program as executive in charge of WASP ferrying operations. The formal announcement combining WAFS and WFTD took place on August 20, 1943.

WASP adopted a patch in 1943 that featured the female gremlin Fifinella. Fifinella was conceived by Roald Dahl and drawn by Walt Disney, and became the official WASP mascot.

== Requirements and demographics ==
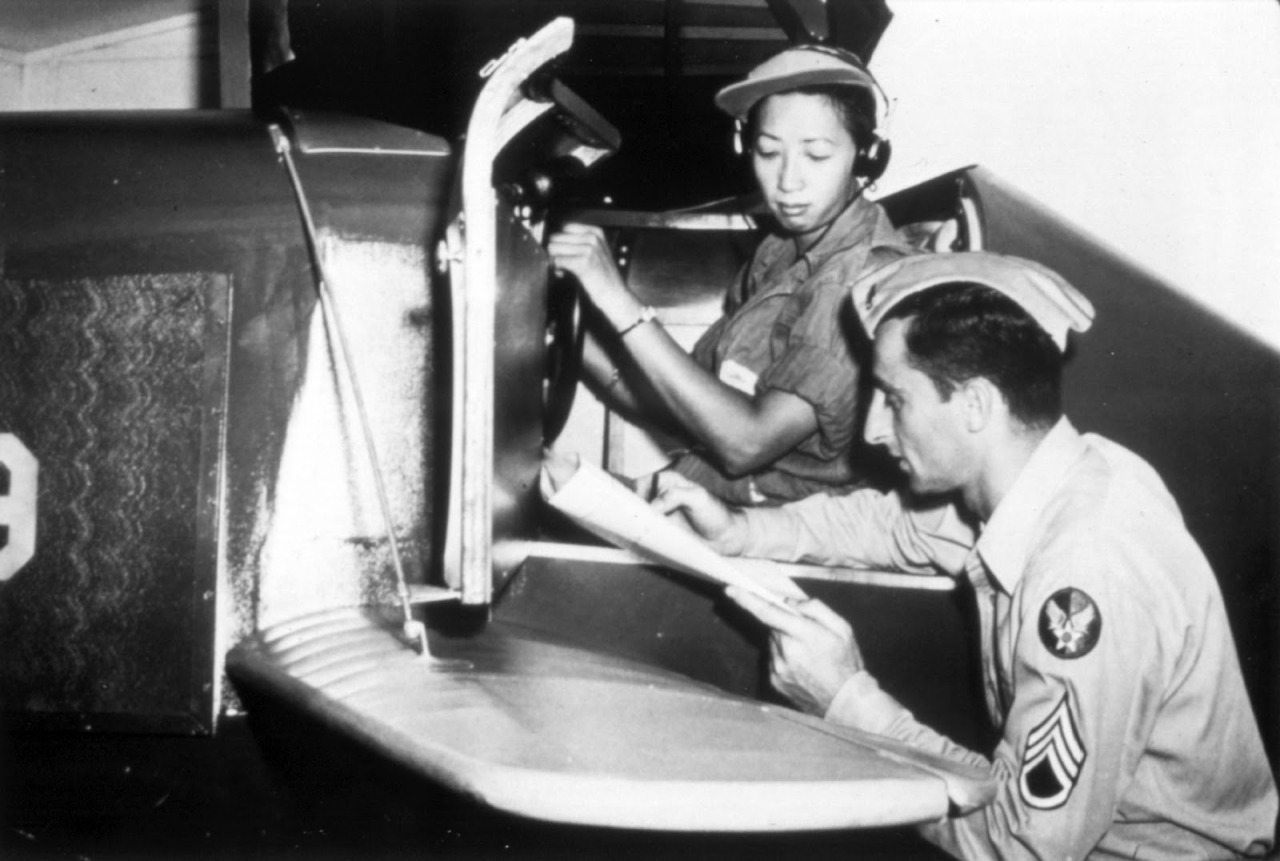
Hazel Ying Lee in a Link trainer, 1944

WASP adopted many of WAFS requirements, but added one other. Recruits still had to be between 21 and 35 years old, in good health, in possession of a pilot's license and 35 hours of flight time. Additionally, women were also required to be at least five feet and two inches tall. Over 25,000 women made application to join the WASP; 1,830 were accepted but only 1,074 completed the training. The applicants all had prior experience and airman certificates. Several WASPs had been trained previously in the Civilian Pilot Training Program (CPTP). Many of the women came from wealthy backgrounds that had afforded pilot training earlier in life, or had husbands who helped pay for their expensive training. All WASP recruits were interested in serving their country.

Although the majority of WASP pilots were white, they were not exclusively so. Two Chinese Americans, Hazel Ying Lee and Maggie Gee, two women of Hispanic descent, Verneda Rodriguez and Frances Dias, and one known Native American woman, Ola Mildred Rexroat completed the training. Rexroat was a member of the Oglala Sioux tribe from the Pine Ridge Indian Reservation in South Dakota. While the total number of black women applicants for WASP training is unknown, several African American pilots made it to the final interview stage, where they were all rejected. Mildred Hemmans Carter, another African American applicant, was asked to withdraw her application because of her race. In 1940, at age 19, Carter had earned a Bachelor of Arts degree from the Tuskegee Institute. The following year, she received her aviation certification. However, because of her sex, Carter was also rejected from flying with the Tuskegee Airmen. Seventy years later, she was recognized retroactively as a WASP, and Carter took her final flight at age 90. Another African American applicant, Janet Harmon Bragg, was told by Cochran in her interview that "it was difficult enough fighting prejudice aimed at females without additionally battling race discrimination."

== WASP training ==
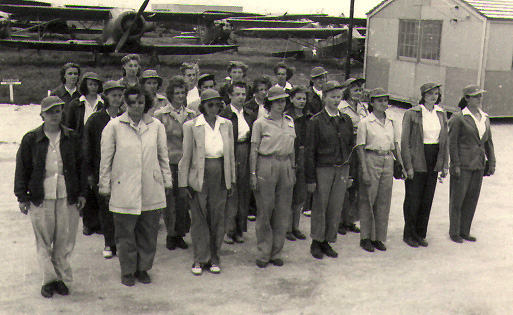
Start of WASP training – class of 43-3 in January 1943. Photo by Lois Hailey.

Short film about the Women Airforce Service Pilots, part of the Army–Navy Screen Magazine film series in 1943

The WASP training spanned 18 groups of women. The first group was the Originals, who were the first group of the Women's Auxiliary Ferrying Squadron (WAFS), led by Nancy Love.

The second group was The Guinea Pigs which were Jacqueline Cochran's first class of women pilots for the Women's Flying Training Detachment (WFTD). The Guinea Pigs started training at the Houston Municipal Airport (now William P. Hobby Airport) on November 16, 1942, as part of the 319th Army Air Force Women's Flying Training Detachment (AAFWFTD). This was just after the WAFS had started their orientation in Wilmington, Delaware. Unlike the WAFS, the women that reported to Houston did not have uniforms and had to find their own lodging. The "Woofteddies" (WFTD) also had minimal medical care, no life insurance, crash truck, or fire truck, and the ambulance was loaned from the Ellington Army Airfield, along with insufficient administrative staff, and a hodgepodge of aircraft—23 types—for training. As late as January 1943, when the third class was about to start their training, the three classes were described by Byrd Granger in On Final Approach, as "a raggle-taggle crowd in a rainbow of rumpled clothing", while they gathered for morning and evening colors. There was also a lack of equipment, such as a Link trainer, that was necessary for training.

The first Houston class started with 38 women with a minimum of 200 hours. Twenty-three graduated on April 24, 1943, at the only Houston WASP graduation at Ellington Army Air Field. The second Houston class, started in December 1942 with a minimum of 100 hours, but finished their training just in time to move to Sweetwater, Texas and become the first graduating class from Avenger Field on May 28, 1943. The third class completed their advanced training at Avenger Field and graduated July 3, 1943. Half of the fourth class of 76 women started their primary training in Houston on February 15, 1943, and then transferred to Sweetwater. Later in the summer of 1943, both the WAFS and WFTD were combined into the WASP. The first group to train as WASP started in Sweetwater in September 1943 and were designated as Class 44-W-2.

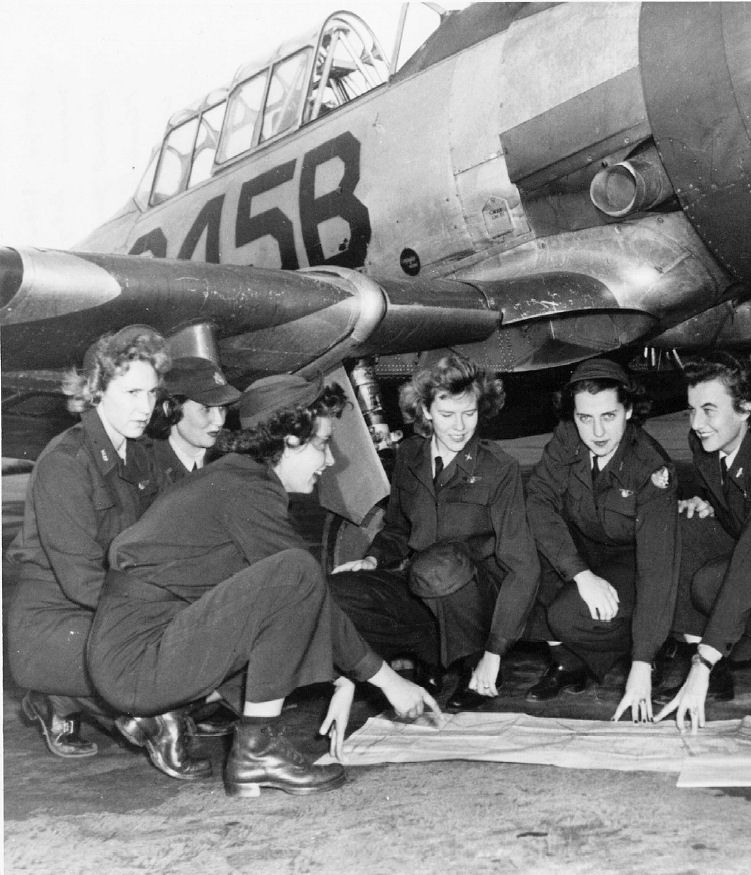
Avenger Field - WASP trainees with T-6 Texan, 1943

Each WASP had a pilot's license, but was retrained to fly the Army way by the U.S. Army Air Forces at Avenger Field in Sweetwater, Texas. More than 25,000 women applied for the WASP, but only 1,830 were accepted into the program. During the course of their training, it was reported that 552 women were released for lack of flying proficiency, 152 resigned, 27 were discharged for medical reasons, and 14 were dismissed for disciplinary reasons. After completing four months of military flight training, 1,074 of them earned their wings and became the first women to fly American military aircraft. While the WASP were not trained for combat, their course of instruction was essentially the same as male aviation cadets. They received no gunnery training and very little formation and aerobatic flying, but went through the maneuvers necessary to be able to recover from any position. The percentage of those eliminated compared favorably with the elimination rate for male cadets' in the Central Flying Training Command.

WASP recruits were required to complete the same primary, basic, and advanced training courses as male Army Air Corps pilots and many of them went on to specialized flight training. They spent around 12 hours a day at the airfield with half the day spent practicing actual flight and the other half studying. By graduation, WASP recruits had 560 hours of ground school and 210 hours of flight training. They knew Morse code, meteorology, military law, physics, aircraft mechanics, navigation and other subjects.

== Duties ==
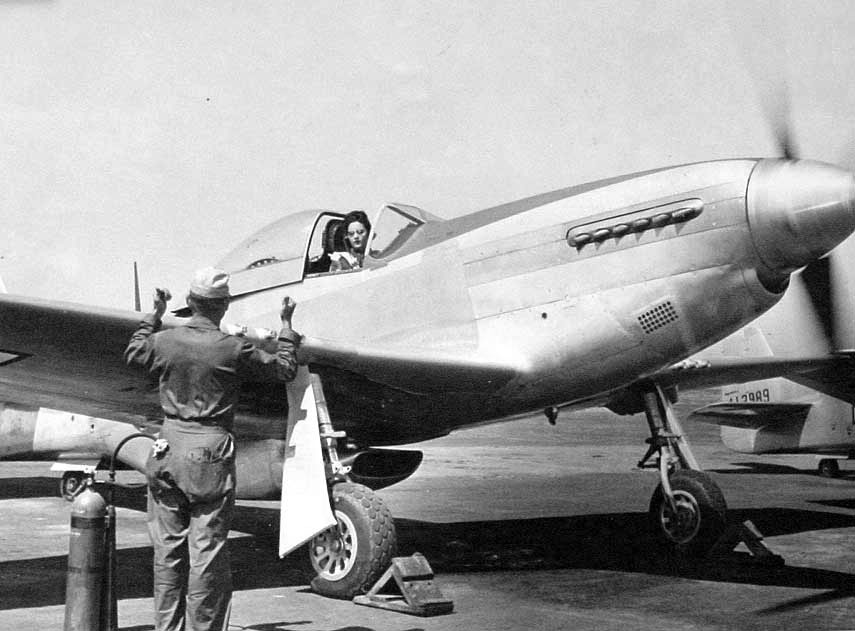
Florene Watson shown preparing a P-51D-5-NA for a ferry flight from a factory at Inglewood, California

After their training, the WASP were stationed at 122 air bases across the U.S., where they assumed numerous flight-related missions. The original WAFS were organized specifically to ferry airplanes and free male pilots, around 900 in all, for combat roles. A WASP would go to the factory, test fly the airplane and then deliver it. During World War II, women pilots flew 80 percent of all ferrying missions. Between September 1942 and December 1944, the WASP delivered 12,652 aircraft of 78 different types. In order to set an example, Nancy Love who was in charge of training, made sure she was trained and qualified on as many different types of planes as was possible.

They also towed targets for live anti-aircraft artillery practice, simulated strafing missions, and transported cargo. The live-target practice was announced by Jackie Cochran on July 19, 1943, to 25 recent WASP graduates at Avenger Field. Cochran told the group that she had a "top secret assignment" and that any WASP could opt out if they wished: none did. This group would be sent to Camp Davis to tow flying shooting targets for men on the ground to practice shooting airborne targets. Many of the planes were shot during this training and several WASP were shot in the feet. Sometimes the planes were shot on purpose, when service men mistakenly believed they were supposed to shoot the plane, not the target the WASP was towing. One of the planes used during target towing, an A-24 that, like many had not been adequately maintained by the Army Air Corps (AAC), killed WASP Mabel Virginia Rawlinson. Rawlinson was practicing night flying with a trainer when her A-24 began to experience technical issues. The instructor asked her to return to the airfield, but on the final approach, Rawlinson's plane connected with the top of a pine tree and the plane nosed down and crashed. The instructor was thrown free, but Rawlinson was stuck in the front seat as the plane went up in flames, unable to open the plane's broken canopy lock. The investigation into the crash and her death found that the towing planes were not maintained properly and the AAC was using the wrong octane fuel for the planes.

The women flew almost every type of aircraft flown by the USAAF during World War II. In addition, a few exceptionally qualified women were allowed to test rocket-propelled planes, to pilot jet-propelled planes, and to work with radar-controlled targets. When men were less willing to fly certain difficult planes, such as the YP-59 and B-29 Super Fortress, General Arnold recruited two WASPs to fly these aircraft. Arnold believed that if men saw women fly these planes successfully, they would be "embarrassed" into taking these missions willingly. Two WASPs, Dorthea Johnson and Dora Dougherty Strother, were chosen to fly the B-29. They flew to Alamogordo in the B-29s where there was a crowd waiting to see them land. General Arnold's plan worked, "From that day on, there was no more grumbling from male pilots assigned to train on and fly the B-29 Super Fortress." Women would also test-fly the planes that had been repaired.

When not flying, the pilots studied navigation, radio communications and new flying skills.

Thirty-eight members lost their lives in accidents: eleven during training, and twenty-seven on missions. Because they were not considered part of the military by the guidelines, a fallen WASP was sent home at family expense. Traditional military honors or note of heroism, such as allowing the U.S. flag to be placed on the coffin or displaying a service flag in a window, were not allowed.

== Request for military status ==
The WASP members were U.S. federal civil service employees, and did not qualify for military benefits. Each member paid for her own transportation costs to training sites, for her dress uniforms and room and board. Although attached to the U.S. Army Air Forces, the members could resign at any time after completion of their training. On September 30, 1943, the first of the WASP militarization bills was introduced in the United States House of Representatives by Representative John Costello. Both Cochran and Arnold desired a separate corps headed by a woman colonel (similar to the WAC, WAVES, SPARS, and the Marine Corps Women's Reserve heads). The War Department, however, consistently opposed the move, because there was no separate corps for male pilots as distinguished from unrated AAF officers. In December 1943, the G-1 division of the General Staff decided that the WASPs should be taken into the existing WAC organization and therefore disapproved the changes made by the Air Staff. This decision was concured in by G-3. In January 1944, Costello introduced a bill, HR 4219, to authorize women's commissions in the Army Air Forces. General Arnold felt that there was room for women and men to work as pilots in the Army Air Forces. He testified in front of the House military committee that the WASP were all "good fliers and that he plans to send all the male pilots to fight."

However, some in the media disagreed with General Arnold and began to write opinion pieces in some of the most important media of the day. TIME, The New York Daily News and the Washington Post all urged women to step down and give the jobs back to men. A journalist, Drew Pearson, questioned the legality of funding the WASP program, and even accused General Arnold of being manipulated by Jackie Cochran's "feminine wiles" in a Washington Times Herald column. The column caused male civilian pilots to increase their efforts to write letters against the program.

== End of the WASP program ==
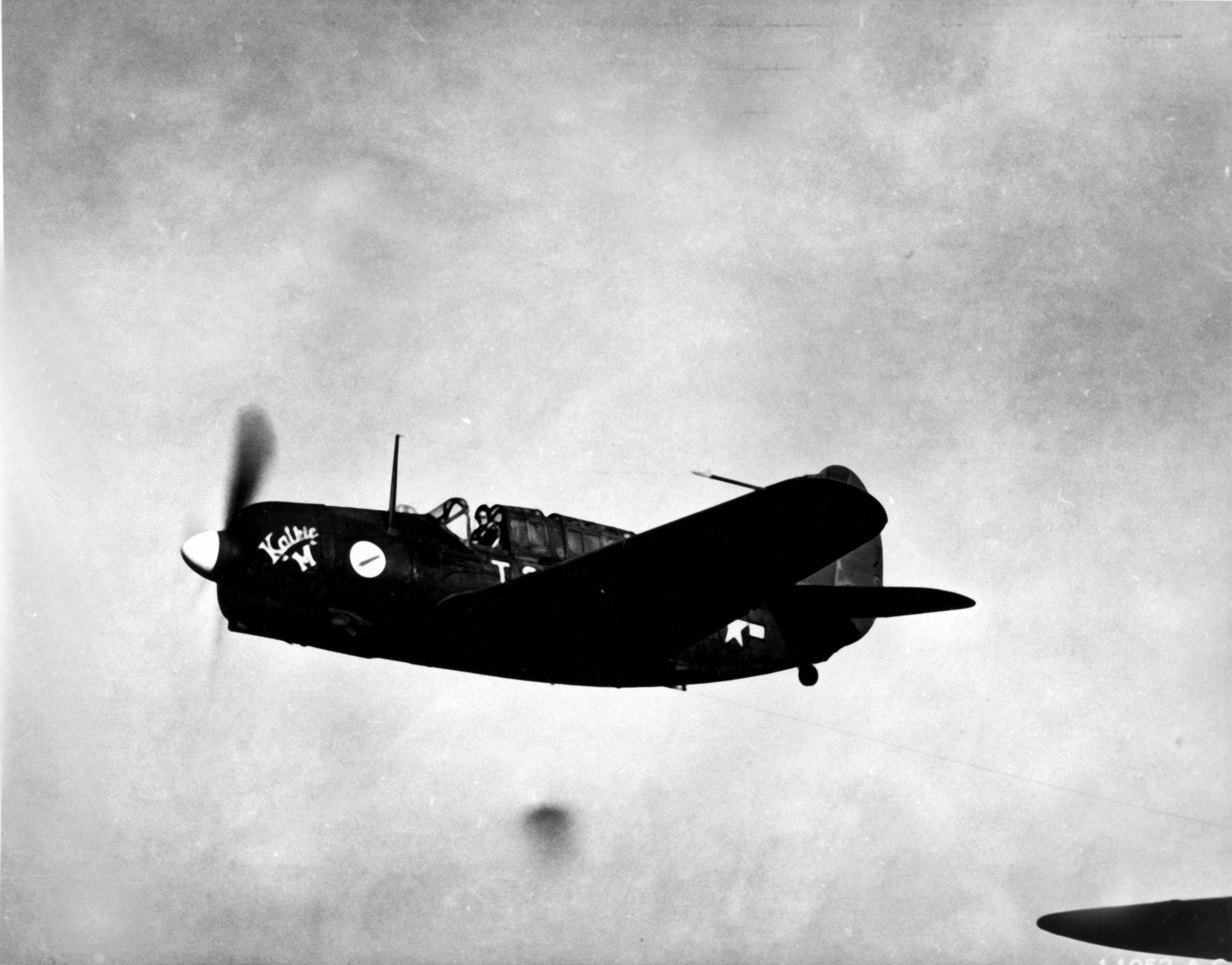
Helen W. Snapp, flying for the Low-target Squadron, at Camp Stewart, Georgia June 1944

On June 21, 1944, the U.S. House bill to provide the WASP with military status, HR 4219, was narrowly defeated 188 against to 169 for. The civilian male pilots lobbied against the bill: reacting to closure of some civilian flight training schools, and the termination of two male pilot training commissioning programs. The House Committee on the Civil Service (Ramspeck Committee) reported on June 5, 1944, that it considered the WASP unnecessary, unjustifiably expensive, and recommended that the recruiting and training of inexperienced women pilots be halted. The committee had found that the program had cost $50 million in government funds. Because of the cost, the program needed to request funding through legislation.

Cochran had been pushing for a resolution of the question: in effect, delivering an ultimatum to either commission the women or disband the program. The AAF had developed an excess of pilots and pilot candidates. As a result, Arnold (who had been a proponent of militarization) ordered that the WASP be disbanded by December 20, 1944. Arnold is quoted from a speech he delivered at Avenger Field in Sweetwater, Texas on December 7, 1944:

The WASP has completed its mission. Their job has been successful. But as is usual in war, the cost has been heavy. Thirty-eight WASP have died while helping their country move toward the moment of final victory. The Air Forces will long remember their service and their final sacrifice.

On December 7, 1944, the final class of WASP pilots, 71 women in total, graduated from their training regardless of the plan to disband the WASP program within the following two weeks. Following the announcement approximately 20 WASP members offered to continue ferrying aircraft for the compensation of US$1.00 (equivalent to $18.29 in 2025) a year apiece but this offer was rejected. Before the WASP were disbanded, General Arnold ordered all commanding officers at bases where WASPs served, that the "women pilots be issued a certificate similar to an honorable discharge."

Following the group's disbandment some WASP members were allowed to fly on board government aircraft from their former bases to the vicinity of their homes as long as room was available and no additional expenses were incurred. Others had to arrange and pay for their own transportation home. At the conclusion of the WASP program, 915 women pilots were on duty with the AAF: 620 assigned to the Training Command, 141 to the Air Transport Command, 133 to the numbered air forces in the continental United States, 11 to the Weather Wing, 9 to the technical commands and one to the Troop Carrier Command. The WASP members ferried fifty percent of the combat aircraft during the war to 126 bases across the United States. Because of the pioneering and the expertise they demonstrated in successfully flying military aircraft the WASP records showed that women pilots, when given the same training as men pilots, were as capable as men in non-combat flying.

During November 1944 WASP members at Maxwell Air Field founded the Order of Fifinella organization. The organization's initial goals were to help the former WASP members find employment and maintain contact between themselves. Through the years the Order of Fifinella issued newsletters, helped influence legislation and organized reunions. The group held its final meeting in 2008 and was disbanded in 2009.

Many WASPs wanted to continue flying after they were disbanded. Commercial airlines turned women pilots away, "saying public opinion wouldn't stand for it." WASP Teresa James wrote to Congress requesting veteran's status. In order to keep flying, some women wrote Madame Chiang Kai-shek and volunteered for the Chinese Air Force, who were still fighting against Japan. The United States Air Force offered commissions to former WASP in 1949, though all 121 who accepted the commissions were given support and administrative duties and did not fly.

== Legacy ==
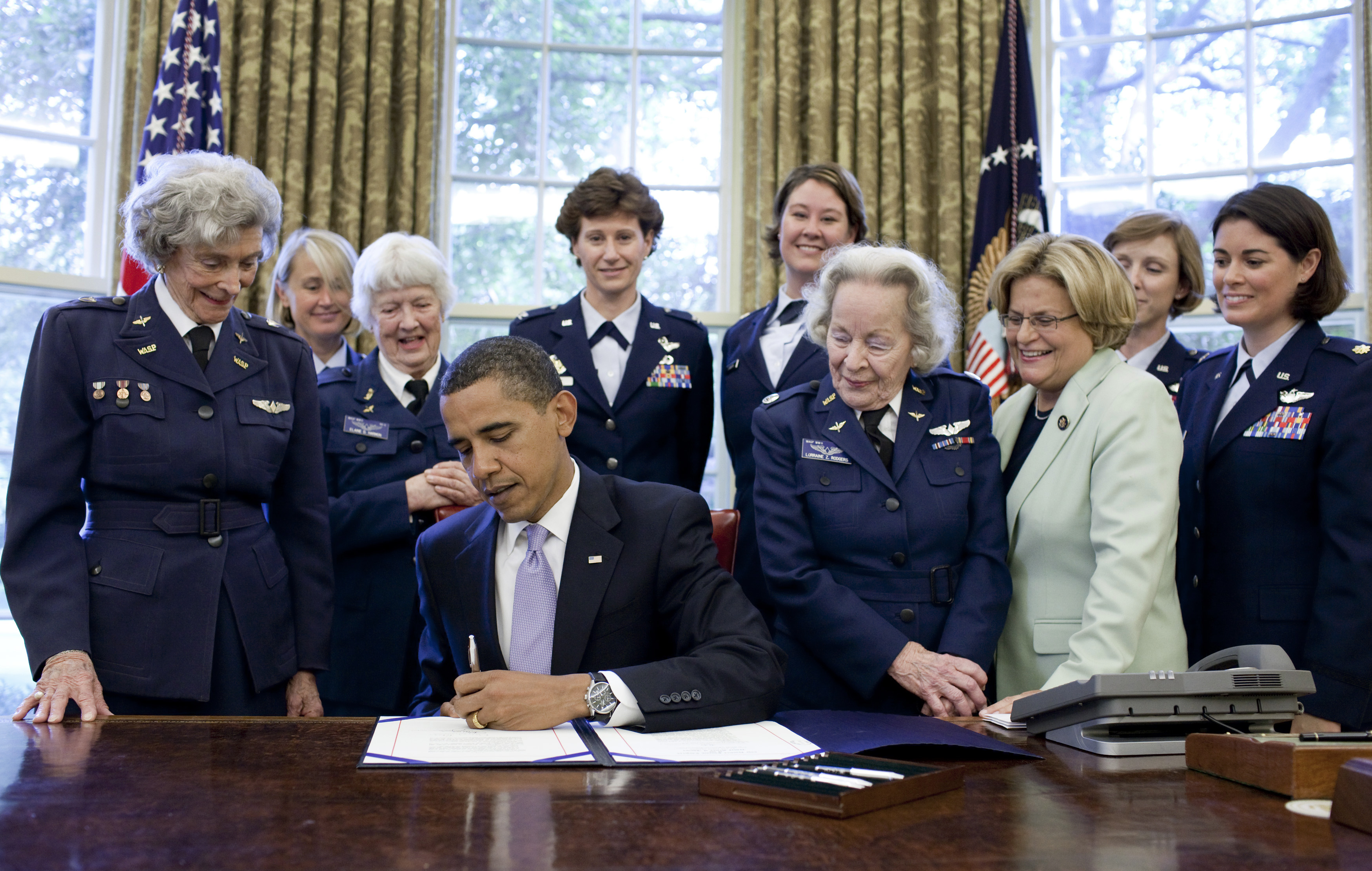
President Barack Obama signing the WASP Congressional Gold Medal bill into law

The records of the WASP program, like nearly all wartime files, were classified and sealed for 35 years making their contributions to the war effort little known and inaccessible to historians. However, there were unofficial historians, like WASP Marty Wyall, who collected scrapbooks and newspaper clippings about what the WASP members had done and what they had gone on to do. Wyall also suggested in 1964, at a Ninety-Nines convention, that the remaining WASP members should meet up with one another every other year.

Early efforts to gain recognition for the WASP continued in the early 1970s. There was support from the office of Senator Barry Goldwater, who had flown with WASP during WWII. Goldwater's efforts to get the WASP veteran's status was met with shocking prejudice in Congress. According to Goldwater's legislative assistant, Terry Emerson, "Women were treated as non-persons." In the House, Representative Patsy Mink introduced a bill on May 17, 1972, to give the WASP veterans status. Another representative in the House, Lindy Boggs, introduced a bill around 1977 to give the WASP military status.

In 1975 under the leadership of Col. Bruce Arnold, the son of General Hap Arnold, along with the surviving WASP members organized as a group again and began what they called the "Battle of Congress". Their goal was to gain public support and have the WASP officially recognized as veterans of World War II. In 1976, there was a bill in the Senate Veteran's Affairs Committee to give the WASPs military status. The bill would allow WASP pilots to use veteran's services. In 1977, WASP records were unsealed after an Air Force press release erroneously stated the Air Force was training the first women to fly military aircraft for the U.S. Documents were compiled that showed during their service WASP members were subject to military discipline, assigned top secret missions and many members were awarded service ribbons after their units were disbanded. It was also shown that WASP member Helen Porter had been issued an Honorable Discharge certificate by her commanding officer following her service. This time, the WASPs lobbied Congress with the important support of Goldwater, who himself had been a World War II ferry pilot in the 27th Ferrying Squadron. During hearings on the legislation opposition to the WASP members being given military recognition was voiced by the Veterans Administration (VA), the American Legion and the Veterans of Foreign Wars (VFW). The VA, led by Dorothy L. Starbuck, argued that WASP should not be given military recognition because the women were never subject to court martial. The VFW felt that giving WASP military recognition would "destroy the special status of veterans and do irreparable damage to veterans benefits."

President Jimmy Carter signed legislation, P.L.95–202, Section 401, The G.I. Bill Improvement Act of 1977, providing that service as a WASP would be considered "active duty" for the purposes of programs administered by the Veterans Administration. Honorable Discharge certificates were issued to the former WASP members in 1979. In 1984, each WASP was awarded the World War II Victory Medal. Those who served for more than one year were also awarded American Theater Ribbon/American Campaign Medal for their service during the war. Many of the medals were accepted by the recipients' sons and daughters on their behalf.

The 1977 legislation, either despite or because of its language, did not expressly allow WASPs to be buried in Arlington National Cemetery. That was because Arlington National Cemetery, unlike most other national cemeteries, is administered by the Department of the Army, not the Department of Veterans Affairs, and thus the Secretary of the Army determines eligibility for Arlington burial. The reason for the position taken by the Army on this issue may have been the rapidly diminishing space at Arlington. But in 2002, the Army re-considered and decided that deceased WASPs were able to be buried in Arlington National Cemetery. In 2015, however, the Army re-interpreted the law and its own regulations against the backdrop of thirteen years of war, which once again threatened to deplete the cemetery of land. The Army ruled that the 1977 statute did not mandate the burial of deceased WASPs at Arlington. When Irene Kinne Englund died on February 15, 2002, the family was shocked to learn that although she could be inurned at Arlington as the spouse of a Navy Veteran, she was denied that rite under her own status as a WASP. Although the 1977 statue allowed WASPs and other Active Duty Designees inurnment rites, they were denied honors and a flag. After a series of highly visible editorials appearing in the Washington Post, the Army officials overseeing the policy, ruled that WASPs inurned at Arlington were entitled to military honors. On June 14, 2002, Irene Kinne Englund became the first WASP to be inurned with military honors. Nine other members of the WASPs were present at the ceremony which featured a rifle team, a bugler, and a flag presentation to the Englund family. When WASP Elaine Harmon died on April 21, 2015, her request to have her ashes interred at Arlington was denied. Another WASP, Florence Shutsy-Reynolds, began a social media campaign to advocate for Harmon and other WASP members who wished to be interred at Arlington. Legislation in 2016 seemingly overruled the Army's interpretation and it was widely reported that WASPs could "again" be buried at Arlington. The 2016 law revived the long-held concern about limited space at the cemetery. Thus, the legislation in the 114th Congress (S.2437 by Sen. Barbara Mikulski (D-Maryland) and H.R. 4336 by Rep. Martha McSally (R-Arizona), a retired Air Force fighter pilot), provides only for interment of cremated remains and not ground burial.

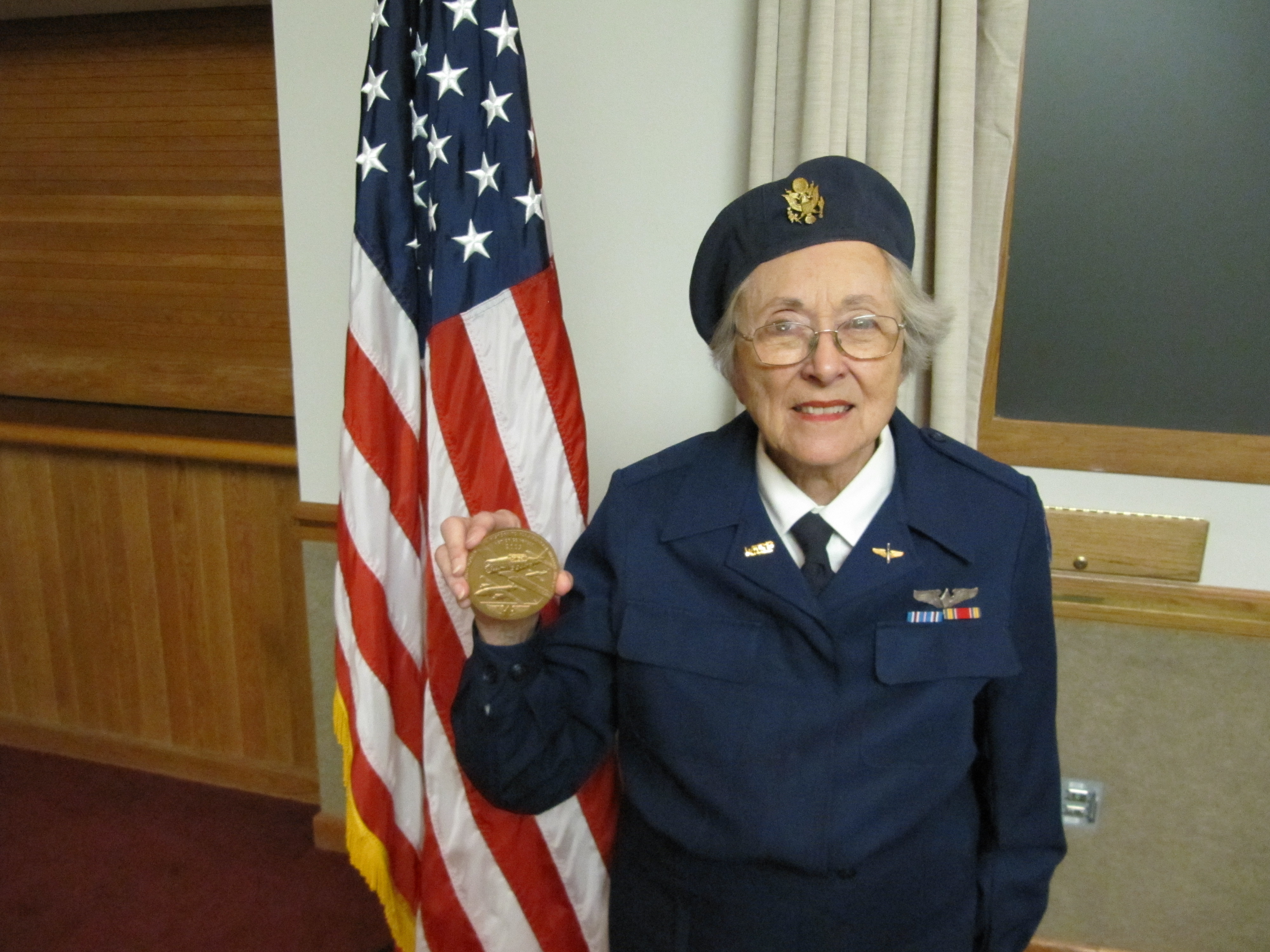
Madge Moore showing the WASP Congressional Gold Medal she received in Washington, D.C.

In 2002 WASP member Deanie Bishop Parrish with her daughter began plans for a museum dedicated to telling the WASPs story. The hangar building used for the museum, Hangar One, was originally built in 1929 and was part of the Sweetwater Municipal Airport facilities which became Avenger Field. In 2005 the National WASP WWII Museum's grand opening was planned for May 28, 2005, which was the 62 anniversary of the first WASP graduating class. Along with the displays of uniforms, vehicles and other artifacts are several aircraft. These include a Boeing-Stearman Model 75 biplane, a Fairchild PT-19 trainer, a UC-78 Bamboo Bomber and a Vultee BT-13 Valiant trainer that was donated in September 2017.

In 2009, the WASPs were inducted into the International Air & Space Hall of Fame at the San Diego Air & Space Museum.

On July 1, 2009, President Barack Obama and the United States Congress awarded the WASP the Congressional Gold Medal. Three of the roughly 300 surviving WASPs were on hand to witness the event. During the ceremony President Obama said, "The Women Airforce Service Pilots courageously answered their country's call in a time of need while blazing a trail for the brave women who have given and continue to give so much in service to this nation since. Every American should be grateful for their service, and I am honored to sign this bill to finally give them some of the hard-earned recognition they deserve." On March 10, 2010, the 300 surviving WASPs came to the US Capitol to accept the Congressional Gold Medal from House Speaker Nancy Pelosi and other Congressional leaders. On New Year's Day in 2014 the Rose Parade featured a float with eight WASP members riding on it. It was designed by sculptor Don Everhart II. The medal is on display at the Boeing Aviation Hangar at the Steven F. Udvar-Hazy Center in Chantilly, Virginia.

Other aspects of the WASP legacy include the designs and symbols of the WASP organization. Shutsy-Reynolds took over WASP merchandising in 1988 and designed the scarf that many WASP members wore. She also created unique jewelry based on the WASP wings symbols.

The WASP actively inspired successive generations of women, including aviator Jerrie Cobb, Desert Storm pilot Kelly Hamilton, astronaut Eileen Collins, Navy pilot Rosemary Mariner, and Terry London Rinehart, who was one of the first 10 women to be hired as a commercial airline pilot in 1976. Colonel Kimberly Olsen "credited the WASP for her opportunity to serve her country."

== Discrimination ==
WASP members faced discrimination because of their sex during their work numerous times. Some male pilots and commanders were unhappy to have a women's presence in the traditionally male setting of the military. One WASP, Lorraine Rodgers, later recalled that some men "refused to acknowledge their ability," or that the men did not trust the smaller women to be able to handle the planes. Some commanders would give out "undesirable" planes to the WASP to fly. One commander at Love Field was eventually formally admonished for treating the women unfairly. WASP Teresa James believed that the women pilots were disliked because they "flew longer than the men (service pilots). We flew our tails off." However, James also reported that she was sometimes "treated like a celebrity" when she stopped at Army bases for refueling. She said, "They had never seen a woman pilot in an Air Force airplane."

Camp Davis at North Carolina had the most prejudice and discrimination against the WASP. The base commander, Major Stephenson, told the women that "both they and the planes were expendable." Women at Camp Davis were unfairly evaluated in their flying, according to WASP Alia Corbett. Women were not given practice time, unlike the men. Sabotage was suspected in some incidents at the camp and Cochran found traces of sugar in the engine at one WASP crash site. Two WASP women died in the line of duty at Camp Davis. There were fourteen accidents involving improperly maintained towing planes at Camp Davis and planes at Camp Davis were found to be using the wrong octane fuel.

While the women were doing the same job as men who were also civilian ferry pilots, the WASP were paid at two-thirds the rate of their male counterparts.

The initial force of the Women's Army Ferrying Service (WAFS) put the cap on the age of recruits at 35 in order "to avoid the irrationality of women when they enter and go through menopause." At the time, the military had determined that age 40 was the time when menopause began, so if the war lasted more than 5 years, most recruits would just be entering the time of "debilitating irrationality." The WASP were even grounded for a time during their menstrual cycles by male commanders because they believed they were "less efficient during menses." This was stopped when flight records showed that this thinking was false. Some WASP were allowed to choose not to fly during menstruation and the pilots' periods were seen as a form of medical disability by military doctors.

On the military planes, there were no facilities for the women to use the bathroom. When women were ferrying the planes, they had to touch down occasionally, and women were not allowed to eat in some restaurants because they were wearing pants.

== Notable WASP aviators ==
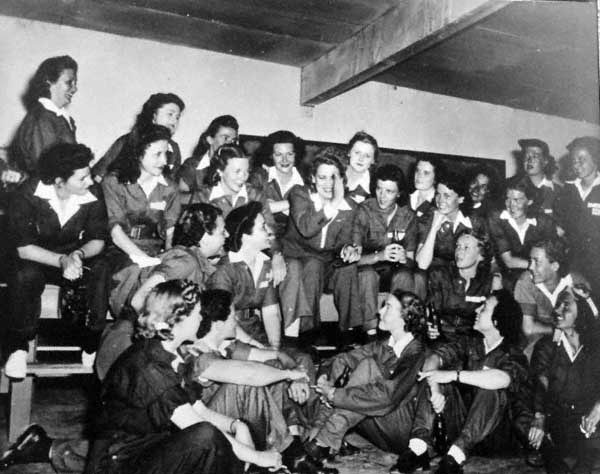
Jackie Cochran (center) with WASP trainees

- Kate Lee Harris Adams
- Velta Benn – First woman to land a military jet on a Navy aircraft carrier
- Betty Tackaberry Blake (1920–2015), the last surviving member of the first WASP training group (Class 43-W-1 at Sweetwater, Texas, graduated April 24, 1943),
- Jean Landis (1918–2022), squad commander.
- Doris Bristol (1920–2010), class of 43-W-5
- Mary S. Reineberg Burchard (1916–2012), class of 44-W-6.
- Ann Baumgartner Carl
- Pearl Laska Chamberlain – First woman to solo a single-engine airplane up the Alaska Highway in 1946.
- Elizabeth "Betty" Maxine Chambers
- Jacqueline Cochran – Director of the WASP. In 1938, Cochran became famous nationwide for winning the Bendix Transcontinental Race
- Gwendolyne Cowart
- Violet Cowden
- Rosa Charlyne Creger
- Nancy Batson Crews
- Selma Cronan
- Nancye Ruth Lowe Crout, (Class 43-W-4), died January 21, 2016.
- Iris Cummings
- Jeanne P. d'Ambly – member of the 43-W-5 class
- Mildred Inks Davidson Dalrymple (Class 44-W-4)
- Dorothy Hilliard Davis, campaigned to get women pilots recognition as military veterans.
- Cornelia Fort – One of the original WAFS. Fort's experience included evading attacking IJNAS carrier planes at Pearl Harbor on December 7, 1941. She became the first WAFS fatality in a midair collision while flying a BT-13 near Merkel, Texas on March 23, 1943.
- Elizabeth L. Gardner of Rockford, Illinois
- Maggie Gee – One of only two Asian-Americans (Chinese) in the WASP, the other being Hazel Ying Lee.

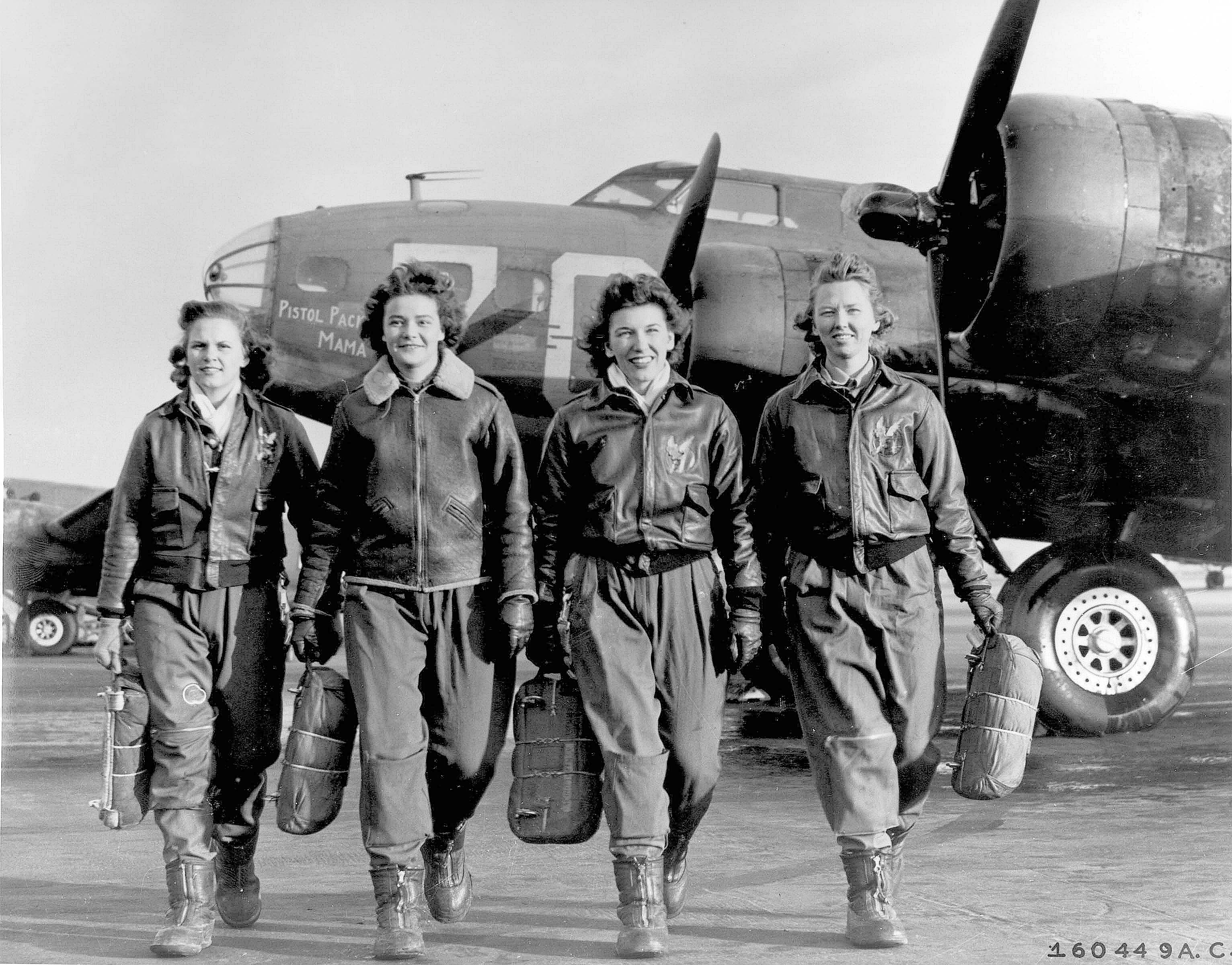
Frances Green, Margaret (Peg) Kirchner, Ann Waldner and Blanche Osborn leaving their plane, "Pistol Packin' Mama"

- Betty Gillies
- Ann Warren Griffith, writer, wrote about her WASP experiences in The New Yorker
- Betty Haas Pfister
- Lois Hailey
- Elaine D. Harmon, first WASP aviator interred at Arlington National Cemetery
- Sara Payne Hayden
- Bernice Falk Haydu
- Gloria Heath
- Jean Hixson
- Marion Stegeman Hodgson wrote a detailed account of her time as a WASP in her autobiography Winning My Wings: A Woman Airforce Service Pilot in World War II.
- Carla Horowitz
- Evelyn Greenblatt Howren
- Celia Hunter
- Marge Hurlburt – She was named to the Board of Directors of the Professional Race Pilots Association to represent the interests of female pilots and held the woman's international airspeed record at the time her death in July 1947. Marge died while performing as part of a flying circus that she joined to raise money to build a new racing airplane.
- Janet Hutchinson – of the Flying Hutchinsons, joined at age 18.
- Teresa James
- Marguerite "Ty" Hughes Killen
- Hazel Ying Lee – One of two Asian-Americans (Chinese) in the WASP, the other being Maggie Gee. Lee was the last WASP member to die while serving in program.
- Dorothy Swain Lewis – Worked at Piper Aircraft Lockhaven, Pennsylvania, Graduate of Phoebe Omlie's Tennessee Bureau of Aeronautics Women Aviation Instructor Program in Nashville TN (Feb 1943), Instructed Navy pilots V-5 program classes 43F, W3G, W3H, Instructed WASP classes 43-W8,44-W2,44-W4, joined WASP in class 44-W7&5, towed targets in B-26, engineering flights various other aircraft, sculpted WASP trainee statue on United States Air Force Academy Honor Court, Colorado Springs, painted official portrait of Janet Reno for US Department of Justice
- Doris Lockness
- Barbara Erickson London – The only WASP member to be awarded the Air Medal during World War II. Following the war, medals were awarded to other WASP members.
- Grace Elizabeth "Betty" Ashwell Lotowycz 44-W-7
- Nancy Love
- Elizabeth Magid – author of the poem Celestial Flight that became a staple of all WASP funerals
- Iola "Nancy" Clay Magruder A member of class 44-W-7, her orders sent her to Enid, Oklahoma where she flew BT-13, BT-15, AT-6, PT-17, and B-18.
- Madge Moore
- Annabelle Craft Moss – Moss flew the AT-6 Trainer, and was responsible for transporting officers from base to base.
- Anne Noggle – Following the war she became a noted photographer and writer. She took the photos for For God, Country and the Thrill of It: Women Airforce Pilots of World War II, with an introduction by Dora Dougherty Strother.
- Dorothy Olsen
- Lorrie Otto
- Deanie Bishop Parrish
- Suzanne Upjohn DeLano Parish, co-founder of Kalamazoo Air Museum, later called the Air Zoo.
- Vilma Lazar Qualls (May 5, 1917 – November 2, 2003) A member of class 43-W-3, she was assigned to Long Beach Army Airbase after training. She flew BT-13, C-47, B-17 and B-24.
- Hazel Jane Raines
- Mabel Rawlinson

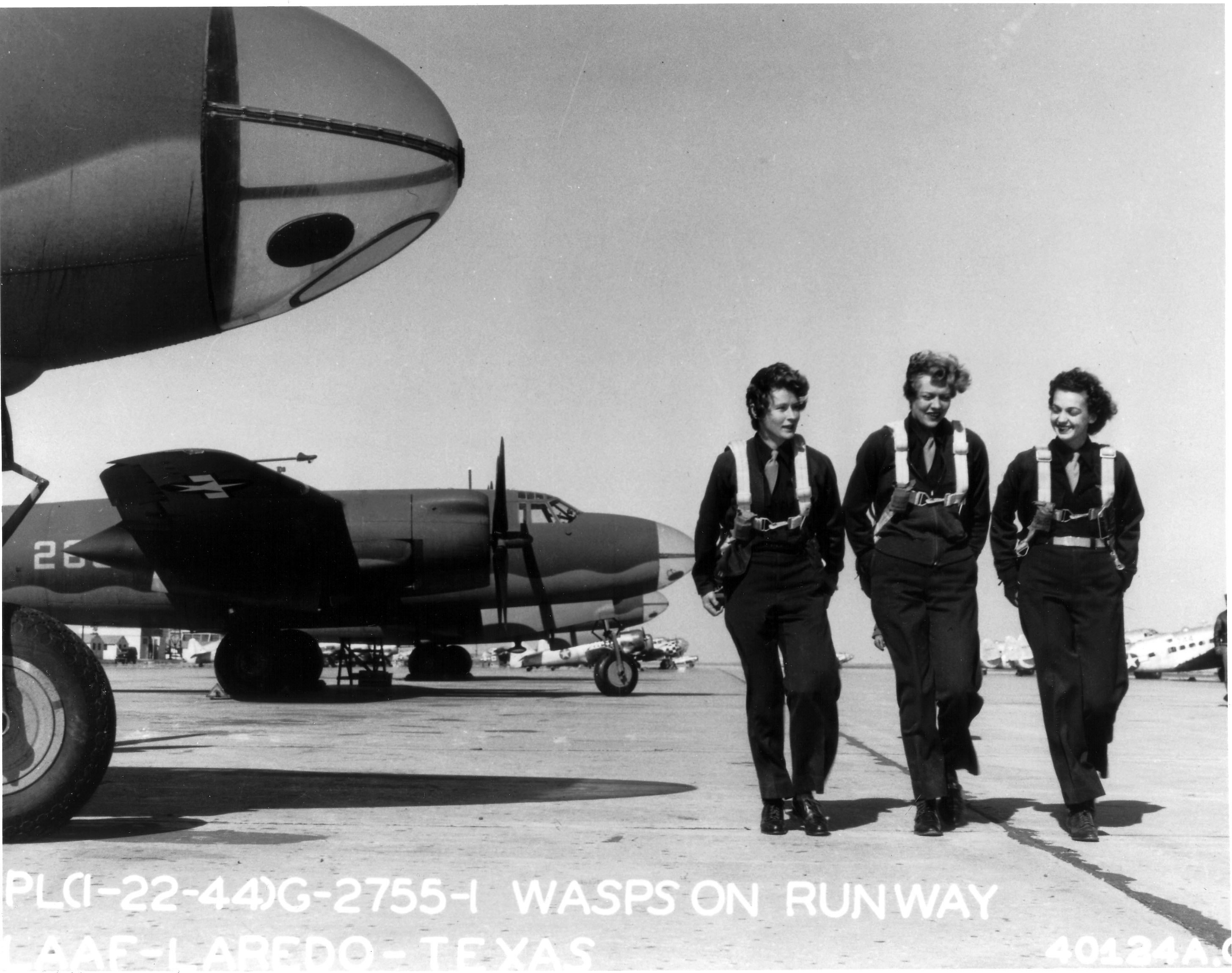
WASP members on the flight line at Laredo Army Air Field, Texas, January 22, 1944

- Katherine Rawls
- Ola Mildred Rexroat, An Oglala Sioux from Pine Ridge Indian Reservation, South Dakota, was the only Native American woman in the WASP.
- Mary Anne Richey
- Margaret Ringenberg
- Lorraine Rodgers
- Dawn Seymour
- Evelyn Sharp – In 1938, Evelyn Sharp was the youngest person in the United States to receive a commercial pilot license.
- Florence Shutsy-Reynolds (1923-2018) – earned her pilot's license in 1941, just before women were barred from the government-operated training program at local airports due to the expected need of more male pilots. Following the death of her husband around 1988, she took over the WASP organization's "Stores" job, making and selling intricate silver and bronze jewelry, banners, scarves and other WASP-themed items.
- Gertrude Tompkins Silver – The only WASP member to go missing during World War II. She departed from Mines Field (currently LAX) for Palm Springs, on October 26, 1944, flying a P-51D Mustang destined for New Jersey but never arrived. In January 2010 search efforts to locate the possible crash site in Santa Monica Bay were unsuccessful.
- Shirley Slade, born in Chicago 1921. On the cover of Life (magazine), July 19, 1943. Trained to fly Bell P-39 Airacobras and Martin B-26 Marauders at three bases: Dodge City AAF, Kansas, Harlingen AAF, Texas, and Love Field, Dallas.
- Helen Wyatt Snapp
- Jane Straughan, graduate of class 43-W-1.
- Elizabeth Strohfus – flew Martin B-26 Marauders and pulled 6 G's in an F-16 at age 72. She died at 96 on March 6, 2016, in Faribault, MN.
- Dora Dougherty Strother
- Alta Corbett Thomas
- Mildred Darlene "Micky" Tuttle Axton
- Mary Coon Walters
- Florene Miller Watson – one of the first WAFS volunteers.
- Betty Jane Williams – went on to become a Lt Colonel in her later military career.
- Mary E. Williamson (1924–2012)
- Ginny Wood
- Marty Wyall – was part of the last class of WASP in 1944. She later became the WASP historian.

== WASP members who died in service ==
- Jane Dolores Champlin (1917-1943) - training accident
- Susan Parker Clarke (1918-1944) - sudden nosedive, cause unknown
- Marjorie Laverne Davis (1922-1944) - training accident, believed to have snagged a power line
- Katherine Applegate Dussaq (1905-1944) - in-flight engine failure
- Marjorie Doris Edwards (1918-1944) - in-flight engine failure, killed in bailout
- Jayne Elizabeth Erikson (1921-1944) - mid-air collision
- Cornelia Fort (1919-1943) - mid-air collision
- Frances Fortune Grimes (1914-1944) - engine failure on takeoff
- Mary P. Hartson (1917-1944) - test flight accident, cause unknown
- Mary Holmes Howson (1919-1944) - mid-air collision
- Edith Clayton Keene (1920-1944) - in-flight wing separation
- Kathryn Barbara Lawrence (1920-1943) - training accident, cause unknown
- Hazel Ying Lee (1912-1944) - runway collision
- Paula Ruth Loop (1916-1944) - crashed shortly after takeoff, cause unknown
- Alice E. Lovejoy (1915-1944) - mid-air collision
- Peggy Wilson Martin (1912-1944) - in-flight engine failure
- Lea Ola McDonald (1921-1944) - landing accident
- Virginia Caraline Moffatt (1912-1943) - landing accident
- Beverly Jean Moses (1922-1944) - training accident, cause unknown
- Dorothy Mae Nichols (1916-1944) - engine failure on takeoff
- Jeanne Lewellen Norbeck (1912-1944) - training accident
- Margaret Sanford Oldenburg (1909-1943) - training accident
- Mabel Virginia Rawlinson (1917-1943) - landing accident; possibly trapped by a faulty canopy release
- Gleanna Roberts (1919-1944) - training accident
- Marie Michell Robinson (1924-1944) - training accident, cause unknown
- Betty Mae Scott (1921-1944) - maintenance error
- Dorothy E. Scott (1920-1943) - runway collision
- Margaret June Seip (1916-1943) - in-flight structural failure
- Helen Jo Anderson Severson (1918-1943) - in-flight structural failure
- Marie Ethel Sharon (1917-1944) - in-flight structural failure resulting from bad weather
- Evelyn Sharp (1919-1944) - engine failure on takeoff, leading to a forced landing; Sharp saved the plane, but died on impact
- Betty Pauline Stine (1921-1944) - in-flight fire, killed in bailout
- Marian J. Toevs (1917-1944) - test flight accident, cause unknown
- Gertrude Tompkins Silver (1911-1944) - disappeared on a ferry run, presumed dead
- Mary Elizabeth Trebing (1920-1943) - in-flight engine failure, snagged power lines while trying to land
- Mary Louise Webster (1919-1944) - in-flight icing
- Bonnie Jean Allaway Welz (1918-1944) - landing accident, cause unknown; possible pilot incapacitation
- Betty Taylor Wood (1921-1943) - landing accident, possible sabotage

== Documentaries and fictional depictions ==
- In the 1943 movie A Guy Named Joe, Pete Sandidge (Spencer Tracy) is the reckless pilot of a North American B-25 Mitchell bomber flying out of England during World War II. He is in love with Women Airforce Service Pilot Dorinda Durston (Irene Dunne), a civilian pilot ferrying aircraft across the Atlantic.
- Ladies Courageous is a 1944 film starring Loretta Young.
- Season 1, Episode 22 of Baa Baa Black Sheep was entitled "W*A*S*P*S". It first aired on March 1, 1977. The episode has several errors of fact. Two are that there is no "s" at the end of the name, because the name itself is plural, and the WASP never flew overseas.
- In the modern Wonder Woman continuity, Steve Trevor's mother, Diana Trevor, was a WASP who inadvertently crash-landed on Themyscira on a mission in the 1940s and died helping the Amazons fight an attacking menace.
- A documentary produced by Ken Magid, Women of Courage, was shown on PBS in 1993.
- A 2009 episode of the TV show Cold Case features the investigators looking for the murderer of a WASP, after her plane is found in modern-day Philadelphia.
- "Flygirl" by Sherri L. Smith, a 2009 YA novel about a young Black woman who passes as white to join the WASPs.
- In the 2012 Captain Marvel story from Marvel comics, Carol Danvers travels through time to 1943 where she fights alongside a squad of Women Airforce Service Pilots on an island off the coast of Peru.
- Season 3, Episode 15 of Army Wives is a flashback episode that mentions the WASP pilots from WWII.
- Meredith Dayna Levy wrote a play called Decision Height which tells the story of six WASP trainees.
- The Hugo and Nebula Award-winning 2018 science fiction novel The Calculating Stars by Mary Robinette Kowal depicts an alternative history of the 1950s space race where former WASP pilots become the first female astronauts.
- Fannie Flagg's 2013 book,The All-Girl Filling Station's Last Reunion features three sisters who fly with WASP.
- Flight Officer Maude Garrett, the main character of the 2020 movie Shadow in the Cloud, is a WASP. The end credits of the movie feature pictures of the Women Air Service Pilots.
- The Voice of Property podcast/radio show named Discovery Mountain has, in its sixth season, a continuing fictional subplot of a WASP named Eleanor Smithers who is accepted into and undergoes WASP training and her first official flight after graduation.
- Angel Wings, a French graphic-novel series, is about Angela McCloud, a (fictional) WASP who – unlike the WASP pilots in real life – flies transport missions in Burma and then the Pacific as cover for secret duties as an agent with the wartime intelligence service, the OSS.
- Derrick Wang's musical drama Fearless, inspired by the life of WASP Hazel Ying Lee, receives its world premiere at Opera Delaware in 2025.

== See also ==
- Betsy Ross Air Corps
- Night Witches (588th Night Bomber Regiment – Soviet)
- Air Transport Auxiliary (ATA – British)
- Royal Canadian Air Force Women's Division (RCAFWD)
- Women Airforce Service Pilots Badge
- Women in the Air Force (WAF)
- Women's Army Corps (WAC)
- Women Accepted for Volunteer Emergency Service (WAVES) The US Navy's WWII era program.
- Women's Auxiliary Air Force (WAAF – British)
- Women's Auxiliary Australian Air Force (WAAAF)
- Women in aviation
- Timeline of women in aviation
