= Florene Miller Watson =

American aviator and educator

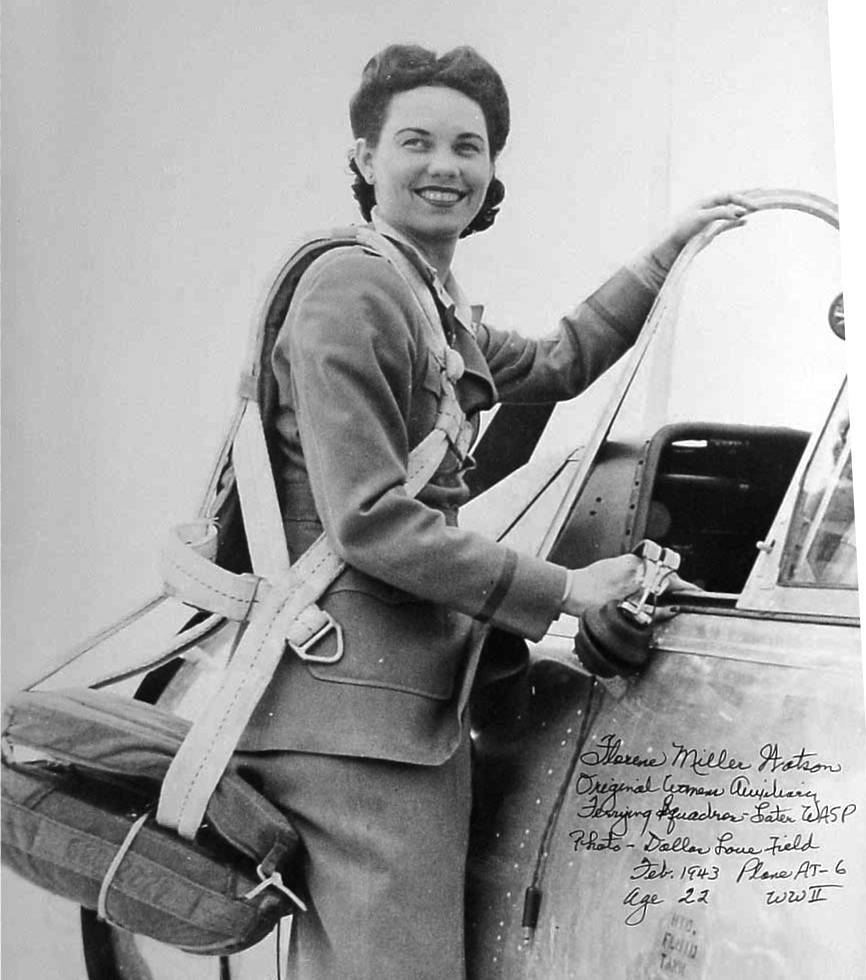
Florene Miller Watson boarding an AT-6 Texan at Love Field in February 1943.

Florene Miller Watson (December 7, 1920 – February 4, 2014) was an American aviator and educator from Texas. Watson was one of the first Women's Auxiliary Ferrying Squadron (WAFS) volunteers. She went on to fly for the Women Air Force Service Pilots (WASP) throughout World War II. During that time, she worked as a trainer, ferried aircraft and was a test pilot.

== Biography ==
Watson was born as Florene Miller in San Angelo, Texas on December 7, 1920. Her first airplane ride was at the age of 8 when she had the chance to ride in a WWI Barnstormer. She started attending Baylor College in 1938. She and her father both enjoyed airplanes and when she was in her second year of college, her father bought a Luscombe airplane so he and his family could learn to fly. Watson went home to learn to fly with her father.

Watson finished flight school and had her first solo fight by age 19. She went on to earn her commercial pilot's license, her ground-school and flight instructor ratings and also learned aerobatics. She started teaching men to fly in the War Training Program in Odessa. Her father and her brother died in a plane crash on July 4, 1941.

When Pearl Harbor was attacked, she volunteered for the Army Air Corps. In 1942, Watson became one of the 25 women who were qualified for the original Women's Auxiliary Ferrying Squadron (WAFS) which later became the Women Air Force Service Pilots (WASP). In January 1943, she became the Commanding officer of the WASPs stationed at Love Field, Dallas. The next year, she started working as a test pilot. Watson got the chance to fly all of the aircraft used by the Air Corps during the war, with her favorite being the American P-51 Mustang.

After the war, Watson chose not to fly again. She felt that she had flown every plane she wanted to and that being a pilot would take money away from her family. She said, "I had accomplished everything I wanted to accomplish." Watson married Chris Watson, a former flight student of hers and together they raised two daughters. Watson attended Lamar State College of Technology, where she majored in secretarial science. She earned her MBA from the University of Houston (UH). She taught college for 30 years, working at UH, Howard College and Frank Phillips College.

Watson was featured in the 1993 documentary, Women of Courage, shown on PBS. She became the first woman to be inducted into the Panhandle Veterans Hall of Fame in 1996. In 2001, Watson was part of the Gathering of Eagles. She was inducted into the Women in Aviation International Pioneer Hall of Fame in 2005. She died on February 4, 2014.
