= Florence Shutsy-Reynolds =

American aviator

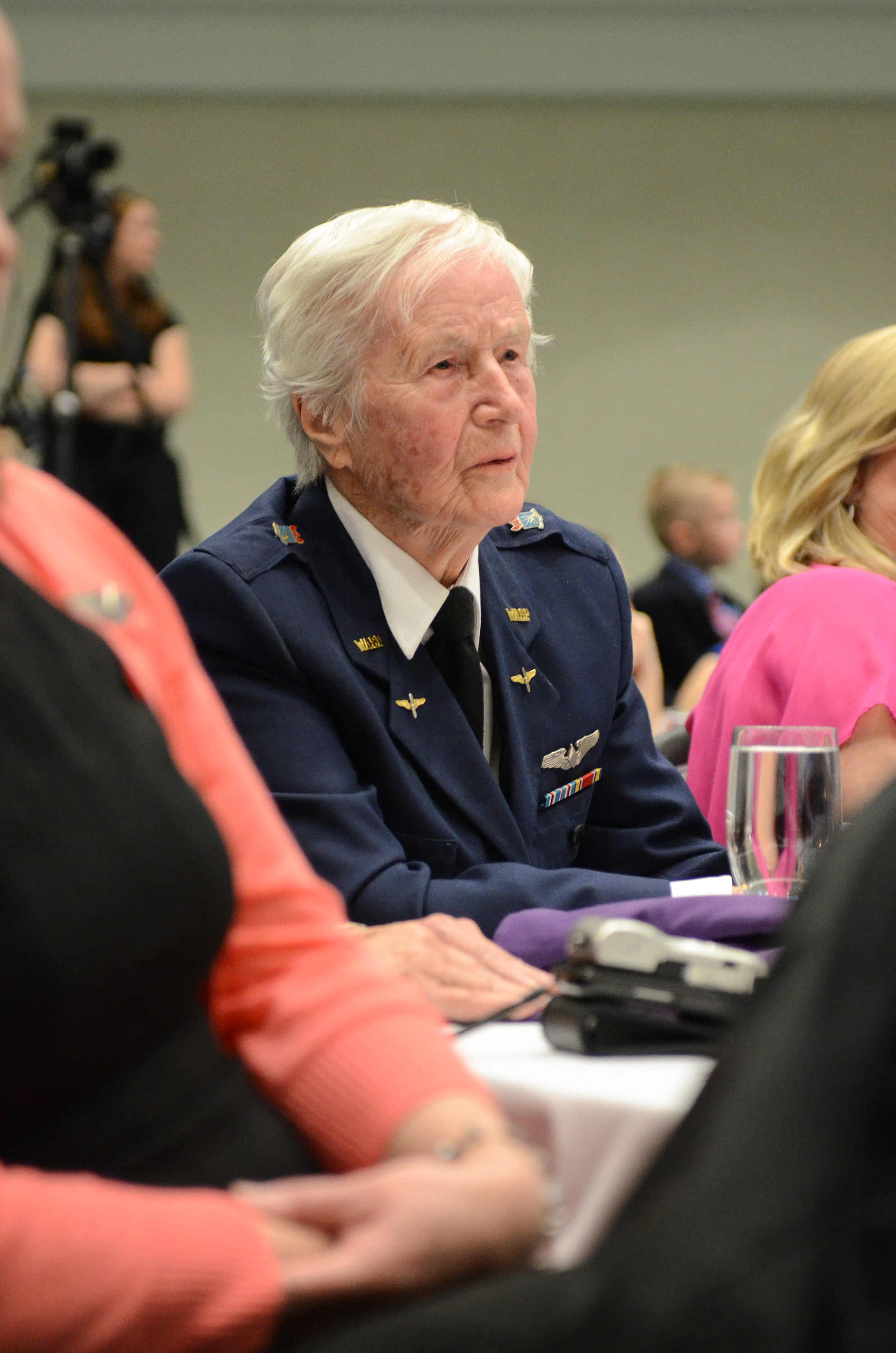
Florence Shutsy Reynolds in 2014.

Florence Shutsy-Reynolds (1923 – March 15, 2018) was an American aviator. She served with the Women's Airforce Service Pilots (WASP) during World War II. Later, she worked as a designer for the WASP organization store, creating jewellery and designs for the group.

== Biography ==
Shutsy-Reynolds was born on March 4, 1923, to Anna and John Shutsy in Connellsville, Pennsylvania and was the youngest of four children. Her brother, Aloysius "A.J." Shutsy, served in the US Merchant Marines during World War II.

Shutsy-Reynolds knew she wanted to fly as early as grade school and her parents were supportive of her dreams. She graduated from Dunbar Township High School in 1940 and started learning to fly with the Civilian Pilot Training Program.

== Career ==
She earned her pilot's license in 1941. When she volunteered for the Women's Airforce Service Pilots (WASP) in 1943, she was assigned the job of engineer and worked on test and ferry flights. Her training she completed at Avenger Field in Sweetwater, Texas. She was stationed at Merced Army Airfield. Shutsy-Reynolds was one of the first women to fly military aircraft.

After the WASP were disbanded in 1944, Shutsy-Reynolds took a bus and hitchhiked her way home where she went to work in her father's repair shop. She had several other jobs over the next few years, including one that took her to Anchorage in 1946. In 1949 she joined the USAD Reserves and became a 2nd Lieutenant. On the way to the job in Alaska, she was reunited with her future husband, Lyle Reynolds. They were married in November 1952, and Shutsy-Reynolds moved to Panama where her husband was stationed. They lived in the Panama Canal Zone for the next 16 years, where she signed up with the USAF Reserves, Caribbean Air Command. In October 1956 she was promoted to Captain. In October 1960 she resigned her commission and stopped flying.

== Jewelry ==
She started learning to weld and work with metal and began to work as an artist and silversmith.

In 1968, she and her husband moved to Connellsville so that they could help care for her mother. She opened her own custom-jewelry business there. Her jewelry work continued after both her mother and husband died in 1986 and 1988 respectively. She began to make jewelry for the WASP store and took over the merchandising for the WASP organization. Shutsy-Reynolds designed the WASP scarf and the WASP WWII flag. She also created commemorative pins and medallions.

When another WASP, Elaine Harmon, died on April 21, 2015, Harmon's request to have her ashes placed in Arlington National Cemetery, as was her right as a person with veteran status, was denied. Shusty-Reynolds started a social media campaign to help WASP veterans like Harmon place their ashes in the cemetery. Harmon was eventually interred at Arlington National Cemetery after a 16 month political battle.

On March 15, 2018, Shusty-Reynolds died in her home in Connellsville.

== Awards ==
Shutsy-Reynolds was awarded the American Campaign Medal and the World War II Victory Medal.

She also was awarded an honorable service lapel button and the Women's Army Corps Service Medal.

In 2007 she was honored for being the first female to earn her WASP pilot’s license.

In 2010, she received her Congressional Gold Medal.
