= Dorothy Davies =

Dorothy Davies may refer to:

- Dorothy Davies (pianist) (1899–1987), New Zealand pianist and piano teacher
- Dorothy Davies (American film actress), actress in Night Fright
- Dorothy Davies, Canadian television actress in The Manipulators

== See also ==
- Dorothy Davis (disambiguation)
