= Terry London Rinehart =

American airline pilot

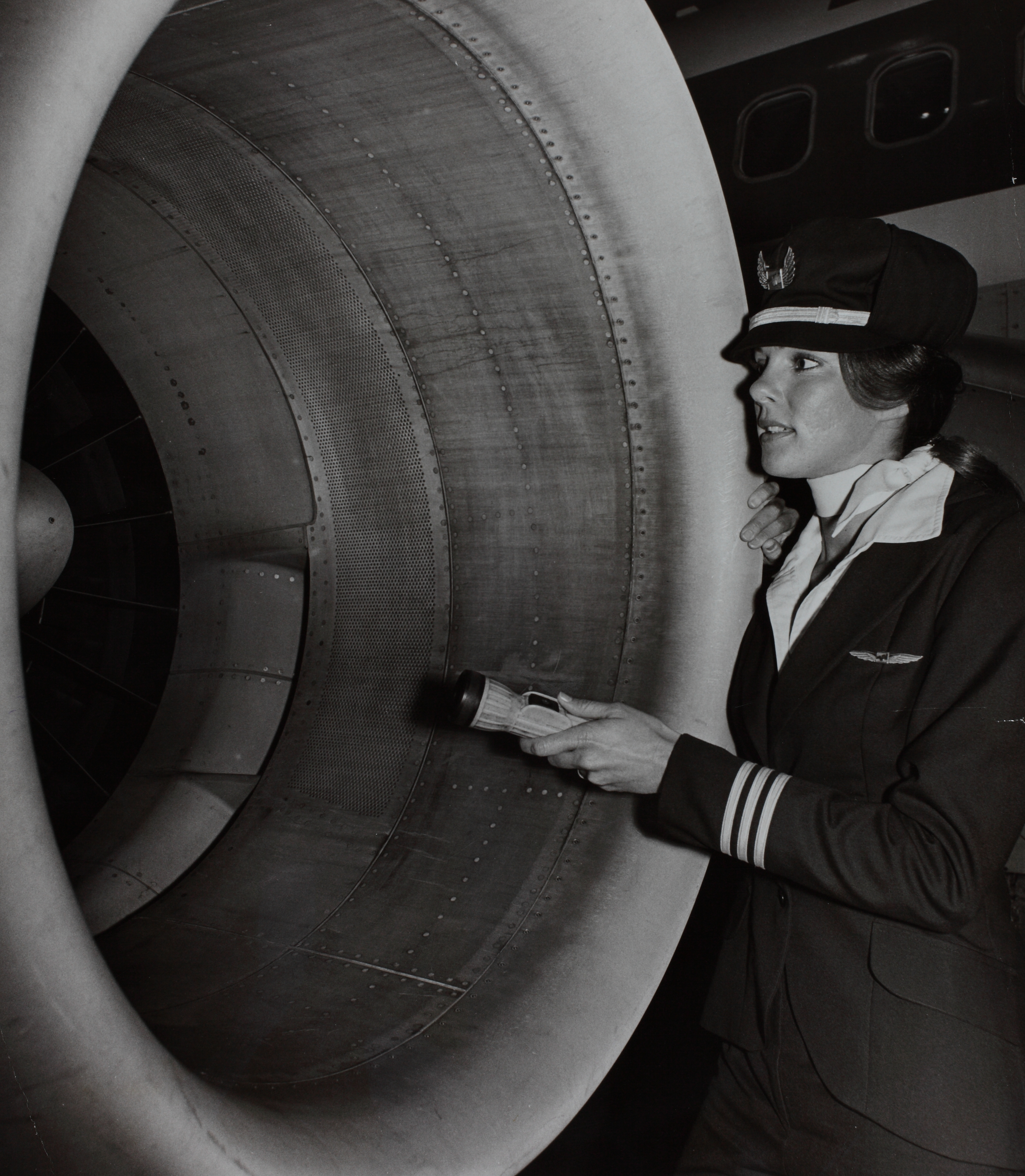
Airline pilot, Terry London Rinehart

Terry London Rinehart is an American airline pilot. When she was hired by Western Airlines in 1976, she was the first woman pilot to fly for them and one of 10 women working as airline pilots in the United States.

== Biography ==
Rinehart was raised in Long Beach, California in a family with a background in aviation. Her mother, Barbara London, served as a Women Airforce Service Pilot.

She graduated from San Jose State University in 1974. In 1976, Rinehart became the first woman hired as a pilot by Western Airlines. At the time, she was one of only ten women working as airline pilots in the United States. After Delta Air Lines acquired Western, she continued her career there, flying as a captain. She began flying the Boeing 737 and later operated the 757 and 767. Rinehart also holds a helicopter pilot’s license and is a member of the Whirly-Girls, an international organization of women helicopter pilots. Her husband, Bob Rinehart, is also a pilot, and their three children have pursued careers in aviation.
