= Women's Flying Training Detachment =

The Women's Flying Training Detachment was an American group of women pilots during World War II. Their main job was to take over male pilot's jobs, such as ferrying planes from factories to United States Army Air Force installations, in order to free male pilots to fight overseas. They later merged with the Women Airforce Ferrying Squadron (formerly the Women's Auxiliary Ferrying Squadron) to form the Women Airforce Service Pilots.

== Early history ==
While on a trip to England, Jacqueline Cochran observed that an organization had been founded for English women pilots to do jobs for male pilots, such as plane ferrying. Being quite interested, she contacted General Henry H. Arnold suggesting that a similar organization be founded in the United States. He approved on September 15, 1942, and the Women's Flying Training Detachment was born. Around the same time, some other women pilots, such as Nancy Harkness Love, were also founding similar organizations in which female pilots replaced male pilots in order that the men could be moved to more important duties.

== Training ==
Initially, the training in Houston, TX, lasted 23 weeks and included 115 hours of flying time. However, not long after, the program moved to Sweetwater, TX and the training increased to 210 hours flying time and became 30 weeks long. To be accepted, trainees were required to be between 21 and 35 years of age and had to have at least 200 hours flying time before entering. This later dropped to 18 years of age minimum and at least 35 hrs. flying experience. The training consisted of mostly cross-country flying with no gunnery.

== Veteran Status ==
Because they were not considered a real part of the army, they and other women pilot organizations were not guaranteed all the rights of veterans. If a woman pilot was killed while on duty, her family would pay for her body to be shipped home, and they couldn't hang a golden star in their window to show the sacrifice they had made. Also, any women pilots who died in training didn't have the right to have an American Flag draped over their coffin.

== See also ==
- Women Airforce Service Pilots
- Women in aviation
- Timeline of women in aviation
- Jacqueline Cochran
- Nancy Harkness Love
