= Dorothy Hilliard Davis =

American pilot, member of the Women Airforce Service Pilots

- Born: 1917
- Died: May 25, 1994 (aged 76–77); San Francisco, California

Dorothy Hilliard Davis (1917–May 25, 1994), was an American pilot, a member of the Women Airforce Service Pilots and instrumental in gaining recognition for the WASPs as military veterans.

== Biography ==
Dorothy "Dottie" Hilliard Davis was born to Oscar Harris Davis and "Dottie" Davis. She was part of the last class to graduate as a WASP in 1944 from Class 44-W-10. The organization was shortly after deactivated as World War II ended.

After the war the veteran pilots were divided into two groups; those who were considered military veterans and those who were not. The women who flew for the Women's Air Service were denied the disability and health benefits available to the male pilots. When the Pentagon announced a group of women to be trained as pilots in 1976 as the first military pilots in the US, the veteran WASPs took action. Davis led the campaign to have the government recognize their involvement. Other supporters included Colonel Bruce Arnold and Senator Barry Goldwater. They achieved part of their goal in 1977 when the G.I. Improvement Act was passed in Congress. President Jimmy Carter recognized them, retroactively, as having been on active military service. However this recognition did not come with any retroactive pay or death insurance.

After her service as a pilot, David worked for the Veterans Administration as a claims adjudicator. In old age Davis suffered from Parkinson's disease and cancer. She died in California May 25, 1994.
