= Messer =

Messer may refer to:

- Messer (surname)
- Messer (sword), a class of single-edged sword
- Messer, Oklahoma, United States, an unincorporated community
- Messer Group, a gas supply company from Germany
- Messer (band), an American hard rock band
- Messer (artist), American electro-pop project of musician Mitch Grassi

== See also ==
- "Messer", a nickname for Messerschmitt aircraft
- The Messers, an alternate name for the 1895 film Partie de cartes
- Messer Street Grounds
- Messor, an ant genus
- Messier (disambiguation)
