= Pattillo =

Pattillo is a surname. Notable people with the surname include:

- Alan Pattillo (1929–2020), British writer and director
- Charles C. Pattillo (1924–2019), American Air Force lieutenant general
- Cuthbert A. Pattillo (1924–2014), United States Air Force Major General
- Greg Pattillo (born 1977), American beatboxing flautist
- Johnny Pattillo (1914–2002), Scottish football player and manager
- Marcus Pattillo (born 1977), American former Major League Baseball umpire
- Mary Pattillo, American sociologist and African-American Studies scholar
- Melba Pattillo Beals, American school de-segregator (Little Rock Nine).
- Roland Pattillo, African-American medical doctor and researcher

== See also ==
- Meanings of minor planet names: 58001–59000#535
