= Georgia Aviation Hall of Fame =

American museum

The Georgia Aviation Hall of Fame recognizes aviation pioneers and contributors associated with the state of Georgia. The museum was created in 1989 by Governor Joe Frank Harris signing House Bill 110. The law called for a 15-member board to oversee the hall of fame, and for it to be housed at the Museum of Aviation at Robins Air Force Base.

Candidates may be living or deceased, but must have been born in Georgia, lived in Georgia for at least four years, or made their contribution to aviation or aerospace in Georgia. The first class of seven was inducted at a banquet on August 26, 1989. A second group of seven was inducted at Robins on May 18, 1991 and a third class of five was inducted on November 7, 1992. Additional inductions have continued into 2025, with the hall of fame now containing 133 individuals.

== Inductees ==
Georgia Aviation Hall of Fame
Name	Image	Birth–Death	Year	Area of achievement	Ref(s)
E. Porter Alexander		(1835–1910)	2006	Military engineer who pioneered using observation balloons during combat	
Julius J. Alexander Jr.		(1937–)	2011	Educator of aviators	
Ronald R "Ron" Alexander		(1942–2016)	2013	Civil aviation businessman, creator of the Candler Field Museum	
Bert Atkinson		(1889–1937)	2009	World War I aviator	
Fred P. Ayres		(1930–)	2002	Aircraft manufacturer Ayres Corporation founder	
Brig. Gen. John C. Bahnsen		(1934–)	2016	Decorated Vietnam War veteran of the U.S. Army	
Capt John M. Bailey		(1945–)	2015	U.S. Air Force	
Capt. Francis Anderson Baker		(1906–1994)	2007		
Samuel "Winn" Baker		(1936–2021)	2013	Delta Air Lines pilot	
Capt. Thomas Prioleau "Pre" Ball		(1906–2006)	2005	Delta Air Lines pilot	
Lt. Col. Winton H. Barron		(1906–1987)	2000		
Elliot Gordon Zachary Bellah		(1906–1996)	2014	Aviator and skydiver	
Forrest E. Boshears		(1913–1991)	2000		
Willis "Buster" Boshears		(1909–1981)	2000		
Willis M. Boshears Jr.		(1944–)	2015	U.S. Air Force	
Connie Bowlin		(1950–)	2009	Civil aviation business	
Ed Bowlin		(1935–2014)	2009	Civil aviation business	
Janet Harmon Bragg		(1907–1993)	2022	First African-American woman to hold a commercial pilot license	
Maj. Gen. Roy D. Bridges Jr.		(1943–)	1995	Former NASA astronaut and former Director of NASA's John F. Kennedy Space Center and Langley Research Center	
Elton Brooks Jr.		(1950–)	2017	Greenland Expedition Society, restorer of vintage military aircraft	
2nd Lieutenant Eugene Jacques Bullard		(1894–1961)	1989	World War I aviator, the first African-American military pilot	
Myrtle "Kay" Cagle		(1925–2020)	2003	Aviator, writer and member of Mercury 13 female astronauts group	
Manley L. "Sonny" Carter Jr.		(1947–1991)	1992	NASA astronaut who flew on STS-33	
Capt. Charles Cevor		(c. 1830–1910)	2006		
Brig. Gen. Dan Cherry		(1939–)	2015	Vietnam War fighter pilot, author of "My Enemy…My Friend"	
Gen. Lucius D. Clay		(1919–1994)	1997	U.S. Air Force officer who was commander-in-chief of the North American Air Defense Command, the Continental Air Defense Command, and was also a commander of Aerospace Defense Command (ADC)	
Donnie L. Cochran		(1954–)	2022	First African-American aviator in the Blue Angels	
Jacqueline "Jackie" Cochran		(1906–1980)	2002	American aviation pioneer and one of the most prominent racing pilots of her generation	
Col. William B. Colgan		(1920–)	1996	US Army Air Corps aviator during World War II	
Col. Stanley N. Collins Jr.		(1937–)	2012	U.S. Navy, Marine Corps, Delta Air Lines	
Lt. Col. Philip E. "Casey" Colman		(1921–2011)	2002		
Charles N. Coppi		(1931–)	2001		
Lt. Col. Alfred Austell Cunningham		(1882–1939)	1991	The first United States Marine Corps officer who became an aviator	
Anthony "Tony" Cushenberry Sr.		(1935–)	2003		
Douglas H. Davis		(1899–1934)	1991		
Stephen Dickson		(1957-)	2024	U.S. Air Force pilot, Delta Air Lines executive and administrator of the Federal Aviation Administration	
Charles H. Dolson		(1906-1992)	2025	Only pilot to become CEO of Delta Air Lines	
Lt. Col. Charles E. "Chuck" Dryden		(1920–2008)	1998	World War II aviator, one of the original Tuskegee Airmen, author of A-Train: Memoirs of a Tuskegee Airman.	
Henry T. Elrod		(1905–1941)	1995	Marine Corps aviator who was the first aviator to receive the Medal of Honor during World War II	
Ben T. Epps		(1888–1937)	1989	Aviation pioneer called “Georgia’s First Aviator”, namesake of Athens Ben Epps Airport	
E. Patrick Epps		(1934–)	2011	Greenland Expedition Society	
Ben T. Epps Jr.		(1916–2001)	1994		
Bruce F. Erion		(1946–2017)	2018	Television aviator	
Ben Faulkner		(1892–1982)	2003		
Charles "Jimmy" Faulkner		(1898–1970)	2003		
Frank Faulkner		(1906–1994)	2003	Helped develop the autogyro at Pitcairn Aviation	
Mike John Ferros		(1943–)	2016	Public safety aviator	
Maj. Gen. George G. Finch		(1902–1986)	1996	Senior Leader of the US Air National Guard	
Patrick J. Finneran Jr.		(194?–)	2022	Marines Corps aviator, executive at Boeing	
Richard Fortenberry		(1938–)	2016	U.S. Army skydiver, one of the original Golden Knights	
Charlotte Fogg Frye		(1893–1983)	1991		
Fitzhugh "Fitz" L. Fulton Jr.		(1925–2015)	1995	Civilian research pilot at NASA's Dryden Flight Research Center after a U.S. Air Force career	
David C. Garrett		(1922–2012)	2014	Delta Air Lines executive	
Maj. Damon J. "Rocky" Gause		(1915–1944)	2000	United States Army Air Corps officer in World War II	
George H. Gay Jr.		(1917–1994)	1994	World War II pilot who participated in the Battle of Midway	
Richard F. Gillis		(1936–2002)	2006		
Albert H. Glenn		(1922–)	2011	Grumman and Gulfstream executive	
John H. "Jack" Gray		(1892–1988)	2012	Supervised creation of Atlanta’s main airport	
Capt./Hon. Denmark Groover Jr.		(1922–2001)	2002	World War II Marines Corps aviator with the so-called Black Sheep Squadron	
Lt. Gen. Robert E. Hails		(1923–2012)	2001	U.S. Air Force officer long associated with Georgia bases including Moody and Robins; made significant contributions to aircraft engineering	
Hollis L. Harris		(1931–2016)	2005	Executive for Delta Air Lines, Continental Air Lines, Air Canada and World Airways	
George B. Harrison		(-)	2023	U.S. Air Force major general and research engineer at Georgia Tech Research Institute	
Daniel J. Haughton		(1911–1987)	1994	Former president and CEO of Lockheed Corporation	
Capt. Basil Victor Hewes		(1922–2011)	1997	Aviation fire safety pioneer who flew for Delta and the Royal Air Force	
Guy Franklin Hill Sr.		(1921–2004)	2004	Civil aviation pioneer, early aerial traffic reporter, Hill Aviation Service	
Marion Stegeman Hodgson		(1921–2016)	2006		
Capt. James John Hoogerwerf		(1943–)	2020	U.S. Air Force, Delta Air Lines	
Beverly E. "Old Maestro" Howard		(1914–1971)	1996		
Evelyn Greenblatt Howren		(1917–1998)	1994	One of the first WASPs in World War II, one of the first women air traffic controllers, organized first all-woman squadron in Civil Air Patrol.	
Duane Huff		(1943–)	2020	Young Eagles program	
Frank W. Hulse		(1912–1992)	1991	Founder and former chairman of Southern Airways	
Frank O'Driscoll Hunter		(1894–1982)	1989	World War I aviator, Georgia’s only flying ace	
Col. Joe. M. Jackson		(1923–)	1998	Vietnam War aviator for United States Air Force, Medal of Honor recipient	
Billy Maddox Jones		(1925–2013)	2018	U.S. Army Air Corps, Lockheed test pilot	
Lewis H. Jordan		(1944–)	2013	AirTran (ValuJet) airline founder	
Edward J. Jungemann		(1918–2012)	2004		
Johnny S. Kytle		(1905–1931)	2014	Air mail aviator and aerial acrobat	
Bill Lavender		(1952-)	2024	Agricultural aviation industry	
Henry Edward Lowe		(1951–)	2019	Lowe's Aviation in Macon	
James Tarver Lowe		(1913–1998)	1996	Founder of Lowe's Aviation in Macon	
Samuel A. Lyons		(1944–)	2009	Artist	
Patricia "Mother" Malone		(1924–2008)	2010	Educator of aviators, early member of WAVES	
Henry "Doc" Manget Jr.		(1921–2004)	1998	World War II bomber pilot	
Douglas G. Matthews		(-)	2025	Aviator	
Belford D. Maule		(1911–1995)	1992	Civilian aircraft manufacturer with Maule Air	
June Maule		(1917–2009)	1999	Civilian aircraft manufacturer with Maule Air	
Frank M. McAfee		(1917–2006)	2007	United States Navy fighter pilot and flying ace in World War II	
Capt. David S. McCampbell		(1910–1996)	1999	United States Navy fighter pilot and Medal of Honor recipient	
Maj. Thomas B. McGuire Jr.		(1920–1945)	1997	United States Army major killed in action during World War II, posthumously awarded the Medal of Honor	
John Bingham McKibbon Jr.		(1924–)	2018	U.S. Air Force	
Robert D. "Bob" McSwiggan		(1931–)	2012	Educator of aviators	
Hamilton McWhorter III		(1921–2008)	1989	U.S. Navy World War II aviator	
Col. Howard H. "Mac" McWhorter Jr.		(1931–2007)	1998		
Glenn E. Messer		(1896–1995)	1991	Educator of aviators, including Charles Lindbergh in 1923	
Joseph C. Miles		(1924–2015)	2007		
Col. James S. Mosbey		(1942–)	2010	U.S. Air Force	
Henry Tift Myers Sr.		(1907–1968)	2007		
Maj. Gen. Cornelius Nugteren		(1928–2017)	2004	United States Air Force major general associated with Robins Air Force Base	
Lt. Col. Winship Nunnally		(1885-1975)	2016	Civil aviation	
Maj. Marion P. "Dutch" Owens		(1921–2005)	2003		
Maj. Gen. Joel B. Paris III		(1922–2014)	2002		
Charles “Buck" Pattillo		(1924–2019)	2000	Air Force lieutenant general who was deputy commander in chief, U.S. Readiness Command	
Cuthbert "Bill" Pattillo		(1924–2014)	2000	Major general in the United States Air Force who served as director of plans and policy for the United States Readiness Command	
Lt. Col. Aldine "Al" Patton		(1923–2015)	2005		
Maj. Gen. John R. Paulk		(1931–)	2010	U.S. Air Force	
Allen E. Paulson		(1922–2000)	1992	Aviation businessman	
Sonny Perdue		(1946-)	2025	Former Governor of Georgia and United States Secretary of Agriculture	
Curtis Pitts		(1915–2005)	1991	Designer of a series of aerobatic biplanes known as the Pitts Special	
Maj. Stephen W. Pless		(1939–1969)	2012	United States Marine Corps during the Vietnam War who received the Medal of Honor	
Jack H. Powell		(1933-2023)	2023	U.S. Air Force colonel and aviator.	
Hazel Jane Raines		(1916–1956)	1989	U.S. Army Air Corps, World War II aviator, “Georgia’s First Lady in Flight”, a Georgia Woman of Achievement	
Tom Reilly		(1942-)	2023	Aviator and historic airplane restorer	
James H. Rhyne		(1934–2001)	2011	Air America pilot	
Edward V. Rickenbacker		(1890–1973)	1999	fighter ace in World War I and Medal of Honor recipient; long associated with Eastern Air Lines which was based in Atlanta	
Carl E. Sanders		(1925–2014)	1997	74th governor of the state of Georgia, who encouraged airport construction throughout the state	
Tye Carter Sanders		(1895–1993)	1991	Early proponent of Atlanta's airport Candler Field, helped convince his friend William B. Hartsfield it was a good idea	
Robert L. Scott Jr.		(1908–2006)	1989	U.S. Air Force, World War II aviator, author of "God Is My Co-Pilot”	
Lt. Col. Mack D. Secord		(1932–)	2014	U.S. Air Force	
Lt. Col. Earnest A. Shelton		(1917–2014)	2009	U.S. Army, World War II aviator, aviation instructor	
Lt. Col. Christofer B. Smisson		(1948–2003)	2006	Delta Air Lines pilot who competed in aerobatics competitions	
Major General Perry McCoy Smith		(1934–)	2020	U.S. Air Force Major General; Aviation and military commentary on TV	
Col. Robert H. Sprayberry		(1928–2003)	2005		
Guy Orlando Stone		(1896–1980)	1989	World War I aviator	
Mark Thompson		(1951-)	2024	Racing driver and aviator	
Lance Paige Toland		(1955–)	2019	Aviation insurance industry	
Norman Topshe		(1914–2009)	2019	52 year career with Delta Air Lines	
Adm. John H. Towers		(1885–1955)	2004	United States Navy admiral and pioneer naval aviator	
Vice Adm. Richard H. Truly		(1937–2024)	1995	United States Navy fighter pilot, former astronaut for both the United States Air Force and NASA, eighth NASA Administrator. He was the first former astronaut to head the space agency.	
Gil West		(1961-)	2023	Former COO of Delta Air Lines	
Capt. Hilliard A. Wilbanks		(1933–1967)	2001	Vietnam War pilot for United States Air Force, he posthumously received the Medal of Honor	
Michael D. Williams		(-)	2025	Aviation industry inventor	
Col. Lynn "L.E." Witt Jr.		(1916–2003)	2010	World War II aviator	
Collett Everman Woolman		(1889–1966)	1992	Delta Air Lines co-founder	
Capt. John W. Young		(1930 – 2018)	2001	NASA astronaut, naval officer and aviator, test pilot. Ninth person to walk on the Moon during Apollo 16, commanded STS-1, STS-9.	

== See also ==
- North American aviation halls of fame
