= Messier =

Messier may refer to:

== People with the surname ==
- Ashley Messier (born 2002), Canadian ice hockey player
- Charles Messier (1730–1817), French astronomer
- Doug Messier (born 1936), Canadian ice hockey player and coach
- Éric Messier (born 1973), Canadian ice hockey player
- George Messier (1896–1933), French inventor
- Jean-Marie Messier (born 1956), French businessman
- Joby Messier (born 1970), Canadian ice hockey player
- Lauren Messier (born 2003), Canadian ice hockey player
- Marc Messier (1947–2026), Canadian actor and film-maker
- Mark Messier (born 1961), Canadian ice hockey player
- Mary Messier (born 1952), American politician
- Mitch Messier (born 1965), Canadian ice hockey player
- Paul Messier (ice hockey) (born 1958), Canadian ice hockey player
- Paul Arthur Messier (born 1962), American art conservator

== Other uses ==
- Messier Channel in western Patagonia, Chile
- Messier objects, set of 110 astronomical objects
- Messier (crater) on the Moon
- Messier (automobile), French car manufacturer 1925–1931
- Messier-Dowty (and succeeding companies), manufacturers of aircraft landing gear
