= Messier experimental aircraft =

Messier (unnamed)

General information
- Type: Experimental aircraft
- National origin: France
- Manufacturer: Messier
- Number built: 1

History
- First flight: 24 April 1934

This aircraft, Messier's only aircraft and unnamed, was a one-off built to show the advantage of undercarriage retraction and the practicality of a bicycle wheel arrangement.

== Design and development ==
George Messier's initial interests were in the motor industry, where he became interested in oleo- and oleo-pneumatic suspensions. His shock-absorbing struts became familiar in aircraft landing gear. As aircraft speeds increased around 1930, so too did an awareness of the drag of fixed gear and the possibility of raising speeds further by its retraction. The best place, wings or fuselage, to stow the raised gear remained an open question. The one aircraft he built, unnamed in contemporary sources, was intended to show that retraction significantly increased maximum speeds and that a bicycle arrangement provided practical stowage and a safe undercarriage.

The Messier was an aerodynamically clean, low wing monoplane. Its metal-structured wings were built around single box spars, with a support structure designed and patented by Messier and covered with unstressed plywood. The plan was trapezoidal, strongly tapered from 1.80 m (5 ft 11 in) at the root to 0.45 m (1 ft 6 in) at the tip. The result was a high aspect ratio of 9.1. The 3.0 m (9 ft 10 in) long ailerons filled most of the trailing edges.

Given this type of wing construction, retraction into them would have been difficult. Instead, Messier decided to retract the wheels into the fuselage and that a bicycle layout was best. As a result, the forward part of the fuselage, built from dural tubes to support the 250 hp (190 kW) Hispano-Suiza inline engine and its chin radiator, the wings, cockpit and landing gear, was longer than usual.

The Messier's enclosed, single seat cockpit had no direct forward view, a choice influenced by some of the Schneider Trophy racers of the day, but was positioned over the wing trailing edge providing forward-oblique and downward views. The pilot sat between the retraced landing wheels with the larger 750 mm (30 in) forward one between his feet. The 500 mm (20 in) rear wheel was well behind him. Both were mounted on Messier oleo-pnuematic legs swung down by hydraulic struts for landing and take-off. The front leg pivoted immediately aft of the engine and the rear from the rear of the pilot's seat. A further hydraulic strut coordinated the movements of the front and rear legs on the ground. Lateral stability at low ground speeds was ensured with two skids, hinged under the wing on retractable, thin, faired legs at about 40% span and fitted with hydraulic dampers.

The tail was conventional, though smaller area than usual because of the longer fuselage. Its triangular plan tailplane was mounted on top of the fuselage and carried narrow, rectangular plan elevators. The tailplane's angle of incidence was adjustable and correlated with the landing gear position. Its blunted fin carried a rectangular profile rudder with a trim tab.

== Operational history ==
The first flight, made on 24 April 1934 was followed by a comprehensive series of test flights, completed before the end of August 1934. To begin them, it was additionally fitted with a conventional, wide track, fixed single axle undercarriage to establish maximum speed with the bicycle gear up. This was then removed and the measurements repeated with the bicycle gear up and down. The results were conclusive: with the fixed undercarriage the maximum speed was 265 km/h (165 mph; 143 kn) and without it, with the bicycle gear down, 255 km/h (158 mph; 138 kn) but retraction increased it by 25% to 318 km/h (198 mph; 172 kn).

These tests added to a recognition of the need for fighters to have retractable undercarriages, though not for Messier's wing structure that required fuselage stowage. His test aircraft was scrapped in March 1937.

== Specifications ==
Data from Les Ailes, August 1934

General characteristics

- Crew: one
- Length: 8.10 m (26 ft 7 in)
- Wingspan: 9.56 m (31 ft 4 in)
- Height: 2.25 m (7 ft 5 in)
- Wing area: 9.40 m^{2} (101.2 sq ft)
- Aspect ratio: 9.7
- Gross weight: 1,200 kg (2,646 lb)
- Powerplant: 1 × Hispano-Suiza 6Mb upright, water-cooled V-6, 190 kW (250 hp)
- Propellers: 3-bladed

Performance

- Maximum speed: 318 km/h (198 mph, 172 kn)
- Time to altitude: 22 min to 5,000 m (16,000 ft)
