= Meuser =

Meuser is a surname. Notable people with the surname include:

- Dan Meuser (born 1964), American businessman and politician
- Jay Meuser (1911–1963), American abstract expressionist painter
- Micki Meuser, German bass player, studio musician, and music producer

== See also ==
- Messer (surname)
