= Cornelius Nugteren =

United States Air Force major general

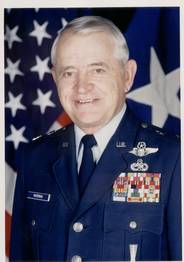
- Born: February 7, 1928; Colton, South Dakota, U.S.
- Died: August 24, 2017 (aged 89); Warner Robins, Georgia, U.S.
- Military career
- Allegiance: United States of America
- Branch: United States Air Force
- Service years: 1952–1988
- Rank: Major general
- Awards: Order of the Sword, others listed in article

Cornelius Nugteren (February 7, 1928 – August 24, 2017) was a major general in the United States Air Force. He was commander of Warner Robins Air Logistics Center at Robins Air Force Base, Georgia from 1982 to his retirement in 1988.

Nugteren was inducted into the Air Force Logistics Command Order of the Sword in May 1985. In September 1986 he received the Air Force Association Ira Eaker Fellow award. In 2004 he was inducted into the Georgia Aviation Hall of Fame.

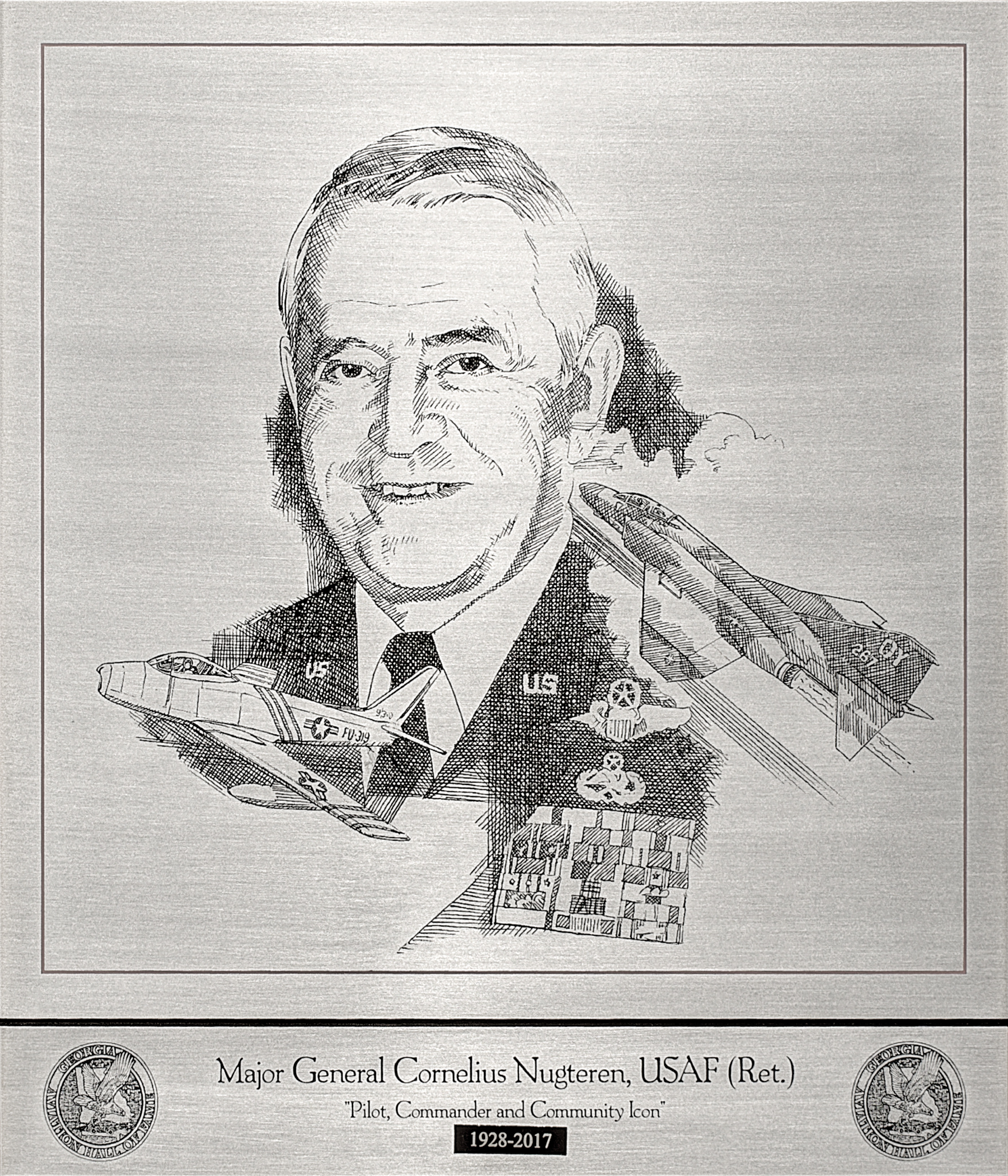
Plaque of Nugteren at the Georgia Aviation Hall of Fame

General Nugteren's U.S. Air Force (Major General) uniform is on display within the Reflections of Culture exhibit at Fernbank Museum, Atlanta, Georgia.
