= Evelyn Howren =

American aviator (1917–1998)

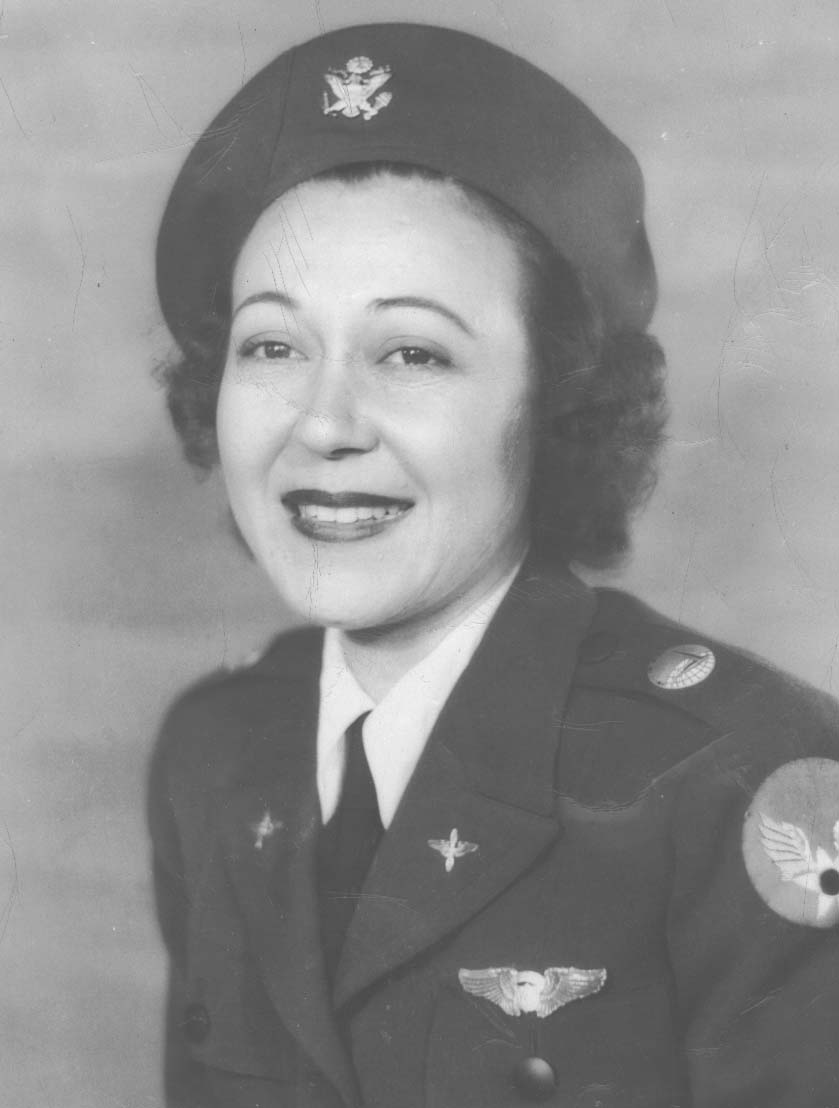
- Howren in 1943
- Born: Evelyn Greenblatt; July 28, 1917; Atlanta, Georgia, U.S.
- Died: February 9, 1998 (aged 80); Atlanta, Georgia, U.S.
- Known for: Woman aviator
- Spouse: Hillman V. Howren

Evelyn Greenblatt Howren (July 28, 1917 – February 9, 1998) was an American woman aviator. She helped organize the first all-woman squadron of the Civil Air Patrol, was one of the first women air traffic controllers in the U.S., and was in the first class of Women Airforce Service Pilots in World War II. After the war she remained active in the aviation business in Georgia for many years. She was the third woman inducted into the Georgia Aviation Hall of Fame. She was born and died in Atlanta, Georgia.

== Biography ==
Evelyn Greenblatt was born in Atlanta in 1917, the daughter of Samuel Robert Greenblatt and Bessie (Shear) Greenblatt. She graduated from North Avenue Presbyterian School in 1934 and attended Vanderbilt University.

It was while at Vanderbilt she took her first flying lesson in 1939. After graduation she took flight instruction at Atlanta's airport (then called Candler Field) Her parents had refused to pay for pilot classes, so she had to do it in secret, sometimes pawning items to come up with cash. (She later recalled once selling the spare tire on her car in order to fund a repair of her Aeronca Chief). She had her first solo flight in a Piper J-3 Cub in early 1941. It was only after the solo flight that she told her parents what she had done.

Greenblatt received her private pilot licence on November 3, 1941. The next month she joined the then just-formed Civil Air Patrol and helped organize its first all-woman squadron. She remained active in the organization for years after. In June 1942, she was among three pilots named to a class of eight women air traffic control trainees, becoming one of the first women air traffic controllers in the United States.

=== Military career ===
With an excellent record and over 300 flying hours, she was released from her air traffic control duty in November 1942 to join the first class of Women Airforce Service Pilots (WASPs). She was one of the first class of twenty-three who graduated on April 24, 1943, at Ellington Field in Houston. During the war she was assigned to Love Field in Dallas and Peterson Army Air Base in Colorado Springs.

Greenblatt spent 16 months ferrying various planes from their manufacturers to military training centers and elsewhere. She flew 30 different military aircraft including the B-17 and B-24 bombers and six types of fighter aircraft. By the end of the war she had logged 3,000 hours of flight time. She was sent with other women in the spring of 1944 to the Army Air Forces School of Applied Tactics in Orlando, which she successfully completed. But she never became an officer because the military ultimately decided to keep its women employees civilians. At that point she went to Colorado Springs to become a flight instrument instructor. "Most of the boys didn't seem to resent being instructed by a woman," she recalled in 1994.

She was honorably discharged on December 20, 1944. After the war the WASPs did not receive G.I. benefits, so Greenblatt lobbied the United States Congress for six years during the 1950s to change that. It wasn't until 1977 that she and the other women who flew in World War II received Veterans Administration benefits.

=== Civilian career ===
In 1947, she founded Flightways, Inc. in Atlanta with another aviator, Hillman V. Howren. The aviation company offered charter service, flying lessons, aerial photography classes and other services. The couple ran an airline refueling business called Air Refuel, as well. They sold their businesses to Lockheed in 1968. It was only after they retired from the business that the two got married.

She was a member of the Ninety-Nines in Georgia and helped organize the Atlanta Women's Aero Club. She flew in the All-Women Trans-continental Air Race in 1951. She was also appointed a captain in the United States Air Force Reserve that same year. At that time it was still rare for women to be pilots - there were only seven women licensed pilots in Atlanta in 1951.

Howren served as secretary-treasurer of the Georgia Aviation Trade Association from 1950 to 1965. She was "instrumental" in promoting state legislation to enhance aviation in Georgia as an aviation lobbyist.

=== Later life and legacy ===
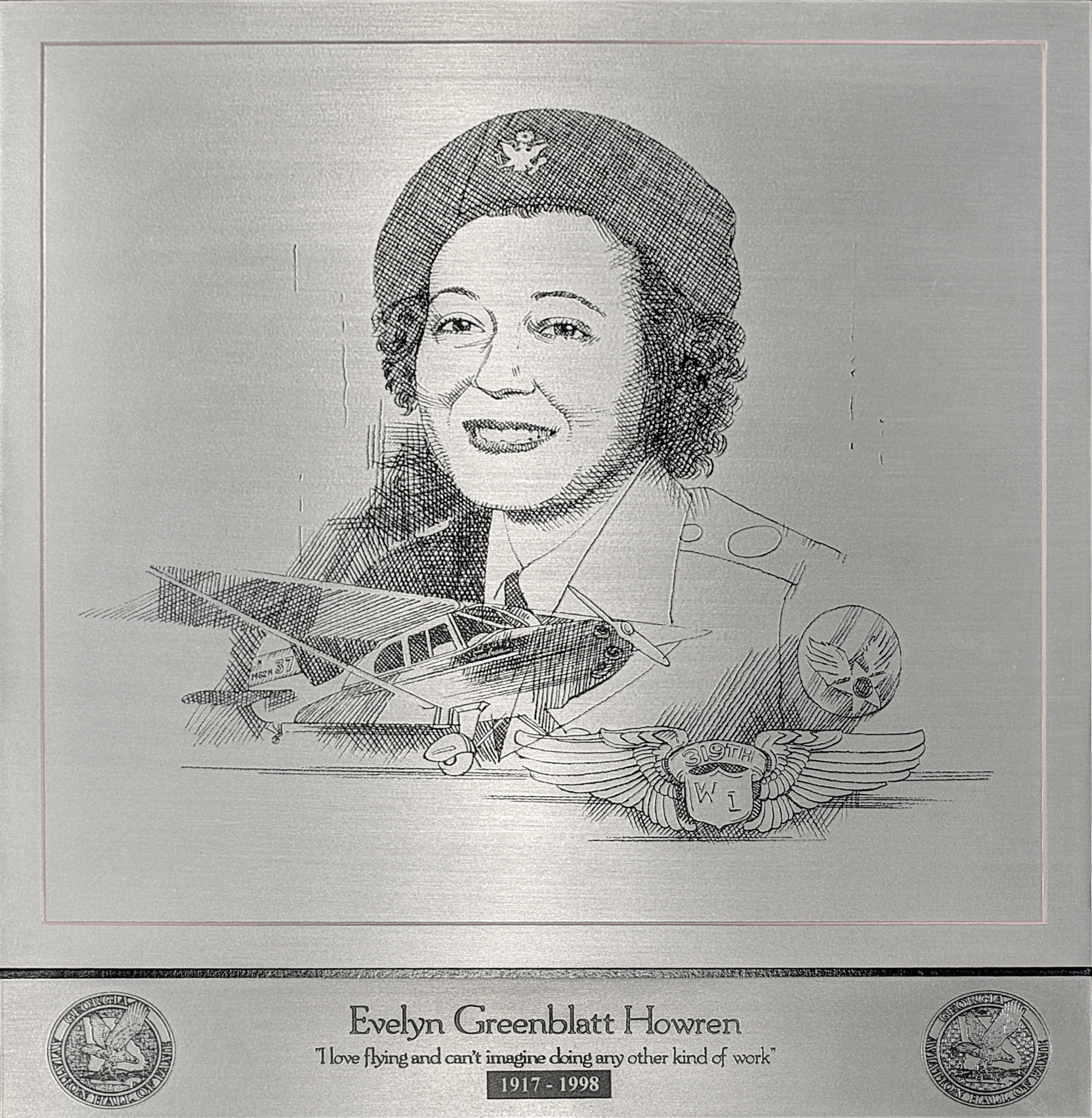
Plaque of Howren at the Georgia Aviation Hall of Fame

After retiring, she and her husband moved to South Florida and spent their time traveling, sailing and deep-sea fishing.

In 1994, she became only the third woman named to the Georgia Aviation Hall of Fame. She died on February 9, 1998, aged 80, of lung failure at Emory University Hospital and was buried at Crestlawn Memorial Park in Atlanta. Her husband had died the year before.

The William Breman Jewish Heritage & Holocaust Museum in Atlanta holds a collection of her papers and other artifacts related to her.
