= Hazel Jane Raines =

American aviator

- Born: April 21, 1916; Waynesboro, Georgia
- Died: September 4, 1956 (aged 40); London, England
- Resting place: Riverside Cemetery, Macon, Georgia; 32.85128°N 83.63813°W
- Education: Wesleyan College
- Known for: First Georgia woman to earn a pilot's license

Hazel Jane Raines (April 21, 1916 – September 4, 1956) was an American pioneer aviator and flight instructor with the Civilian Pilot Training Program. During World War II, she was part of the first group of United States women to fly military aircraft, which they did in a war zone for the civilian British Air Transport Auxiliary. She was later a member of the civilian contract labor Women Airforce Service Pilots. After the war, she taught instrument training in Brazil. When President Harry S. Truman authorized the integration of women into the military, she served with the Women's Air Force and was based in Texas, Alabama, and finally London until her death. Raines was the first woman in Georgia to earn a pilot's license, and has been inducted into both the Georgia Aviation Hall of Fame and the Georgia Women of Achievement.

== Early life ==
She was born in Waynesboro, Georgia, on April 21, 1916, to Frank and Bessie Raines, into a family that already included sisters Frankie and Martha. Raines pursued her dreams of flying in spite of being born with an unspecified heart condition and chronic asthma. She graduated in 1936 from Wesleyan College, a liberal arts school founded a century earlier as the Georgia Female Institute. What is known about her early training and experience is gleaned from the 1996 biography Hazel Jane Raines: Pioneer Lady of Flight written by her niece Regina Trice Hawkins, through her access to personal letters inherited by the family upon the 1971 death of Bessie Raines. She took her first aviator lessons at Herbert Smart Airport in Macon. When she earned her pilot's license in 1938, it earned her the distinction of being the first woman in Georgia to do so. Thereafter, she worked as a stunt pilot at local aviation shows.

== World War II ==
=== Civilian Pilot Training Program ===
As conditions led up to World War II, the United States joined European nations in strengthening its armed forces, which included the training of civilians for participation in the country's defense. The experimental Civilian Pilot Training Program (CPTP) had been operating since 1938, when President Franklin D. Roosevelt signed the Civilian Pilot Training Act on June 27, 1939. The legislation contained a key provision from Illinois congressman Everett Dirksen, "none of the benefits of training or programs shall be denied on account of race, creed, or color", and opened the doors to people who would not otherwise have been eligible in the segregated armed forces that existed at that time. The "redtails" of the Tuskegee Airmen were a direct result of that program. And for the first time, women were being trained as pilots in large numbers. Within its first year, the program qualified 2,500 women as pilots. By the time it ended in 1944, 435,000 men and women had qualified as pilots at 1,460 flight schools, and 1,132 colleges and universities.

Receiving her flight instructor's rating in 1941, Raines became an instructor with the CPTP program in Georgia and Florida in 1942. Besides being an instructor, Raines held a commercial pilot's license, had a documented 1,300 hours of flying time, and was a member of the Ninety-Nines, the Macon Aero Club and the National Aeronautical Association.

=== British Air Transport Auxiliary ===
Pioneering American aviator Jacqueline Cochran was at that time involved with recruiting women for the British Air Transport Auxiliary (ATA) Ferry Pool Service, 14 individual pools of pilots in England and Scotland who were civilian contract employees to the Royal Air Force. The escort fighter aircraft used to accompany bombing raids over Germany were transported from one air base or squadron to another by the ATA. They employed both men and women, with the latter being 16% of the force. Requirements for both men and women were similar but had some key differences. Women pilots were accepted at a slightly younger minimum age, had an education requirement of completing high school, and needed two letters of reference. The male pilots had no education or reference stipulations for their service.

If only you knew how happy I am when I fly a plane! I never feel so completely close to God as when I'm up in the blue. So if you ever get a message that I’ve been in a crackup and have been killed, don't grieve for me more than you can possibly help; just know I died the way I wanted to.

— Hazel Raines, letter to her mother.

Even though Raines modestly joked about being "a two bit flight instructor" for the CPTP, Cochran was sufficiently impressed with her credentials in 1942 to schedule an interview in New York, that resulted in Raines being accepted into the Ferry Pool Service. Training commenced at White Waltham Airfield, during which each pilot was each given a set of Ferry Pilots’ Notes on index cards, instructions on how to fly any plane they were assigned to, whether or not they had prior experience or knowledge of any particular plane. Raines and the 24 other female American flyers working for the Ferry Pool Service during that period established themselves in aviation history as the first women from the United States to fly military aircraft, and they did it in a theater of war. To fly undetected by enemy radar, they used no navigational instruments, made no radio contact while flying, and had no ammunition for defense if the enemy spotted them.

During her service with the ATA, Raines flew numerous types of British escorts, including the Hawker Hurricane, the Supermarine Spitfire, and the de Havilland Tiger Moth. She survived a March 2, 1943 crash landing at Collingbourne Kingston when her Spitfire's engine malfunctioned, landing atop an English cottage. Although the cottage was severely damaged, there were no casualties. The Spitfire lost its wings, Raines managed to pull herself out of the plane and followed the ATA instructions on securing the aircraft, commanding "London – guard that plane!", before being transported to a medical facility. Her head and eye injuries were severe enough for a mandatory medical leave from flying. She resumed her duties in June, flying Airspeed Oxford and Fairchild 24 planes, but was unable to wear a helmet due to ongoing issues with her injuries. Raines left the ATA with the rank of captain, and returned to the United States in August.

=== Women Airforce Service Pilots ===
The United States Army Air Forces had begun to use women pilots as civilian contract labor in 1942. When Cochran returned to the US, she headed the Women's Flying Training Detachment (WFTD). Aviator Nancy Harkness Love was named head of the Women's Auxiliary Ferrying Squadron (WAFS). The two groups were combined under the directorship of Cochran in 1943 to form the Women Airforce Service Pilots (WASP), with training at Avenger Field in Sweetwater, Texas.

I am convinced, that if you girls hadn't gone to England, and were not doing the grand job that you are, that this [wasp] program would never have gotten started

— Jacqueline Cochran to Hazel Raines and colleagues, May 20, 1943

Prior to her return to the United States, Raines and some of the other women pilots had received a letter from Cochran crediting them with laying the groundwork for the creation of the WASPs. In November, Raines joined the WASPs and was made squadron commander at Avenger Field, completing her training ahead of schedule after learning to fly the Martin B-26 Marauder. Her next duty stations were as squadron commander at Pecos Army Air Field in Texas, and Kingman Army Airfield in Arizona.

Both Cochran and Love lobbied for the WASPs to be fully militarized as a branch of the armed services, thereby giving the women not only recognition for their services, but also the same government benefits as the men. Their efforts were unsuccessful, and the WASP program ended on December 20, 1944.

== Final years ==
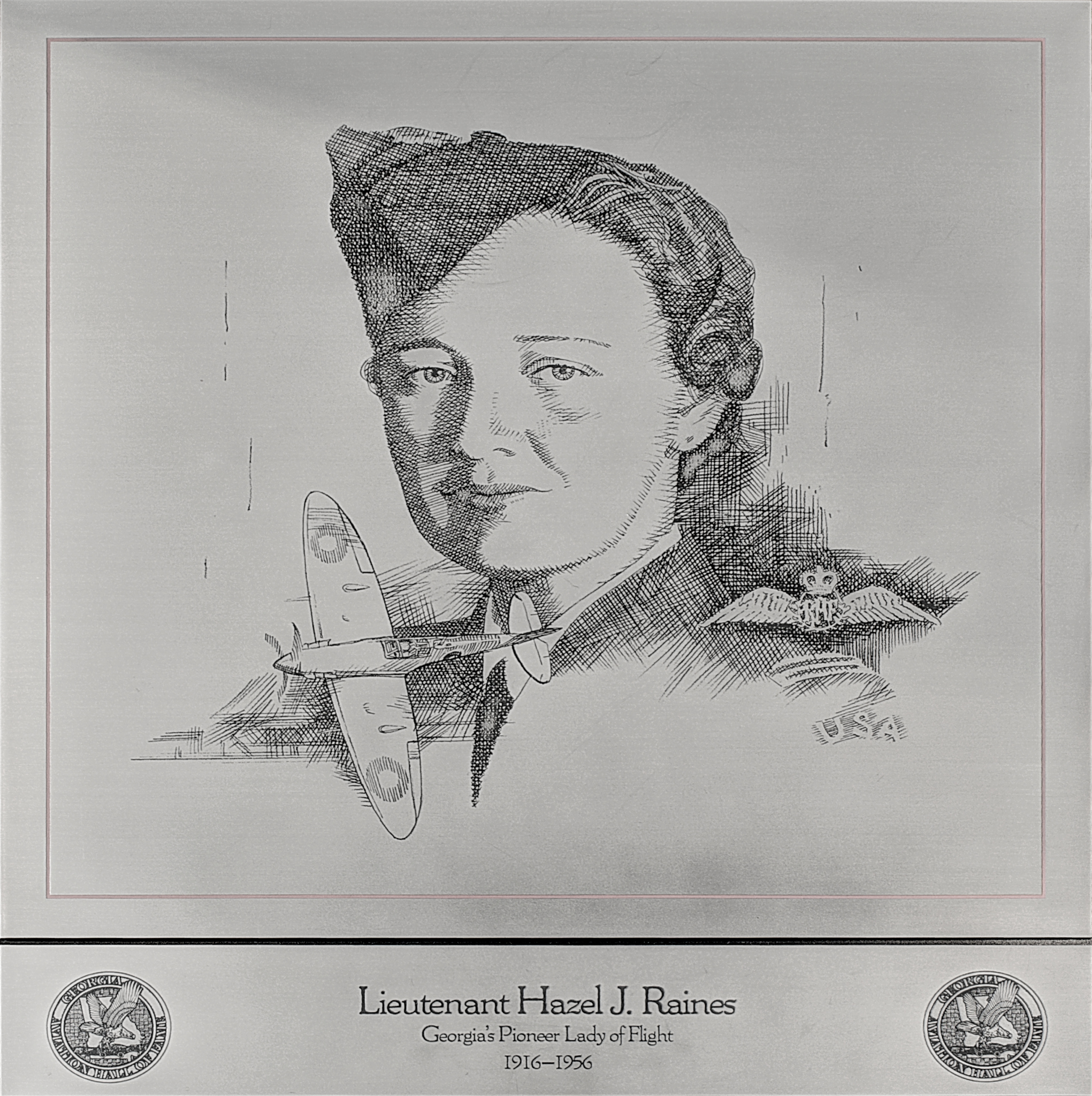
Plaque of Raines at the Georgia Aviation Hall of Fame

Raines found herself at loose ends after the WASP deactivation, despite having logged 6,400 flying hours in her career. She was unemployed with no health care or retirements benefits to sustain her, and her heart condition was deteriorating. She spent a year teaching at the Air Ministry of Brazil in São Paulo, where she used the Link Trainer, a type of flight simulator, for pilot instrument training.

In the United States, she was respected for her accomplishments and was invited as either a speaker or honored guest at conferences and public events. Nevertheless, she wanted to have an active part in aviation. When President Harry S. Truman signed the Women's Armed Services Integration Act of 1948, women were accepted as part of the US military, albeit limited to 2% of the forces. In 1949, Raines was commissioned in the Women's Air Force (WAFs) as a Second lieutenant with the reserves unit at Lackland Air Force Base in San Antonio, Texas. Through determination and nonstop efforts to be recognized, Raines was finally returned to active status in 1950 and stationed at Maxwell Air Force Base in Alabama.

Raines served in administrative capacities before being transferred to London, from where she was dispatched to several European locations. Health issues began to surface in 1956, and she was hospitalized in Wiesbaden and London. She died in London on September 4, and her remains were shipped back to Georgia for burial in Riverside Cemetery.

Raines was inducted into the inaugural class of the Georgia Aviation Hall of Fame in 1989 as "Georgia's First Lady in Flight", and into the Georgia Women of Achievement in 1995.
