= John Fletcher Hanson =

John Fletcher Hanson (November 25, 1840 – 1910) was an American self-made industrialist who lived in the state of Georgia and helped establish the Georgia School of Technology (later known as the Georgia Institute of Technology).

The son of a farmer-preacher, Hanson learned about the brick and furniture industries in Barnesville, Georgia. He later moved to Macon, Georgia, and started the Bibb Manufacturing Company in 1876; it was a textile company that built and acquired mills, particularly in Columbus, Georgia.

In 1881, Hanson became the principal owner of the Macon Telegraph and Messenger, a Republican opponent of the Democratic Atlanta Constitution. It was reportedly at Hanson's request that Harry Stillwell Edwards composed a March 2, 1882, editorial in the Macon Telegraph that proposed to create a polytechnic college in Georgia to build a skilled workforce.

Hanson was also instrumental in electing Nathaniel E. Harris, another strong proponent of a technical school, to the Georgia House of Representatives in 1882. It was Representative (later governor) Harris who introduced a bill in 1882 providing for the establishment of a state technical school, which was chartered in 1885 and opened in 1888, and eventually became Georgia Tech.

Through his connections, Hanson became president of the Central of Georgia Railroad in 1903. One of Georgia Tech's residence halls, Hanson Hall, built in 1961, was named in his honor. He died in 1910 and is buried in Riverside Cemetery (Macon, Georgia).
