= Patricia W. Malone =

American pioneer aviation instructor (1924–2008)

Patricia Malone
- Born: Patricia Waite; July 4, 1924; Cambridge, Massachusetts, US
- Died: August 12, 2008 (aged 84); Kennesaw, Georgia, US
- Other name: "Mother" Malone
- Occupations: WAVE, pilot trainer
- Years active: 1942–1994

Patricia W. Malone (July 4, 1924 – August 12, 2008) was a pioneering member of the WAVES; trainer of aircraft carrier pilots; Link training instructor for the U.S. Air Force, Trans World Airlines, and Northeast Airlines; and the only woman pilot trainer for Delta Air Lines for many years. She was posthumously inducted into the Women in Aviation International Pioneer Hall of Fame in 2009 and the Georgia Aviation Hall of Fame the following year.

== Early life ==
Patricia Waite was born on July 4, 1924, in Cambridge, Massachusetts to Dorothy M. "Billie" (née Hammond) and Amory Hooper "Bud" Waite, Jr. Her father was a radio engineer and adventurer, who had gone on the 1939 Byrd Expedition to Antarctica and for whom Cape Waite is named. Her father encouraged her to be adventurous and follow her curiosity. When she graduated from North Quincy High School in 1942, she began working for Signal Corps Laboratories at Fort Monmouth, New Jersey as a radio engineering aide to her father. She wanted to become an air traffic controller, but was under-age and instead attended Link Trainer courses for twelve weeks in Atlanta at the Naval Air Station. After obtaining aviation training through Navy and Air Force programs, Waite joined the U.S. Navy WAVES in 1944.

== Career ==
During World War II, Waite worked as a Link Trainer Operator for the Navy, training carrier based squadron pilots until 1946, when she was honorably discharged. When the war ended, she was transferred as a civilian employee of the Air Force to McGuire Air Force Base in Eatontown, New Jersey. At McGuire, she taught pilots to fly using instruments, performing pilot training on a flight simulator.

In 1951, newly married and with a new baby, Waite moved to Boston and took a position with Trans World Airlines (TWA) as a Dehmel training instructor. At least until 1955, she continued using her maiden name, before at some point adopting the surname of her second husband, Peter James Malone Jr. Though she was not a pilot and had never flown in a commercial aircraft before she went to work with TWA, Tudor Leland taught her about instrumentation and credited her with saving the careers of pilots by making the instructions in the Federal Aviation Regulations understandable in plain English. In her own words she said that she "never taught a pilot to fly or how a plane works", but she taught them system operations and how to remain safe. After six years with TWA, Malone left in 1957 on maternity leave for the birth of her third child.

In 1960, Malone was hired by Northeast Airlines as a flight instructor and remained with them until the 1963 layoff. During the layoff, she gave birth to her fourth child, worked briefly as a nursing aide in a Boston hospital and then returned to Northeast in 1965. She remained with Northeast until its 1972 merger with Delta Air Lines, when she was relocated to Atlanta. She was tasked with creating Delta's operations specifications curriculum, which included instruction on air traffic control methodology, FAA Regulations, instrument approach charts and flight instrument reviews. She taught all levels of training, from initial instruction to re-qualifications, as well as instruction for Flight Control Dispatchers. Recognized as an industry expert, Malone gave seminars for the FAA and other airlines' personnel on flight safety issues.

In 1984 she was assigned to the Delta Flight Operations, Regulatory Compliance and Incident Management team, and primarily her duties focused on safety measures and compliance. After a decade, she retired from Delta and became a consultant for Jeppesen, JetBlue and private flight operations departments of Coca-Cola, ConAgra and others, reviewing their charts and procedures, performing accident investigations and recommending safety procedures.

== Death and legacy ==
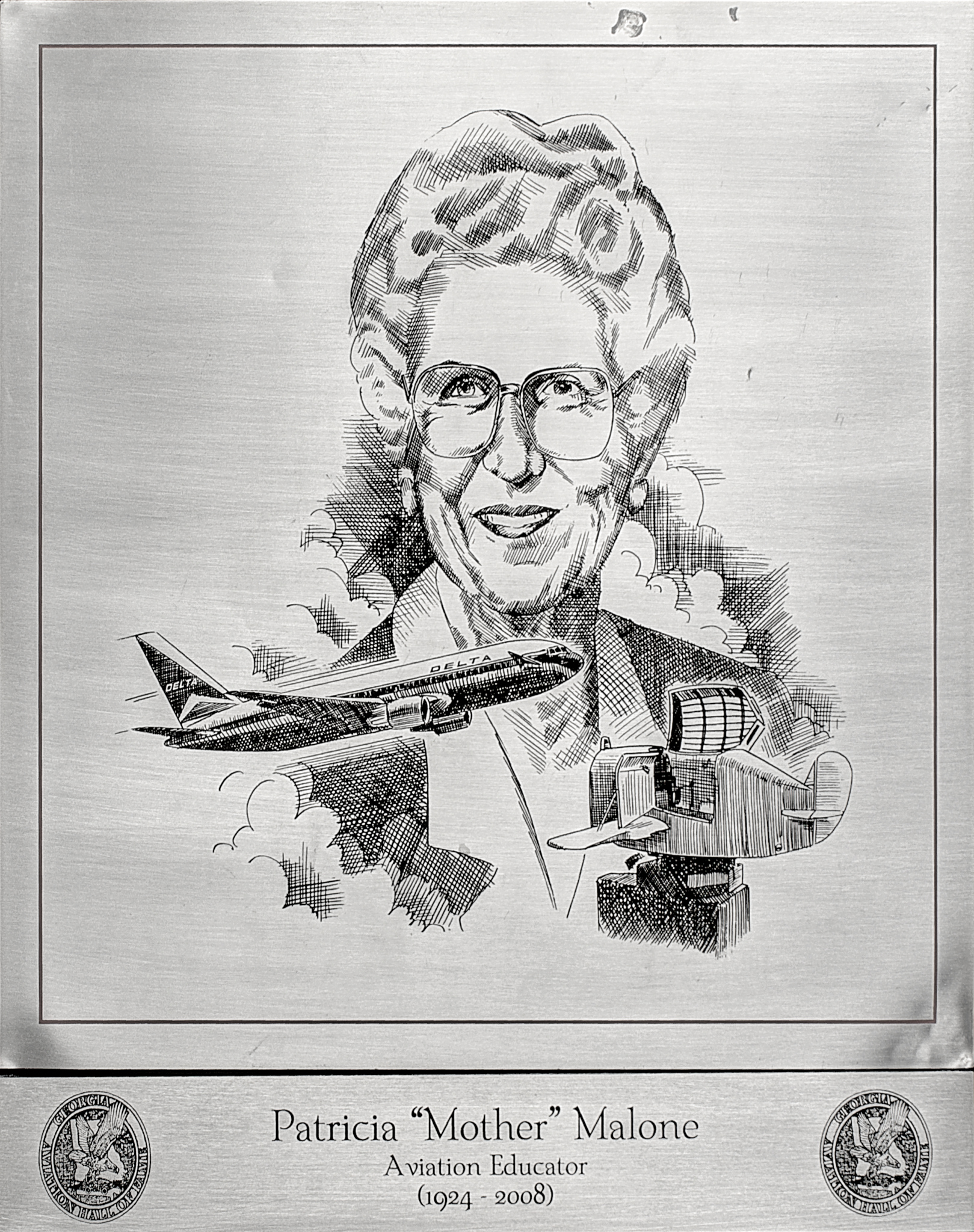
Plaque honoring Malone at the Georgia Aviation Hall of Fame

Malone died on August 12, 2008, of complications from injuries that she sustained in a car accident several weeks earlier. She was buried in Mt. Wollaston Cemetery, in Quincy, Massachusetts, beside her late husband. Posthumously, Malone was inducted as to the Pioneer Hall of Fame of the Women in Aviation International in 2009. The following year, she was inducted into the Georgia Aviation Hall of Fame, with many tributes paid to her for being a beloved "Mother" to many of the pilots she had trained.
