= Riverside Cemetery (Macon, Georgia) =

Historic cemetery in Georgia, US

- U.S. National Register of Historic Places
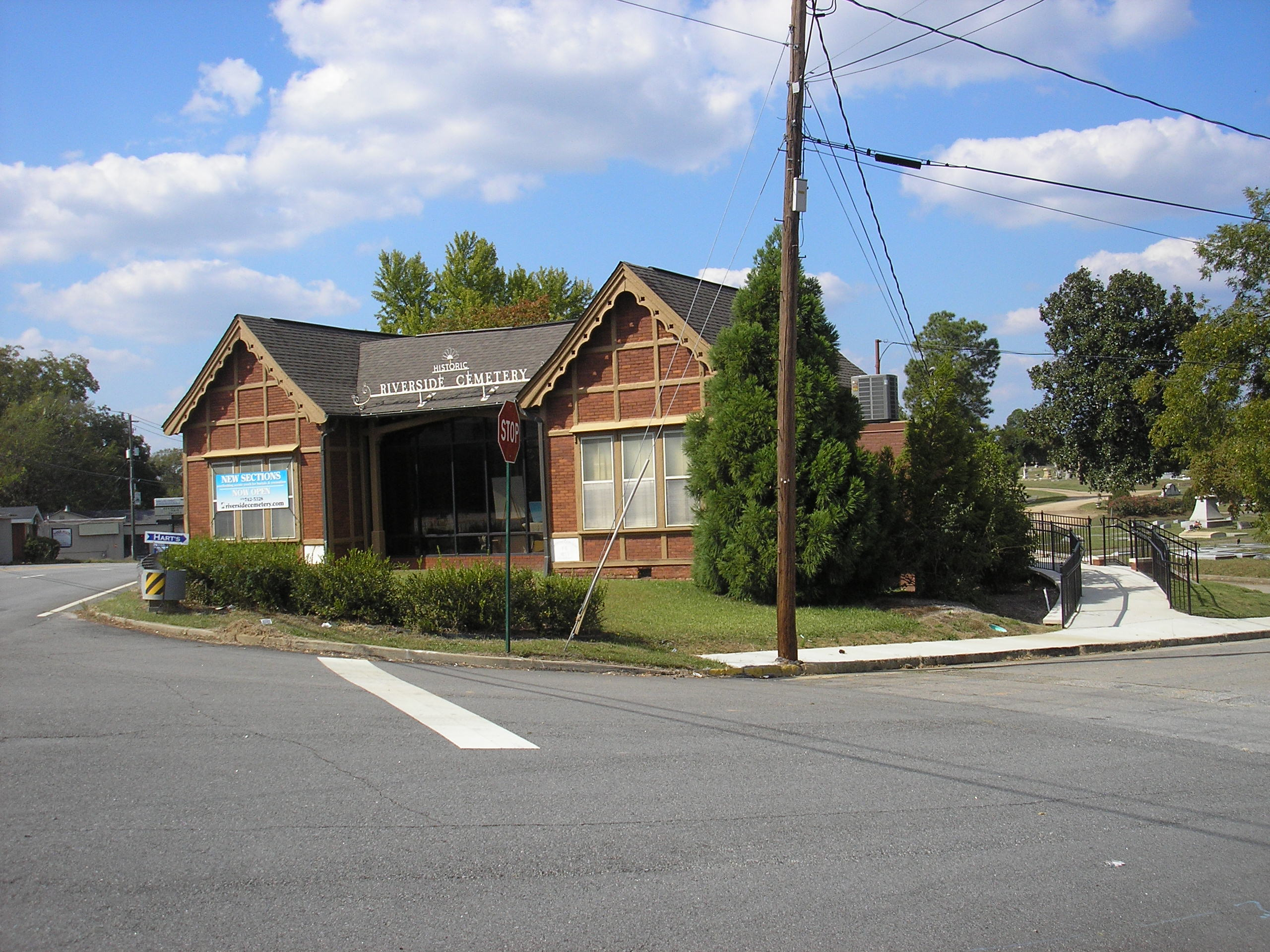
- Gate House at Riverside Cemetery, October 2013

- Location within the United States Location within Georgia
- Location: 1301 Riverside Dr., Macon, Georgia
- Coordinates: 32°51′04″N 83°38′19″W
- Area: 54 acres (22 ha)
- Built: 1887–1889
- Architect: Calvert Vaux; Dennis & Dennis
- NRHP reference No.: 83000183
- Added to NRHP: April 28, 1983

Riverside Cemetery is a historic rural cemetery in Macon, Georgia established in 1887. It is approximately 54 acres (22 ha) in size and privately owned. Over 18,000 people are interred here.

== History ==
Riverside Cemetery Corporation was founded in 1887 to create the cemetery in protest of what was seen as the city of Macon's poor upkeep of Rose Hill Cemetery nearby. That site dated from 1840 and had fallen into disrepair. The differences between the two adjacent cemeteries highlight changes in cemetery design during the 19th century, as well as the trend toward private (rather than public) ownership of these properties.

The original 23 acres (9.3 ha) plan was laid out from 1887 to 1889 and was designed by Vaux & Co., one of the few commissions by the firm in the Southeast. Peter E. Dennis of the local firm Dennis & Dennis was the local supervising architect, and designed the Gate House in 1897. The Mausoleum building was designed by the Georgia Mausoleum Company in 1918.

A triangular-shaped redoubt from the Civil War is preserved within the grounds, overlooking the Ocmulgee River. It was built by troops under the command of Gen. Howell Cobb in July 1864 in preparation for a raid that would take place during Sherman's March to the Sea.

The cemetery was listed on the National Register of Historic Places in 1983.

== Notable interments ==
- King Bailey, Major League Baseball pitcher for the Cincinnati Reds
- Juanita Black, social activist whose husband was first Georgia state trooper killed in the line of duty
- Charles L. Bowden, mayor of Macon, Georgia from 1938 to 1947 and the namesake of the Charles L. Bowden Golf Course
- Peter E. Dennis, architect of the cemetery
- William Arthur Fickling Sr., local businessman who inspired the International Cherry Blossom Festival
- Denmark Groover, Jr., state legislator known for his involvement in changing the design of the flag of the State of Georgia
- Andreas Gruentzig, German radiologist who developed balloon angioplasty
- John Fletcher Hanson, industrialist, founder of the Bibb Manufacturing Company, and "Father of Georgia Tech"
- Parks Lee Hay, Sr., businessman who lived in the Johnston–Felton–Hay House, now a historic museum
- John Raymond Hope, meteorologist for The Weather Channel
- E.D. Huguenin, cotton broker and a pecan farmer, namesake of Huguenin Heights neighborhood
- Leonard Knowles, first Chief Justice of the Bahamas after independence
- Martha Fannin Johnston, socialite who donated the land for the Girl Scout's Camp Martha Johnston
- Ellamae Ellis League, architect, the first woman FAIA from Georgia
- Charles Reb Massenburg, owner of Acme Brewing & later superintendent of Macon Hospital
- Hazel Jane Raines, World War II aviator, Georgia's "First Lady of Flight"
- Martha Bibb Hardaway Redding, one of the three co-founders of Phi Mu
- Emory Speer, attorney, judge and U.S. Congressman
- George Stallings, major league baseball manager
- Young Stribling, professional boxer
- Rosa Taylor, educator in Bibb County Public School District for over 50 years, namesake of Rosa Taylor Elementary School
- Chauncey Vibbard, U.S. Congressman

== Gallery ==
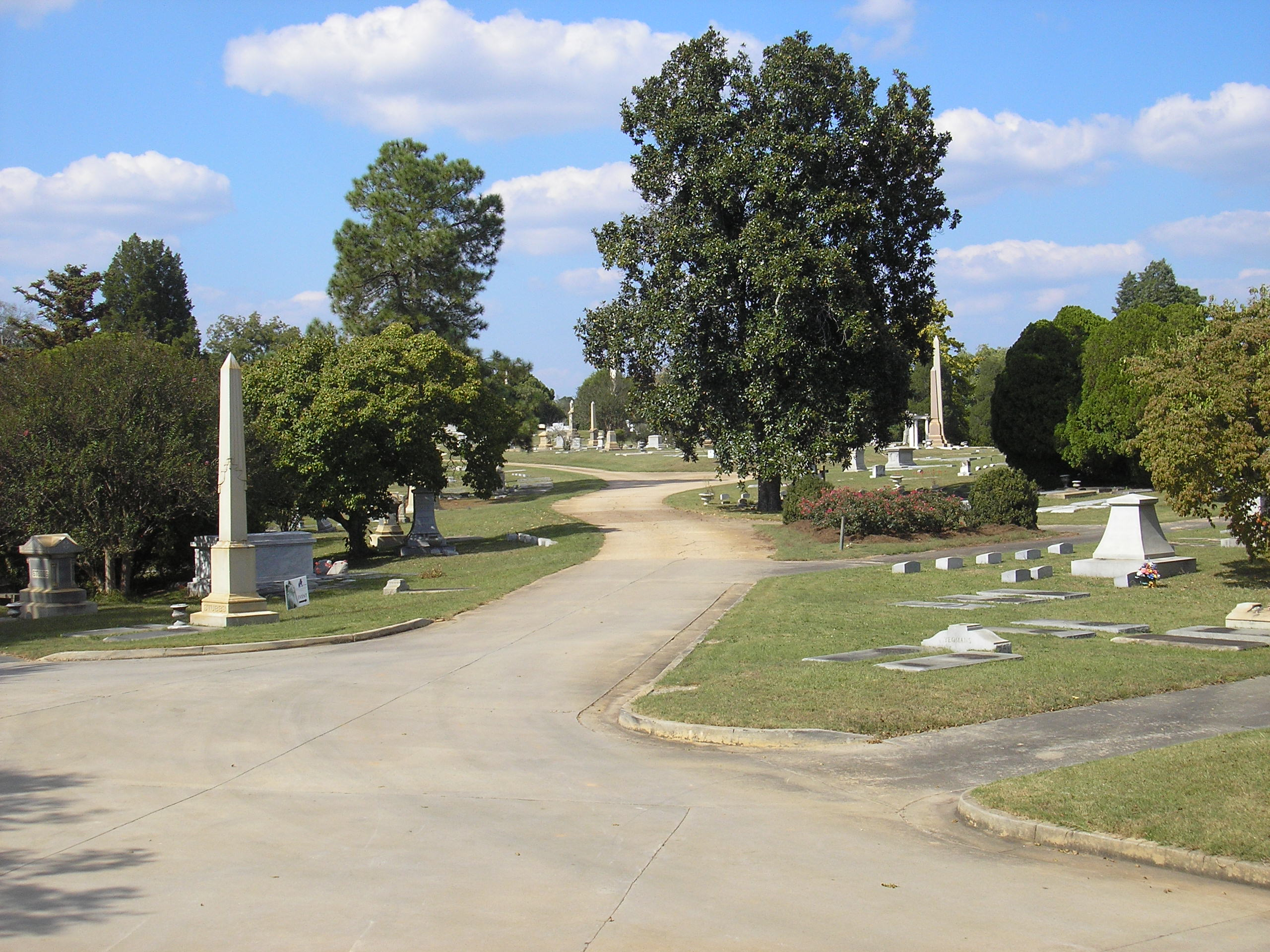

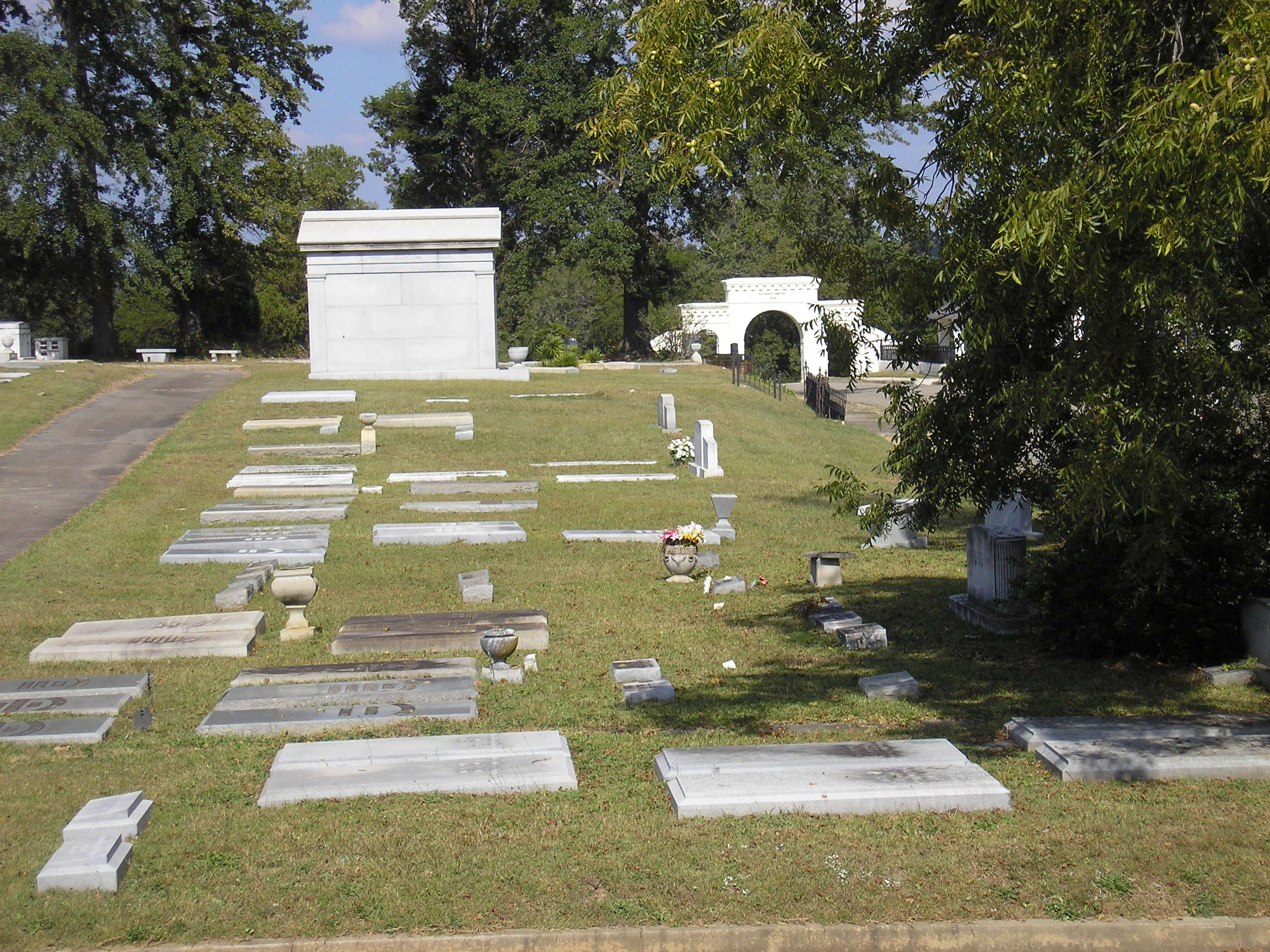

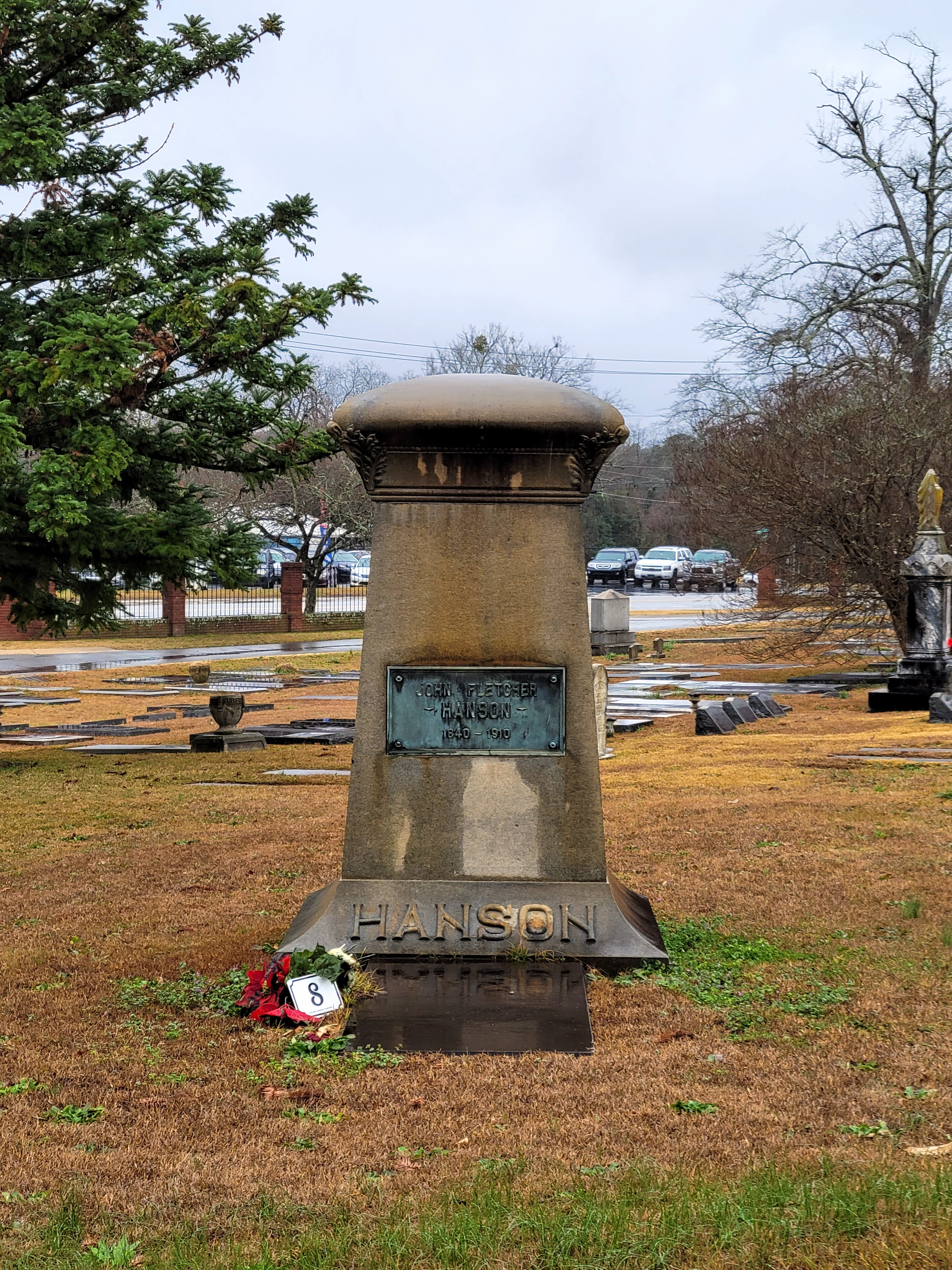
John Fletcher Hanson grave – February 2022

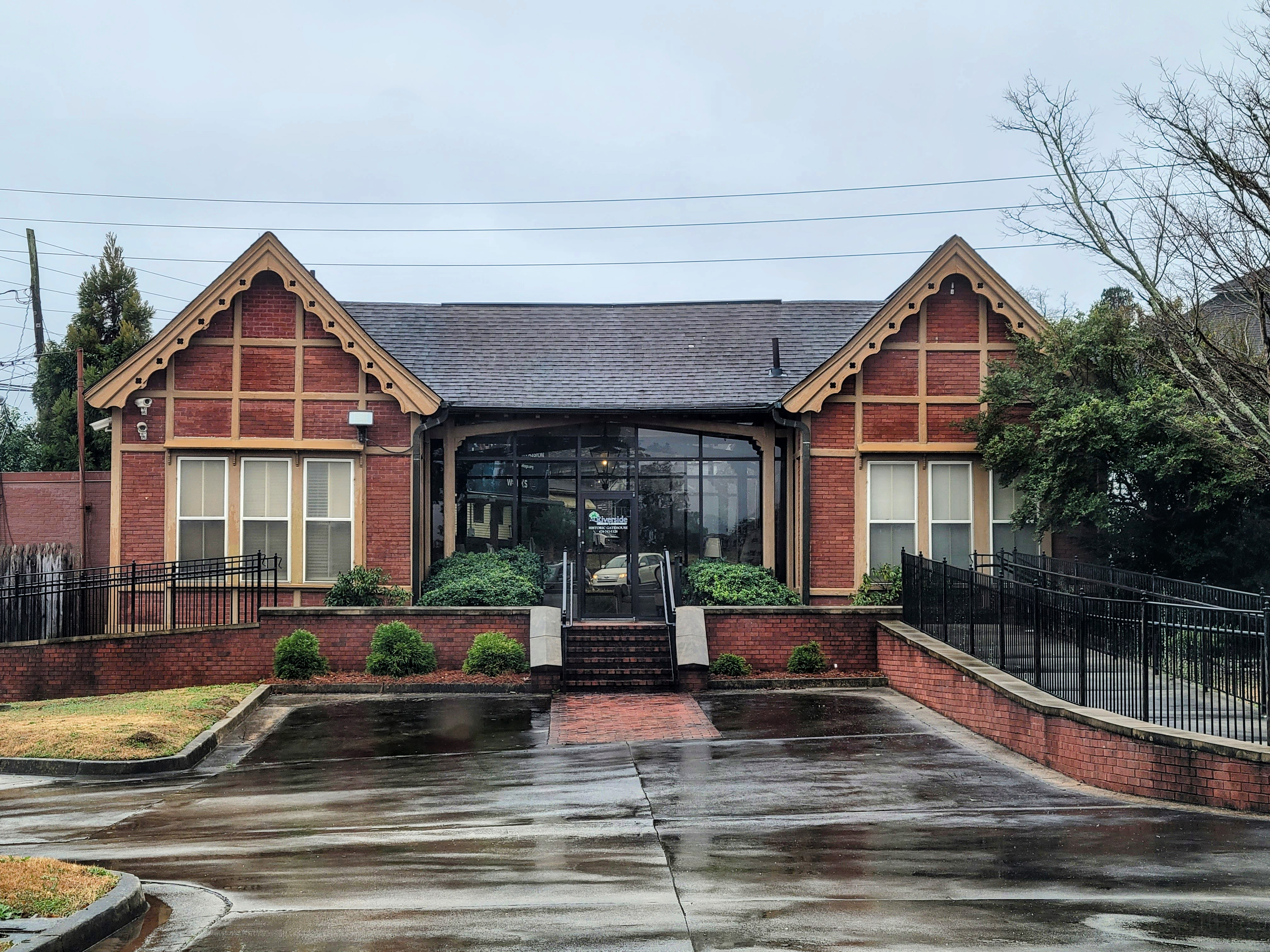
Gate House – February 2022
