= Messer (surname) =

Messer is a surname. It may refer to:

== People ==
- Alf Messer (1900–1947), English footballer
- Casey Messer (born 1983), 2007 Miss New Mexico USA
- Dale Messer (born 1937), American football player
- David Messer, 21st century Australian cartoonist
- Don Messer (1909–1973), Canadian musician, band leader and radio broadcaster, host of the television program Don Messer’s Jubilee
- Donald E. Messer (born 1941), American United Methodist theologian and author
- Erica Messer, 21st century American television writer, producer and story editor
- Frank Messer (1925–2001), American sportscaster
- Glenn Messer (1895–1995), American aviation pioneer
- Jonathan Messer (born 1976), Australian director
- Judy Messer (1933–2023), Australian conservationist
- Ken Messer (1931–2018), British painter
- Liesbeth Messer-Heijbroek (1914–2007), Dutch sculptor and medal maker
- Luke Messer (born 1969), American politician
- Mary Burt Messer (1881-1960), American educator, social worker, and writer
- Michael Messer (born 1956), English musician and record producer
- Robert Messer (1887–1918), Scottish footballer
- Sam Messer (born 1955), American painter
- Samuel Messer, birth name of American actor Robert Middleton (1911–1977)
- Sarah Messer (born 1966), American poet and author
- Sytia Messer, American basketball coach
- Thomas M. Messer (1920–2013), director of the Solomon R. Guggenheim Foundation 1961–1988

== Fictional characters ==
- Danny Messer, on the television series CSI: NY
