= Messier (automobile) =

French automobile manufacturer

Automobiles Messier
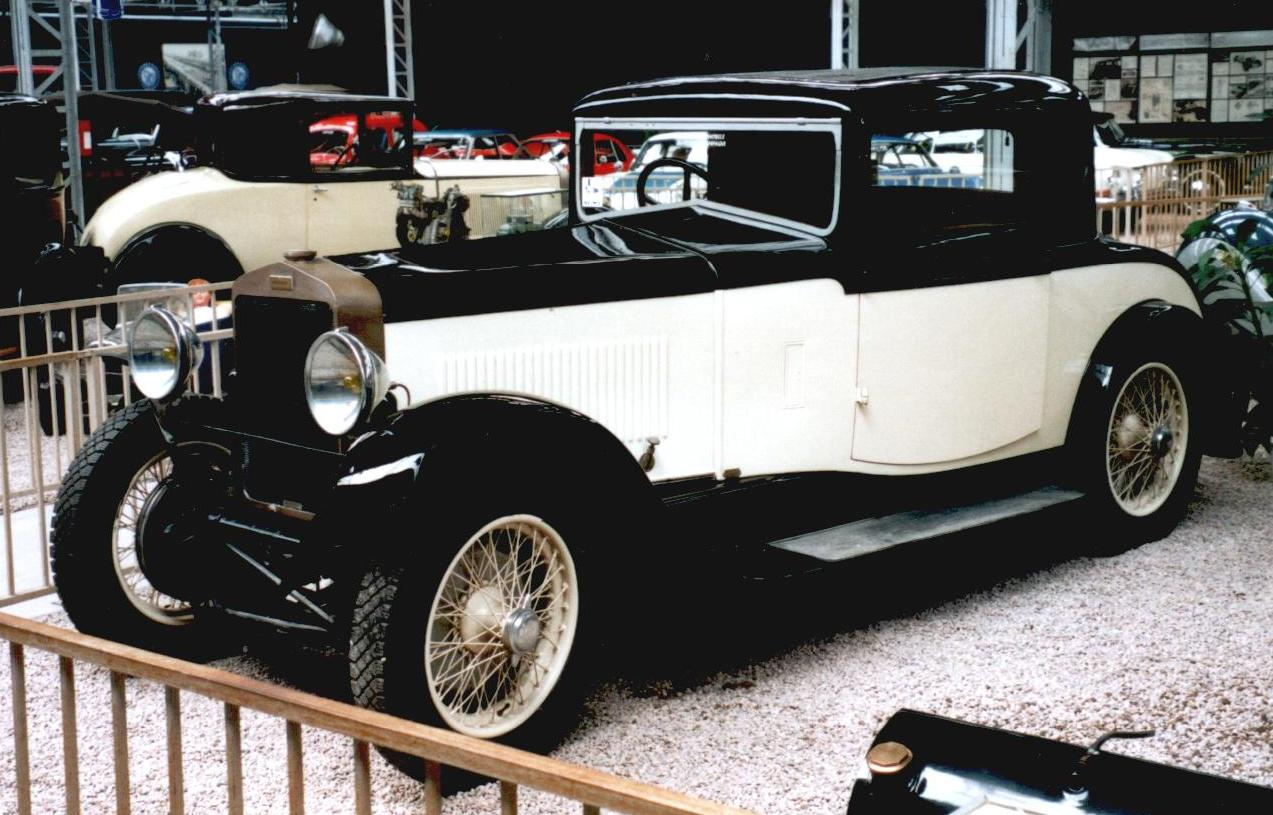
- Industry: Manufacturing
- Founded: 1925 (as an automobile manufacturer)
- Defunct: 1931
- Headquarters: Montrouge, Paris, France
- Key people: George Messier
- Products: Automobiles, pneumatic engineering (subsequently) aircraft landing gear

Messier was a French automobile manufacturer, based at Montrouge, on the southern edge of Paris, from 1925 till 1931.

== Origins ==
George Messier owned a factory for "pneumatic equipment" at least as early as 1920. He also developed a type of air suspension for automobiles. In 1920 he created the company Messier Automobiles and marketed the air suspension. From 1925 he produced automobiles on his own account, using the Messier name. In 1931 Messier abandoned automobile production in order to concentrate primarily on aircraft landing gear after having built and flown the Messier Monoplace Laboratorie monoplane, to test a retractable bicycle type undercarriage.

At least one source claims that Messier's air suspension was the basis for the revolutionary Hydropneumatic suspension of later Citroën models including, most notably, the 1955 DS. The inventor of the Hydropneumatic suspension, Paul Magès, was born in 1908, so it is feasible that he had heard of the Messier system, but rather than air, Magès used compressed nitrogen as the springing mechanism and pressurized oil for damping.

== The cars ==
The notable feature of the cars was their air suspension. The engines were bought from specialist engine manufacturers. The first cars used a 4-cylinder engine from CIME. There was a racing model powered by a 1,494 cc (91.2 cu in) overhead camshaft unit while Touring and Limousine bodied 4-cylinder cars were fitted with a 1,598 cc (97.5 cu in) overhead camshaft unit. In October 1924 the manufacturer took a stand at the 19th Paris Motor Show, preparing to market his small cars during the 1925 model year. They were advertised as "voitures sans ressorts" (cars without springs), highlighting the unconventional pneumatic suspension. In place of springs the cars featured above each front wheel pneumatic tubes of compressed air, each of 6 cm (2.4 in) diameter. Similar tubes were fixed in place of the rear suspension, shorter than the tubes at the front, but also slightly thicker, each having a 7 cm (2.8 in) diameter.

By October 1928, it was clear from the cars exhibited on the Messier stand at the 22nd Paris Motor Show that the manufacturer had "changed class". There were 6-cylinder cars with engine capacities of 2,770 cc (169 cu in) and 3,310 cc (202 cu in) and 8-cylinder models of 3,692 cc (225.3 cu in) developing 20 CV (15 kW; 20 hp) and 4,850 cc (296 cu in) producing 30 CV (22 kW; 30 hp). The largest engines came from Lycoming Engines of Pennsylvania, while engines from other American suppliers were also used.

The 8-cylinder "Messier Type H" was offered with two alternative wheelbase lengths of respectively 3.4 m (130 in) and 3.6 m (140 in). Many of the 50 built were fitted with ambulance bodies.

== Reading list ==
- Harald Linz, Halwart Schrader: Die Internationale Automobil-Enzyklopädie. United Soft Media Verlag, München 2008, ISBN 978-3-8032-9876-8. (German)
- George Nick Georgano (Chefredakteur): The Beaulieu Encyclopedia of the Automobile. Volume 3: P–Z. Fitzroy Dearborn Publishers, Chicago 2001, ISBN 1-57958-293-1. (English)
- George Nick Georgano: Autos. Encyclopédie complète. 1885 à nos jours. Courtille, Paris 1975. (French)
