= Robert Hails =

United States Air Force general

- Born: January 20, 1923; Miami, Florida
- Died: March 16, 2012 (aged 89)
- Military career
- Rank: Lieutenant general

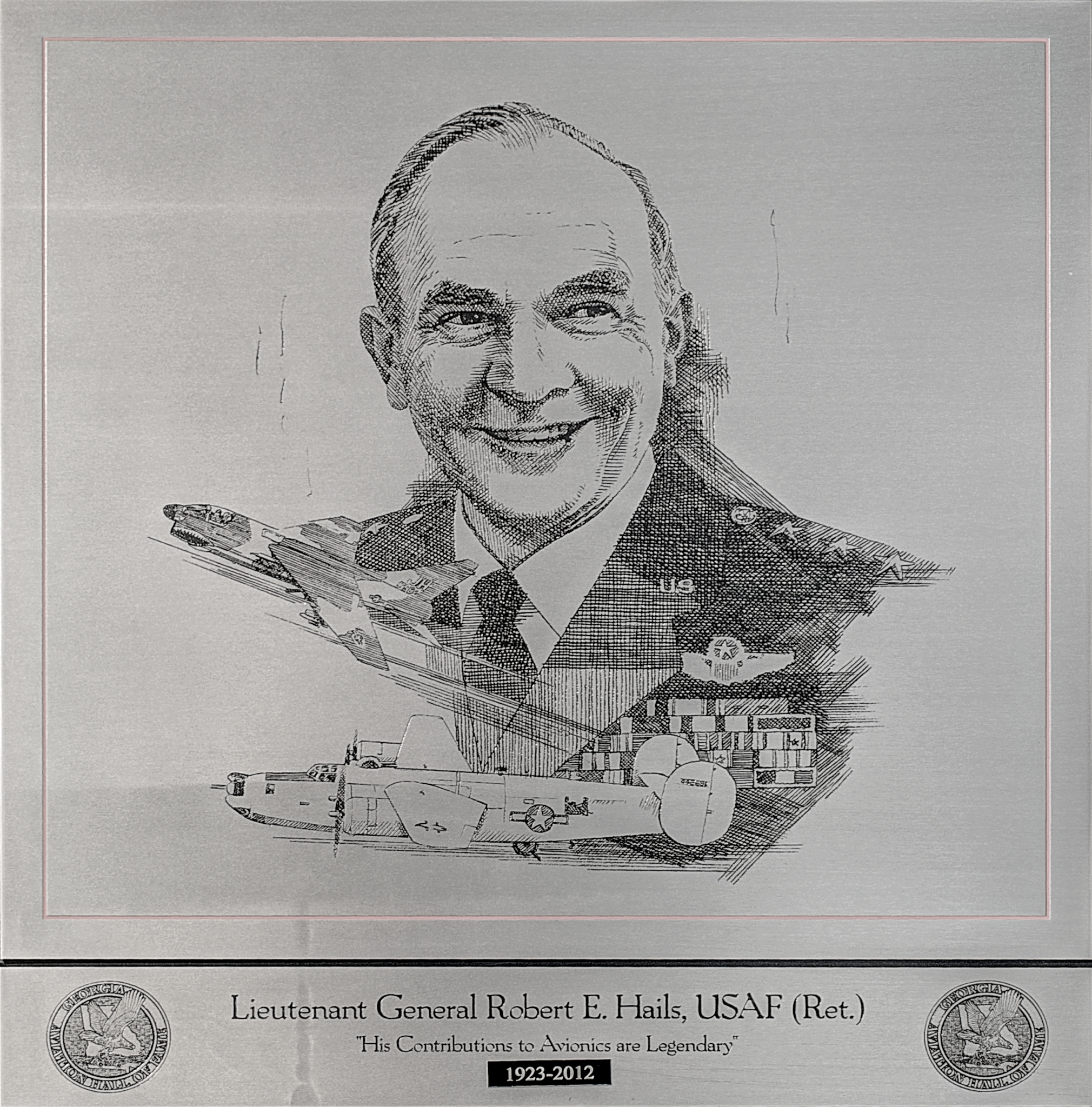
Plaque of Hails at the Georgia Aviation Hall of Fame

Robert E. Hails (January 20, 1923 – March 16, 2012) was an American military officer who served as the vice commander of Tactical Air Command, Air Force deputy chief of staff for systems and logistics at the Pentagon, and commander of the Warner Robins Air Logistics Center. He flew a B-24 during the Pacific Theater of World War II and later was one of the few to fly the SR-71 Blackbird. As the Director of Maintenance Engineering, Air Force Logistics Command, he was responsible for engineering and developing pilotless reconnaissance aircraft used during the Vietnam War.

Hails became a member of the Alabama Engineering Hall of Fame and the Georgia Aviation Hall of Fame and later worked for McDonnell Douglas and Vought Corporation.

He died in 2012.
