= Cuthbert A. Pattillo =

United States Air Force general

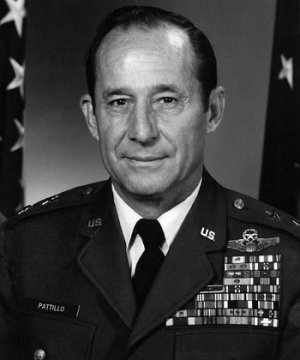
- Born: June 3, 1924; Atlanta, Georgia
- Died: February 20, 2014 (aged 89); Harrisonburg, Virginia
- Military career
- Allegiance: United States of America
- Branch: United States Air Force
- Service years: 1942–1980
- Rank: Major general
- Nickname: Bill
- Commands: Director of plans and policy, J-5, United States Readiness Command
- Awards: Distinguished Service Medal; Silver Star; Legion of Merit; Distinguished Flying Cross; Air Medal; Air Force Commendation Medal; Army Commendation Medal; Distinguished Unit Citation; Air Force Outstanding Unit Award; Croix de Guerre; Republic of Vietnam Honor Medal

Cuthbert Augustus "Bill" Pattillo (June 3, 1924 – February 20, 2014) was a major general in the United States Air Force who served as director of plans and policy for the United States Readiness Command at MacDill Air Force Base. Patillo was well known in the aviation community as a pioneer in jet aerobatic demonstration teams and was highly decorated as a fighter pilot, serving in World War II and the Vietnam War, and was a founding member of the Thunderbirds, the US Air Force Air Demonstration Squadron.

== Personal life ==
C.A. "Bill" Pattillo was born in Atlanta on June 3, 1924, along with his identical twin brother Charles C. "Buck" Pattillo, to Joseph W. and Pearl Pattillo. He graduated from Atlanta Technical High School in 1942. In 1950, he married his high school sweetheart Joyce Mathews, and together they had four children. He graduated from the University of Colorado Boulder with a bachelor's degree in mathematics in 1962 and George Washington University, with a master's degree in international affairs in 1965. He also graduated from the U.S. Army War College at Carlisle Barracks, Pa., in 1965. Pattillo was promoted to major general September 1, 1972 and he retired September 1, 1980. On February 20, 2014, he died at his home in Harrisonburg, Virginia, at the age of 89.

== Military service ==
=== World War II ===
In November 1942, Pattillo together with his twin brother enlisted in the U.S. Army Air Forces, later completing the aviation cadet program and receiving his pilot wings and commission as a second lieutenant at Marianna, Florida, in March 1944. He and his brother joined the 352nd Fighter Group in December 1944, flying P-51 Mustangs in the European Theater of Operations.

Pattillo flew 135 combat missions in World War II, engaging and shooting down a German Me 262, and destroying six other enemy aircraft. On April 16, 1945, while attacking Ganacker airfield and shortly after destroying two enemy aircraft, his P-51 Sweet and Lovely was shot down by anti-aircraft fire. Pattillo successfully bailed out and was then captured by the Germans and remained a POW until the end of the war.

At the end of World War II, Pattillo left the Army Air Forces to attend the Georgia Institute of Technology. While a student he was commander of an F-47 flight with the 54th Fighter Wing of the Georgia National Guard.

=== Post War Service and USAF Thunderbirds ===
He was recalled to active duty in March 1948 and assigned as a jet pilot to the 31st Tactical Fighter Wing at Turner Air Force Base, Ga. In January 1949 he was assigned to the 36th Tactical Fighter Wing at Fürstenfeldbruck Air Base, Germany, flying F-80s and F-84s. While in Europe he helped form and flew on the U.S. Air Forces in Europe-North Atlantic Treaty Organization aerial demonstration team, the "Skyblazers".

In October 1952 he was assigned as a fighter gunnery instructor with the 3542nd Flying Training Squadron at Pinecastle Air Force Base, Fla. In March 1953 he went to Luke Air Force Base, Ariz., as a gunnery instructor with his twin brother, now Lieutenant General Charles C. Pattillo, U.S. Air Force, who is vice director of the Joint Deployment Agency which is collocated with the U.S. Readiness Command. Together they were instrumental in forming the Thunderbirds, the first U.S. Air Force official aerial demonstration team. Pattillo flew right wing and his brother flew left wing in the original team in 1953. Pattillo was assigned as commander of the 3603rd Combat, Crew Training Squadron at Luke Air Force Base in June 1954.

In November 1955 he assumed duties as air operations officer with the 613th Tactical Fighter Squadron, 401st Tactical Fighter Wing at England Air Force Base, La., and in December 1956 served a six-month temporary tour of duty as Ninth Air Force liaison officer with Tactical Air Command rotational units at Aviano Air Base, Italy. He returned to England Air Force Base in June 1957 and served briefly with the 401st Fighter-Bomber Group as operations officer and in September 1957 became commander of the 615th Tactical Fighter Squadron.

In September 1959 Pattillo entered the University of Colorado, under the Air Force Institute of Technology program, and graduated in January 1962 with a degree in mathematics. In February 1962 he was assigned to the 4450th Standardization and Evaluation Group at Langley Air Force Base, Va.

In August 1964 he attended the U.S. Army War College. Pattillo returned to Germany in August 1965 and served as deputy commander for operations with the 50th Tactical Fighter Wing, Hahn Air Base. In February 1967 he became director of safety for the U.S. Air Forces in Europe at Lindsey Air Station, Germany.

=== Vietnam War ===
Pattillo transferred to the Republic of Vietnam in August 1968 as vice commander of the 3rd Tactical Fighter Wing at Bien Hoa Air Base. In October 1968 he assumed duties as vice commander of the 31st Tactical Fighter Wing at Tuy Hoa Air Base. In February 1969, Pattillo became the commander of the 31st Tactical Fighter Wing.

=== Military command ===
Returning to the United States in October 1969, the general was assigned to Headquarters Tactical Air Command at Langley Air Force Base as assistant deputy chief of staff, plans, and in December 1970 become assistant deputy chief of staff, operations. In September 1972 Pattillo was assigned to Headquarters U.S. Air Force, Washington, D.C., as deputy director of operations in the Office of the Deputy Chief of Staff, Plans and Operations, and assumed duties as director of operations in February 1973.

In May 1974 Pattillo was assigned to Allied Forces Central Europe as the deputy chief of staff for operations and intelligence and senior U.S. representative. The general was transferred to MacDill Air Force Base in July 1977.

Pattillo was a highly decorated command pilot with more than 5,000 flying hours.

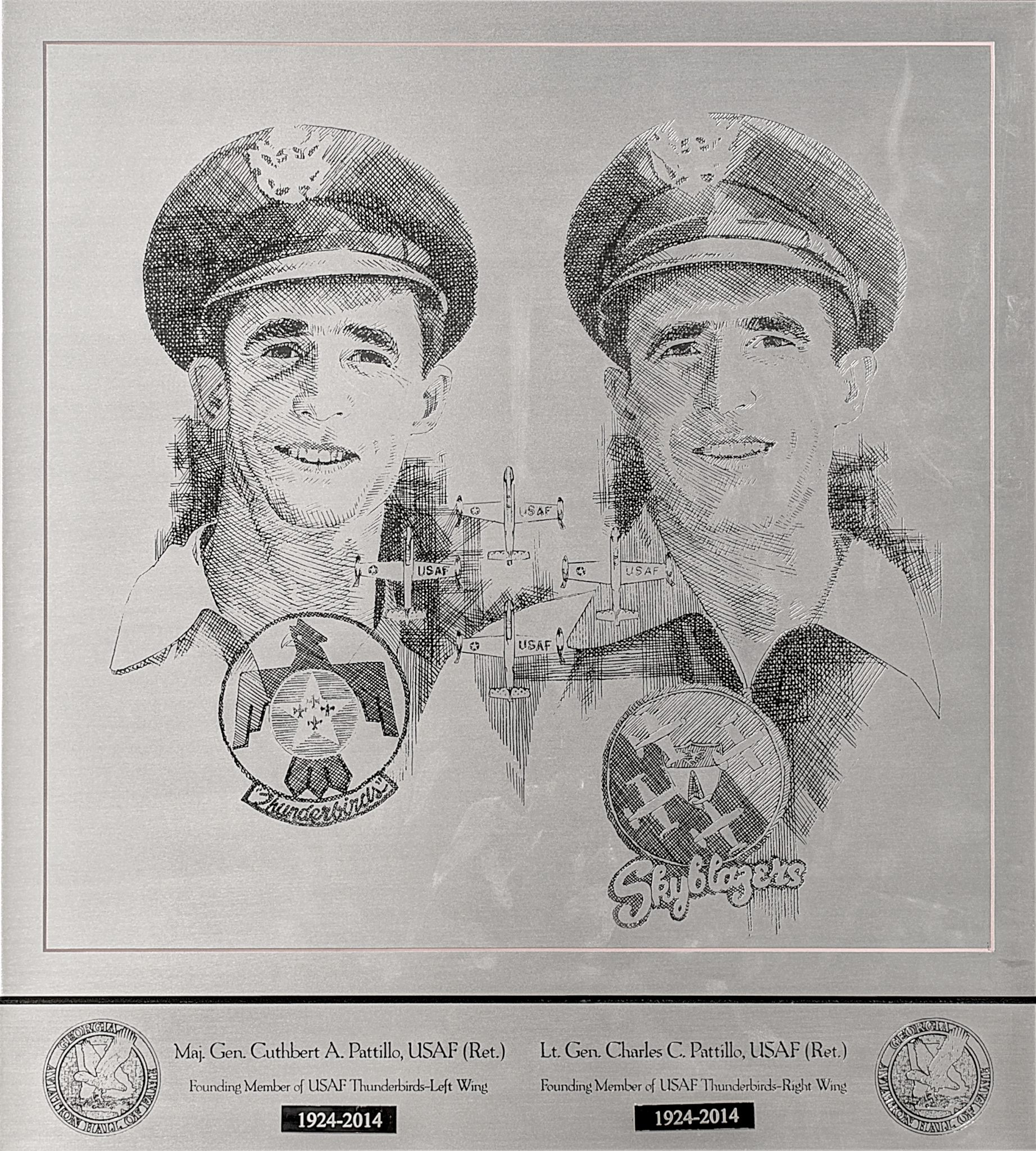
Plaque of Pattillo (left) and Charles C. Pattillo at the Georgia Aviation Hall of Fame

Pattillo and his twin brother were both inducted into the Georgia Aviation Hall of Fame in 2000.

== Awards and decorations ==
U.S. Air Force Command Pilot Badge

Personal decorations
	Air Force Distinguished Service Medal with oak leaf cluster
	Silver Star
Width-44 crimson ribbon with a pair of width-2 white stripes on the edges	Legion of Merit with two oak leaf clusters
	Distinguished Flying Cross with oak leaf cluster
	Air Medal with 13 oak leaf clusters
	Air Force Commendation Medal with oak leaf cluster
Width-44 myrtle green ribbon with width-3 white stripes at the edges and five width-1 stripes down the center; the central white stripes are width-2 apart	Army Commendation Medal
	Distinguished Unit Citation emblem with oak leaf cluster
	Air Force Outstanding Unit Award
	Croix de Guerre with palm
	Republic of Vietnam Honor Medal, 1st class
