= Glenn Messer =

American aviation pioneer (1895–1995)

Glenn Edmund Messer (July 12, 1895 – June 13, 1995) was an American aviation pioneer, responsible for major advances in the use and modification of existing aircraft and in the design and construction of aircraft and aircraft instruments.

== Biography ==
He was born in Henry County, Iowa, on July 12, 1895.

He began his flying career by taking lessons on a Wright biplane from aviator George Gustafson in Bay City, Michigan. He and fellow pilot Jack Turner completed a successful demonstration U. S. Air Mail flight from Birmingham's Roberts Field to Marr Field in Chattanooga, Tennessee, on March 24, 1925, under a temporary commission. Messer recreated that flight on its 50th anniversary in 1975.

Messer operated Birmingham Municipal Airport in Birmingham, Alabama, with Edward Stinson. He later operated Messer Field. In 1927 he started the Southern Aircraft Corporation which designed and built the Air Boss. He later started The Glenn E. Messer Company of Birmingham.

He died on June 13, 1995, in Birmingham, Alabama.

== Legacy ==
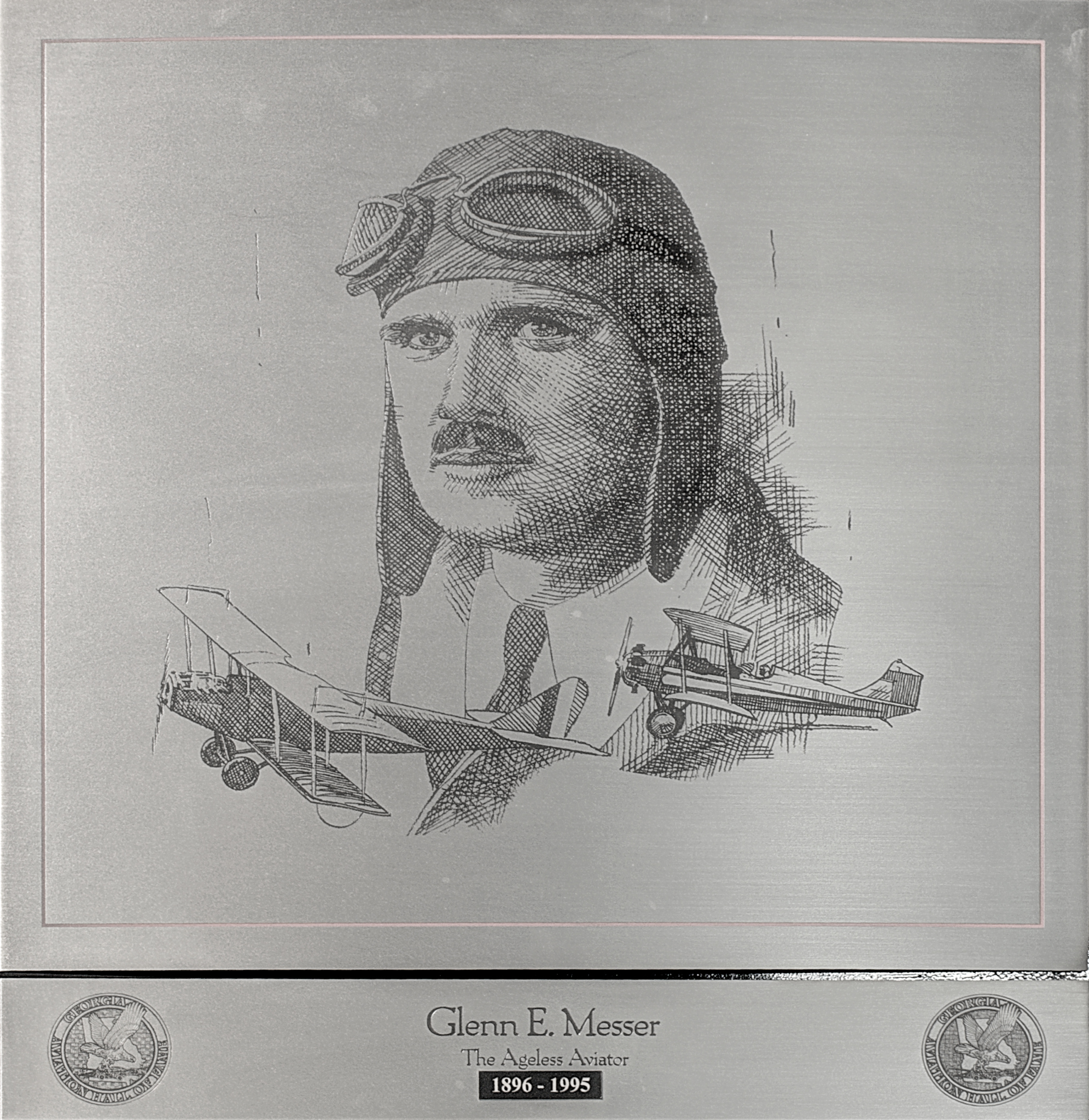
Plaque of Messer at the Georgia Aviation Hall of Fame

The highway from 5th Avenue North in downtown Birmingham to the airport was named the Glenn E. Messer Airport Highway in his honor. In 1991 he was inducted into the Georgia Aviation Hall of Fame.
