= Robert Messer =

Scottish footballer

Personal information
- Full name: Robert Messer
- Date of birth: 18 July 1887
- Place of birth: Edinburgh, Scotland
- Date of death: 16 October 1918 (aged 31)
- Place of death: near Ypres, Belgium
- Position: Outside right

Senior career*
| Years | Team | Apps | (Gls) |
- Broxburn Shamrock
- King's Park
- Bo'ness
| 1910 | Leicester Fosse | 2 | (0) |
- Broxburn Shamrock
- Broxburn United
- East Fife
- * Club domestic league appearances and goals

Robert Messer (18 July 1887 – 16 October 1918) was a Scottish professional footballer who played in the Football League for Leicester Fosse as an outside right. He was described as "a fine wing player who is very fast and centres well."

== Personal life ==
As of 1901, Messer was working as a printer's apprentice. He served as a private in the King's Own Scottish Borderers during the First World War and was killed in action near Ypres during the Battle of Courtrai on 16 October 1918. Messer is commemorated on the Tyne Cot Memorial. In 2011, Messer's British War Medal and Victory Medal were purchased by Leicester City; they are now exhibited in King Power Stadium's reception area.

== Career statistics ==
Appearances and goals by club, season and competition
| Club | Season | League | | | FA Cup | | Total | |
| Club | Season | Division | Apps | Goals | Apps | Goals | Apps | Goals |
|---|---|---|---|---|---|---|---|---|
| Leicester Fosse | 1910–11 | Second Division | 2 | 0 | 0 | 0 | 2 | 0 |
| Career total | | | 2 | 0 | 0 | 0 | 2 | 0 |
