= Marion Stegeman Hodgson =

American military pilot

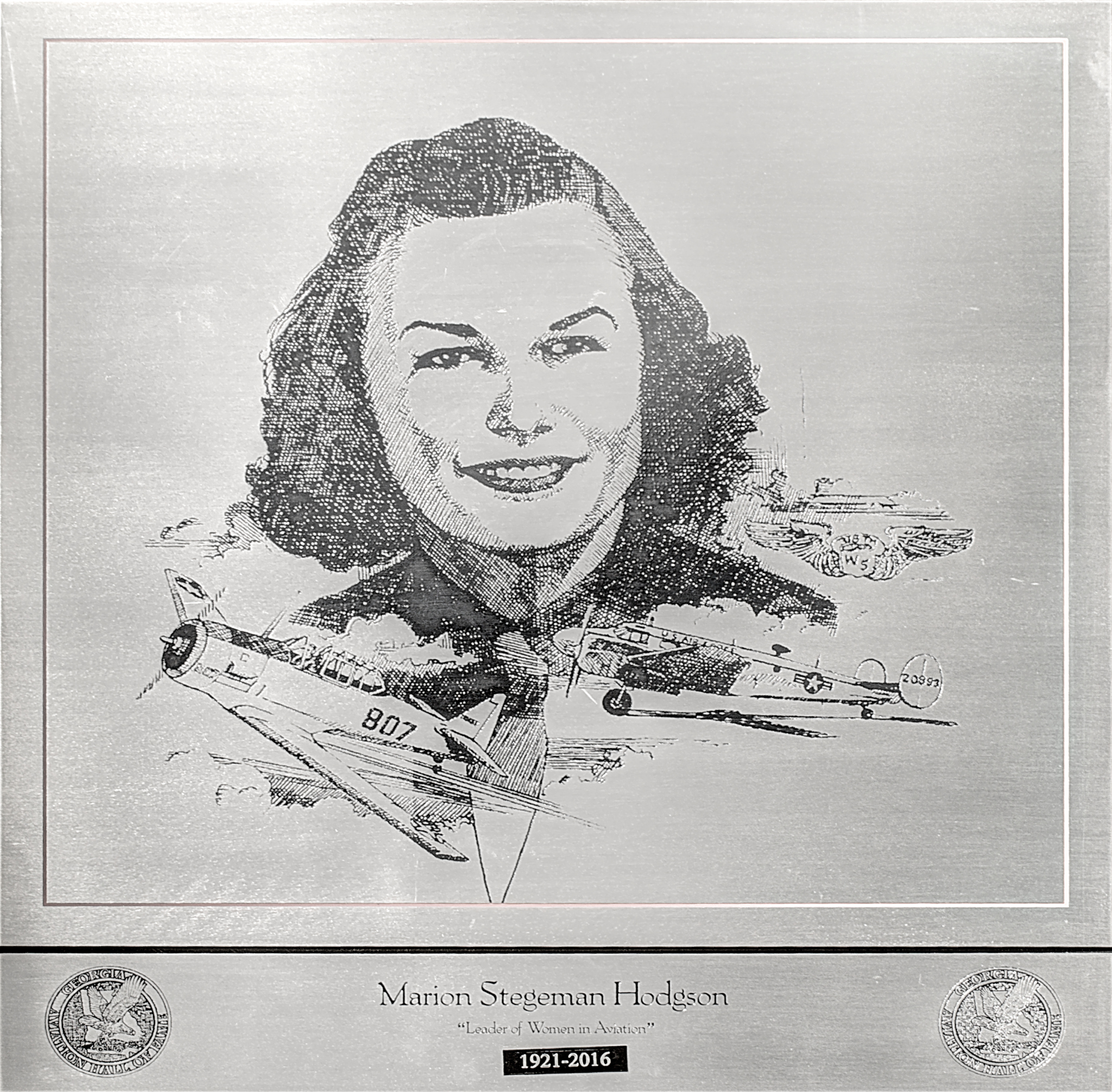
- Marion Stegeman Hodgson's plaque at the Museum of Aviation (Warner Robins).
- Born: Marion Stegeman Hodgson; December 16, 1921; Athens, Georgia
- Died: 24 March 2016 (aged 94); Wichita Falls, Texas
- Education: University of Georgia (BA)
- Occupations: Pilot, Author
- Known for: Member of Women Airforce Service Pilots
- Spouse: Lt. Col. Edward "Ned" Hodgson

Marion Stegeman Hodgson (1921-2016) was one of the first women to train as a military pilot in the United States. Her 1996 autobiography Winning My Wings: A Woman Airforce Service Pilot in World War II was praised for its unique insight into the Women Airforce Service Pilots program in World War II. Her post-war work writing for magazines and newspapers helped bring to attention the fact that Women Airforce Service Pilots were never considered veterans of the war. Hodgson has been inducted into aviation halls of fame in Texas and Georgia.

== Biography ==
Marion Foster Stegeman Hodgson was born in Athens, Georgia, in 1921 to Dorothea and Herman Stegeman. Her father served as the head football coach at the University of Georgia at the time of her birth. She was in attendance at the inaugural football game at Sanford Stadium. Early in her life Hodgson suffered from aviophobia, which she contributed to her decision to pursue a pilot license. In her autobiography Winning My Wings she details her first flying experience:

When the pilot started up the engines, there was such a terrifying roar that I clapped my hands over my ears and bellowed. My father – my hero, my comforter – took me on his lap and held me close to make me feel safe, but for the only time in my life, it didn’t work. As we taxied out to take-off position, my screams grew louder, until the pilot was forced to turn the plane back and let me off.

Hodgson described her fear of flying even into the 1940s as "near-pathological."

=== Pre-military ===
In the spring of 1941, Hodgson's senior year at the University of Georgia, she was selected for the Civilian Pilot Training Program. Hodgson graduated from the University of Georgia in 1941 with a Bachelor of Arts in journalism. She trained in a Piper J3F Cub, earning her license in June 1941. Later that summer Hodgson taught herself shorthand and how to type so that she could apply for a job. She worked as a receptionist for the Georgia Tech athletic department. She later worked as a stenographer for the Federal Reserve Bank of Atlanta, where she was working overtime on the day of the Attack on Pearl Harbor. In 1942 she moved to Chicago where she worked for the Federal Reserve Bank of Chicago.

=== Military career ===
On February 18, 1943, Marion was selected by Jacqueline Cochran to enter Air Force training and became a volunteer for the Women Airforce Service Pilots (WASP) program where she trained at Avenger Field in Sweetwater, Texas, for six months. At one point during the training program she became squadron commander for a junior class. After graduating, she was moved to The 5th Ferrying Group, stationed at Love Field, where she piloted single and multi-engine aircraft to transport trainers and planes from factories to air bases across the country. She was once on board a Douglas DC-3 airliner, alongside other ferry pilots, which lost both engines shortly after take off but managed to land safely back at LaGuardia Airport in New York City.

=== Later life and legacy ===
Immediately following World War II she married Ned Hodgson and they moved to Fort Worth, Texas. As a stay-at-home mother, she wrote articles for magazines and newspapers, including the Fort Worth Star-Telegram, mainly focusing on the WASP program. Her work writing about women pilots has been credited with bringing attention to the fact that WASPs were not considered veterans of the war. WASPs were eventually granted veteran status in 1977, and were awarded the Congressional Gold Medal in 2009. She was inducted into the Texas Aviation Hall of Fame at the Lone Star Flight Museum in 2004 and the Hall of Fame at the Museum of Aviation in 2006. Hodgson was also a long time member of the Wichita Falls Chapter Ninety-Nines. She died March 24, 2016, in Wichita Falls, Texas.

== Personal life ==
In 1944 she married Lt. Col. Edward "Ned" Hodgson, a marine pilot and family friend of the Stegemans who was severely burned in an airplane crash in 1943. She sent him letters while he was in the hospital, unexpected to live, to lift his spirits. They sent letters back and forth throughout her Ferrying Squadron service, many of which are compiled in Winning My Wings, eventually falling in love. They had three children.
