= Charles C. Pattillo =

American Air Force lieutenant general (1924–2019)

Charles C. "Buck" Pattillo
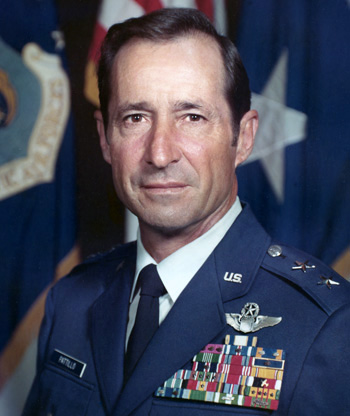
- "Buck" Pattillo, pictured as a Major General
- Born: June 3, 1924; Atlanta, Georgia, U.S.
- Died: May 20, 2019 (aged 94); Spotsylvania County, Virginia, U.S.
- Military career
- Allegiance: United States of America
- Branch: United States Air Force
- Service years: 1942–1981
- Rank: Lieutenant General
- Nickname: Buck
- Commands: Deputy commander in chief, U.S. Readiness Command
- Conflicts: World War II; Vietnam War
- Awards: Distinguished Service Medal with oak leaf cluster Legion of Merit with three oak leaf clusters Distinguished Flying Cross with oak leaf cluster Air Medal with 10 oak leaf clusters, Army Commendation Medal; Distinguished Unit Citation emblem with oak leaf cluster Republic of Vietnam Campaign Medal; Republic of Vietnam Air Force Distinguished Service Order 2nd Class; French Croix de Guerre with palm

Charles Curtis Pattillo (June 3, 1924 – May 20, 2019), also known as Buck Pattillo, was an American Air Force lieutenant general who was deputy commander in chief, U.S. Readiness Command and vice director of the Joint Deployment Agency with headquarters at MacDill Air Force Base, Florida. He died in May 2019 at the age of 94.

== Early life ==
Pattillo was born in June 1924 in Atlanta. He was the twin brother of fellow US Air Force major general, Cuthbert A. Pattillo, with whom he was born 7 minutes apart. He graduated from Atlanta Technical High School in 1942. He received a bachelor of science degree in mathematics from the University of Colorado at Boulder, Colorado, in 1962 and a master's degree in international affairs from The George Washington University, Washington, D.C., in 1965.

== World War II ==
In November 1942 he enlisted in the Army Air Forces as an aviation cadet. Following intensive training at various bases in the Southeastern Training Command, he received his pilot wings and a commission as second lieutenant in March 1944 He next trained in P-40s and in November 1944 went to the European theater of operations where he flew combat missions with the 352nd Fighter Group, Eighth Air Force. While with the 352nd Group he earned the Distinguished Flying Cross and the Air Medal with two oak leaf clusters.

== Post war service ==
Pattillo was released from active duty in December 1945 and enrolled in the Georgia School of Technology. There he actively participated in the reserve military program flying, P-47s with the 128th Fighter Squadron, 54th Fighter Wing of the Georgia Air National Guard.

In February 1948 Pattillo was recalled to active military duty as a P-51 fighter pilot with the 31st Fighter Group, Turner Air Force Base, Ga. Eleven months later he was assigned to the 22nd Fighter Squadron, 36th Tactical Fighter Wing, Fürstenfeldbruck Air Base, Germany.

While at Fürstenfeldbruck he assisted in organizing the U.S. Air Forces in Europe aerial demonstration team, the Skyblazers. He flew left wing and alternate lead for the Skyblazers as they demonstrated their aerial skills in F-80 and F-84 aircraft in more than 250 air shows throughout Western Europe, North Africa, Greece and Turkey. For exceptionally meritorious performance with the Skyblazers he was awarded the Legion of Merit.

In August 1952 Pattillo was assigned to the Air Training Command's 3600th Combat Crew Training Group at Luke Air Force Base, Ariz. In 1953 he helped organize and then flew left wing for the original U.S. Air Force demonstration team, the Thunderbirds. In February 1954 he returned to the 3600th Combat Crew Training Group to become squadron operations officer, squadron commander and then group operations officer.

From July 1956 to August 1959, Pattillo served with the 366th and then the 401st Tactical Fighter Wings, England Air Force Base, Louisiana, as a tactical fighter squadron commander. While at England he flew the F-84F and F-100D and his squadron participated in numerous deployments to Europe as elements of the Composite Air Strike Force and as a tactical rotational squadron. From September 1959 to February 1962, Pattillo attended the University of Colorado.

In March 1962 he transferred to Langley Air Force Base, Virginia, as chief, Jet Fighter-Reconnaissance Division, 4450th Standardization and Evaluation Group, Headquarters Tactical Air Command. In August 1964 he attended the U.S. Army War College, Carlisle Barracks, Pa., and simultaneously studied at the George Washington University Graduate School.

In August 1965 Pattillo was assigned to Headquarters Seventeenth Air Force, Ramstein Air Base, Germany, as director of offense operations. In March 1967 he moved to Bitburg Air Base, Germany, to command the 36th Tactical Fighter Wing. In March 1968 he went to Southeast Asia as vice commander of the 8th Tactical Fighter Wing, Ubon Royal Thai Air Force Base, Thailand, and assumed command of the wing in July 1968. He flew 120 combat missions in F-4 Phantoms.

Pattillo went to Tinker Air Force Base, Oklahoma, in July 1969 as vice commander of the Oklahoma City Air Materiel Area. In November 1971 he became deputy director for logistics, J-4, Organization of the Joint Chiefs of Staff, Washington, D.C.

He became commander of the Lowry Technical Training Center at Lowry Air Force Base, Colo., in September 1973 and vice commander in chief, Pacific Air Forces, in September 1975.

Pattillo became deputy commander in chief, U.S. Readiness Command in March 1979. He was named vice director of the Joint Deployment Agency in October 1979 and in January 1980 he assumed the added duty of deputy commander in chief of U.S. Readiness Command.

== Awards and decorations ==
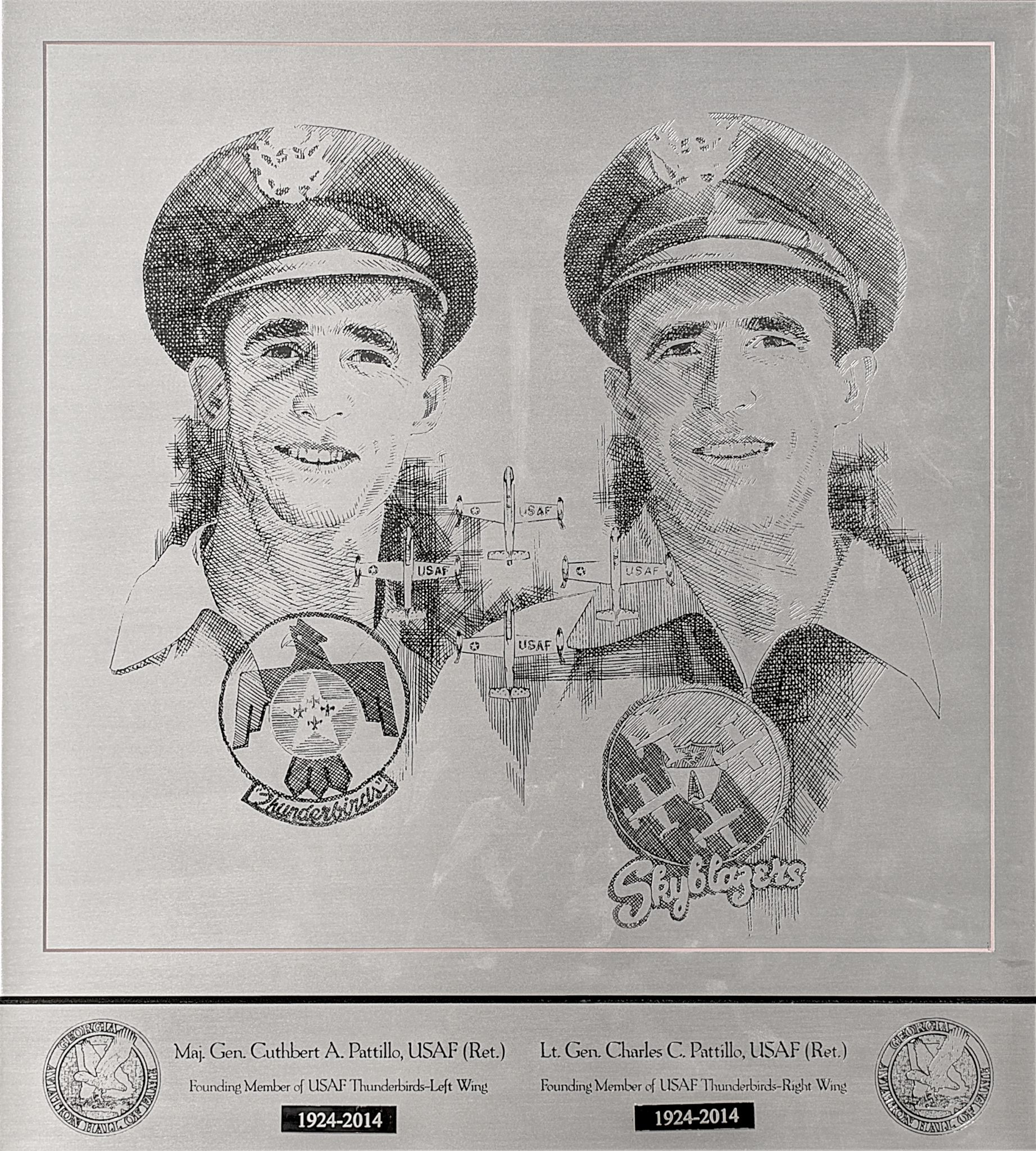
Plaque of Pattillo (right) and Cuthbert A. Pattillo at the Georgia Aviation Hall of Fame

Pattillo is a decorated command pilot and his military decorations and awards include the Distinguished Service Medal with oak leaf cluster, Legion of Merit with three oak leaf clusters, Distinguished Flying Cross with oak leaf cluster, Air Medal with 10 oak leaf clusters, Army Commendation Medal, Distinguished Unit Citation emblem with oak leaf cluster, Republic of Vietnam Campaign Medal, Republic of Vietnam Air Force Distinguished Service Order 2nd Class, and French Croix de Guerre with palm.

He was promoted to lieutenant general March 1, 1979, with date of rank February 28, 1979 and he retired June 1, 1981. He died at his home in Spotsylvania County, Virginia on May 20, 2019.

Pattillo and his twin brother were both inducted into the Georgia Aviation Hall of Fame in 2000.
