= George Messier =

French inventor (1896–1933)

George Messier (1896–1933) was a French inventor, best known as the pioneer of hydraulically-operated landing gear for aircraft. He also specialized in hydropneumatic suspensions.

== Biography ==
George Messier was a researcher in the chemical industry. In 1921, he studied pneumatic and oleopneumatic devices for shock absorption. In 1927, he founded, with Engineer René Lévy (1900-1993, later René Lucien-Lévy), son-in-law of Maurice Farman, the “Société française de matériel d'aviation” (French Aviation Equipment Company), specializing in landing gear and hydraulic systems for aviation.From 1925 to 1931, George Messier delivered more than 150 cars of his brand, the Messier “without springs.”

René Lévy owned a Farman F.200 aircraft, which he used to indulge in the new fashion of “tourist aviation,” visiting small, developing airfields such as the one in Évreux, where his landing in August 1929 from Toussus-le-Noble was noticed and reported by the specialized press. In May 1931, he accompanied his brother-in-law Marcel Farman to Deauville, where Farman landed his heavy 420 hp Farman aircraft on the barely completed runway, which was soggy and dotted with puddles, at the future Saint-Gatien-des-Bois airfield, which would not be inaugurated until the end of July. George Messier and René Lévy then entered the aeronautics industry, designing the Messier Laboratory Aircraft for the Landing gear of oleopneumatic suspension landing gear.
