= Willa Brown =

American aviator, educator, activist (1906–1992)

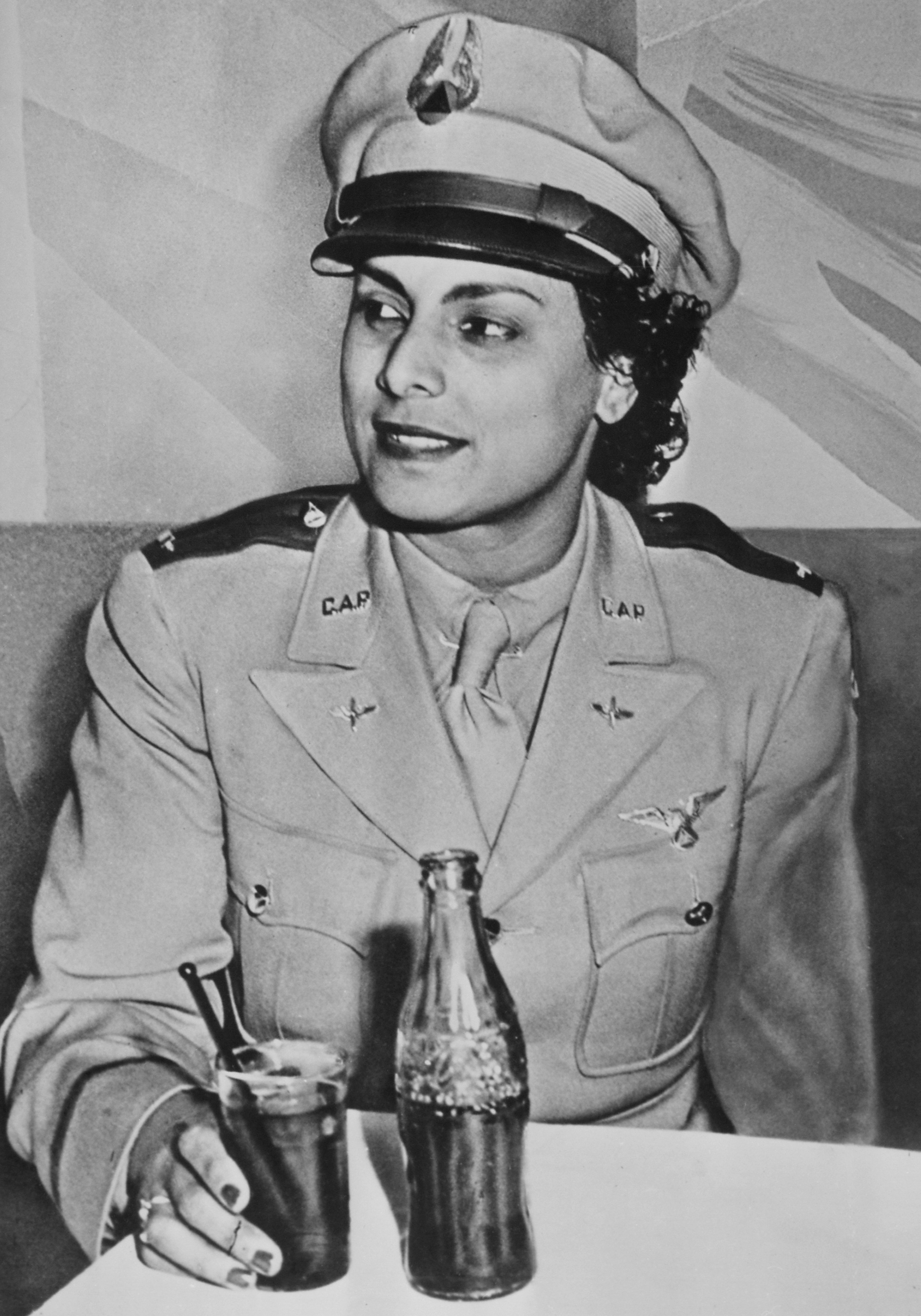
- Brown as a lieutenant in the United States Civil Air Patrol
- Born: January 22, 1906; Glasgow, Kentucky, US
- Died: July 18, 1992 (aged 86); Chicago, Illinois, US
- Other name: Willa Brown Chappell
- Occupations: Pilot, lobbyist, activist, teacher
- Known for: Civil rights leader First female African American pilot licensed in the United States; First African American officer in the United States Civil Air Patrol; First African American woman to run for United States Congress
- Spouses: Wilbur Hardaway (m. 1929; div. 1931) Cornelius Coffey (m. 1947, divorced) Rev. J. H. Chappell (m. 1955, died)

Willa Beatrice Brown (January 22, 1906 – July 18, 1992) was an American aviator, lobbyist, teacher, and civil rights activist. She was the first African American woman to earn a pilot's license in the United States, the first African American woman to run for the United States Congress, first African American officer in the Civil Air Patrol, and first woman in the U.S. to have both a pilot's license and an aircraft mechanic's license.

She was a lifelong advocate for gender and racial equality in the field of aviation as well as in the military. She not only lobbied the U.S. government to integrate the United States Army Air Corps and include African Americans in the Civilian Pilot Training Program (CPTP), she and Cornelius Coffey co-founded the Coffey School of Aeronautics, distinguishing it as the first private flight training academy owned and operated by African Americans in the United States. She trained hundreds of pilots, several of whom went on to become Tuskegee Airmen; the creation of the Tuskegee Airmen has been credited to Brown's training efforts.

Brown remained politically and socially active in Chicago long after the Coffey School closed in 1945. She ran in Congressional primary elections in 1946 and 1950 and taught in the Chicago Public School System until 1971, when she retired at age 65. Following her retirement, she served on the Federal Aviation Administration's Women's Advisory Committee until 1974.

== Early life ==
Willa Beatrice Brown was born to Eric and Hallie Brown on January 22, 1906, in Glasgow, Kentucky. When she was six, her family moved to Indianapolis, Indiana, but the family soon moved to Terre Haute, Indiana. Brown graduated from Sarah Scott Junior High in 1920, and Wiley High School in 1923. She attended Indiana State Teachers College where she graduated in 1927 with a bachelor's degree. Ten years later she earned an M.B.A. from Northwestern University.

Brown taught in Gary, Indiana, at Emerson High School's Roosevelt Annex from 1927 to 1932. She then moved to Chicago, where she worked in a variety of jobs, including secretarial work, social work, and teaching. In 1934, she met John C. Robinson, who introduced her to the Challenger Air Pilots Association, a group of African American pilots.

== Aviation career ==
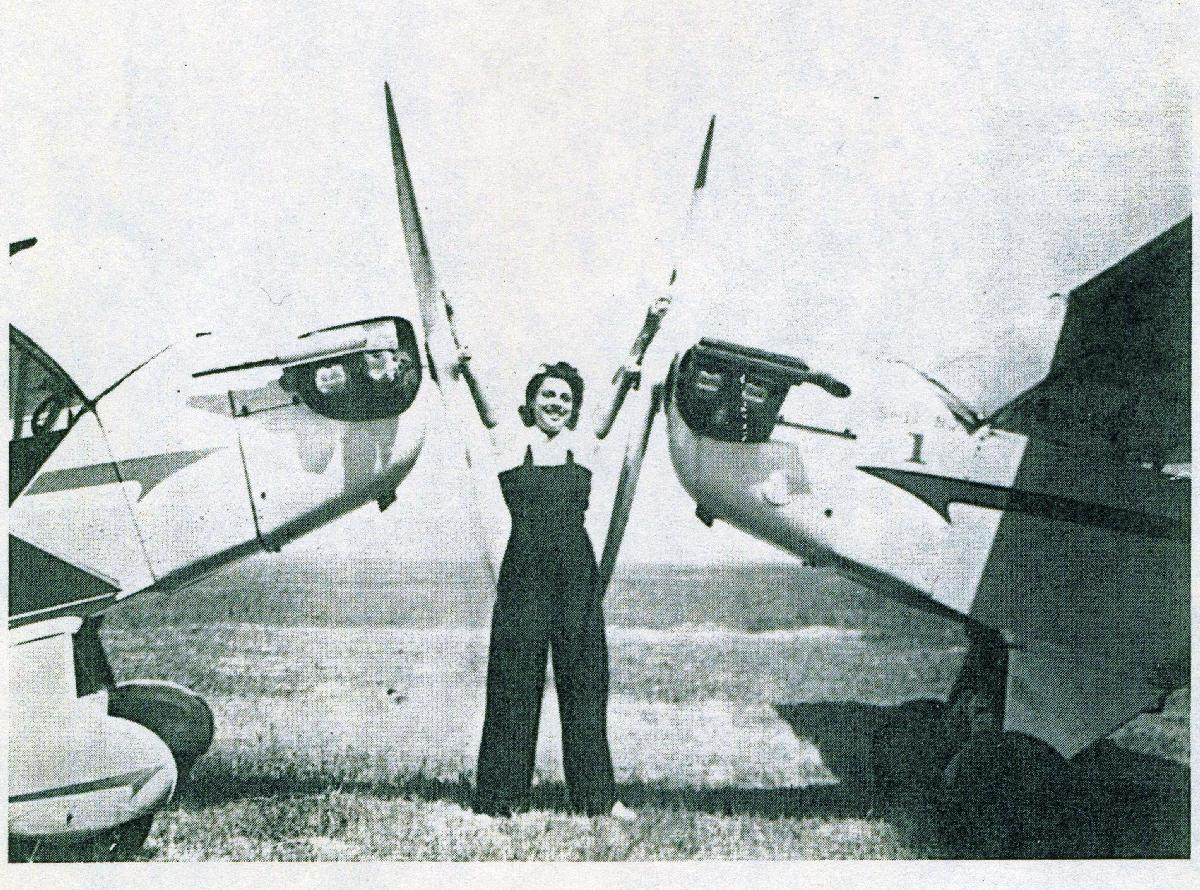
A young Willa Brown on an airfield

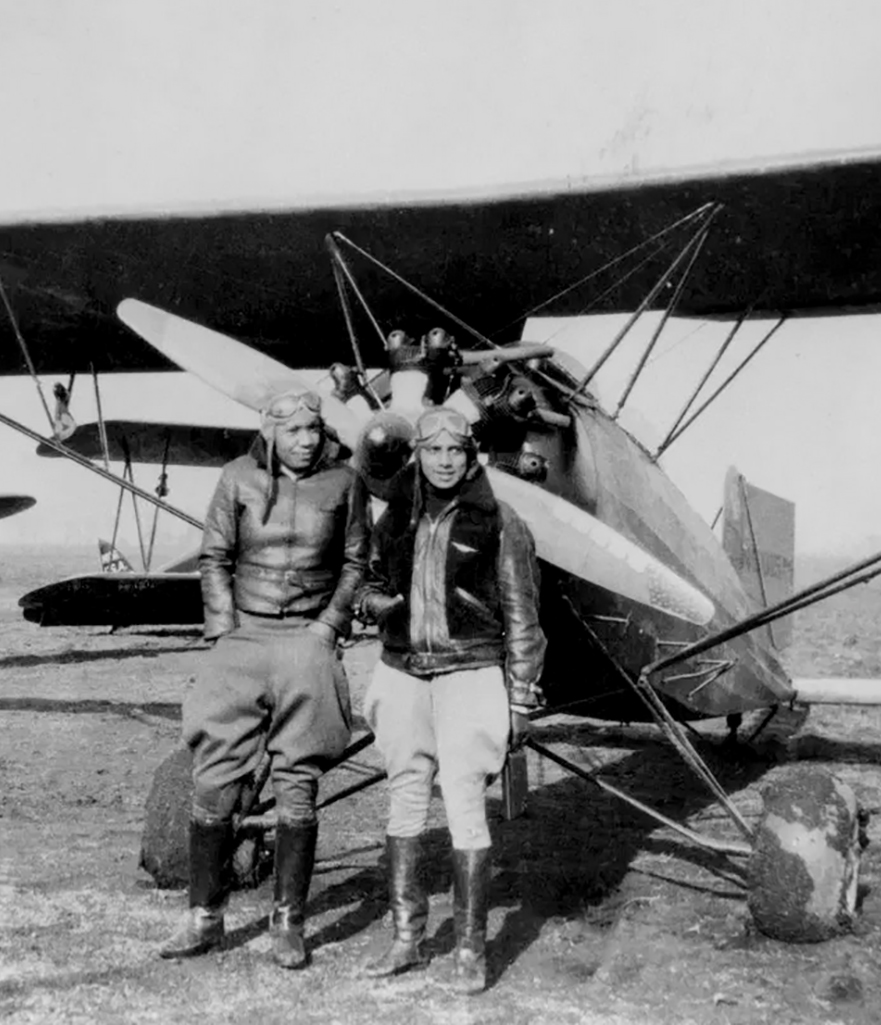
Lola Albright (left) and Willa Brown (right) at Harlem Airport, Chicago Illinois, USA

In 1934, Brown began studying flying at Chicago's racially segregated Harlem Field. She started with lessons from Fred Schumacher, Dorothy Darby, and Colonel Robinson, and ran Brown's Lunch Room, a sandwich shop, at the airfield. She eventually trained with certified flight instructor Cornelius Coffey, an expert in the field of aviation mechanics. She was one of few women who attended Curtiss–Wright Aeronautical University where she studied aircraft maintenance and earned an aircraft mechanic's license in 1935. In that year, she helped organize a memorial flight to honor Bessie Coleman, the first internationally licensed pilot from the U.S.

Brown earned a private pilot's license in 1938 and a commercial pilot's license in 1939, becoming the first African American woman to earn either type of license in the United States. (Note: Bessie Coleman was the first black American, male or female, to earn an international pilot's license which she obtained in France in the 1920s, whereas Brown was the first black American woman to earn a pilot's license in the U.S.) With her licenses, she worked as a pilot providing ten-minute pleasure rides for a $1 admission fee. She also joined the Challenger Air Pilots Association, the group who had initially introduced her to flying. Brown served as chair of the education committee.

Willa Brown, Cornelius Coffey and Enoch P. Waters worked together to form the National Negro Airmen Association of America, later renamed to National Airmen's Association of America which was incorporated in 1939. Their primary mission was to attract more interest in aviation, help develop a better understanding of the field of aeronautics, and increase African American participation in both fields. In the first year, Brown was elected to be the Association's national secretary. Brown later was elected president of the organization's Chicago branch, and user her position as an activist for racial equality. She also took on public relations duties for the organization, and flew to colleges and spoke on the radio to get African Americans interested in flying. One of her key advocacy efforts came via her performances in air shows, which were frequently covered by the Chicago Defender, which was also interested in desegregating aviation.

Brown began teaching aviation and flight for a number of organizations. In 1939, she taught aviation for the Works Progress Administration's Adult Education Program. In 1940, she earned a ground school instructor's rating from the Civil Aeronautics Authority, the precursor to the U.S. Federal Aviation Administration. That year, she and Coffey started the Coffey School of Aeronautics. They established the school for the purpose of training black pilots and teaching aviation mechanics. Brown was the school's director for its first two years, and she also taught there, while handling administrative and advertising work. During these years she also taught aviation mechanics for the Chicago Board of Education.

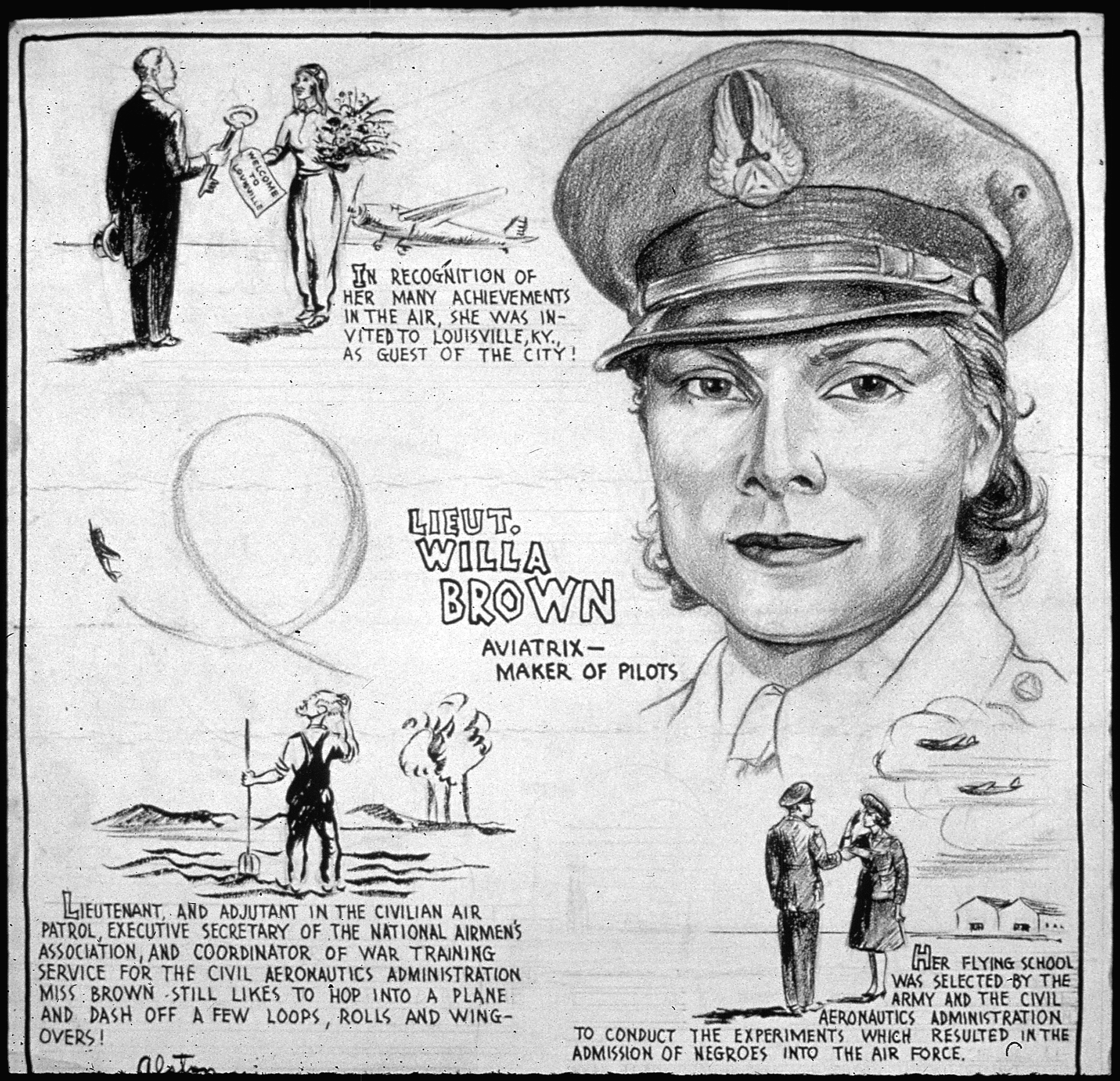
Office for Emergency Management publication featuring Brown

Brown lobbied the government as an advocate for the integration of black pilots into a then-segregated Army Air Corps and federal Civilian Pilot Training Program (CPTP). She also worked to disprove a 1925 Army War College study which had deemed African Americans unfit to fly. She lobbied the federal government to award CPTP contracts to train African American pilots, and in 1940 she was appointed coordinator of two Chicago units of the CPTP. The Coffey School was selected by the U.S. Army Air Corps as a feeder school to provide black students to its pilot training program. It was one of the few non-college contracts awarded for training black students, and Brown was additionally awarded a contract to train students at Wendell Phillips High School. Nearly 200 students from the Coffey School went on to join the Tuskegee Airmen. In 1942, she attained the rank of Lieutenant in Civil Air Patrol Squadron 613-6, becoming the first African American officer in the Civil Air Patrol. In this role, she administered command for over 1,000 members at a time. She was later appointed war-training service coordinator for the Civil Aeronautics Authority.

== Postwar career ==
The Coffey School closed in 1945 after World War II ended. Brown remained active in aviation advocacy and flight education: she was a long-term active member of the National Airmen's Association, the Illinois wing of the Civil Air Patrol, Aircraft Owners and Pilot's Association, Women Flyers of America, the National Aviation Training Association, the International Women's Air and Space Museum, the OX-5 Pioneer Aviation Club, and the Tuskegee Airman's Association.

In 1946, Brown ran in the Republican Party primary elections for Illinois's 1st congressional district, becoming the first African American woman to run in a congressional primary election. Her campaign focused on improving the opportunities for African Americans, including creating an airport owned and used by African Americans. She was defeated by William E. King. She ran unsuccessfully to be a Chicago alderman in 1947, and again for the same congressional seat in 1948. She ran for Congress a third time in the 1950 Republican primary election, and was defeated by Archibald Carey Jr.

Brown returned to teaching in high schools from 1962 until her retirement in 1971. She taught business and aeronautics. She served on the Women's Advisory Committee of the Federal Aviation Administration from 1972 to 1975. She was the first black woman to serve on that committee.

== Personal life ==
Brown was married three times. Her first marriage was to Wilbur J. Hardaway, an African American firefighter. They met while Brown was teaching in Gary, Indiana, married in 1929, and divorced in 1931.

Brown was described as follows:

When Willa Brown, a shapely young brownskin woman, wearing white jodhpurs, a form fitting white jacket and white boots, strode into our newsroom, in 1936, she made such a stunning appearance that all the typewriters suddenly went silent...Unlike most visitors, [she] wasn't at all bewildered. She had a confident bearing and there was an undercurrent of determination in her husky voice as she announced, not asked, that she wanted to see me.

— Enoch P. Waters

In 1947, she and Cornelius Coffey married, but the marriage did not last long. Her final marriage was to Reverend J. H. Chappell, pastor of the Chicago West Side Community Church, in 1955. She was a widow by 1991.

On July 18, 1992, Brown died of a stroke in Chicago, at the University of Chicago's Bernard Mitchell Hospital.

== Awards and recognition ==
- In 1939, Brown was cited in the 76th Congressional Record for achievements in aviation.
- Time magazine profiled Brown in its September 25, 1939, issue.
- Brown and Coffey had begun an annual flyover tradition to drop flowers over Bessie Coleman's grave. After Brown's death, pilots performed flower drops for her grave as well. The Tuskegee Airmen's Chicago chapter built this into a tradition for “Aviation’s Pioneer Colorful Women," later adding Janet Harmon Bragg.
- In 2002, Women in Aviation International named Brown one of the 100 most influential women in aviation and space.
- In 2003, a decade after her death, Willa Beatrice Brown was inducted into the Kentucky Aviation Hall of Fame.
- In 2010, Brown was awarded the Distinguished Alumni Award by the Indiana State University Alumni Association.
- Historical marker #238, located at the intersection of Race and Washington Streets in Glasgow, Kentucky. The marker was erected in recognition of Willa Brown Chappell, "the first African American woman to earn a pilot's license in the United States".
- Achievement #10 in the Civil Air Patrol cadet program, earning a cadet the rank of Cadet/1st Lieutenant, is named after Lt. Willa Brown.
- Willa was a member of Alpha Kappa Alpha sorority.
- In 2022 Brown was enshrined in the National Aviation Hall of Fame.
