= Coffey School of Aeronautics =

Former aviation school in Oak Lawn, Illinois

Location
- Harlem Airport; Oak Lawn, Illinois; United States; 41°43′49″N 87°47′54″W

Information
- Type: Flight school
- Established: 1938
- Founder: Cornelius Coffey; Willa Brown
- Closed: 1945

The Coffey School of Aeronautics was a flight school at Harlem Airport in Oak Lawn, Illinois, founded by Cornelius Coffey and Willa Brown. Established in 1938, it was the first flight school owned and operated by African Americans in the United States. The school was one of only two non-collegiate institutions selected to participate in the federal Civilian Pilot Training Program (CPTP) for African American students, training over 200 pilots who went on to join the Tuskegee Airmen. The school closed in 1945 following the end of World War II.

== Background ==
Cornelius Coffey and fellow aviator John C. Robinson had faced significant barriers to aviation training in the 1920s due to racial segregation. After being initially denied admission to the Curtiss-Wright Aeronautical School in Chicago on racial grounds, they filed a lawsuit and were eventually admitted, with Coffey graduating first in his class in 1931 as the first African American certified aircraft mechanic. In 1931, Coffey and Robinson established Robbins Airport in the predominantly African American town of Robbins, Illinois, the first Black-owned airport in the United States. When a violent storm destroyed the airport's hangar in May 1933, the aviators relocated to Harlem Airport at the invitation of its white owners, brothers Fred and William Schumacher.

== History ==
Coffey established the Coffey School of Aeronautics at Harlem Airport in 1938, located at the intersection of 87th Street and Harlem Avenue. The school operated at the south end of the airport under an arrangement with the Schumachers, who ran their own flight school for white students at the north end. Coffey served as the primary flight instructor and personally maintained the school's aircraft, while Willa Brown, whom he married in 1939, served as director and handled administrative operations. Brown also ran a ground school at Chicago's Wendell Phillips High School and taught aviation mechanics for the Chicago Board of Education.

The school's fleet initially consisted of 50-horsepower Piper Cubs for primary training and 220-horsepower WACO PT-14s borrowed from Curtiss-Wright for secondary training. By June 1941, the fleet had grown to ten aircraft. Unlike many institutions of the era, the school imposed no restrictions on gender or race, and Coffey taught both Black and white students together.

== Civilian Pilot Training Program ==
In 1939, Coffey and Brown, along with journalist Enoch P. Waters, co-founded the National Airmen's Association of America (NAAA) to advocate for the inclusion of African Americans in federal aviation programs and the United States Army Air Corps. The NAAA's lobbying efforts, combined with a publicity flight to Washington, D.C. by pilots Dale White and Chauncey Spencer to meet with Senator Harry S. Truman, helped secure the participation of African Americans in the Civilian Pilot Training Program.

When the CPTP was expanded to include African American training sites in 1940, the Coffey School of Aeronautics was selected as one of only two non-collegiate institutions certified to train Black students, alongside six historically Black colleges and universities. Brown was appointed federal coordinator for the CPTP in Chicago. The school's curriculum included primary flight instruction, secondary training, cross-country navigation, and flight instructor certification—making it one of only two Black programs, along with Tuskegee Institute, to offer all four levels of instruction. Each trainee received 35 hours of flight time.

== Legacy ==
From 1938 to 1945, the school trained over 1,000 students in aviation. Approximately 200 of its graduates went on to serve with the Tuskegee Airmen during World War II, earning Brown the nickname "Maker of Pilots". Notable alumni included pilots who later served in the 99th Pursuit Squadron.

The school closed in 1945 following the end of World War II, when federal funding through the CPTP and its successor, the War Training Service, was discontinued. Harlem Airport itself closed in 1956 after its owners lost their lease; the site is now occupied by Southfield Shopping Center in Bridgeview, Illinois.

After the school's closure, Coffey continued teaching aviation at the Lewis School of Aeronautics in Lockport and at Dunbar Vocational High School in Chicago, where he trained some of the first African Americans hired as mechanics by commercial airlines. In 1980, the Federal Aviation Administration honored Coffey by naming an aerial navigation waypoint the "Cofey Fix" (limited to five letters) near Chicago Midway Airport. Coffey was posthumously inducted into the National Aviation Hall of Fame in 2023.

== See also ==
- Robbins Airport (Illinois)
- Tuskegee Airmen
- Civilian Pilot Training Program
