= NAAA =

NAAA may refer to:

== Science and technology ==
- N-acylethanolamine acid amidase an enzyme encoded by the gene NAAA in humans
- 5-nitroanthranilic acid aminohydrolase an enzyme found in certain bacteria

== Sports ==
- National Association of Amateur Athletes of America
- Nepal Athletics Association formerly called Nepal Amateur Athletics Association (NAAA)
- Nevis Amateur Athletic Association
- Naval Academy Athletic Association (see Navy Midshipmen for related topics)

== Other ==
- National Association of Arab-Americans
- National Academy of Audit and Accounts, a training facility for the Indian Audit and Accounts Service
- National Airmen's Association of America (see Coffey School of Aeronautics#Civilian Pilot Training Program)
- Non-ASEAN Member States Ambassadors to ASEAN, a legal term used in the ASEAN charter
- naʼá̱á̱ an Apache word meaning older brother
