= Robbins Airport (Illinois) =

- IATA: none; ICAO: none

Summary
- Airport type: Closed
- Location: Robbins, Illinois
- In use: 1931–1933

Robbins Airport, located in Robbins, Illinois, was the first airport to be owned and operated by African-Americans.

Robbins Airport was built after the closure of the Acres Airport, the only Chicago-area airport that serviced black pilots. It was constructed by the Challenger Air Pilots' Association, a group of 15 to 20 black aviators that included pilots Cornelius Coffey, John C. Robinson, Janet Bragg, Earl W. Renfroe, and Harold Hurd, on the site of an abandoned airfield. The site consisted of one hangar and a half-mile-wide dirt airstrip. Construction was completed in January 1933. It was approved as an airfield by the United States Department of Commerce and was the only accredited black-owned Airport in the country. The airport was managed by Robinson, who began teaching other members of the Challenger club to fly in the spring of 1933. Robbins Airport had the only flight school at the time where African-Americans could be trained as pilots. The surrounding white communities, such as Blue Island and Midlothian, did not approve of this activity, and their police sometimes arrested black pilots if they were forced to land before reaching the airport. However the pilots had the support of Robbins mayor and police chief, who would get them released. In May 1933, the hangar was destroyed by a storm. The pilots relocated to Harlem Airport in Chicago (southeast corner of West 87th Street and South Harlem Avenue in Oak Lawn now Southfields Shopping Center) at the invitation of the airport's white owners. At Harlem Airport, Coffey opened the Coffey School of Aeronautics, which trained both black and white pilots. Many of the flight school instructors entered the Tuskegee Airmen Program during World War II. The Harlem Airport closed after 1956.
