= Curtiss–Wright Aeronautical University =

- Curtis–Wright Aeronautical University Building
- U.S. National Register of Historic Places
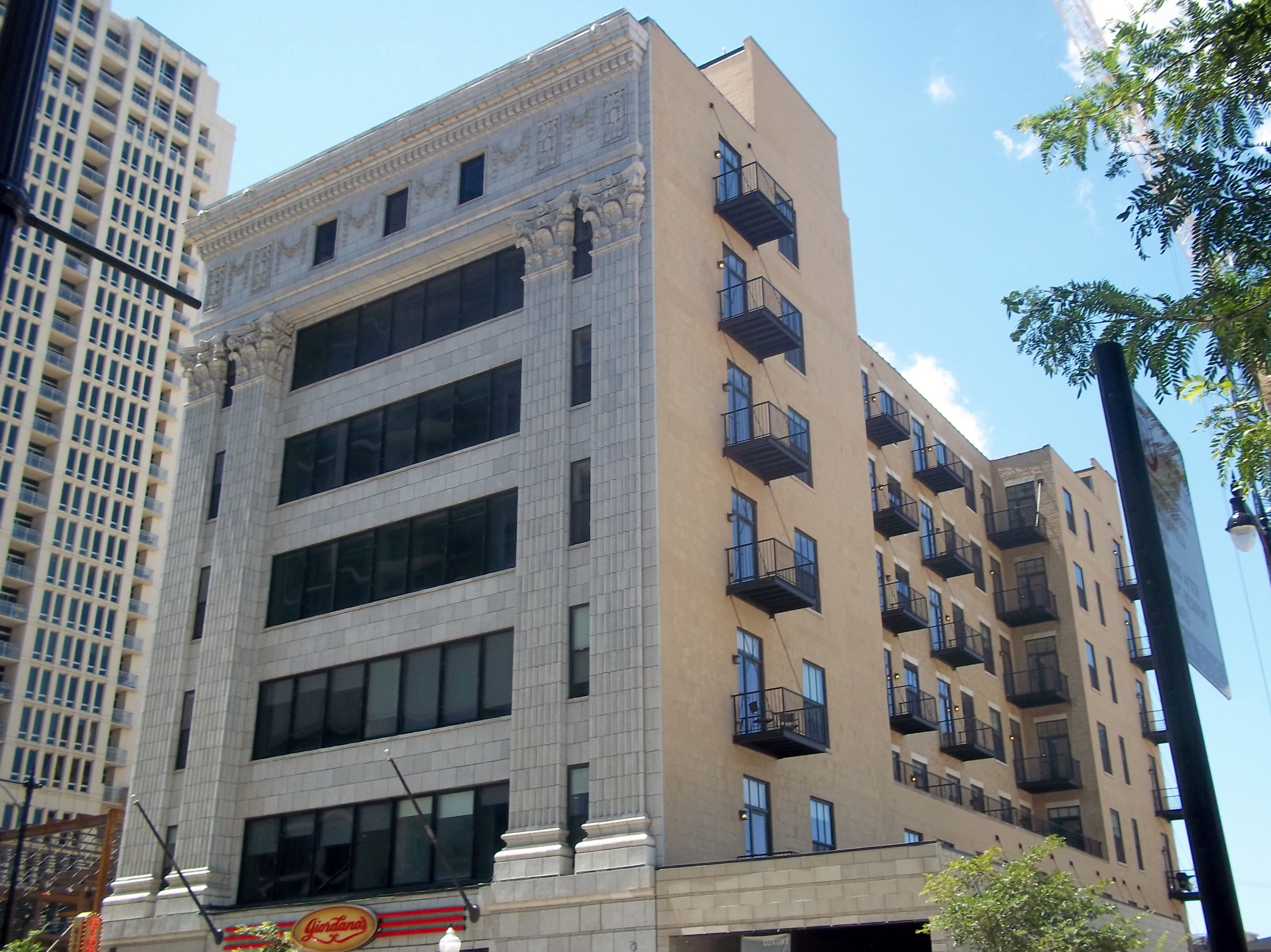

- Location within Illinois Location within the United States
- Location: 1338-1342 S. Michigan Avenue, Chicago, Illinois
- Coordinates: 41°51′53″N 87°37′28″W
- Area: less than one acre
- Built: 1922
- Architect: Henry J. Schlacks
- Architectural style: Classical Revival
- NRHP reference No.: 13000827
- Added to NRHP: October 16, 2013

Curtiss–Wright Aeronautical University was a flight school in Chicago, Illinois founded by aircraft manufacturer Curtiss-Wright. Open from 1929 until 1953, the university was the first accredited flight school in the Midwest which accepted black students and instructors. While it opened as an all-white school, after Cornelius Coffey and John C. Robinson threatened to sue the school for denying them entrance in 1930, the superintendent agreed to conduct segregated classes for black students if the two could prove that enough black students would enroll. The two founded the Challenger Air Pilots Association to develop the city's black aviation community, and by 1932 they had organized enough people to begin an all-black class. When the school lost access to its original airfield in 1933, its black students opened their own field due to the discrimination they faced at the city's other fields; originally located in the black community of Robbins, it later moved to 87th Street and Harlem Avenue in Chicago. The school's students played an important role in both developing Chicago's black aviation community and fighting for equality and the growth of black aviation nationwide. Aside from Coffey and Robinson, its notable alumni included Willa Brown, Janet Bragg, and several of the Tuskegee Airmen.

The school operated out of a seven-story building located at 1338-1342 S. Michigan Avenue. The building was listed on the National Register of Historic Places on October 16, 2013, due to its association with the school.
