= Samuel E. Nichols =

American politician

4th Mayor of Robbins, Illinois
- In office 1929–1930
- Preceded by: Richard Flowers
- Succeeded by: Thomas J. Kellar

Personal details
- Born: March 28, 1894 Robbins, Illinois
- Died: October 18, 1963 (aged 69) Los Angeles, California
- Spouse: Lishia Mae Parks
- Children: 4

Samuel Earl Nichols (March 28, 1894 – October 18, 1963) was an American politician and civic leader who served as mayor of Robbins, Illinois, from 1929 to 1930. Nichols was the fourth mayor of Robbins, Illinois, the first municipality in the northern United States entirely governed by African Americans. He was the father of actress Nichelle Nichols, best known for portraying Lieutenant Uhura on the original Star Trek series.

== Early life and education ==
Samuel Earl Nichols was born on March 28, 1894, in St. Louis, Missouri, the son of Lydia Annie Myers (née Haverson), a Black woman; and Samuel Gillespie Nichols, a white man from Louisiana and one of the original settlers to Robbins. The family settled in the Robbins area in the late 19th or early 20th century where they built a two-story frame house in which Nichelle Nichols was later born. Nichols worked as a factory worker at the Hydrox Chemical Company; and also served as chief magistrate of Robbins.

== Political career ==
Nichols was elected mayor of Robbins in 1929, succeeding Richard Flowers. He served a single term. He was succeeded by founding mayor Thomas J. Kellar for a third term (1931–1932). During Nichols' tenure, after Robbins' police discovered and destroyed an illegal gin mill linked to Al Capone's organization, Capone's brother Frank Capone was sent to confront the mayor at his home, accusing him of taking bribes and threatening his life. Nichols denied receiving any bribes, stating he had helped found the town and would rather die than allow it to be corrupted. His then pregnant wife, Lishia Mae Nichols subsequently pulled out a gun she had hidden under a pillow. Frank Capone left without further action noting her courage.

== Personal life ==
In 1914, Nichols married Catherine Romena Minnie Cardoza; they divorced in 1924. In 1929, he married Lishia Mae Parks; they had 4 children, Samuel Earl Nichols Jr. (1928–2022), an artist and longtime U.S. Postal Service employee; and Nichelle Nichols (born Grace Dell Nichols, 1932–2022), actress and NASA recruiter; Frank Allen Nichols; and Thomas Alva Nichols. His grandson, son of Nichelle, is actor Kyle Johnson.

Nichols died of prostate cancer on October 18, 1963, in Los Angeles, California, at age 69. He is buried at Evergreen Cemetery in Los Angeles.

== Legacy ==
Nichols is remembered as an early African American municipal leader in one of the nation's pioneering all-Black governed northern communities and for his stand against organized crime during Prohibition.
