= Beryl Bain =

Canadian actress and playwright

- Occupations: Actress, playwright

Beryl Bain is a Canadian actress and playwright.

== Early life and education ==
Bain studied acting at York University, graduating in 2005 with a BFA.

== Career ==
Bain has participated in several seasons of both the Shaw Festival and the Stratford Festival. In 2023, Bain will debut the work The Flight which explores the life of aviation pioneer Bessie Coleman, the first African American and first Native American to hold an international pilot's license. In addition to appearing in several Canadian-produced television series, Bain has also done voicework for Far Cry 5.

== Acting credits ==
=== Theatre ===
Year	Title	Role	Theatre	Notes
2008	After The Dance		Shaw Festival	
2008	The Stepmother		Shaw Festival	
2009	Born Yesterday		Shaw Festival	
2010	The Women	Peggy	Shaw Festival	
2011	I Markus Garvey	Amy Jacques/Amy Jacques Garvey/Chorus	Theatre Archipelago	
2011	Awake	Actor		
2013	Awake	Nadia		
2013	Dirty Butterfly	Amelia		
2014	Complex	Althea		
2015	The Living	Performer		
2018	The Comedy of Errors	Dromio	Stratford Festival	
2018	Brontë: The World Without	Charlotte Brontë	Stratford Festival	
2019	Mother's Daughter	Bassett		
2023	The Flight	Bessie Coleman	Theatre Gargantua, Factory Theatre	

=== Television ===
Year	Title	Role	Notes
2012	The Firm	Tracy Van Horn	
2012	Warehouse 13 (season 4)	Lisa Bernardo	Season 4, Episode 6
2015	Rogue	Hotel Maid	Season 3, Episode 5
