= Mississippi Aviation Heritage Museum =

- Location within Mississippi
- Established: 2002
- Location: Gulfport, Mississippi
- Coordinates: 30.3897°N 89.0582°W
- Type: Aviation museum
- Website: www.msaviationmuseum.org

The Mississippi Aviation Heritage Museum is an aviation museum in Gulfport, Mississippi.

== History ==
=== Background ===
In 1973, Thomas E. Simmons, a businessman and pilot, read a newspaper article about Gulfport native and early African-American aviator John C. Robinson. After years of research that led to creation of a book about Robinson, the John C. Robinson Brown Condor Association was established in 2001. The following year, it received $250,000 from the state legislature to create a museum and began collaborating with the University of Southern Mississippi to conduct oral history interviews with individuals who knew Robinson or the environment he grew up in. The association commissioned a bust of Robinson, which went on display at the Gulfport-Biloxi International Airport in 2010. The dedication also served as the beginning of efforts to build the museum. Plans originally called for the construction of a two-floor 52,000 sq ft (4,800 m^{2}) building near the airport. Focus eventually shifted to a World War II-era hangar at the airport, but this also did not come to fruition.

=== Move to off-airport location ===
The museum leased a vacant 33,000 sq ft (3,100 m^{2}) furniture store from the city in September 2016 and began renovating it. After four years of work, the museum opened on 3 October 2020.

== Exhibits ==
Exhibits at the museum include the Mississippi Aviation Hall of Fame, as well as galleries about the Tuskegee Airmen, Hurricane Hunters, crop dusting, military bases in Mississippi and the Vietnam War.

A scale replica of a C-130 that was used in parades, nicknamed "Lil' Bill", was donated in 2021 by the Hurricane Hunters.

== Collection ==
- Austein Woodpecker
- Cessna 175 Skylark
- Cessna 310
- Cessna 336 Skymaster
- RotorWay helicopter
- Rutan Quickie
- Van's RV-3A
