= Thomas J. Kellar =

American politician

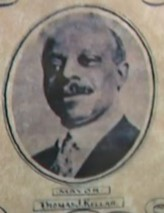
- Thomas J Kellar, mayor of Robbins, 1918

1st Mayor of Robbins, Illinois
- In office 1931–1932
- Preceded by: Samuel E. Nichols
- Succeeded by: J.S. Richardson
- In office 1925–1926
- Preceded by: Richard Flowers
- Succeeded by: Richard Flowers
- In office 1918–1920
- Preceded by: None
- Succeeded by: R. H. Bryant

Personal details
- Born: Kentucky
- Spouse: Leona Kellar
- Children: 1

Thomas J. Kellar was an American politician who was the founding mayor of Robbins, Illinois, the first municipality in the north that was entirely governed by African-Americans.

== Biography ==
Kellar was born in Kentucky and moved to Chicago in 1880 where he worked for the Cook County Board of Assessors. On September 15, 1917, he was engaged by Richard Flowers, president of an organization made up of Black residents who lived southwest of Blue Island, Illinois to coordinate the effort to incorporate a separate municipality which would be the first all-Black town in Cook County, Illinois. Kellar argued before the Cook County Board: "The real way to help colored people is to make it possible for them to help themselves. Give them transportation and housing and they will segregate themselves naturally." Despite resistance and doubt to the idea of a Black-majority, Black-run city, the Cook County Board relented and after a local vote, the village was incorporated on December 11, 1917 with a population of 400 inhabitants. The first election was held on January 15, 1918, with Kellar elected as the mayor and six trustees empaneled (Richard Flowers, Leroy P. Thomas, R. H. Bryant, Jerry Taylor, Edward Brown, George Winburn). He was re-elected in the April 1919 election to a full two-year term. By Dec 1919, the population had increased to 1,000. He was defeated by R. H. Bryant in the April 1921 election. He was re-elected as mayor in 1925 (defeating Richard Flowers) and again in 1931.

== Personal life ==
Kellar was married to Leona Kellar; they had a daughter, Jewell Simington.

== See also ==
- List of first African-American mayors
