= Harlem Airport =

Airport in Montana, United States

- IATA: none; ICAO: none; FAA LID: 48S

Summary
- Airport type: Public
- Owner: Blaine County & City of Harlem
- Serves: Harlem, Montana
- Elevation AMSL: 2,643 ft (806 m)
- Coordinates: 48°33′58″N 108°46′24″W

Map
- Location of airport in Montana

Runways
Direction	Length		Surface
Direction	ft	m	Surface
11/29	4,100	1,250	Asphalt
15/33	1,942	592	Turf

Statistics (2012)
- Aircraft operations: 3,850
- Based aircraft: 5
- Source: Federal Aviation Administration

Harlem Airport (FAA LID: 48S) is a public use airport located three nautical miles (6 km) north of the central business district of Harlem, a city in Blaine County, Montana, United States. It is owned by the Blaine County and the City of Harlem. This airport is included in the National Plan of Integrated Airport Systems for 2011–2015, which categorized it as a general aviation facility.

== Facilities and aircraft ==
Harlem Airport covers an area of 237 acres (96 ha) at an elevation of 2,643 feet (806 m) above mean sea level. It has two runways: 11/29 is 4,100 by 75 feet (1,250 x 23 m) with an asphalt surface and 15/33 is 1,942 by 120 feet (592 x 37 m) with a turf surface.

For the 12-month period ending July 20, 2012, the airport had 3,850 general aviation aircraft operations, an average of 10 per day. At that time there were five single-engine aircraft based at this airport.

== See also ==
- List of airports in Montana
