= 5-nitroanthranilic acid aminohydrolase =

Class of enzymes

Identifiers
- EC no.: 3.5.99.8

Databases
- BRENDA: enzyme data
- ExPASy: NiceZyme view
- KEGG: enzyme entry
- MetaCyc: metabolic pathway
- Rhea: reactions
- PDB structures: RCSB PDB PDBe PDBsum
Search
- PMC: articles
- PubMed: articles
- NCBI: proteins

5-nitroanthranilic acid aminohydrolase (EC 3.5.99.8, naaA (gene), 5NAA deaminase) is an enzyme with systematic name 5-nitroanthranilate amidohydrolase. It catalyses the hydrolysis of 5-nitroanthranilic acid to 5-nitrosalicylic acid and ammonia:

5-nitroanthranilic acid
H_{2}O
NH_{3}
5-nitrosalicylic acid

The enzyme is present in Bradyrhizobium species, strain JS329. It requires manganese or zinc as Mn^{2+} or Zn^{2+}.
