= Janet Bragg =

American amateur aviator, nurse and businesswoman (1907–1993)

- Born: March 24, 1907; Griffin, Georgia, U.S.
- Died: April 11, 1993 (aged 86); Blue Island, Illinois, U.S.
- Other name: Janet Harmon
- Occupation: Aviator

Janet Harmon Waterford Bragg (born Jane Nettie Harmon) (March 24, 1907 — April 11, 1993) was an American amateur aviator. In 1942, she was the first African-American woman to hold an unlimited commercial pilot license. She is a 2022 inductee to the Georgia Aviation Hall of Fame.

== Life ==
Janet Harmon was born on March 24, 1907, in Griffin, Georgia. She was the seventh child in a family with African and Cherokee ancestry. Harmon attended Episcopal schools and Spelman College in Atlanta, Georgia, and qualified as a registered nurse in 1929. Shortly after graduation she left Georgia for Illinois and was hired as a nurse by Wilson Hospital in Chicago. She married Evans Waterford; this first marriage fell apart in two years. After the divorce Harmon continued to work as nurse, this time for practicing doctors, and attended the Loyola University. In 1941–51 she worked as a health inspector for an insurance company. In 1953 she married Sumner Bragg; together the Braggs managed and founded two nursing homes for the elderly in Chicago until their own retirement in 1972. Sumner died in 1986 and Janet survived him until 1993. Her autobiography, Soaring Above Setbacks, was published posthumously in 1996.

== Aviation ==
In 1928, Bragg became the first black woman to enroll in the Curtiss Wright School of Aeronautics in Chicago. In 1933 Janet (then Waterford) enrolled at Curtiss Wright Aeronautical University, a segregated black aviation school managed by John C. Robinson and Cornelius Coffey. She was the only woman in a class with 24 black men. In 1934 she provided $600 of her own money to buy the school's first airplane, and helped in building the school's own airfield in Robbins, Illinois. In the summer she learned flying and obtained her private pilot's license. In 1943 she applied to join the Women Airforce Service Pilots (WASP) program. When she went in for an interview, Ethel Sheehy, assistant to the head of WASP, denied her an interview because she was black. A few weeks later, she received a rejection letter from Jacqueline Cochran, head of WASP, for the same reason. Her application to the military nurse corps was rejected, also on racial grounds. She then enrolled in the Civilian Pilot Training Program at Tuskegee Institute in Tuskegee, Alabama. Despite completing her coursework, examination, and flight test, she was denied a pilot's license in Alabama, for being a "colored girl", but managed to receive a license at Pal-Waukee Field, Illinois.

Bragg was involved in the inception of the National Association of American Airmen, designed to represent the nascent profession to the government.

Bragg retired from flying in 1965 with about 2000 hours of flight time.
