= John Robinson (aviator) =

American aviator and activist (1903–1954)

John C. Robinson
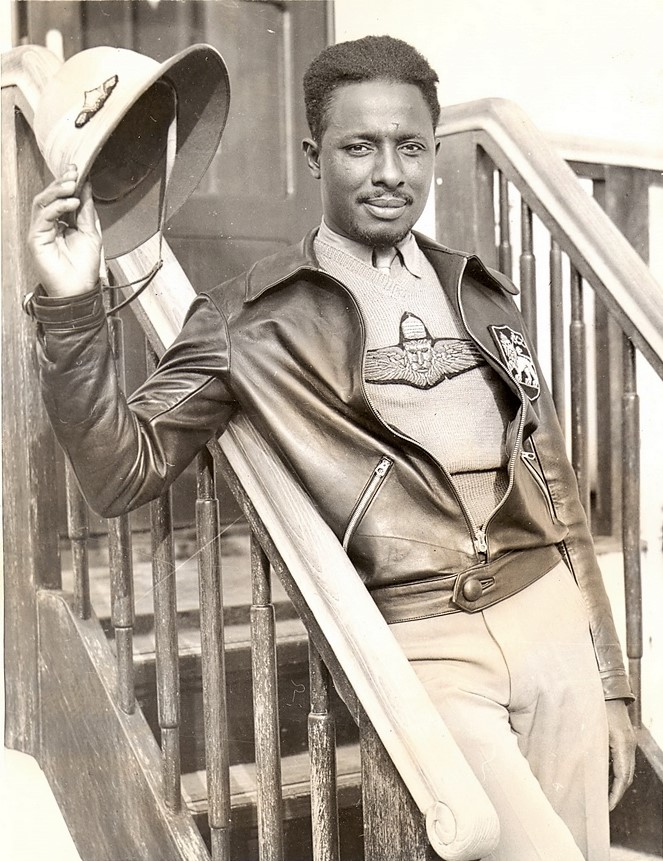
- Robinson in Ethiopian Air Force Uniform
- Born: November 26, 1903; Carrabelle, Florida, U.S.
- Died: March 27, 1954 (aged 50); Addis Ababa, Ethiopian Empire
- Burial place: Gulele Cemetery; Addis Ababa, Ethiopia
- Military career
- Allegiance: Ethiopia
- Branch: Imperial Ethiopian Air Force
- Service years: 1935–1936
- Rank: Colonel
- Nickname: The Brown Condor
- Unit: Brown Condor Squadron
- Conflicts: Second Italo-Ethiopian War
- Other work: Ethiopian Air Lines

John Charles Robinson (November 26, 1903 – March 27, 1954) was an American aviator and activist who was hailed as the "Brown Condor" for his service in the Imperial Ethiopian Air Force against Fascist Italy. Robinson pushed for equal opportunities for African-Americans during his early career and was able to open his own eponymous aviation school in addition to initiating a program for black pilots at his college, the Tuskegee Institute. Robinson's achievements as an aviator were in stark contrast to the limited opportunities for most African-Americans in aviation careers and were an important factor in reducing racially based prohibitions in the United States. Robinson is sometimes referred to as the "Father of the Tuskegee Airmen" for inspiring this all-black group of pilots who served in the United States Army Air Forces following the United States' entry into World War II.

== Early life ==
Robinson was born in 1903, in Carrabelle, Florida, and spent his early years in Gulfport, Mississippi. His birth father died when he was a baby, leaving him and his four-year-old sister, Bertha, with their mother Celeste Robinson, who then married Charles Cobb. Robinson was inspired by flight at an early age. According to one account, in 1910, Robinson was seven years old when he witnessed a float-equipped biplane flown by John Moisant in Gulfport, Mississippi.

== Education ==
Robinson completed his education at Gulfport High School for the Colored in 1919, where he developed a strong interest in mechanics and machinery. However, Robinson could not continue his education in Gulfport; African-Americans were barred from continuing their education beyond the tenth grade. Robinson subsequently made preparations to attend the Tuskegee Institute in Alabama. He first attended college at the Tuskegee Institute in September 1921 to study automotive mechanical science, graduating three years later. In addition to studying automobiles, he learned math, literature, composition and history. Inspired by the example of aviation pioneer Bessie Coleman, Robinson with his friend Cornelius Coffey went to Chicago to pursue aviation careers. Robinson helped integrate African American pilots into the American aviation industry. He repeatedly applied to the Curtiss-Wright School of Aviation in Chicago, but was denied each time. He ended up getting a job there as a janitor and unofficially sat in on classes until an instructor managed to secure a place for him, and was the first black student at the school.

== Early employment ==
Prior to entering college, Robinson held a short-term job as shoeshine man before getting a job as warehouse personnel. After finishing his college degree, Robinson was unable to find a suitable career in his hometown of Gulfport. Robinson attributed this to racial discrimination as many of the local garages were under white ownership; speaking to his father, he said, "[The garage owners will] give me a job sweeping, filling gas tanks, changing tires, or washing, but I'm an engine man ... When I talk to [them] about automotive science they smile, look at each other, and then look at me like I belong behind a mule and a plow."

Robinson consequently moved to the Detroit area, where jobs in the automotive industry might be more plentiful. There, he had difficulty finding a line of work that his college degree would have ensured him. Robinson continued to refuse jobs sweeping or as a messenger boy, and managed to become a mechanic's assistant instead. Despite continued discrimination and failure to acknowledge his experience from some of his white coworkers, Robinson's skill was noticed and he was promoted to a full mechanic and was given a pay raise. Sometime later, he was approached by taxi cab owner named Fitzgerald who offered to double his pay to work for his garage. Robinson took the job, but was never comfortable working for a business that secretly bootlegged whiskey to Canada during the Prohibition Age.

== Aviation ==
Despite his successes as a mechanic, Robinson began searching for means to take to the air. He was eventually directed to a small field, where he met pilots Robert Williamson and Percy, and earned his first flight in Robert's Waco 9 after fixing the engine on Percy's Curtiss JN-4D (Jenny). Robinson was determined as ever to get back into the air, and sought his next best chance to do so in Chicago. After opening a garage for income, he repeatedly applied for the Curtiss-Wright School of Aviation. Robinson was rejected every time, but circumnavigated this roadblock altogether by becoming a janitor on Saturday nights, thereby being able to listen in on the lessons being taught in the evening class at the time. Becoming exposed to like-minded individuals in the subject, Robinson started the Aero Study Group, one that successfully managed to build its own airplane, tested out by the same night teacher whose class Robinson cleaned, Bill Henderson. Impressed by the plane, Henderson got Robinson a slot at the school, and, under the instructions of Mr. Snyder, Robinson became a licensed pilot. Before long, Robinson convinced the school to allow his peers from the Aero Study Group to enroll and become pilots as well.

Later, Robinson, along with his friend Cornelius Coffey formed the Challenger Air Pilots Association for African Americans wanting to fly. Deciding that aviation school should not be closed to African-Americans, Robinson and his friend Cornelius Coffey opened their own airfield in Robbins, Illinois, the John Robinson School of Aviation. To further promote black pilots, Robinson convinced his old college, the Tuskegee Institute, to open up a school of aviation, as soon as funds were available to do so.

== Ethiopia ==
In January 1935, Robinson announced his intentions to volunteer to defend Ethiopia in its upcoming conflict with Italy. The announcement took place at a meeting of black business owners and community leaders sponsored by the Associated Negro Press (ANP) in Chicago. Dr. Melaku Bayen, a cousin of Ethiopian Emperor Haile Selassie, became aware of Robinson's announcement and qualifications, and met with Robinson directly. Bayen subsequently made a favorable recommendation for Robinson to Haile Selassie. In April 1935, Haile Selassie wired an official invitation to Robinson offering an officer's commission in Ethiopia.

After arriving in 1935, Robinson initially conducted pilot training at a recently opened officer training school close to Addis Ababa. On 8 August 1935, Robinson was assaulted by fellow aviator Hubert Julian at the Hotel de France in Addis Ababa. Julian, a recognized aviator from Trinidad who volunteered to help develop the Ethiopian Air Corps, was then ordered by the Emperor to leave the country. Soon after the incident, Robinson was then named the commander of the Ethiopian Air Force. The air force consisted of about two dozen aircraft, which included four Potez 25 biplanes, but all of the aircraft were weaponless. The eventual force totaled to 19 aircraft and 50 pilots.

When the Italian invasion began on October 3, 1935, Robinson participated in several reconnaissance missions to provide supplies and soldiers from Addis Ababa to Adwa. Robinson was also a witness to an Italian bombing of the city of Adwa in October 1935. He observed that the city was unprepared for the attack, and resulted in much confusion and residents fleeing to the city outskirts. "I saw a squad of soldiers standing in the street dumbfounded, looking at the airplanes. They had their swords raised in their hands," he described. The day after the bombing, Robinson was nearly shot down in his Potez 25 by a swarm of six Italian fighters, but narrowly managed to escape.

Robinson then would spend most of his time flying a Beechcraft Model 17 Staggerwing, a fast civilian aircraft primarily designed for air racing that could easily outpace Italian fighters. For the remainder of the war, he participated in several missions providing communications between Emperor Haile Selassie and his commanders at the front, without further incident. On 30 April 1936, Robinson fled Addis Ababa with the military attache of the American Legation, Captain John Leade.

For his service, Robinson received considerable press attention for his service through NBC Radio, the Transradio Press Service, and the Chicago Defender. Robinson returned to the United States in 1936. Contemporary historians also recognize his achievements in Ethiopia. Robinson's documented achievements in Ethiopia are considered to be the catalyst that inspired demands for social equality to allow African-Americans to serve in the U.S. Army Air Corps, and allowed for the organization of the African-American military pilot group, the Tuskegee Airmen, during World War II. Robinson is therefore sometimes referred to as the "Father of the Tuskegee Airmen".

== Later life and death ==
In 1944, after Ethiopia's liberation by the Allies, Robinson returned to the country to establish a pilot training school. He also played a role in the foundation of Ethiopian Airlines, having trained the pilots, and acting as manager and supervisor. He died in Addis Ababa on March 27, 1954, from injuries he suffered in a plane crash.

== Legacy ==
Robinson's Aero Club is the subject of the novel, The Challengers Aero Club by Severo Perez.

On February 19, 2015, a reading garden at the U.S. Embassy in Ethiopia was dedicated to commemorate Robinson's contributions to Ethiopian aviation during and after war with Italy.

A segment featuring John Robinson's story aired during an episode of Full Frontal with Samantha Bee on February 7, 2018.

In 2002, the John C. Robinson Brown Condor Association, located in Gulfport, MS, was named in his honor.
