= Cornelius Coffey =

American aviator

Cornelius Robinson Coffey (September 6, 1903, Newport, Arkansas – March 2, 1994, Chicago, Illinois) was an American aviator. Alongside Willa Brown, he was the first African American to create a non-university-affiliated aeronautical school in the United States.

== Career ==
Coffey's work in aviation was in part inspired by the example of pioneering African American aviator Bessie Coleman in the 1920s. Coffey helped integrate African American pilots into the American aviation industry. He worked with his friend John C. Robinson, together, they formed the Challenger Air Pilots Association and in the 1930s integrated the Curtiss–Wright Aeronautical University. He opened the Coffey School of Aeronautics in Robbins, Illinois with his wife, Willa Brown, where many African American pilots were trained, including some of the Tuskegee Airmen. Among his other colleagues, Coffey also worked with early pilot Janet Harmon Bragg. The school moved to the former Harlem Avenue Airport in Illinois, which was located at 87th Street and Harlem Avenue in the late 1930s. After World War II, he taught aeronautics at the Lewis Holy Name School of Aeronautics in Romeoville, Illinois and at Chicago's Dunbar Vocational High School.

== Awards and honors ==
He received the Dwight H. Green Trophy in 1941. He was honored with a day by the City of Chicago on July 22, 1980. He was inducted into the Illinois Aviation Hall of Fame in 1984. In September 2023, Coffey was inducted into the National Aviation Hall of Fame in Dayton, Ohio.

== Legacy ==
The Cornelius R. Coffey Aviation Education Foundation was established at the American Airlines Maintenance Academy in Chicago in his honor to train young pilots.

Pilots flying to Midway Airport make a course correction over Lake Calumet which is known as the Coffey Fix. Coffey's Piper Tri-Pacer 135 aircraft was scheduled to be on exhibit from 2016 at the Octave Chanute Aerospace Museum as part of the exhibit, Barnstormers, Wing-walkers, and Entrepreneurs: 150 Years of Aviation in Illinois.
