= Robbins, Illinois =

- Village
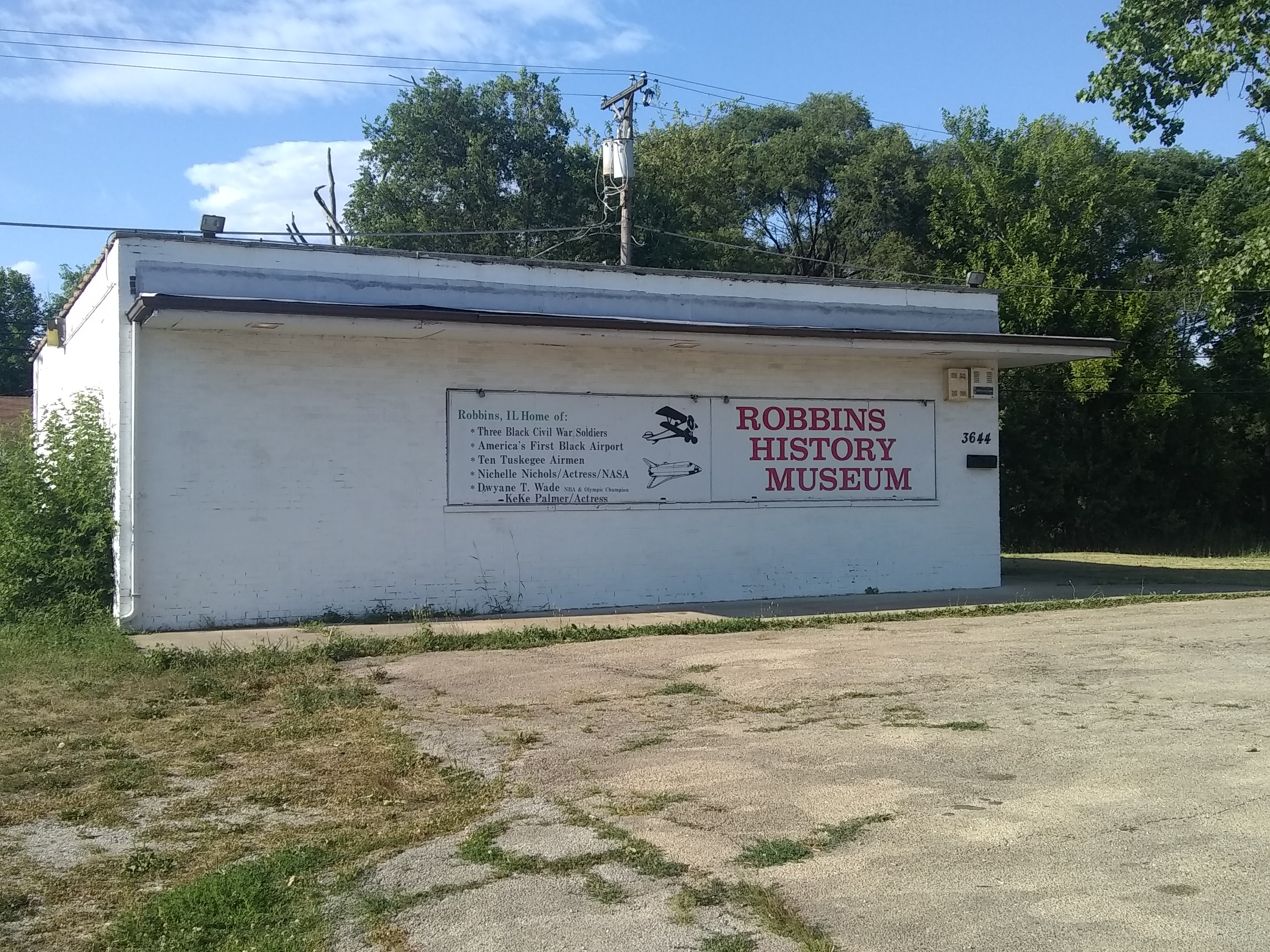
- Robbins History Museum

- Seal

- Location of Robbins in Cook County, Illinois.

- Location within Greater Chicago Location within Illinois Location within the United States
- Coordinates: 41°38′35″N 87°42′29″W
- Country: United States
- State: Illinois
- County: Cook
- Townships: Bremen, Worth
- Incorporated: 1917

Government
  - Mayor: Darren Bryant

Area
  - Total: 1.45 sq mi (3.75 km^{2})
  - Land: 1.45 sq mi (3.75 km^{2})
  - Water: 0 sq mi (0.00 km^{2}) 0%

Population (2020)
  - Total: 4,629
  - Density: 3,194.8/sq mi (1,233.52/km^{2})

Standard of living (2007-11)
  - Per capita income: $13,089
  - Median home value: $77,600
- ZIP code(s): 60472
- Area code(s): 708/464
- Geocode: 64616
- FIPS code: 17-64616
- Website: www.robbins-il.com

Robbins is a village and south suburb of Chicago in Cook County, Illinois, United States. The population was 4,629 at the 2020 census. It is the second oldest African American incorporated town in the north following Brooklyn, Illinois, and was home to the country's first black-owned airport, Robbins Airport.

== History ==
Robbins was incorporated on December 14, 1917 and named for Eugene S. Robbins, a real estate developer who laid out the village's early subdivisions. The village's founder and first mayor was Thomas J. Kellar, who noted in an early interview "Our people in Robbins are mostly people who got tired of the white fights and the crowded city. They come out here to raise chickens, make gardens, and be a little more free". Robbins was the only municipality in the north that was entirely governed by African-Americans. Kellar, who was a clerk for the Cook County Board of Assessors, was tasked with investigating the procedures of incorporation. Thomas J. Kellar School in Robbins was named in his honor and first opened for the 1954 school year.
After incorporation the community became a popular recreation spot for black Chicagoans, who crowded its picnic grounds and nightclubs on summer weekends.

== Geography ==
According to the 2010 census, Robbins has a total area of 1.45 square miles (3.76 km^{2}), all land.

== Demographics ==
Historical population
Census	Pop.	Note	%±
1920	431		—
1930	753		74.7%
1940	1,349		79.2%
1950	4,766		253.3%
1960	7,511		57.6%
1970	9,641		28.4%
1980	8,853		−8.2%
1990	7,498		−15.3%
2000	6,635		−11.5%
2010	5,337		−19.6%
2020	4,629		−13.3%
U.S. Decennial Census; 2010 2020

=== Racial and ethnic composition ===
Robbins village, Illinois – Racial and ethnic composition Note: the US Census treats Hispanic/Latino as an ethnic category. This table excludes Latinos from the racial categories and assigns them to a separate category. Hispanics/Latinos may be of any race.
Race / Ethnicity (NH = Non-Hispanic)	Pop 2000	Pop 2010	Pop 2020	% 2000	% 2010	% 2020
White alone (NH)	156	117	240	2.35%	2.19%	5.18%
Black or African American alone (NH)	6,288	4,990	3,908	94.77%	93.50%	84.42%
Native American or Alaska Native alone (NH)	8	11	2	0.12%	0.21%	0.04%
Asian alone (NH)	4	6	10	0.06%	0.11%	0.22%
Native Hawaiian or Pacific Islander alone (NH)	0	0	0	0.00%	0.00%	0.00%
Other race alone (NH)	11	1	20	0.17%	0.02%	0.43%
Mixed race or Multiracial (NH)	39	37	103	0.59%	0.69%	2.23%
Hispanic or Latino (any race)	129	175	346	1.94%	3.28%	7.47%
Total	6,635	5,337	4,629	100.00%	100.00%	100.00%

=== 2020 census ===
As of the 2020 census, Robbins had a population of 4,629. The population density was 3,194.62 inhabitants per square mile (1,233.45/km^{2}). The median age was 41.1 years. 21.7% of residents were under the age of 18 and 16.4% were 65 years of age or older. For every 100 females there were 97.8 males, and for every 100 females age 18 and over there were 96.8 males age 18 and over. 100.0% of residents lived in urban areas, while 0.0% lived in rural areas.

There were 1,585 households and 951 families in Robbins, of which 31.7% had children under the age of 18 living in them. Of all households, 20.5% were married-couple households, 26.4% were households with a male householder and no spouse or partner present, and 47.8% were households with a female householder and no spouse or partner present. About 36.5% of all households were made up of individuals and 14.4% had someone living alone who was 65 years of age or older. The average household size was 3.96 and the average family size was 2.97.

There were 1,887 housing units at an average density of 1,302.28 per square mile (502.81/km^{2}). Of all housing units, 16.0% were vacant. The homeowner vacancy rate was 3.0% and the rental vacancy rate was 8.1%.

=== Income and poverty ===
The median income for a household in the village was $35,815, and the median income for a family was $59,538. Males had a median income of $27,092 versus $26,667 for females. The per capita income for the village was $16,108. About 20.3% of families and 33.8% of the population were below the poverty line, including 36.9% of those under age 18 and 21.4% of those age 65 or over.

== Government ==
Robbins is in Illinois's 1st congressional district.

=== Municipal government ===
After its founding on December 14, 1917, Robbins garnered note as the first municipality in the Northern United States to be entirely governed by African-American officials. The municipality's first election was held on January 15, 1918, with Thomas J. Kellar elected as the mayor and six trustees empaneled (Richard Flowers, Leroy P. Thomas, R. H. Bryant, Jerry Taylor, Edward Brown, George Winburn).

==== Mayors ====
In April 2021, Darren E. Bryant was elected mayor of Robbins. At age 29, he was the youngest African-American mayor to have ever been elected in Illinois.

Number	Image	Mayor	Years	Notes/Citation
1		Thomas J. Kellar (1st term)	Jan 1918; 1919–1920	
2		R. H. Bryant	1921–1922	
3		Richard Flowers (1st term)	1923–1924	
(1)		Thomas J. Kellar (2nd term)	1925–1926	
(3)		Richard Flowers (2nd term)	1927–1928	
4		Samuel E. Nichols	1929–1930	
(1)		Thomas J. Kellar (3rd term)	1931–1932	
5		John S. Richardson (1st term)	1933–1940	
6		Hollis L. Reeves	1941–1950	
(5)		John S. Richardson (2nd term)	1951–1952	
7		Theodore Hendricks	1953–1956	
8		Ernest Maxey	1957–1969	
9		Marion L. Smith	1969–1981	
10		Richard Ballentine	1981–1985	
11		John W. Hamilton	1985–1989	
12		Irene Brodie	1989–2013	
13		Tyrone Ward	2013–2021	
14		Darren E. Bryant	2021–	

==== Police department ====
As of 2024, the Robbins police department had under its employment 46 police officers who had been fired from other police departments, a number higher than any other police department in Illinois.

== Transportation ==
Robbins is served by a station on Metra's Rock Island District commuter rail line. Robbins is served by two Pace bus routes, 359 Robbins/South Kedzie Avenue and 385 87th/111th/127th.

Interstate 294 runs through Robbins, but it has no exits within the village limits. Access to Interstates 57 and 294 are within a five- to eight-minute drive.

Midway International Airport is within 25-30 minute drive. The village is home to MDW's southern approach radar tower. O'Hare International Airport is within a 30-45 minute drive via Interstate 294 using the IL-50/ 83 Cicero Exit.

Robbins Airport, the first to be owned and operated by African-Americans in the United States, was located here from 1930 to 1933. It had the only flight school at the time where African-Americans could be trained as pilots, and served as a model for the Tuskegee Airmen Program during World War II. Many great African-American pilots flew into this forgotten airport. The surrounding white communities, such as Blue Island and Midlothian, did not approve of this activity, and their police sometimes arrested black pilots after they had landed in Robbins. The one-runway airport and hangar were destroyed by a tornado in 1933. School and operations were relocated by the invitation of white owners of the Harlem Airport in Chicago (it was located south of present-day Midway International Airport). From there, many of the flight school instructors entered the Tuskegee Airmen Program. One notable instructor and the man considered to be the founder of the Robbins airport was John C. Robinson, who was Supreme Commander of the Ethiopian Air Force when Italy invaded Ethiopia in 1935. The activities of these men and women have been recognized by the Smithsonian Institution's Air and Space Museum.

== Education ==
Posen-Robbins School District 143½ serves Robbins.

== Notable people ==
- Jan Bradley, soul singer ("Mama Didn't Lie"); grew up in Robbins
- Bessie Coleman, co-founder of the Robbins Airport with aviators John C. Robinson (aviator) and Cornelius Coffey, an operations center for black aviation
- S. B. Fuller, businessman (founded Fuller Products Company) and publisher (New York Age and Pittsburgh Courier)
- Thomas J. Kellar, founding mayor of Robbins
- James Loving, wide receiver for Philadelphia Eagles
- Joe Montgomery, running back with the New York Giants and Carolina Panthers; born in Robbins
- Nichelle Nichols, actress, known for playing Uhura in Star Trek; born Grace Nichols in Robbins
- Keke Palmer, actress, TV show host, singer, activist, fashion designer, known for movie Akeelah and the Bee; grew up in Robbins
- Jim Smith, wide receiver for Pittsburgh Steelers, two-time Super Bowl champion; grew up in Robbins
- Dwyane Wade, former NBA shooting guard, three-time NBA champion; grew up in Robbins
