= List of women aviators =

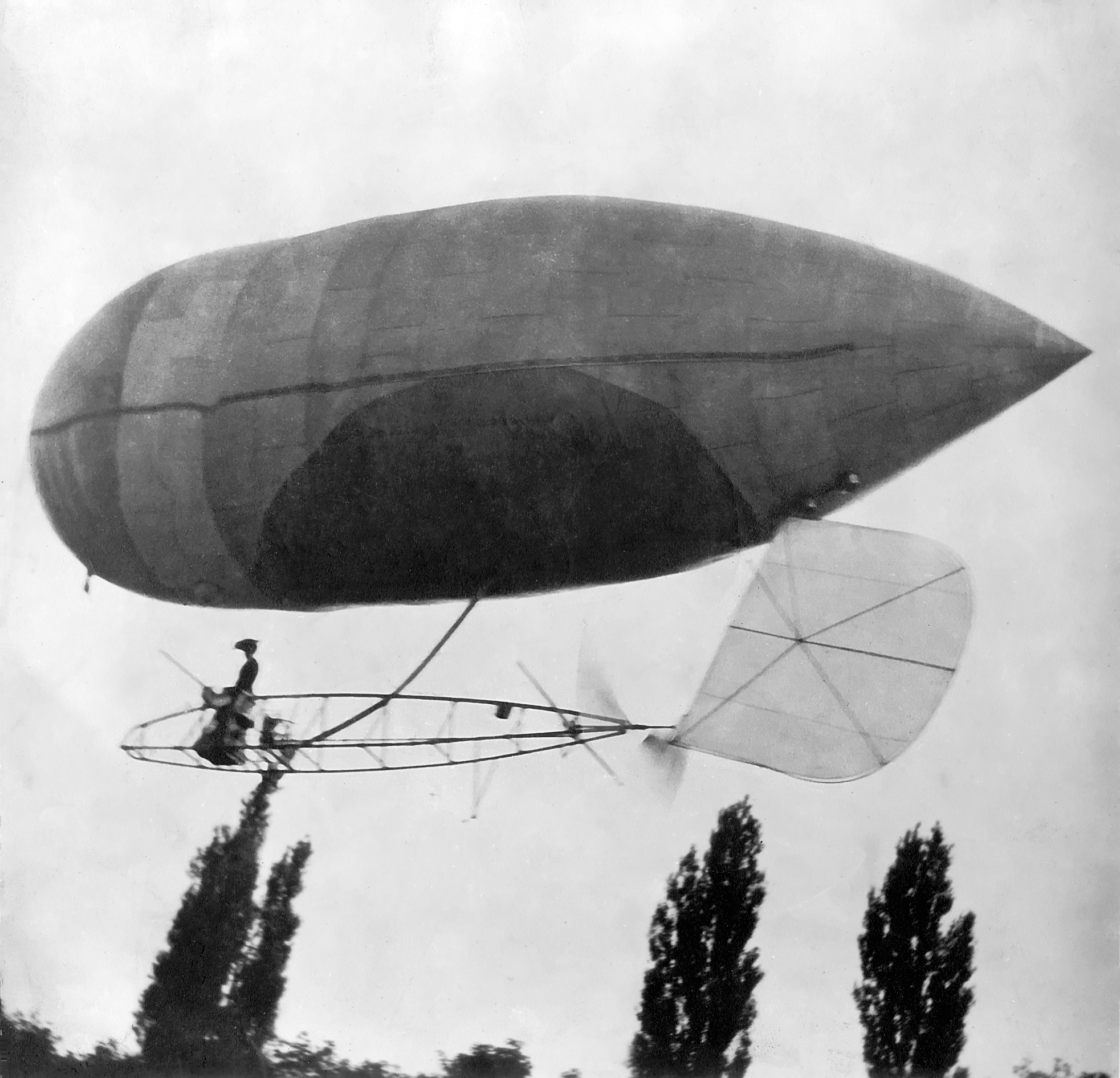
Aida de Acosta flying the airship Baladeuse in 1903 – the first woman to pilot a powered aircraft

This is a list of women aviators — women prominent in the field of aviation as constructors, designers, pilots and patrons.

It also includes a list of their relevant organisations such as the Betsy Ross Air Corps and Women's Royal Air Force.

== Individuals ==
=== A ===
- Amen Aamir, first women from Gilgit-Baltistan to qualify as a pilot
- Asli Hassan Abade, First African female fighter jet pilot. A prominent Somali Air Force pilot, military figure, and civil activist.
- Aida de Acosta (1884–1962), first woman to fly a powered aircraft alone
- Margaret Adams, Australian aviator; first president of the Australian Women's Flying Club, in 1938
- Zoya Agarwal, world's youngest woman pilot to fly the Boeing 777 (2013), captained world's longest flight route over North Pole (2021)
- Leman Altınçekiç (1932–2001), first female accredited jet pilot (1958) in Turkey and NATO.
- Gaby Angelini (1911–1932), first Italian woman to complete a trans-European flight
- Princess Anne of Löwenstein-Wertheim-Freudenberg (1864–1927), second woman to attempt a flight across the Atlantic. Her plane never arrived, with she and her crew presumed dead.
- Kimberly Anyadike (born 1994), youngest African-American female pilot to complete a transcontinental flight
- Cecilia Aragon (born 1960), first Latina pilot on the United States Aerobatic Team
- Tamar Ariel (1989–2014), Israel's first Jewish female religiously observant air force pilot, in 2012
- Jacqueline Auriol (1917–2000), French test pilot who rivalled Jacqueline Cochran in breaking speed records
- Micky Axton (1919–2010), one of the first three Women Air Force Service Pilots (WASPs) to be trained as a test pilot; first woman to fly a B-29

Lilian Bland flying the Mayfly in 1911. She built the aircraft herself to become the first woman to fly in Ireland.

=== B ===
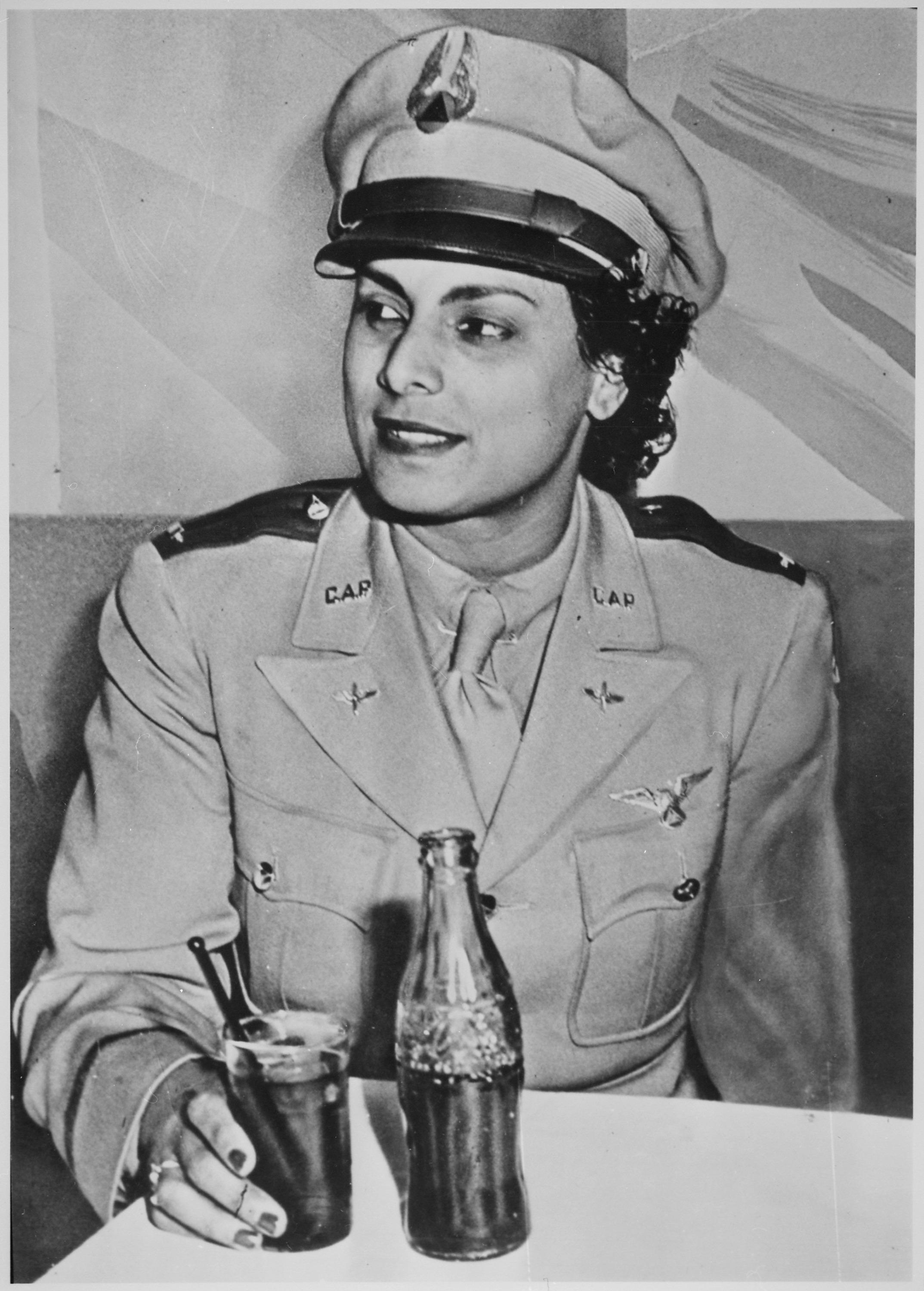
Willa Brown, the first African-American woman to receive a commission as a lieutenant in the U.S. Civil Air Patrol

- Mary, Lady Bailey (1890-1960), Anglo-Irish aviator who flew from Croydon to Cape Town and back again, at the same time that her friend, Mary, Lady Heath, was making her one-way flight from Cape Town to Croydon.
- Pancho Barnes (1901–1975), granddaughter of balloonist Thaddeus Lowe; founded the Women's Air Reserve, Associated Motion Picture Pilots and became the "mother of the Air Force"
- Mary Barr (1925–2010), first female pilot to join the US Forest Service and become National Aviation Safety Officer
- Jean Batten (1909–1982), made first solo flight from United Kingdom to New Zealand in the 1930s
- Ann Baumgartner (1918–2008), test pilot; first American woman to fly a U.S. Army Air Forces jet aircraft (a Bell YP-59A jet fighter)
- Amelie Beese (1886–1925), first woman pilot in Germany
- Elly Beinhorn (1907–2007), German enthusiast who made long-distance flights on every continent and flew around the world
- Velta Benn (1917–2010), American pilot, first woman to land a military jet on a Navy aircraft carrier
- Dagny Berger (1903–1950), Norway's first woman aviator
- Susana Ferrari Billinghurst (1914–1999), Argentinian pilot; first woman in South America to gain a commercial pilot's license, in 1937
- Lilian Bland (1878–1971), built her own aircraft; first woman to fly in Ireland
- Line Bonde (born c.1979), first Danish woman to become a fighter pilot, in 2006
- Maude Bonney (1897–1994), Australian aviator who was the first female to fly from England to Australia in 1933 and to South Africa in 1937.
- Ana Branger (born early 1920s), early Venezuelan aviator
- Jill E. Brown (born 1950), first African American female pilot for a major US carrier
- Willa Brown (1906–1992), first black woman to hold both a commercial and private license in the US; founded the National Negro Airmen Association of America; first black female to be an officer in the Civil Air Patrol
- Mrs Victor Bruce (1895–1990), born Mildred Mary but most famous by her married name; first woman to fly around the world alone and the first to be prosecuted for speeding
- Millicent Bryant (1878–1927), first woman to earn a pilot's license in Australia
- Beverly Burns (born 1949), American pilot, possibly the first woman to captain a jumbo jet (see Lynn Rippelmeyer)

=== C ===
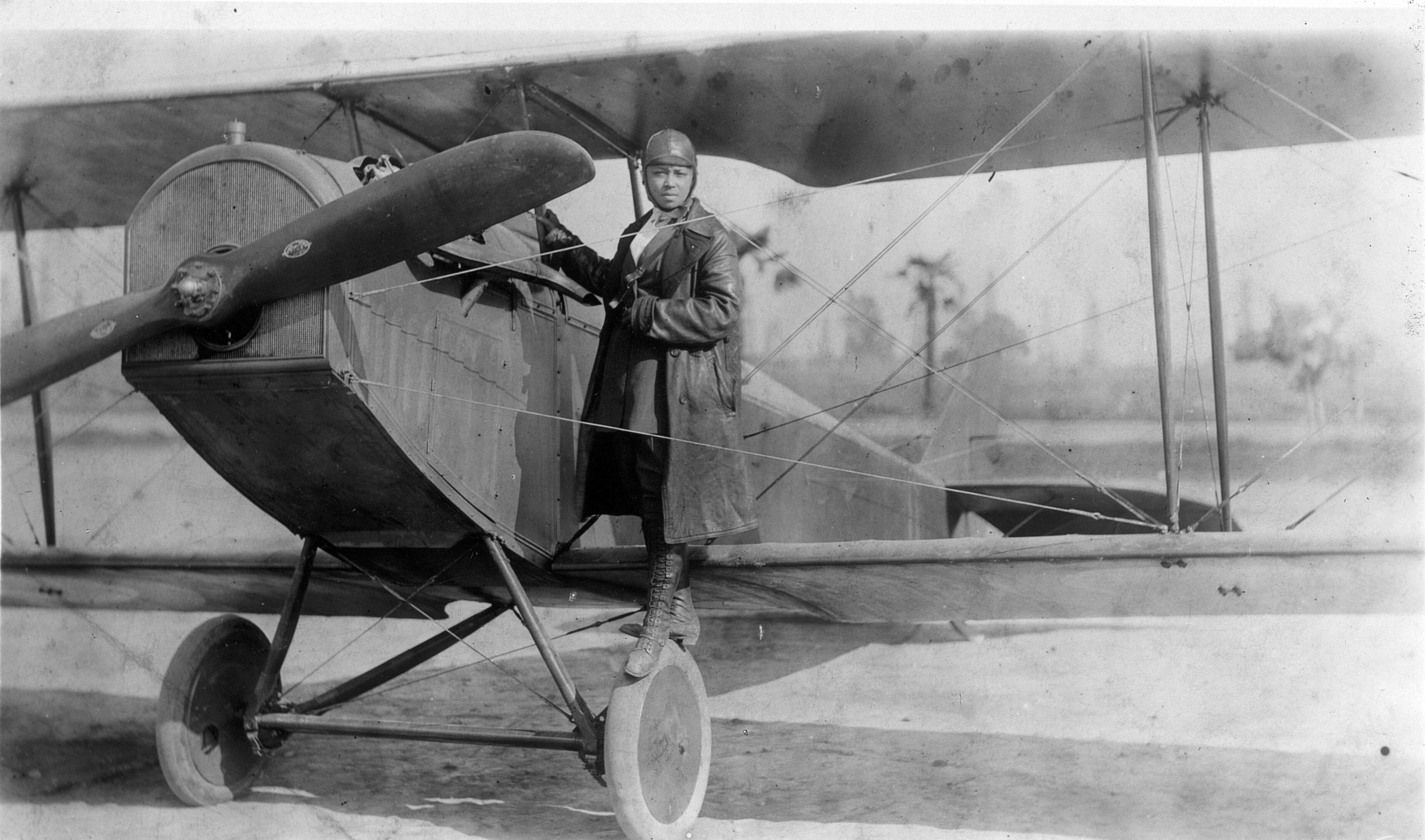
Bessie Coleman in 1922

- Mary Calcaño (1906–1992), first Venezuelan woman to be granted a pilot's license
- Traniela Campolieto, first transgender woman to be an arline pilot in the history of Argentina and of Latin America.
- Maie Casey (1892–1983), first patron of the Australian Association of Woman Pilots

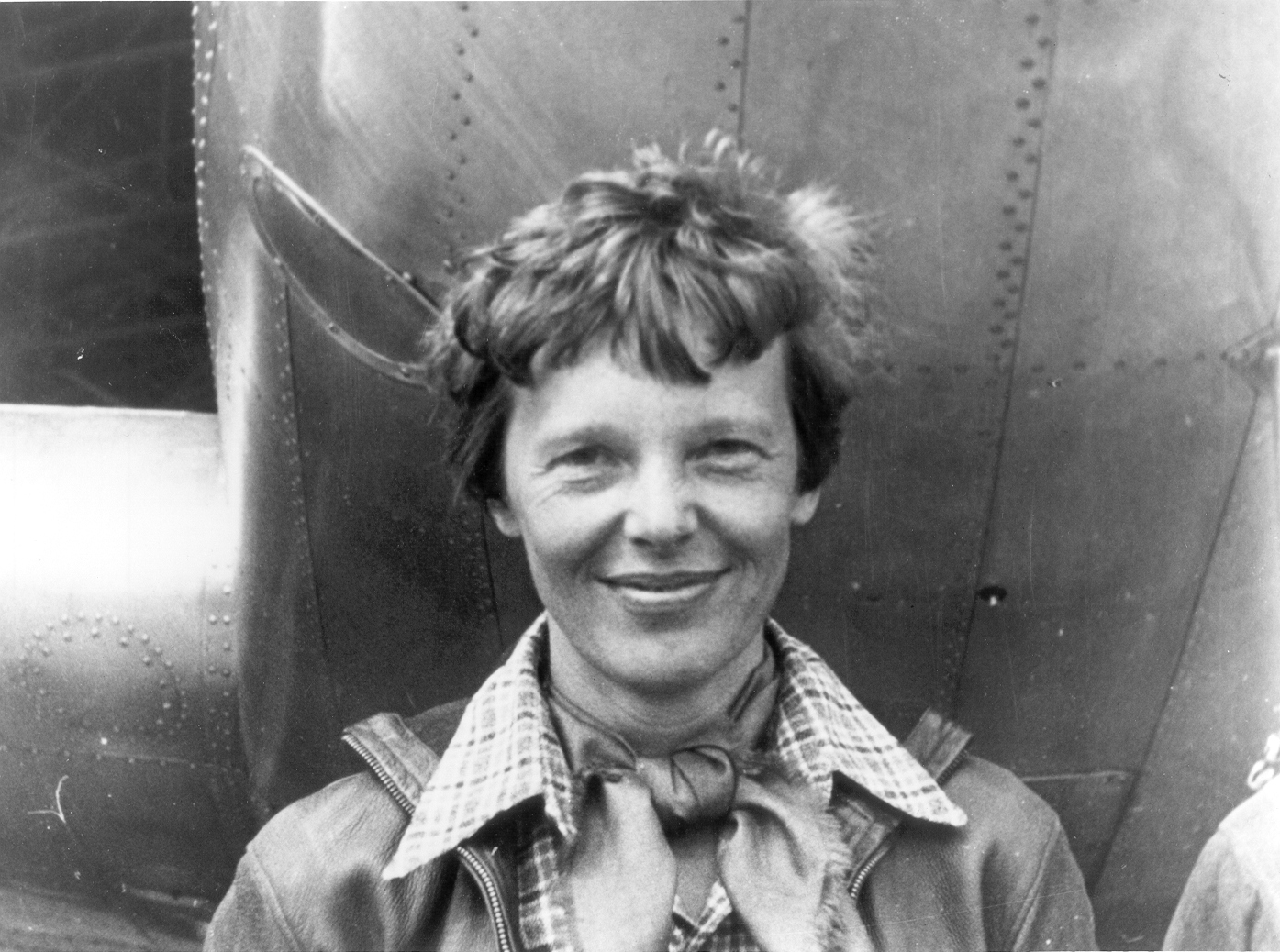
Amelia Earhart standing under nose of her Lockheed Model 10-E Electra

- Pearl Laska Chamberlain (1909–2012), first woman to solo a single-engine airplane up the Alaska Highway (1946)
- Touria Chaoui (1936–1959), first female pilot in Morocco at sixteen years old
- Katherine Cheung (1904–2003), first Chinese-American woman to get a pilot's license
- Karen Chilton Cunningham (born 1956), First woman to pilot the KC135 Q model refueling the SR71, first group of 10 ROTC women to go to pilot training (1978)
- Robyn Clay-Williams, one of the first two female pilots in the Royal Australian Air Force and the service's first female test pilot
- Jerrie Cobb (1931–2019), first woman to fly in the Paris Air Show and to be tested as an astronaut
- Jacqueline Cochran (1908–1980), first woman to fly faster than the speed of sound
- Bessie Coleman (1892–1926), first African-American woman pilot, earned her license in France 1921
- Eileen Collins (born 1956), former test pilot and NASA astronaut; first female pilot and first female commander of a space shuttle
- Linda Corbould, first woman to command a Royal Australian Air Force flying squadron
- Nancy Corrigan (1912–1983), an Irish-born, early U.S. aviator who became a successful instructor and commercial pilot
- Jessica Cox (born 1983), world's first armless licensed pilot
- Mary Rawlinson Creason (1924–2021), first woman hired by the Government of Michigan
- Gráinne Cronin (born c. 1953), first female pilot hired by Aer Lingus, the national airline of Ireland
- Yvonne Cunha (1945-2023), first Belgian woman to become a commercial airline pilot
- Lettice Curtis (1915–2014), early member of the Air Transport Auxiliary; first woman to fly a four-engined bomber

=== D ===
- Mildred Inks Davidson Dalrymple (1920–2012), military aviator
- Susan Darcy (born 1956), first female test pilot for Boeing
- Irene Dean-Williams (1903–1946) Australian aviator
- Patricia A. Denkler (born 1952), first woman to land a plane on an aircraft carrier.
- Mildred Doran (1905-1927), only woman to enter the Dole Air Race from California to Hawaii. Her plane, the Miss Doran, was one of two that went missing during the race, their occupants presumed dead.
- Vera Strodl Dowling (1918–2015), Danish World War II test pilot and later flight instructor in Alberta, Canada
- Mariana Drăgescu (1912–2013), Romanian military pilot in World War II
- Winifred Drinkwater (1913-1996), identified modifications that improved the performance of the Hurricane and Spitfire. Drinkwater is commemorated by a mural in Cardonald, Glasgow
- Margot Duke, Marchioness of Reading (1919–2015), society beauty who was one of the first women in Britain to get a pilot's license
- Maxine Dunlap (1908–1977), first woman glider pilot and first woman glider club president in the U.S.
- Hélène Dutrieu (1877–1961), first woman pilot in Belgium and to carry a passenger; caused a sensation by flying without a corset

=== E ===
- Amelia Earhart (1897–1937), first woman to fly solo across the Atlantic
- Amelia Rose Earhart (born 1983), reporter and pilot
- Ruth Elder (1902–1977), pilot and actress known as the "Miss America of Aviation"
- Mary Ellis (1917–2018), one of the last surviving British women pilots from World War II
- Lotfia Elnadi (1907–2002), the first African woman, first Arab woman, and first Egyptian woman to earn her pilot’s license in 1933.

=== F ===
- Rosina Ferrario (1888–1957), first Italian woman to receive a pilot's license, in January 1913
- Amalia Celia Figueredo (1895–1985), Argentine aviator; first woman in Argentina, and possibly Latin America, to obtain a pilot's license in 1914 with Paul Castaibert
- Kathleen Fox (born 1951), Canadian flight instructor, air traffic controller and business executive
- Mathilde Franck (1866–1956), early French aviator; learned to fly in 1910
- Elisabeth Friske (died 1987), first West German woman to become a commercial airline pilot
- Wally Funk (born 1939), one of the Mercury 13; first female air safety investigator at the FAA

=== G ===
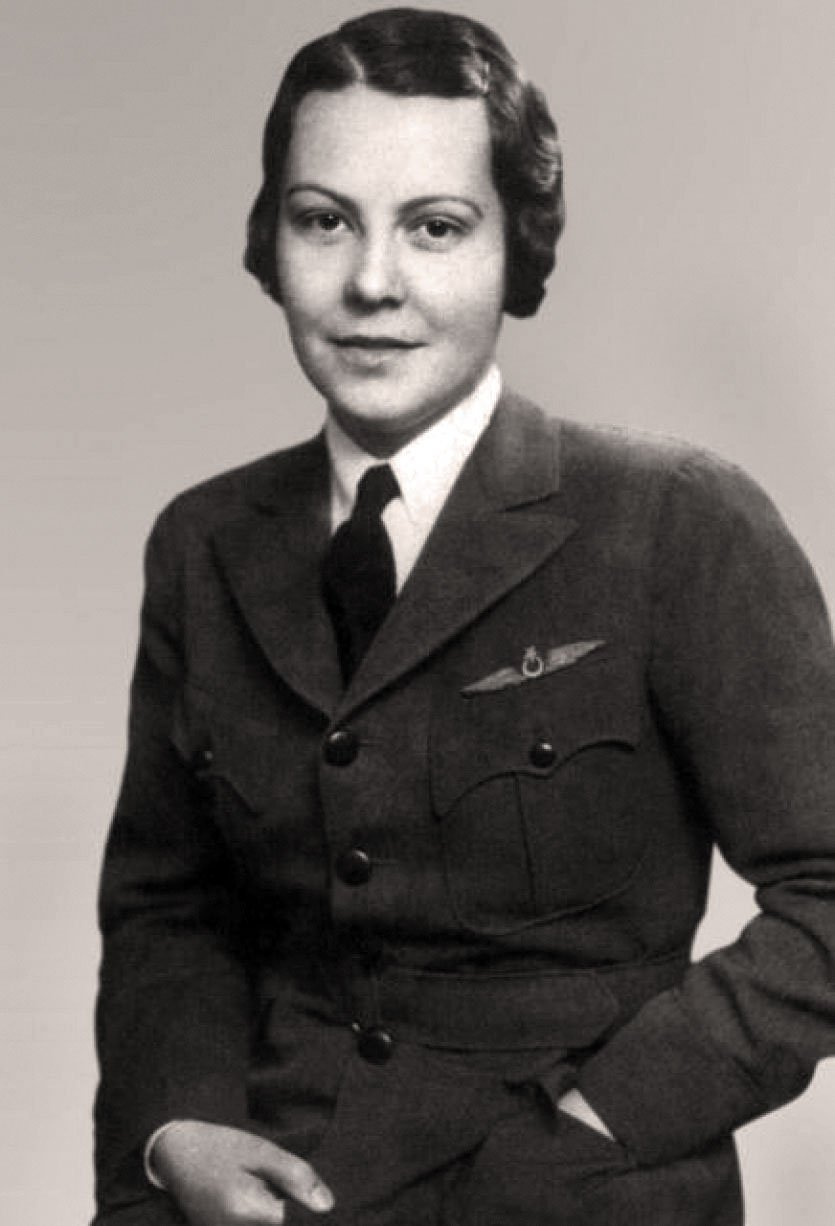
World's first female combat pilot, Sabiha Gökçen.

- Maggie Gee (1923–2013), American aviator who served in the Women Airforce Service Pilots (WASPs) in World War II
- Julie Ann Gibson (born 1956), Flight Lieutenant Julie Ann Gibson was the first full-time female pilot for the Royal Air Force when she graduated in 1991
- Betty Gillies (1908–1998), pioneering American aviator; first pilot to qualify for the Women's Auxiliary Ferrying Squadron
- Ninel Gharajyan (1916-2001) became the first Armenian woman pilot and parachutist.
- Maya Ghazal, Syrian refugee and pilot
- Sabiha Gökçen (1913–2001), adopted by Kemal Atatürk; World's first female combat pilot
- Patricia Graham (1928–2016), Australian aviator, founding member of the Australian Women Pilots' Association in 1950
- Frances Wilson Grayson (1892-1927), disappeared, presumed dead, while flying from Long Island to Newfoundland, where she and her crew had planned to attempt at a transatlantic flight.
- Valentina Grizodubova (1909–1993), long distance flyer and wartime hero; the most decorated woman in the Soviet Union
- Mette Grøtteland (born 1969), first female fighter pilot of The Royal Norwegian Air Force.

=== H ===
- Melissa Haney (born 1981), Air Inuit's first female Inuk pilot to become captain
- Else Haugk (1889–1973), first Swiss woman to earn a pilot's license, in May 1914
- Mary, Lady Heath (1896–1939), first woman to fly solo across Africa from Cape Town to Cairo
- Janet Hendry (1906-2004), first woman pilot in Scotland
- Jane Herveu (1885–1955), pioneering French aviator; received her license on 7 December 1910
- Hilda Hewlett (1864–1943), first woman to get a British pilot's license and to open the first flying school there
- Trevor Hunter (1915–2002), early New Zealand aviator
- Tadashi Hyōdō (1899–1980), first woman to obtain a pilot's license in Japan, in March 1922.

=== J ===
- Gidsken Jakobsen (1908–1990), Norwegian aviation pioneer
- Suzanne Jannin (1912–1982), French Air Force pilot in Indochina
- Mary Goodrich Jenson (1907–2004), first woman to fly solo to Cuba; first woman to earn a pilot's license in Connecticut
- Amy Johnson (1903–1941), first woman to fly from England to Australia alone

=== K ===
- Elvy Kalep (1899–1989), Estonia's first female pilot
- Irena Kempówna (1920-2002), Polish glider pilot, record-breaking aviator and flight instructor.
- Shawna Rochelle Kimbrell (born 1976), first African American female fighter pilot in U.S. Air Force
- Zinaïda Kokorina (1898–1980), Russian pilot and flight instructor, in 1925 became the world's first female military pilot
- Opal Kunz (1894–1967), founding member and first president of the Ninety-Nines; founding member and first president of the Betsy Ross Air Corps; as an instructor in the Civilian Pilot Training Program, she trained over 400 cadets in the Air Corps during World War II
- Kwon Ki-ok (1901-1988), first woman aviator in Korea, who became a lieutenant colonel in the air force for the Republic of China. Went on to help found the South Korean Air Force.

=== L ===
- Raymonde de Laroche (1882–1919), first woman in the world to get a pilot's license
- Constance Leathart (1903–1993), first British woman outside London to get a pilot's license
- Hazel Ying Lee (1912–1944), Chinese-American pilot who flew for the U.S. Army Air Forces during World War II
- Olga Lisikova (1916–2011), only woman pilot-in-command of a C-47 Skytrain in the Soviet Air Force
- Lydia Litvyak (1921–1943), fighter ace; first woman to shoot down an aircraft
- Ila Loetscher (1904–2000), female aviation pioneer and activist on behalf of sea turtles
- Rose Lok (1912–1978), first female Chinese-American pilot in New England
- Linda Pauwels (1963–), First Latina Captain and First Latina Check Airman at American Airlines, as well as the youngest woman jet captain (cargo) at age 25

=== M ===
- Elsie MacGill (1905–1980), world's first female aircraft designer, known as "Queen of the Hurricanes"
- Elsie Mackay (1893-1928), former actress and daughter of Viscount Inchcape, who went missing, presumed dead, during an attempt to fly the Atlantic from England to Long Island.
- Beryl Markham (1902–1986), first woman to fly west across the Atlantic alone, direct from England to North America
- Marie Marvingt (1875–1963), first woman to fly from Europe to England across the North Sea by balloon
- Angela Masson (born 1951), first woman to qualify to fly a jumbo jet
- Luisa Elena Contreras Mattera (1922–2006), in 1943, first woman to be granted a pilot's license in Venezuela
- Marie McMillin (1902–1954), American aviator, served in the Women's Army Corps
- Suzanne Melk (1908–1951), the first known woman in France to fly and the first woman in Europe to receive a pilot's license in 1935
- Pamela Melroy (born 1961), former NASA astronaut who served as pilot and commander on Space Shuttle missions
- Betty Miller (1926–2018), first woman to fly solo across the Pacific
- Violet Milstead (1919–2014), Canadian Air Transport Auxiliary pilot during WWII and the first female bush pilot
- Karina Miranda, Chilean Air Force combat aviator and the first woman from her country to break the sound barrier
- Jerrie Mock (1925–2014), first woman to fly solo around the world
- Matilde Moisant (1878-1964), second American woman to earn her pilot's license, won the Ron-Wadamaker Trophy for breaking the women's world altitude record about a month after qualifying. Gave up flying following a near-fatal crash on April 14, 1912.
- Jennifer Murray (born 1940), first woman to fly solo around the world in a helicopter
- Siza Mzimela, founder of South African airline

=== N ===
- Lyalya Nasukhanova (1939–2000), first Chechen woman pilot; rejected by the cosmonaut corps because of her ethnicity
- Yichida Ndlovu, first civilian pilot in Zambia
- Carina Negrone (1911–1991), Italian aviator; reached a record-breaking 12,043 meters (39,402 ft.) in a propeller-powered plane
- Ruth Nichols (1901–1960), set many aviation records and started the first air ambulance service in the US
- Marthe Niel (1878–1928), French aviator; second woman in the world to receive a pilot's license
- Sakhile Nyoni, first woman pilot in Botswana

=== O ===
- Sicele O'Brien (1887–1931), one of Ireland's pioneering female pilots who raced and set records in Europe and Africa in the 1920s
- Ruth Law Oliver, (1887–1970), American aviator who looped the loop twice at Daytona Beach in 1915. Went on to be the first woman pilot to wear a military uniform, and the first to deliver air mail to the Philippines
- Susan Oliver (1932–1990).
- Phoebe Omlie (1902–1975), first woman to receive an airplane mechanic's license; first licensed woman transport pilot

=== P ===
- Beverly Pakii, first female Papua New Guinean jet captain
- Suzanne Parish (1922–2010), member of the Women Airforce Service Pilots; co-founder of the Kalamazoo Aviation History Museum
- Ingrid Pedersen (1933–2012), first woman to fly over the North Pole
- Thérèse Peltier (1873–1926), French aviator; first woman to pilot a heavier-than-air craft at Turin in 1908

=== Q ===
- Harriet Quimby (1875–1912), first woman to get a U.S. pilot's license and fly across the English Channel

=== R ===
- Carol Rabadi (born 1977), Captain of the first all-female flight crew on Royal Jordanian
- Bessie Raiche (1875–1932), one of the first women to fly solo in the US (see Blanche Scott)
- Rosemary Rees (1901–1994), leading British aviator at the Air Transport Auxiliary
- Molly Reilly (1922–1980), first female Canadian pilot to reach the rank of captain, and the first woman to fly to the Arctic professionally
- Ruth Reinhold (1902–1985), one of Arizona's first female pilots
- Hanna Reitsch (1912–1979), German glider pilot who established many records and became a test pilot in WWII
- Ola Mildred Rexroat (1917–2017), only Native American woman to serve in the Women Airforce Service Pilots (WASPs)
- Helen Richey (1909–1947), first woman to be hired as a pilot by a commercial airline in the United States
- Mary Riddle (1902–1981), second Native American woman to earn a pilot's license after Bessie Coleman
- Isabel Rilvas (1935–2025), first Portuguese woman acrobatic pilot, parachutist and balloonist, who inspired the Portuguese Paratroop Nurses
- Margaret Ringenberg (1921–2008), started as a WASP and then won hundreds of trophies racing
- Lynn Rippelmeyer, one of the first women to captain a jumbo jet (see Beverly Burns)
- Ada Rogato (1910–1986), record-breaking Brazilian woman aviator
- Molly Rose (1920–2016), flew Spitfires for the Air Transport Auxiliary during WWII
- Gladys Roy (1896-1927), American barnstorming aviator, who made daring stunts such as walking across the wings blindfolded while airborne. Died while posing for photos when she accidentally walked into a spinning propeller.
- Nadia Russo (1901–1988), pioneering Romanian aviator
- Zara Rutherford (born 2002), youngest female pilot to fly solo around the world, at age 19
- Margaret Fane Rutledge (1914–2004), pioneering Canadian pilot

=== S ===
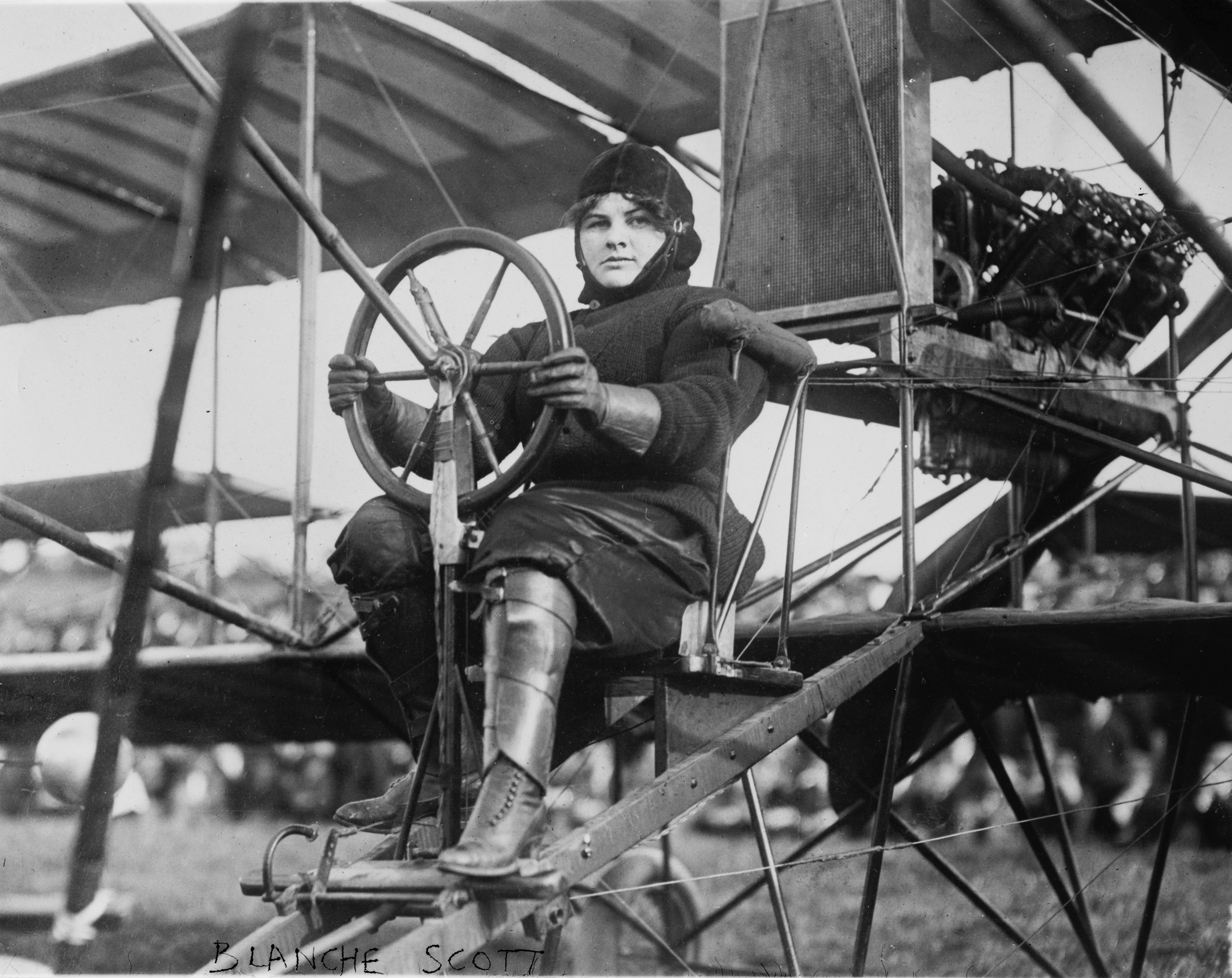
Blanche Scott, the "Tomboy of the Air"

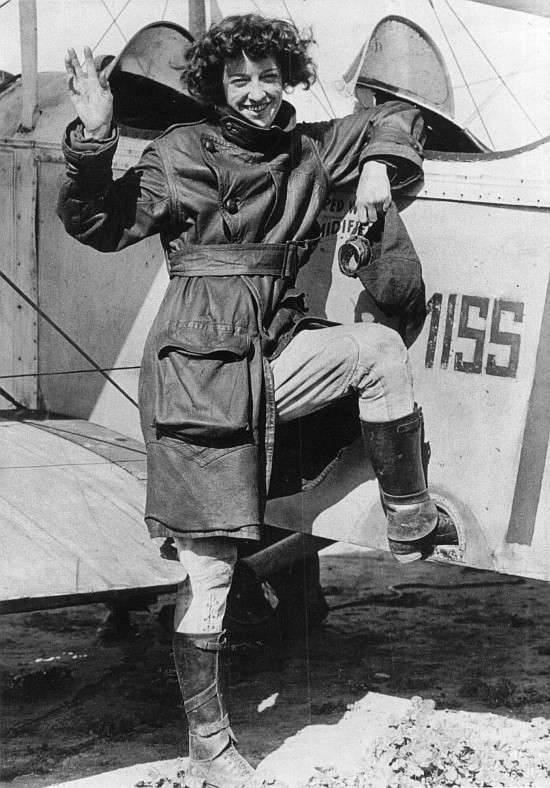
Neta Snook, who taught Amelia Earhart how to fly

- Maria de Lourdes Sá Teixeira (1907–1984), first Portuguese woman to hold a pilot's license
- Nicola Scaife, Australian hot-air balloonist; winner of the FAI Women's Championship in 2014 and 2016
- Melitta Schenk Gräfin von Stauffenberg (1903–1945), aeronautical engineer who became a Luftwaffe test pilot during WWII
- Linda Spoonster Schwartz (born 1944), Captain in the US Air Force, nurse, and veteran advocate
- Blanche Scott (1884–1970), possibly the first American women to fly solo (see Bessie Raiche)
- Eula Pearl Carter Scott (1915–2005), of Chickasaw Nation became the youngest pilot to solo in the U.S., at 13 in her Curtiss Robin OX-5 on September 12, 1929.
- Sheila Scott (1922–1988), first person to fly over the North Pole in a light aircraft
- Tammie Jo Shults (born 1961), one of the first US Navy fighter pilots and captain of Southwest Airlines Flight 1380
- Betty Skelton (1926–2011), the fastest woman on Earth
- Elinor Smith (1911–2010), "Flying Flapper of Freeport" who was, at age sixteen, the youngest licensed pilot in the world
- Ida Van Smith (1917–2003), educator who was the first African-American woman in the International Forest of Friendship
- Neta Snook (1896–1991), first woman to run an aviation business; taught Amelia Earhart how to fly
- Winifred Spooner (1900–1933), British aviator; most outstanding female aviator of 1929
- Katherine Stinson (1891–1977), "Flying Schoolgirl" who was the first woman to loop the loop; sister of Marjorie Stinson
- Marjorie Stinson (1895–1975), American exhibition pilot and instructor and the first female airmail pilot in the United States; sister of Katherine Stinson
- Marina Știrbei (1912–2001), Romanian aviator who founded the women's White Squadron in World War II
- Antonie Strassmann (1901–1952), German an aerobatic aviator (emigrated to the US in 1932), who flew a Zeppelin from Germany to Pernambuco, Brazil in 1932. She performed aerobatic flights, including at the 1930 National Air Races in Chicago, represented and consulted with aviation companies, and gave interviews to the press.
- Maguba Syrtlanova (1912–1971), flight instructor, flight commander, wartime hero.

=== T ===
- Louise Thaden (1905–1979), winner of the first Powder Puff Derby
- Penny Thompson (1917–1975), American aviator, promoter of women's intercontinental air shows, and aviation publisher
- Bonnie Tiburzi (born 1948), first female pilot for American Airlines and the first female pilot for a major American commercial airline.
- Bobbi Trout (1906–2003), set endurance records and was the first woman to fly all night
- Alia Twal (born 1988), gender equality advocate and first Jordanian women to become a liveryman in the Honourable Company of Air Pilots

=== V ===
- Polly Vacher (born 1944), flew solo around the world in a record-breaking small plane
- Amalia Villa de la Tapia (1893-1994), First Bolivian woman pilot and first South-American woman pilot to be licensed in Europe
- Dolors Vives Rodon (1909–2007), pioneering Catalan aviator

=== W ===
- Eleanor Wadsworth (1917–2020), English pilot and architect
- Patty Wagstaff (born 1951), first woman to win the US Aerobatic Championship
- Nancy Bird Walton (1915–2009), pioneering Australian aviator who founded the Australian Women Pilots' Association
- Zheng Wang (Julie Wang, Wang Zheng, 王争) (born 1972), first Asian woman to circumnavigate Earth in an airplane, first Chinese person to fly solo around-the-world; first Chinese female pilot to fly around the world
- Emily Howell Warner (1939–2020), first woman captain of a scheduled US airline
- Mora Weir (c 1891-1979) first woman to hold a rotorcraft licence, regularly flew her husband JG Weir from their home Skelton House in Ayrshire to the Weirs factory (now Weir Group) in Cathcart Glasgow
- Jo Claire Welch (1939-2018) Believed to be the first US woman hired as a commercial co-pilot, beginning 1969, for domestic commuter airline, Air East, with a flight from Houston to Austin
- Fay Gillis Wells (1908–2002), founder member of the Ninety-Nines and its first secretary; one of the earliest female members of the Caterpillar Club
- Cicely Ethel Wilkinson (c.1882–1967), pioneering British pilot
- Zoey Williams, first Black female pilot to fly a Boeing 777 for Air Canada
- Benedetta Willis (1914–2008), one of the first 5 women to get RAF wings, in the 1950s.
- Chresten Wilson (born 1962), First woman to become the most senior pilot at a major US airline (United Airlines, May 2026)
- Edna Gardner Whyte (1902–1992), trained many military pilots in WWII; first female member of the Daedalian fraternity
- Lucyna Wlazło-Bajewska Krzywonos (1928–2007), Polish glider pilot and instructor, set 6 world records and 11 national records

=== Y ===
- Patricia Yapp Syau Yin, Malaysian military pilot; first Asian woman to fly a MiG-29
- Jeana Yeager (born 1952), co-pilot of the first non-stop flight around the world without refueling

=== Z ===
- Vera Zakharova (1920–2010), first Yakut woman pilot
- Lydia Zvereva (1890–1916), first woman in Russia to earn a pilot's license

== Organisations ==
- Air Transport Auxiliary (ATA)
- Betsy Ross Air Corps
- Night Witches
- Ninety-Nines
- Whirly-Girls
- Women Airforce Service Pilots (WASP)
- Women in Aviation, International
- Women's Air Derby
- Women's Auxiliary Air Force (WAAF)
- Women's Flying Training Detachment
- Women's Royal Air Force

== See also ==
- Timeline of women in aviation
- Women in aviation
