= Branger =

Branger is a surname. Notable people with the surname include:

- Ana Branger (1918–?), Venezuelan aviator
- Johan Branger (born 1993), British footballer

== See also ==
- Branker
