= Mary Rawlinson Creason =

American aviator (1924–2021)

Mary Rawlinson Creason (November 20, 1924 – March 26, 2021) was an American aviator. She was the first woman pilot to work for the government of Michigan. She was recognized by the federal government for her aviation curriculum for school and for her work as an aviator. Well into her 90s, she continued to fly, despite having a pacemaker.

== Biography ==
Creason was born in Greenwood, Delaware on November 20, 1924. She had her first solo flight in 1943. She had learned to fly from her friends, a Kalamazoo flight instructor named Eloise Smith, and her sister, Mabel Rawlinson. Her sister died in 1943 in a plane crash at Camp Davis while volunteering for the Women Airforce Service Pilots (WASP). In 1944, Creason graduated from Western Michigan College. She earned her commercial pilot's license in 1946 and then earned other pilot ratings after.

Creason started her own business, Ottawa Air Training and Transport in 1967. She also worked for 13 years as an aviation instructor for Grand Haven High School and Muskegon Community College. Creason participated in the Powder Puff Derby in 1972 and her fifth race was in 1983.

Creason became the first woman pilot in the Michigan state government when she joined the Aeronautics Bureau of Michigan in 1977. She started as an aviation safety specialist. She worked for the Aeronautics Bureau until her retirement in 1989.

She also created the "Come Fly With Me" curriculum for Michigan's public schools, for which she was recognized in 1987 by the Federal Aviation Administration's "Administrator's Award for Excellence." She was inducted into the Michigan Aviation Hall of Fame in 1995. Creason was also inducted into the Michigan Transportation Hall of Honor in 2006.

As a senior citizen, she would fly her own plane down to her summer home in Florida and said she liked to fly "every day." After heart problems occurred, she was briefly grounded when she received a pacemaker. In 2015, she passed the tests and was allowed to fly again. She has made plans to land her plane in the 48 continental states.

Creason died on March 26, 2021, at the age of 96.
