= Blanche Stuart Scott =

American aviation pioneer (1885-1970)

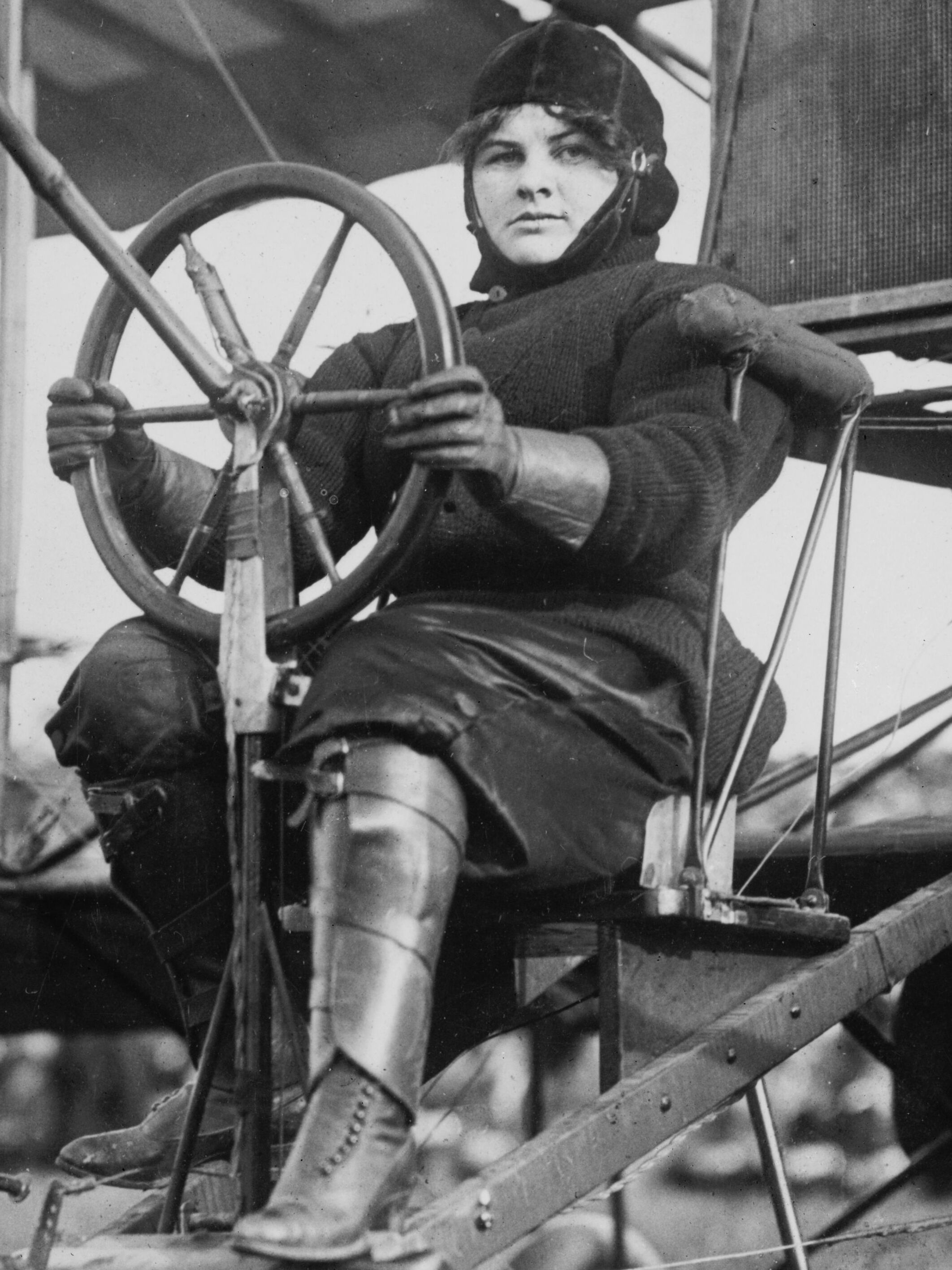
- Blanche Scott in her biplane, circa 1910-1916
- Born: April 8, 1885; Rochester, New York, U.S.
- Died: January 12, 1970 (aged 84); Rochester, New York, U.S.
- Resting place: Riverside Cemetery; Rochester, New York, U.S.
- Occupations: Aviator and scriptwriter

Blanche Stuart Scott (April 8, 1885 – January 12, 1970), also known as Betty Scott, was possibly the first American woman aviator. For her automobile journey across the United States she won the attention and admiration of pioneer aviator Glenn Curtiss who gave her flying lessons at the Curtiss flying school, in Hammondsport, New York, America's first flying school.

== Biography ==
=== Early life ===
Blanche Stuart Scott was born on April 8, 1885, in Rochester, New York, to Belle and John Scott. Her father was a successful businessman who manufactured and sold patent medicine. Scott was an early enthusiast of the automobile. Her father bought a car and, at age thirteen, she drove it about the city in a time before there were minimum age restrictions on driving, much less licensing programs. Her driving terrorized the streets of Rochester which led to an attempt by the city council to ban her from driving. In 1900 the family, still in Rochester, lived at 116 Weld Avenue. Scott's family considered her a tomboy and sent her to a finishing school.

=== Automobile adventure ===
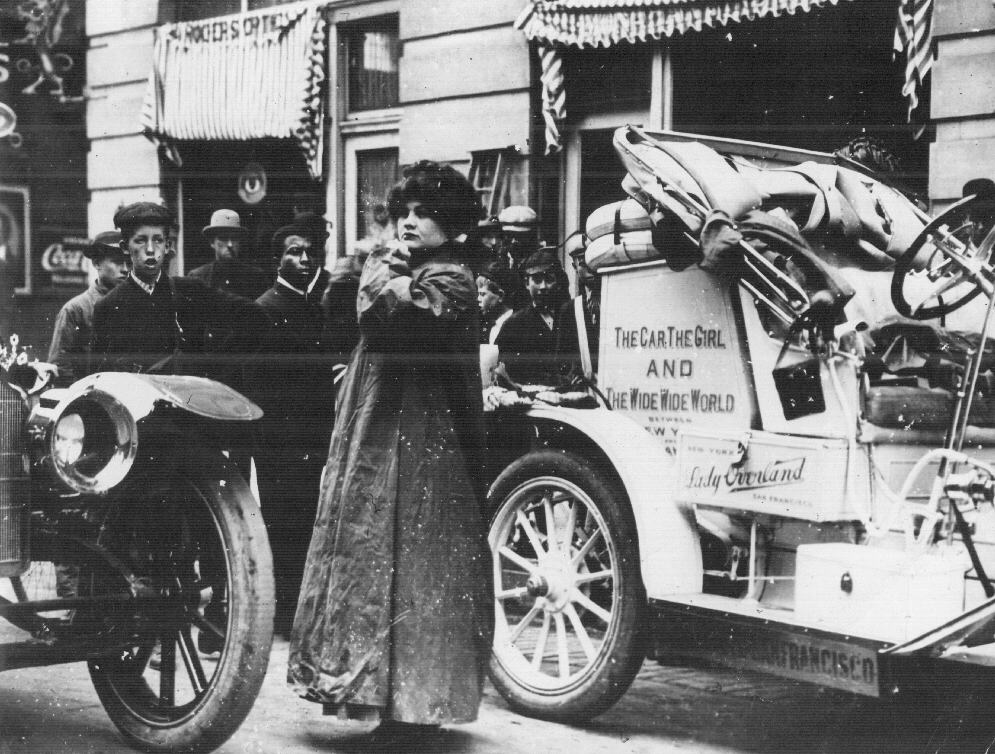
Blanche Scott's Lady Overland 1910 motor trip, stopping in Toledo

In 1910 Scott became the second woman, after Alice Huyler Ramsey, to drive a Willys-Overland Model 38 automobile across the United States and the first driving westwards from New York City to San Francisco, California. The trip was sponsored by the Willys-Overland Company and the car was named the "Lady Overland". Gertrude Buffington Phillips, a reporter, was her passenger. They left New York on May 16, 1910, and reached San Francisco on July 23, 1910. The New York Times wrote on May 17, 1910:

Miss Scott, with Miss Phillips as only companion, starts on long trip with the object of demonstrating the possibility of a woman driving a motor car across the country and making all the necessary repairs en route. Miss Blanche Stuart Scott yesterday started in an Overland automobile on a transcontinental journey which will end in San Francisco.

=== Achievements in aviation ===
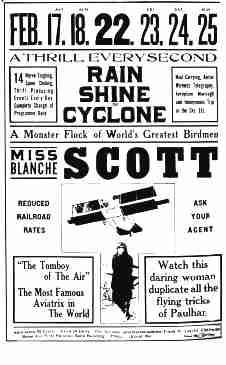
Poster for an air show in Oakland, California

The publicity surrounding the automobile journey brought her to the attention of Jerome Fanciulli and Glenn Curtiss who agreed to provide her with flying lessons in Hammondsport, New York. In 1911 Curtiss founded the first flying school in America at Hammondsport, New York. Here he taught Blanche Scott how to operate an airplane, where she subsequently became America's first female pilot. During this time Scott resided in Hammondsport at the home of Curtiss and his family. where Scott received her flying lessons. She was the only woman to receive instruction directly from Curtiss. He fitted a limiter on the throttle of Scott's airplane to prevent it gaining enough speed to become airborne while she practiced taxiing on her own. On September 6 either the limiter moved or a gust of wind lifted the biplane and she flew to an altitude of forty feet before executing a gentle landing. Her flight was short and possibly unintentional but Scott is credited by the Early Birds of Aviation as the first woman to pilot and solo in an airplane in the United States, although Bessica Medlar Raiche's flight on September 16 was accredited as first by the Aeronautical Society of America at the time.

She set a long-distance flying record for women of 10 miles on July 30, 1911 and then a 25-mile record in August of 1911. She was known as "The Tomboy of the Air" and went on to become the first female test pilot, for Glenn Martin in 1912.

Scott subsequently became a professional pilot. On October 24, 1910, she made her debut as a member of the Curtiss exhibition team at an air meet in Fort Wayne, Indiana. Upon her arrival at Fort Wayne, she had expected to find an adequate airfield, but instead found a race track at some fair grounds with much of the surface dug up and roughly flattened. After being advised not to take a chance in such conditions, she insisted. After enduring bumps and jolts, she managed to take off, flew eight revolutions around the grounds and landed safely. She became the first woman to fly at a public event in America. Her exhibition flying earned her the nickname "Tomboy of the Air". She became an accomplished stunt pilot known for flying upside down and performing "death dives", diving from an altitude of 4000 feet and suddenly pulling up only 200 feet from the ground. She set several distance flying records for women in 1911, including flying 10 miles on July 30, then a 25-mile record in August of 1911, and finally she became the first woman in America to fly long distance when she flew 60 miles non-stop from Mineola, New York. In 1912 Scott contracted to fly for Glenn Martin and became the first female test pilot when she flew Martin prototypes before the final blueprints for the aircraft had been made. In 1913 she joined the Ward exhibition team. After suffering a serious crash later that same year, she had a year-long period of recuperation. She retired from professional flying in 1916.

=== Scriptwriting and museum work ===
In the 1930s Scott worked as a scriptwriter for RKO, Universal Studios and Warner Brothers in California. She performed the lead role in the first movie made about flying, "The Aviator's Bride". She also wrote, produced and hosted the "Rambles with Roberta" radio shows in California and New York. On September 6, 1948, Scott became the first American woman to fly in a jet when she was the passenger in a TF-80C piloted by Chuck Yeager. Knowing Scott's history as a stunt pilot, Yeager treated her to some snap rolls and a 14,000 foot dive. In 1954 Scott began working for what was originally known as the United States Air Force Museum, in Dayton, Ohio, traveling extensively to acquire priceless early aviation artifacts for the museum's collection.

=== Death and legacy ===
Scott died on Monday, January 12, 1970, at Genesee Hospital in Rochester, New York, at age 84. She was cremated at Mount Hope Cemetery. She was cremated and her ashes were interred at Rochester's Riverside Cemetery.

On December 30, 1980, the United States Postal Service issued an air mail stamp commemorating Scott's achievements in aviation. In 2005, Scott was inducted into the National Women's Hall of Fame.

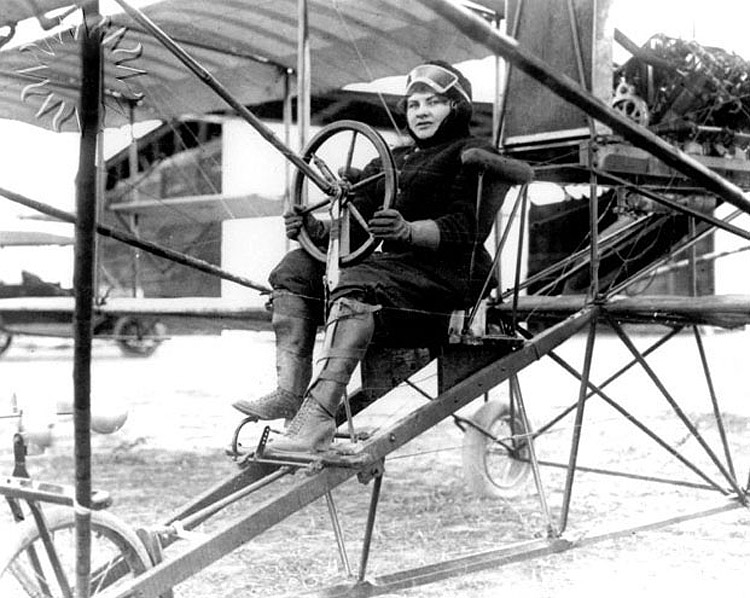

== Sources ==
- Cummins, Julie (2001). Tomboy of the air : daredevil pilot Blanche Stuart Scott. New York: HarperCollins Publishers. ISBN 978-0-06029-2430.
- Merrill, Arch (1944). The Lakes Country. Rochester, New York: Louis Heindl & Son.
- Trenton Evening Times; Trenton, New Jersey, May 28, 1910; Blanche Scott at Roycroft Fair
- The New York Times; May 17, 1910, page 11, Woman to drive auto to Frisco: Miss Scott, with Miss Phillips as Only Companion, Starts on Long Trip. With the object of demonstrating the possibility of a woman driving a motor car across the country and making all the necessary repairs en route. Miss Blanche Stuart Scott yesterday started in an Overland automobile on a transcontinental Journey which will end in San Francisco.
- The New York Times; February 27, 1960, page 21, Woman Who Began Flying in 1910 Recalls the Day
- The New York Times; January 13, 1970, page 45, Blanche Stuart Scott, 84, Dies; Made First Solo Flight in 1910; Feat Followed Cross-Country Drive Later Toured as Daredevil Flier
