= Brancker =

Brancker is a surname. Notable people with the surname include:

- Rawle Brancker (1937–2021), West Indian cricketer
- Mary Brancker (1914–2010), English veterinary surgeon
- Sefton Brancker (1877–1930), Royal Air Force air marshal and British Army general

== See also ==
- Branker
