= Branker =

Branker is a surname. Notable people with the surname include:

- Anthony J. Branker (born 1980), Sports Chiropractor
- Anthony Branker (born 1958), American musician and educator
- Kenneth Branker (born 1932), Barbadian cricketer
- Thomas Branker (1633–1676), English mathematician

== See also ==
- Brancker
- Branger
