= Traniela Campolieto =

Argentine pilot

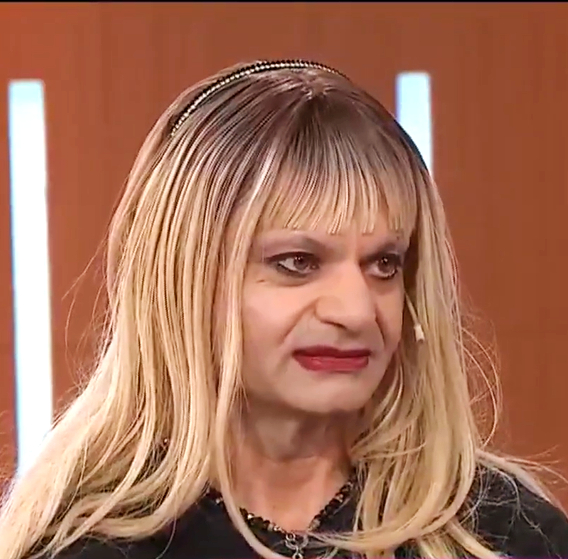
- Campolieto in a television interview, 2024.
- Other names: Traniela Carle Campolieto
- Occupations: Aircraft captain; personal trainer; fitness competitor; influencer
- Years active: c. 1991–present
- Employer: Aerolineas Argentinas
- Known for: Being the first transgender woman captain in Latin American aviation

Traniela Carle Campolieto is an Argentine pilot, known for being the first transgender woman to be an airline pilot in command in the history of Argentina and of Latin America as a whole. She has worked for national flag carrier Aerolíneas Argentinas since 1999, where she captains the Airbus A330-200, the largest aircraft in the fleet. Prior to entering commercial aviation, she dedicated herself to general and military aviation, becoming second lieutenant for the Argentine Army. Campolieto came out as transgender in 2023, at the age of 48, and on May 24 of that year she commanded her first international flight under her new legal gender, after which she gained prominence in Argentine social media as well as traditional media. In addition to her career as a pilot, Campolieto is a personal trainer and fitness competitor.

== Life and career ==
Prior to transitioning, Traniela Carle Campolieto already had a well-established, 33-year-old career in aviation under her birth name Carlos Daniel. Interviewed by La Nación, she stated that she realized she wanted to be a pilot as early as 10 years old, when she dreamed of flying a "jumbo jet", the four-engine, double-decker Boeing 747. Noting her vocation for aviation, after primary school her parents enrolled her in the National Institute of Civil Aviation (Spanish: Instituto Nacional de Aviación Civil; INAC), an aeronautical technical school that still exists in what is now the Morón Military Air Base. Later, at the age of 17, her parents enrolled her in the Escuela de Planeadores (in English: "Glider School"), located at the aerodrome of Cañuelas, Buenos Aires Province, where she was able to fly for the first time. When she reached the age of 18, she began her career as a pilot after obtaining her glider pilot's license. Near the age of 21, she moved from general aviation to military aviation as she joined the Argentine Army, where she completed a six-month military training and graduated as a second lieutenant. Then, at 23, she got the biggest break of her career when she was contacted by Aerolíneas Argentinas, the national flag carrier. The following year, in 1999, she joined the airline as a co-pilot for the Boeing 737.

Campolieto has been married for 18 years to a cisgender woman, with whom she has three daughters. In interviews, she has stated that before transitioning to a woman, she was as a bigender person from a young age—though initially unaware of the term—and lived contentedly as both a man in public and a woman in private. She has also said that before transitiong she identified as a crossdresser. As a male, she presented in a very masculine manner and even competed as a bodybuilder. Over the years, Campolieto felt that she actually perceived herself as a woman and wanted to live life publicly as such. By 2022, she decided that she should plan for a year her coming out at both the family and professional levels, fearing that she would lose both ties. In 2023, after telling her wife and then her daughters, she presented her ID card, birth certificate and passport to Aerolíneas Argentinas under her new legal gender identity. The choice of her new name, Traniela, is a deliberate reference to the word transgender. Her coming out was well received both in her private life and at the airline, where she was invited to participate in the gender secretariat of the company and the union. Under her new identity, Campolieto first flew a domestic flight to Iguazú and later, on May 24, 2023, she commanded her first international flight to Miami. This news spread through social media and traditional media and made Campolieto rise to prominence.

In the last quarter of 2024, in a context of increasing wage conflicts in the sector, together with the advance of the attempts to privatize Aerolíneas Argentinas by Javier Milei's government, several media have consulted Campolieto about her position on the matter. In response to this, Campolieto expressed strong opposition to the idea of privatization, saying that it would lead to the same dismantling of Aerolíneas Argentinas that happened after the privatization of the company in the 1990s under Carlos Menem's presidency. She also claimed that she had a plan for the company that consisted in that the "unprofitable" but necessary routes to connect the country should not be subsidized with money from the State, but from the company itself; she also proposed herself to be the new CEO of the company and expressed her desire to have a meeting with President Milei. Campolieto has gained popularity on social media, where she has more than 132,000 Instagram followers, and in October 2024 she was part of a group of 14 influencers who were in conflict with the Buenos Aires justice system for promoting illegal online gambling sites, as part of the city's fight against the growing phenomenon of underage gambling.

== See also ==
- Transgender rights in Argentina
- List of transgender people
- List of women aviators
