= Mary Calcaño =

Pioneering Venezuelan female aviator

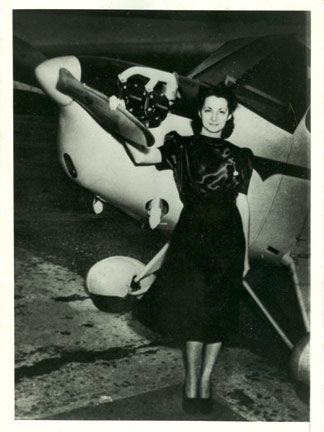
Photo of Mary Calcaño, the first female aviator of Venezuela.

María Asunción Calcaño Ruiz, usually known as Mary Calcaño or by her married name Mary Keeler (1906–1992), was the first Venezuelan woman to be granted a pilot's licence. She received licence No. 73,550 from the United States Civil Aeronautics Authority on 13 November 1939 after training at Roosevelt Field, Long Island. Shortly afterwards, on 6 December 1940, she received her Venezuelan pilot's licence.

== Biography ==
Born in Ciudad Bolívar on 15 August 1906, María Asunción Calcaño was the daughter of José Antonio Calcaño Sánchez and María Ruiz. Keen to fly from an early age, she got a job as a translator, salesperson and advertising director for John Stubbins Co., representatives of Piper planes in Caracas. She was sent to the United States by her company to train as a pilot, receiving her licence, No. 73,550 from the United States Civil Aeronautics Authority, in November 1939. On 6 December 1940, her Venezuelan Private Pilot Certificate of Aptitude was issued, signed by Colonel Isaías Medina Angarita, at the time Minister of War and Navy, and later President of Venezuela.

On 22 February 1940, Calcaño arrived at the airfield in Ciudad Bolívar, piloting her own plane on a trip from Barcelona, accompanied by her mechanic and copilot Antonio Reyes.

During World War II, she worked for the U.S. Air Force, transporting aircraft parts from the factory in Seattle to Britain. In 1941, she was the first female pilot to land at the Air Force base in Dayton, Ohio.

After the war, she bought her own plane, returned to Caracas and in 1946 founded Ala Venezolana (Venezuelan Wing), the first club for civil pilots in Venezuela. Together with five male pilots, in 1959 she founded the country's first private civil aviation school.

She later married the American Frank Keeler, had a son and was subsequently referred to as Mary Keeler. She died on 17 November 1992 in Caracas.

== See also ==
- Luisa Elena Contreras Mattera
- Ana Branger
