= Beverly Pakii =

Papua New Guinean pilot

Beverly Pakii is a pilot from Papua New Guinea (PNG). She was the first Papua New Guinean woman to be the captain of both a passenger turboprop aircraft and a passenger jet aircraft and was the captain of the first all-woman crew to fly on a commercial flight in PNG.

== Early life ==
Pakii's parents came from Enga Province and Morobe Province. Her father, Captain Ted Pakii, is a former Papua New Guinea Defence Force pilot who joined the national airline, Air Niugini, and became the captain of its Boeing 767-300ER planes before retiring. Beverly Pakii started with Air Niugini in 2004 as its first female cadet, completing her training at a flying school in Coffs Harbour, New South Wales, where Air Niugini sends its cadets for training.

== Career ==
After completing her studies, Pakii returned to Papua New Guinea in 2006 where she operated as First Officer on De Havilland Canada Dash 8 turboprop aircraft. She became the airline's first female captain in March 2015. In May 2015, she was the captain on PNG's first all-woman crew, with a female first officer and two female cabin crew, flying for Air Niugini's subsidiary, Link PNG. In 2018, she became the first woman to captain one of Air Niugini's Fokker 100 jets and also flies the Fokker 70.

On 18 November 2024, she became the first Papua New Guinean to be certified to fly an Airbus A220.
