= Mabel Virginia Rawlinson =

American World War II aviator

- Born: Mabel Virginia Rawlinson; 19 March 1917; Greenwood, Delaware
- Died: 23 August 1943 (aged 26); Camp Davis Army Airfield
- Cause of death: Plane crash
- Resting place: Michigan
- Education: Western Michigan University
- Aviation career
- First flight: 31 October 1940
- Flight license: 1941

Mabel Virginia Rawlinson (19 March 1917 – August 23, 1943) served with the Women Airforce Service Pilots (WASP) during World War II as one of 1,102 women to earn Silver Wings. When she died in an airplane crash during advanced night training, she became one of the 38 women who died while serving with the Women Airforce Service Pilots (WASP).

== Early life ==
Born in Greenwood, Delaware in 1917, Rawlinson and her family relocated to Blackstone in Nottoway County, Virginia in 1925 when she was eight years old. She enjoyed playing outside in her rural hometown, served as an active member of her church, and participated in talent shows. After graduating high school in Virginia, Rawlinson relocated to Kalamazoo, Michigan in 1935. There, she lived with her aunt, English professor Eleanor Rawlinson.

== Education ==
Rawlinson earned her Bachelor of Arts degree at Western Michigan University (WMU) in Kalamazoo. She worked at the Kalamazoo Plating Works and Kalamazoo Public Library. After she experienced her first flying lesson in 1940, Rawlinson chose to enter WMU's civilian pilot training course, which newly welcomed female students. On October 31, 1940, Rawlinson flew her first solo flight and in 1941, she earned her private pilot's license. Rawlinson spent her free time at the Kalamazoo Battle Creek International Airport as co-owner of an Aeronca Chief airplane.

== Career ==
When the United States entered World War II, Rawlinson helped organize the local Kalamazoo Civil Air Patrol. It was the civilian auxiliary of, what was at the time, the United States Army Air Forces (today the United States Air Force). By the fall of 1942, when Rawlinson learned of the opportunities for women to help ferry aircraft, tow targets for ground troop practice, and train pilots, she chose to put her flying skills to use in the war effort by applying for what became the Women Airforce Service Pilots. These volunteer pilots flew 77 airplane types and logged 60 million miles during the program's run.

Rawlinson travelled to Avenger Field in Sweetwater, Texas for her WASP training, which began January 16, 1943. A letter home during WASP training reveals her passion for flying: "The class ahead of us is having night flying now. It must be beautiful up there these nights, the moon is shining." After completing basic training and with distinguished guest, WASP director Jacqueline Cochran in attendance, Rawlinson graduated WASP Class 43-W-3 on July 3, 1943. Following graduation, she wrote home about her trip to visit the Alamo and San Antonio, Texas before reporting for an advanced training assignment at Camp Davis Army Airfield in North Carolina.

== Death ==
Rawlinson's last flight claimed her life only two months after she arrived at Camp Davis. On the night of August 23, 1943, when she discovered that her friend, Marion Hanrahan had not yet eaten her dinner, Rawlinson volunteered to take Hanrahan's place on the night flight schedule. While Hanrahan ate in the camp dining room, Rawlinson boarded an A-24 Banshee, the land-based variant of the Douglas SBD Dauntless. She executed an effective takeoff and flight. However, upon its landing, the A-24 stalled after cutting across a row of trees. Rawlinson's instructor, 2nd Lt. Harvey J. Robillard, urged Rawlinson to jump for her life. The lieutenant made a crash landing and although the aircraft broke apart upon impact, Robillard survived with serious injuries. Rawlinson did not jump, potentially due to a faulty cockpit escape latch. She lost her life to the aircraft's blaze while still belted into the cockpit. When Hanrahan and others in the dining room heard a siren, they rushed out onto the field to investigate. They saw the crashed A-24 and 26-year-old Rawlinson, who could be heard screaming, consumed by flames. An eyewitness to the crash, friend and fellow WASP Dora Dougherty Strother, described Rawlinson's loss as a "very traumatic time for all of us here...this was the first time I had seen a friend die so it was a trauma for me and I think for all of us." A serious accident and another death further crushed morale at Camp Davis. Some WASP considered resignation until Jacqueline Cochran intervened to stop the vulnerable program from unraveling.

== Legacy ==
Because they perceived the WASP as civilian volunteers and not Air Force pilots, the U.S. military made no financial resources available to send fallen WASPs home or for funeral costs. So, in an act of kindness customary to the WASP, Rawlinson's fellow Camp Davis classmates took up a collection to send Rawlinson's body and belongings home to Michigan. Members of her unit accompanied her body home. Rawlinson's family wished to drape the American flag over her coffin. However, in 1943, the military limited this honor to official armed services members only. Despite this regulation, Rawlinson's family honored their WASP with a well-attended funeral procession with a flag-draped casket. The Kalamazoo Civil Air Patrol, which she helped establish before her WASP career, commemorated Rawlinson with a traditional flyover as well as bugle and gun salutes.
