= Beverly Burns =

American aviator (1949–2025)

Beverly Lynn Burns
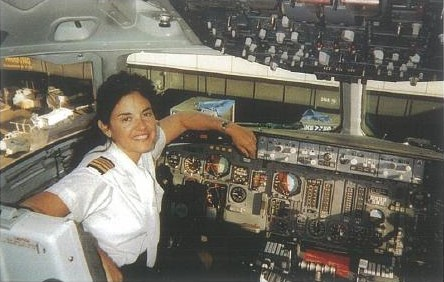
- Burns in 1993
- Born: August 15, 1949; Baltimore, Maryland, U.S.
- Died: November 1, 2025 (aged 76); Baltimore, Maryland, U.S.
- Occupation: Continental Airlines captain
- Known for: First woman in the world to captain the Boeing 747 jumbo jet
- Spouse(s): Captain Robert Allen Burns, Flight Instructor of Year, 1972

Beverly Lynn Burns (August 15, 1949 – November 1, 2025) was the first woman to captain the Boeing 747 jumbo jet. On the afternoon of July 18, 1984, Burns made her maiden voyage as a captain when she commanded People Express aircraft 604 from Newark International Airport to Los Angeles International Airport.

By the time she retired, in February 2008, Burns had been a captain with the airlines for twenty-seven years and amassed over twenty-five thousand hours of flight time. While with People Express she captained the Boeing 727, Boeing 737 and Boeing 747. Between 1987, when the company merged with Continental Airlines, and 2000, she added the DC-9, DC-10, Boeing 757 and Boeing 767 to the list of jetliners she had captained. Then, in May 2001, Burns became captain on one of the most technologically sophisticated airliners of its time, the Boeing 777.

In addition to her qualifications on the flight deck, Burns had acquired an understanding of the airlines as a business. From 1971 to 1978, she worked as a stewardess for American Airlines while attending flight school. In 1978, she held positions as a flight instructor and charter pilot for Hinson Airways. The following year, she flew as captain for Allegheny Commuter until 1981, when she went to work for People Express.

While with People Express, Burns had a number of non-traditional duties. She worked in reservations; in scheduling; and as a gate agent, baggage handler, and avionics trainer. Varying the duties of pilots—an operating approach novel to the industry in the early 1980s—required the company's CEO to obtain special FAA authorization, an action that facilitated a number of firsts in the industry. For Burns it meant becoming the first woman to ever work as a certified aircraft dispatcher while performing duties as a line captain.

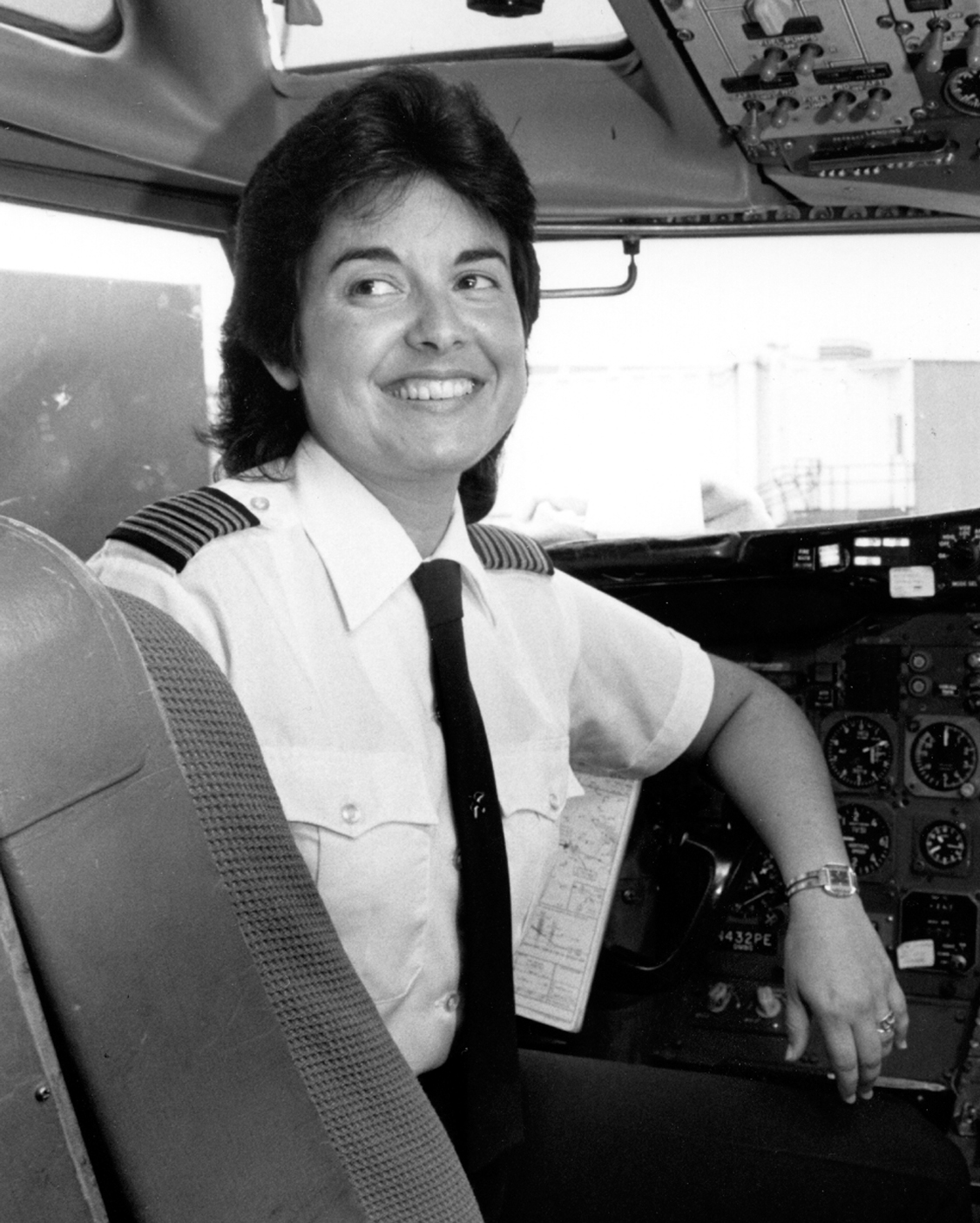
Beverly Burns, the first woman to captain the Boeing 747 airliner, here in July 1985.

Captain Burns received numerous awards and commendations. On January 31, 1985, she received the Amelia Earhart Award—presented by New Jersey Governor Thomas Kean and the CEO of People Express, Donald Burr—for her historic flight as captain of the Boeing 747 on July 18, 1984. Prior to that award, on August 14, 1984, she received an Award of Recognition from Baltimore Mayor William Donald Schaefer, which cited her as one of Baltimore's best. On August 16, she received a letter of congratulation from New Jersey Senator C. Louis Bassano, who prepared a resolution in her honor. On August 21, U.S. Senator Frank R. Lautenberg of New Jersey credited her with "opening doors for millions of American women" and read her deeds into the Congressional Record. On October 17, Maryland Governor Harry Hughes sent a letter of congratulation and named her an "ambassador of goodwill" for the state. On November 16, she received a letter of congratulation from President Ronald Reagan and was invited to the 50th American President Inauguration.

Later commendations included a 2001 citation from U.S. Senator Barbara Mikulski of Maryland and a letter of congratulation, dated August 7, 2001, from President George W. Bush. On February 6, 2002, a proclamation by Baltimore Mayor Martin O'Malley designated the date as Beverly Burns Day in Baltimore. In 2003, she received a Certificate of Appreciation from USAF General John W. Handy for outstanding support for Operation Iraqi Freedom while serving as a member of the Civil Reserve Air Fleet.

She has a autobiography called The Shadow Of Thy Wings.

Burns later suffered from Alzheimer's disease, and died in Baltimore on November 1, 2025, at the age of 76. She was predeceased by her husband.
