= Olga Lisikova =

Soviet transport pilot

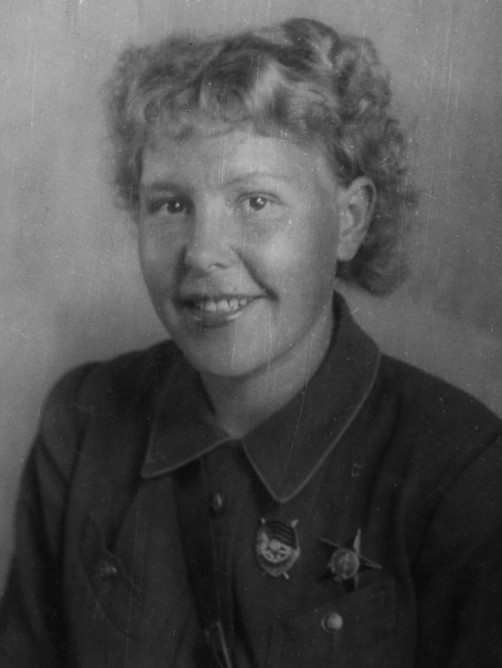
- Native name: Ольга Михайловна Лисикова
- Born: 7 November 1916; Vladivostok, Russian Empire
- Died: 7 September 2011 (aged 94) Saint Petersburg, Russia
- Allegiance: Soviet Union
- Branch: Soviet Air Force
- Service years: 1941–1945
- Rank: Senior lieutenant
- Conflicts: World War II; Winter War; Eastern Front
- Awards: Order of Red Banner

Olga Mikhailovna Lisikova née Vlasova (Russian: Ольга Михайловна Лисикова; 7 November 1916 – 7 September 2011) was a Soviet transport pilot and the only woman in the Soviet Air Force to become pilot-in-command of a C-47.

== Early life ==
Born to a Russian family on 7 November 1916 in the Vladivostok area, she and her family relocated to Leningrad where she attended school. Her father was a teacher, stepfather a secretary in a district party committee, and her mother who was originally a housewife later became a restaurant worker. After graduating from secondary school attended trade school and became a foreman at a local factory. In 1934 she entered the Tambov civil aviation school, and in 1936 she and the other female students at the Balashov and Tambov flight schools were transferred to the Bataysk Flight School to form a women's squadron; there she piloted the Po-2 and R-5 aircraft. Having graduated from the school in 1937, she became a pilot for Aeroflot and was assigned to the difficult Moscow-Leningrad route despite her inexperience. Nevertheless, she mastered the route, flying solo in small aircraft and later as co-pilot in a K-5 with her future husband Vasily Lisikov. Later she became one of the few women pilots in the Winter War, flying missions to evacuate wounded and frostbitten soldiers from the front, all while pregnant with her first child.

== World War II ==
At the time of the German invasion of the Soviet Union, Lisikova was a new mother; nevertheless, she was immediately drafted into active duty pilot SP-2 (a modified Po-2) air ambulance to evacuate wounded soldiers. During one of her flights in the early days of the war, her plane carrying two wounded soldiers was pursued by a Bf 109, forcing her to conduct evasive maneuvers, even though it was clearly marked as a medical plane with a red cross painted on it. For successfully diving to evade the attacking fighter and saving her passengers while causing the Bf 109 to crash in a dive she was awarded the Order of the Red Banner.

Later she was sent to be retrained to fly the Lisunov Li-2 and C-47; As an experienced pilot with over 1600 flying hours at the time, she loved the aircraft, which were far larger and more advanced than other aircraft she had flown previously. Despite only brief training and one check flight she quickly mastered flying the complex aircraft, which required a crew of six people (a pilot, co-pilot, navigator, tail gunner, mechanic, and radio operator), and received a promotion to become pilot-in-command; several days after the order for her promotion was made it was temporarily throttled by the division commander's attempts to assign her to ferrying aircraft purchased from the United States across Siberia in order to get rid the only woman pilot in his division, but eventually she received the promotion and began flying sorties as pilot-in-command of the Li-2 and later the slightly different C-47. Her missions included deploying paratroopers, dropping aid to besieged Leningrad, and dropping supplies to partisans. Throughout the war she totaled around 408 sorties, 280 of them on the Li-2 and C-47 heavy cargo transports. Although she received relatively few high awards in comparison to her high number of sorties, she was frequently featured in wartime media, with her picture and descriptions of her feats printed in leaflets as well as newspapers and magazines including Ogonyok. (Note: The exact reason for her receiving relatively few high orders relative to her number of sorties is disputed; some sources indicate that her husband’s status as a missing person and the government’s treatment of family members of such persons was a factor, while Lisikova indicated it was due to an officer in the division staff halting her award nominations because she was a woman in a male division)

== Postwar ==
Due to her poor health from flying at high altitudes without a supplemental oxygen mask, she was forced to quit flying altogether in 1946, after only briefly returning to Aeroflot and taking on several routes out of Leningrad.

Due to mistakenly believing that her first husband Vasily Lisikov was dead after his plane was downed and exploded, she remarried and settled down with her new family. However, her previous husband had actually survived the war, having been captured by the Germans when badly wounded and subsequently imprisoned in a POW camp and then an NKVD camp for former prisoners of war before eventually being released in 1946.

She lived out her later years in a house for war veterans in Pavlovsk, Saint Petersburg before she died on 7 September 2011.

== Awards ==
- Order of the Red Banner (1942)
- Order of the Patriotic War 2nd class (1985)
- Order of the Red Star (1943)
- Medal "For Battle Merit" (1944)
- campaign and jubilee medals
