= Wang Zheng (pilot) =

Asian woman who flew solo around the world

- 王争
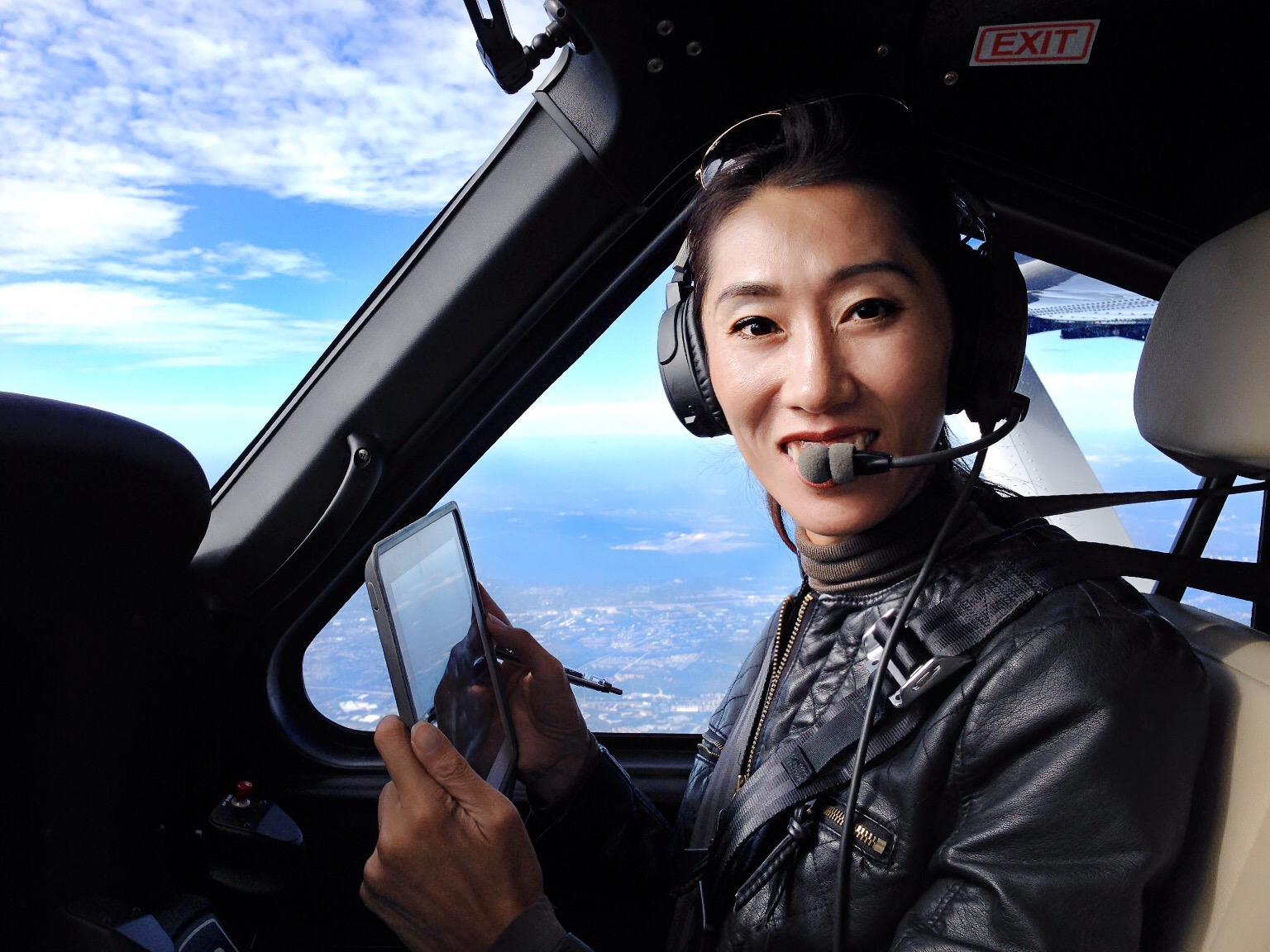
- Wang Zheng
- Born: December 25, 1972 (age 53); Chongqing, China
- Known for: First Asian woman to fly around the world; first Chinese pilot to solo fly around the world.
- Aviation career
- First flight: March 10, 2011
- Famous flights: Solo Global Circumnavigation August 17 – September 19, 2016
- Other name: Julie Wang
- Occupation: Airline Captain

Wang Zheng (王争; born 25 December 1972), also known as Julie Wang, is an airline pilot and an FAA Certified Flight Instructor (CFI) in the United States, where she resides. She is the first Asian woman to circumnavigate Earth in an airplane. Wang is also the first Chinese pilot to fly solo around the world and the eighth woman to do so.

== Early life and education ==
Wang grew up in Harbin, China. Her parents were professors involved in aerospace research.

Wang attended college at Xiamen University and then spent fifteen years as a global advertising executive, before deciding to leave China with the goal of becoming a pilot. Wang relocated to the United States with her husband and daughter in September 2010, and received her pilot's license in 2011. Afterward, she received certification as a fight instructor, and opened a flight school in Florida.

== Global circumnavigation ==
In September 2016, Wang completed a solo circumnavigation of the globe in an airplane, becoming the first Chinese person to fly an airplane solo around the world. She departed westbound from Addison, Texas on August 17, 2016, and paused in California to have ferry tanks installed and obtain FAA approvals for the aircraft modifications. She departed from Merced, California on September 2, 2016, and made stops in Hawaii, the Marshall Islands, Guam, the Philippines, China, Thailand, India, the United Arab Emirates, Greece, Malta, Portugal, the Azores and Newfoundland, before returning to Texas on September 19, thirty-three days later.

Wang made the flight in a Cirrus SR22 modified to hold extra fuel, and covered over 38,500 miles (33,500 nautical miles) in 155 flying hours (over eighteen flight days) flying over or landing in 24 countries. Her longest leg was from Merced, California to Honolulu, Hawaii, covering 2,160 nautical miles in 13.8 hours. Her longest day involved the legs from Lisbon, Portugal to Santa Maria Island in the Azores, and then from Santa Maria to St. John's, Newfoundland, which required her to remain awake for 29 hours.

On November 1, 2016, at Airshow China 2016 in Zhuhai, after the information of the flight was vetted and approved by representatives of Aircraft Owners and Pilots Association (AOPA) in China, AOPA China's President, Zhang Feng, presented Wang with a replica bank draft for 1,000,000 Yuan Renminbi (about $150,000).

In April 2020, AOPA China changed their previous position, announced to withdraw such decision and will not deliver the cash award to Zheng Wang.

On November 7, 2016, Wang was presented the key to the City of West Palm Beach by Mayor Jerrie Muoio and the Commissioners of the City of West Palm Beach.

In January 2018, Wang was a featured speaker at the Sebring Sport Aviation Expo where she addressed an audience at the Expo's Young Aviator's Zone (YAZ) on "Inspiring Young Women and Aviators to Achieve their Dreams."

In March 2018, London-based Netflights honored Wang with a spot on its list of the "Top 10 Inspiring Women in Aviation of All Time."

In August 2018, Wang was included on Travel Daily Media's list of "12 Iconic Women in Aviation," celebrating National Aviation Day in the United States.

== Lawsuits ==
In 2014, Chen Wei, a Chinese businessman who had himself circumnavigated the world, put up a prize of 1 million Chinese yuan for the first Chinese woman to fly an airplane around the world. In August 2016 another female Chinese pilot, Jingxian Chen, was reported to be part way through completing the journey, aiming to win the prize. Jingxian Chen, claimed to have completed her flight first and filed a lawsuit against Wang in Beijing, China. Wang's legal representative made a statement saying Jingxian Chen had made false claims.

In March 2018, Wang filed a lawsuit against Chen Wei, the prize founder, for failure to pay her the cash prize he had already awarded her fifteen months earlier at the Zhuhai Airshow. Chen Wei denied the allegations of the complaint. Wang's lawsuit against Chen was dismissed by court.

In 2018, Wang filed a lawsuit in New York County Supreme Court against the Ninety-Nines, a female aviators' organization, saying that they had falsely represented to the public that Jingxian Chen was the first Asian woman to circumnavigate the globe solo, while having two male pilots on board, and finishing her flight ten days after Wang's was completed.

In 2019, Jingxian "Saki" Chen filed a lawsuit against Wang's husband (and lawyer), accusing him of "fraudulently rewriting history". She claimed that she, not Wang, was the first Chinese woman to fly around the globe alone. Her complaint was dismissed in 2023, and in 2025, Wang was awarded $7.3 million in damages from a defamation suit.
