= Luisa Elena Contreras Mattera =

Pioneering Venezuelan female aviator

Luisa Elena Contreras Mattera (1922–2006) was a Venezuelan aircraft pilot. On 1 July 1943, she received her pilot's license from the Escuela de Aviación Civil Miguel Rodríguez. She became the first woman to complete a solo flight in Venezuela.

== See also ==
- Ana Branger
