= Bessie Raiche =

American physician and aviator (1875–1932)

Bessica Faith Raiche
- Born: April 1875 near Beloit, Wisconsin
- Died: April 11, 1932 (aged 56–57); Balboa Island, Newport Beach, California
- Occupations: dentist, physician
- Spouse: François "Frank" C. Raiche
- Children: Catherine E. Raiche
- Parent(s): Elizabeth and James B. Medlar

Bessica Faith Raiche née Medlar, known as Bessie Raiche, (April 1875 – 11 April 1932) was an American dentist, physician, and America's first female aviator.

Raiche was the first woman in the United States accredited with flying solo in an airplane.

== Biography ==
Bessie Faith Medlar was born in April 1875 in Beloit, Wisconsin. Her mother, Elizabeth, was from New Hampshire, and her father, James B. Medlar, was from New York. She had a sister: Alice Maude Medlar (1879-?). In 1880 the family was living in Rockford, Illinois, and she was using the name "Bessie F. Medler".

Raiche was a proto-feminist: she drove an automobile and wore bloomers. She was also a musician, painter, and linguist, and participated in swimming and shooting. In 1900 she was working as a dentist and living in New Hampton, New Hampshire, renting a room under the name Faith Medlar. In the 1910 Census, Bessie Faith, her widowed mother Elizabeth, and her sister Alice Maude Medlar were living in Swampscott, Massachusetts. According to the 1910 Census, Bessie was a physician and Alice was a vocal (music) teacher. Bessie married François "Frank" C. Raiche (1874-?) of New Hampshire and they moved to Mineola, New York. Frank's parents were both from France.

She and her husband built a Wright-type biplane in their living room and then assembled it in their yard. The Raiches constructed their flyer from bamboo and silk instead of a heavier canvas covering used by the Wright brothers. On September 16, 1910, in her homemade flyer at Hempstead Plains, New York, Raiche made the first solo airplane flight by a woman in the United States to be accredited by the Aeronautical Society of America. It would be another year before Harriet Quimby became the first American woman to earn her pilot's license.

On October 13, 1910, Raiche was awarded a diamond-studded gold medal inscribed "First Woman Aviator in America" by Hudson Maxim of the Aeronautical Society of America at a dinner the society held in her honor.

Raiche and her husband went on to build two more airplanes as part of the French-American Aeroplane Company. They were innovators in the use of lighter weight materials in aircraft construction, including the use of piano wire to replace heavier iron wire.

In 1915 the Raiches had a daughter: Catherine E. Raiche (1915-1995). In 1920 the Raiches were living in Newport Beach, California. Bessica was a physician, one of the first women specialists in obstetrics and gynecology in the United States, and Frank was practicing as a lawyer. In 1923 Bessica served as president of the Orange County Medical Association. In 1930 she was living in Santa Ana, California.

On April 11, 1932, Raiche died in her sleep in Balboa Island, Newport Beach, California, of a heart attack.
