= Ana Branger =

Pioneering Venezuelan female aviator

Ana Luisa de San José Branger Mordaing Long (17 June 1918 – ) was a pioneering female aviator from Venezuela.

Branger was born in Valencia, Venezuela to Rafael Enrique Branger Párraga and a French mother, Madeleine Louise Eugénie Mordaing.

She received her license in 1942 after training at the Escuela de Aviación Miguel Rodríguez in Maracay. In November 1939, Mary Calcaño had in fact become the first Venezuelan to be granted a pilot's license, although she had received it from the United States authorities after training in Long Island, New York.

Branger was the first woman to graduate from Michel Rodriguez, the country's only pilot training school in the 1940s. Shortly after receiving her license, she joined the Centro de Instrucción de Aeronáutica Civil at the La Carlota air base. She flew not only in Venezuela but also in Peru and in the United States where she broke two world records.

In 1950, she broke the record for light-plane high altitude flying, reaching a height of 24,504 feet in a Cub Special with a Continental C-90-8F 90 hp engine, substantially higher than the 18,999 feet achieved by Elizabeth Boselli. The following year, she again broke the record for high altitude when she flew at 28,820 feet, breaking René Leduc's record of 25,000 feet. Both these achievements were covered by the international press.

Branger is also remembered for her post as cultural attaché at Venezuela's embassy in Washington, D.C.

In 1946, she married American John Aubrey Long in Rio de Janeiro.

== See also ==
- Luisa Elena Contreras Mattera
