= Women in Aviation International Pioneer Hall of Fame =

The Women in Aviation International Pioneer Hall of Fame (Also WAI Pioneer Hall of Fame) was established in 1992 by Women in Aviation International to honor and recognize women who have made significant contributions to aviation. Its purpose is to honor women who have made significant contributions as record setters, pioneers, or innovators in the aviation and aerospace industries. WAI solicits nominations from throughout the aviation industry each year for the WAI Pioneer Hall of Fame. Inductees are chosen from the nominations by a committee, "with special consideration given to individuals who have helped other women become successful in aviation or opened doors of opportunity for other women." Women are inducted to the hall of fame at the conclusion of the WAI annual conference.

Pioneer Hall of Fame Inductees
Name	Image	Birth–Death	Year
Sandra L. Anderson			2005
Anne Bridge Baddour			2005
Mary Barr		(1925–2010)	2001
Colleen Barrett		(1944–2024)	2005
Trish Beckman			2010
Olive Ann Beech		(1903–1993)	1994
Fran Bera		(1924–2018)	2006
Nancy Bird		(1915–2009)	2023
Rosella Bjornson		(1947–)	2004
Priscilla Blum			2015
Karen Fuller Brannen			2013
Deanna Brasseur		(1953–)	2007
Bonnie Tiburzi Caputo		(1948–)	2018
Ann Baumgartner Carl		(1918–2008)	2001
Leanne Caret		(1966–)	2019
Peggy Chabrian			2011
Katherine Cheung		(1904–2003)	2000
Julie E. Clark		(1948–)	2002
Jerrie Cobb		(1931–2019)	2000
Jacqueline Cochran		(1906–1980)	2009
Bessie Coleman		(1892–1926)	1995
Eileen Collins		(1956–)	1995
Ann Lewis Cooper		(1934–2020)	2004
Vivien Crea		(1952–)	2010
Iris Cummings Critchell		(1920–)	2007
Nancy J. Currie		(1958–)	2014
Suzanna Darcy-Henneman		(1956–)	2010
Fiorenza De Bernardi		(1928–2020)	2002
Lorna deBlicquy		(1931–2009)	1996
Tammy Duckworth		(1968–)	2011
Amelia Earhart		(1897–1937)	1997
Arlene Elliott		(1918–2010)	1999
Mary Feik		(1924–2016)	1994
Arlene B. Feldman			2004
First Women of U.S. Coast Guard Aviation			2019
First Class of Women Naval Aviators			2017
First Women's National Air Derby Pilots			2012
Cornelia Clark Fort		(1919–1943)	2022
Kathleen Fox		(1951–)	2018
Wally Funk		(1939–)	1995
Elizabeth "Betty" Everts Greene		(1920–1997)	2017
Stayce Harris		(1959–)	2017
Bernice Falk Haydu		(1920–2021)	2012
Gloria Heath		(1922–2017)	1999
Susan J. Helms		(1958–)	2011
Jeanne Holm		(1921–2010)	2006
Nancy Hopkins		(1909–1997)	1993
Jean Ross Howard		(1916–2004)	1995
Marion P. Jayne		(1926–1996)	2000
Nadine Jeppesen		(1914–1996)	1995
Amy Johnson		(1903–1941)	2016
Evelyn Bryan Johnson		(1909–2012)	1994
Loretta Jones			1998
Martha King			2023
Galina Gavrilovna Korchuganova		(1935–2004)	2006
Moya Lear		(1915–2001)	1992
Jeannie Leavitt		(1967–)	2020
Hazel Ying Lee		(1912–1944)	2011
Nelda Lee			2004
Dorothy Swain Lewis		(1915–2013)	2004
Anne Morrow Lindbergh		(1905–2001)	1999
Doris Lockness		(1910–2017)	2002
Barbara Erickson London		(1920–2013)	2005
Nancy Harkness Love		(1914–1976)	2008
Elizabeth MacGill		(1905–1980)	2012
Mary Magdalene Maga			2012
Nicole Malachowski		(1974–)	2008
Patricia W. Malone		(1924–2008)	2009
Rosemary Bryant Mariner		(1953–2019)	2022
Beryl Markham		(1902–1986)	2014
Marie Marvingt		(1875–1963)	2007
June Maule		(1917–2009)	1999
Linda K. McTague		(1957–2017)	2018
Mercury 13 'The Fellow Lady Astronaut Trainees' (FLATS)			1996
Alice du Pont Mills		(1912–2002)	2010
Jerrie Mock		(1925–2014)	2008
Betty Mullis			2006
Navy Women Navigators of WWII (WAVES)			1997
Ruth Nichols		(1901–1960)	2009
Phoebe Omlie		(1902–1975)	2015
Deanie Parrish		(1922–2022)	2015
Nancy Parrish			2015
Betty Haas Pfister		(1921–2011)	2001
Peggy A. Phillips			2022
Audrey Poberezny		(1925–2020)	1996
Harriet Quimby		(1875–1912)	1998
Sally Ride		(1951–2012)	2014
Margaret Ringenberg		(1921–2008)	2008
Brenda E. Robinson		(1956–)	2016
Joan Robinson-Berry			2021
Mary Golda Ross		(1908–2008)	2019
Blanche Stuart Scott		(1885–1970)	2002
Sheila Scott		(1922–1988)	2014
Dawn Seymour		(1917–2017)	2009
Mary Frances Silitch		(1935–)	2013
Betty Skelton Frankman		(1926–2011)	1997
Elinor Smith		(1911–2010)	2001
Jacqueline L. Smith			1998
Kathryn D. Sullivan		(1951–)	2010
Merryl Tengesdal		(1971–)	2023
Louise McPhetridge Thaden		(1905–1979)	2000
Carol Timmons		(1958–2020)	2021
Anna Timofeyeva-Yegorova		(1916–2009)	2009
Bobbi Trout		(1906–2003)	1993
UPT Class 77-08			2016
U.S. Army's First Women Rotary Wing Aviators			2020
U.S. Marine Corps' First Class of Women Aviators			2021
WAI Founding Board of Directors			2013
Patty Jean Wagner			2020
Patty Wagstaff		(1951–)	1997
Emily Howell Warner		(1939–)	1992
Florene Miller Watson		(1920–2014)	2005
Fay Gillis Wells		(1908–2012)	1992
Whirly-Girls, International Women Helicopter Pilots			1998
Edna Gardner Whyte		(1902–1992)	1992
Sheila Widnall		(1938–)	1996
Betty Jane Williams		(1919–2008)	2006
Janet C. Wolfenbarger		(1958–)	2016
Women Airforce Service Pilots (WASP)			1993
Women's Section of the Air Transport Auxiliary			2008
Jessie E. Woods		(1909–2001)	1994
Mary Anna Martin Wyall		(1922–2017)	2011
Jeana Yeager		(1952–)	1992

== See also ==
- North American aviation halls of fame
