= Trish Beckman =

American naval pilot

Patricia L. "Trish" Beckman is an American retired naval pilot, one of only five since World War II to be selected as a Naval Flight Officer.

== Early life ==
Patricia L. "Trish" Beckman was born in Huntsville, Alabama, to William and Betty Beckman, and was the oldest of seven children; Beckman's father was a Korean War veteran in the Army. She was raised in Alabama until she graduated from Lee High School in 1970. Her early interest in aviation was partially because the Saturn V rocket was partly built in Huntsville during the space race with the Soviet Union. After graduating high school, Beckman enlisted in the United States Navy.

== Military career ==
=== Early enlistment ===
Beckman enlisted in the US Navy in 1970 during the Vietnam War era. During her first eight years of enlistment, she maintained and operated flight simulators and gained higher education while serving under the Naval Enlisted Scientific Education Program. She earned a bachelor's degree in aerospace engineering from 1974 to 1978 at North Carolina State University and a master's degree in aeronautical engineering in 1988 from the Naval Postgraduate School. She was involved in NORAD (North American Aerospace Defense Command) from 1978 to 1981 as a fleet support and liaison officer in Dahlgren, Virginia.

=== Pilot ===
In 1980, Beckman became one of only five women since World War II to be selected as a Naval Flight Officer, and in 1982 earned her wings as a pilot. She is a part of the first batch of women to graduate from the US Naval Test Pilot School and later became an instructor at the academy. She is the first-ever American woman to qualify to crew the F-15E and its variants and the first to qualify to crew the F/A-18 and its variants. In her military career, Beckman piloted 67 different types of aircraft and in 1999 retired as a commander, serving 28 years.

Her service in the Navy during the Vietnam War and the complex public perceptions of veterans who served during that period of US history have stuck with Beckman during her career and retirement. Beckman believes that veterans are treated with more respect now than some of her fellow veterans received when returning from the war.

In 1991, Beckman participated in an effort to lobby the US Congress in favor of repealing exclusionary laws that prevented women from partaking in combat roles in the military. She is credited as being a part of that successful effort.

== Time at Boeing ==
After she retired from the Navy in 1999, Beckman continued her education by earning a second master's degree in business administration at Webster University in 2002. That same year she became certified by the Federal Aviation Administration as a flight navigator and aircraft dispatcher.

Beckman was then employed by Boeing as a test pilot for their civilian aircraft program and flew as a systems operator for production and engineering test flights for the Boeing 737. She also functioned as a flight test navigator for ferry flights and engineered test flights for most Boeing aircraft (737, 747, 757, 767, 777, 787), clocking in over 6000 hours of flight time for 73 different types of aircraft.

In 2013 she became a contributor to support Boeing Test & Evaluation at Edwards Air Force Base for military aircraft.

== Impact ==
Beckman has contributed to and founded various organizations whose mission is to celebrate, educate, and empower women in the aviation industry. She was the president of Women Military Aviators Inc. (WMA), a founding board member of Women in Aviation International (WAI), and inducted into the Pioneer Hall of Fame in 2010.

Beckman now resides in Seattle, Washington. She uses her life story to inspire and motivate young people to pursue a career in STEM and aviation. Trish is a workshop presenter for the Sally Ride Science Festivals in various places around the US and a contributor to several aerospace museums.
