= Mary Barr =

First female aviator to join the US Forest Service

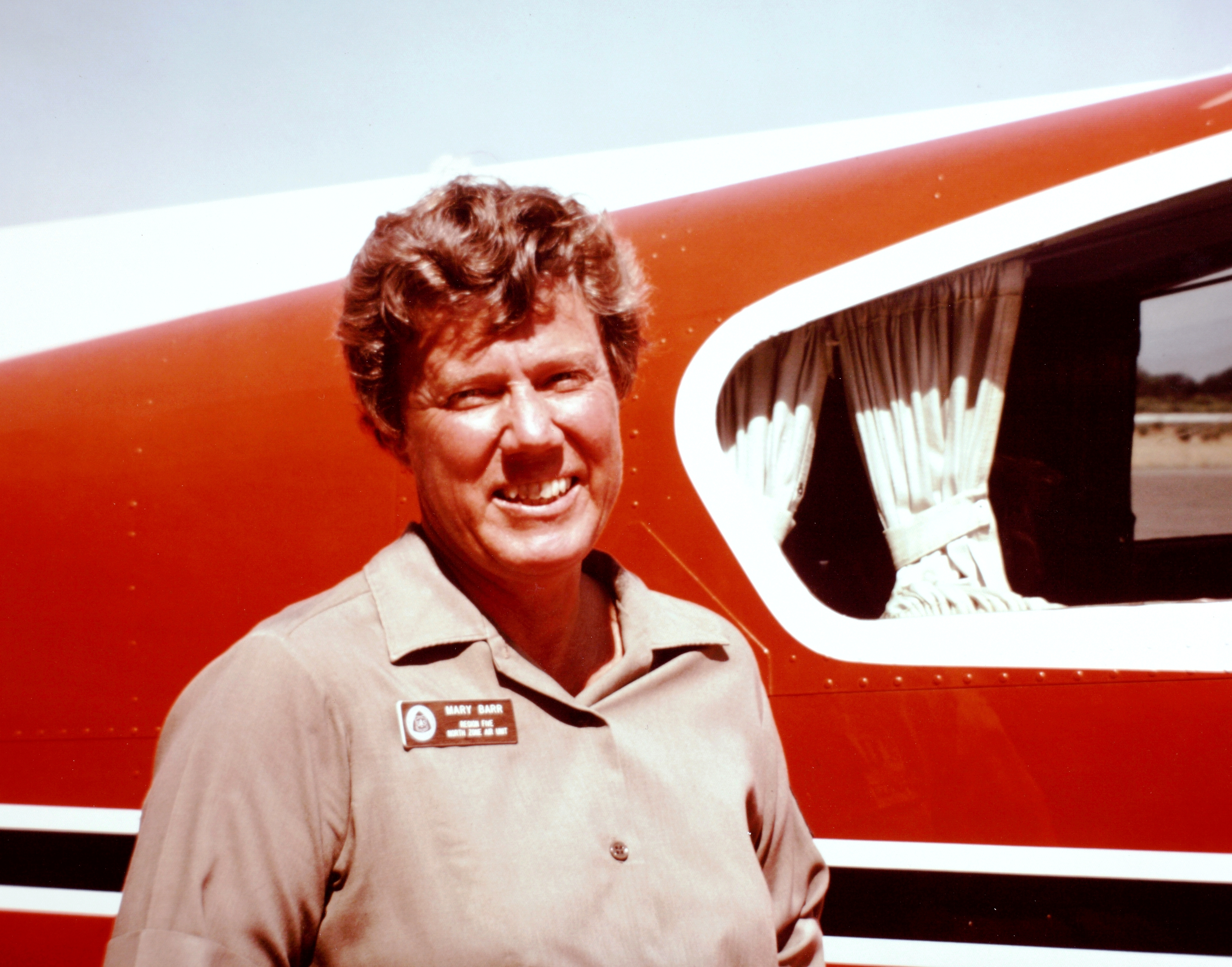
- Mary Barr next to her transport plane, 1975
- Born: July 11, 1925; United States
- Died: March 1, 2010 (aged 84); United States
- Occupations: Aviator, safety officer, mechanic, flight instructor

Mary Barr (July 11, 1925 – March 1, 2010) was the first female aviator to join the US Forest Service, along with being an accident prevention counselor, mechanic in a variety of fields, and flight instructor throughout her lifetime.

== Career ==
While living in Lorain, Ohio, and working in a factory, Barr first learned how to fly aircraft in 1946 as part of a Piper club. She had dropped out of Oberlin College the year before in order to find a job to pay for flying lessons. After completing her training, she obtained a job training others to be commercial pilots. During the end years of World War II, she decided to help build aircraft for the war, which led to her moving to New York City and joining an aircraft mechanic school. This also involved acting alongside members of the Women Airforce Service Pilots to assist in transporting war goods and planes across the US. The end of the war resulted in the Barrs moving to Susanville, California, in 1949, and setting about running and improving the Susanville airport. After obtaining her certification in 1957, she was given the position of FAA Pilot Examiner for Lassen County.

She still continued to serve as a fire response pilot in the following years, being a member of the "Air Attack Program" for Susanville in 1959 alongside her husband. In 1964, Barr became one of the first four women to ever be a part of the Reno Air Races. She placed second in the Reno National Championships in the Stock Plane Class using a Piper Cherokee. She was given the position of a Federal Aviation Administration (FAA) accident prevention counselor in 1971 thanks to her past FAA certificates in not only piloting, but also instruction. This job was a part of a new program for the FAA that involved Barr counseling pilots alongside 19 other experienced instructors spread across five states in the western US to help reduce the risk-taking activities of new or long inactive pilots throughout the region.

Beginning a career in the US Forest Service in July 1974, she became the first female pilot to do so, being promoted to official staff after having worked with the Forest Service as a contract pilot for several years. Her job entailed working as a lead plane pilot for the California North Zone Air Unit. Later in the 1970s, Barr moved to San Francisco to be an Aviation Safety Officer for the Forest Service, then becoming a National Aviation Safety Officer in Washington D. C., and finally moving to Sacramento, California, in 1985 to act as Regional Safety Officer until her eventual retirement.

During her lifetime, Barr received a number of FAA certifications, including for "Commercial, Airline Transport Pilot, Flight Instructor, Instrument, and Glider".

== Awards and honors ==
In 1988, Barr was given a special recognition award by the Lassen Experimental Aviation Association (LEAA) for her years of service in helping pilots and using the Susanville airport to relay weather information to the public. Given the "Cooperator of the Year" award in 1993 by the Honey Lake Valley Resource Conservation District, she was noted for her efforts in improving irrigation and building stabilization structures for rivers and streambanks in the region. She was named as a member of the 2001 Women in Aviation International Pioneer Hall of Fame by Women in Aviation, International and directly honored by the Smithsonian National Air and Space Museum.

== Personal life ==
Barr met her husband and boss at the time, David Barr, while teaching piloting in 1946. They married the next year and had two children, Molly and Nevada.

== Gallery ==
Photos of Mary Barr

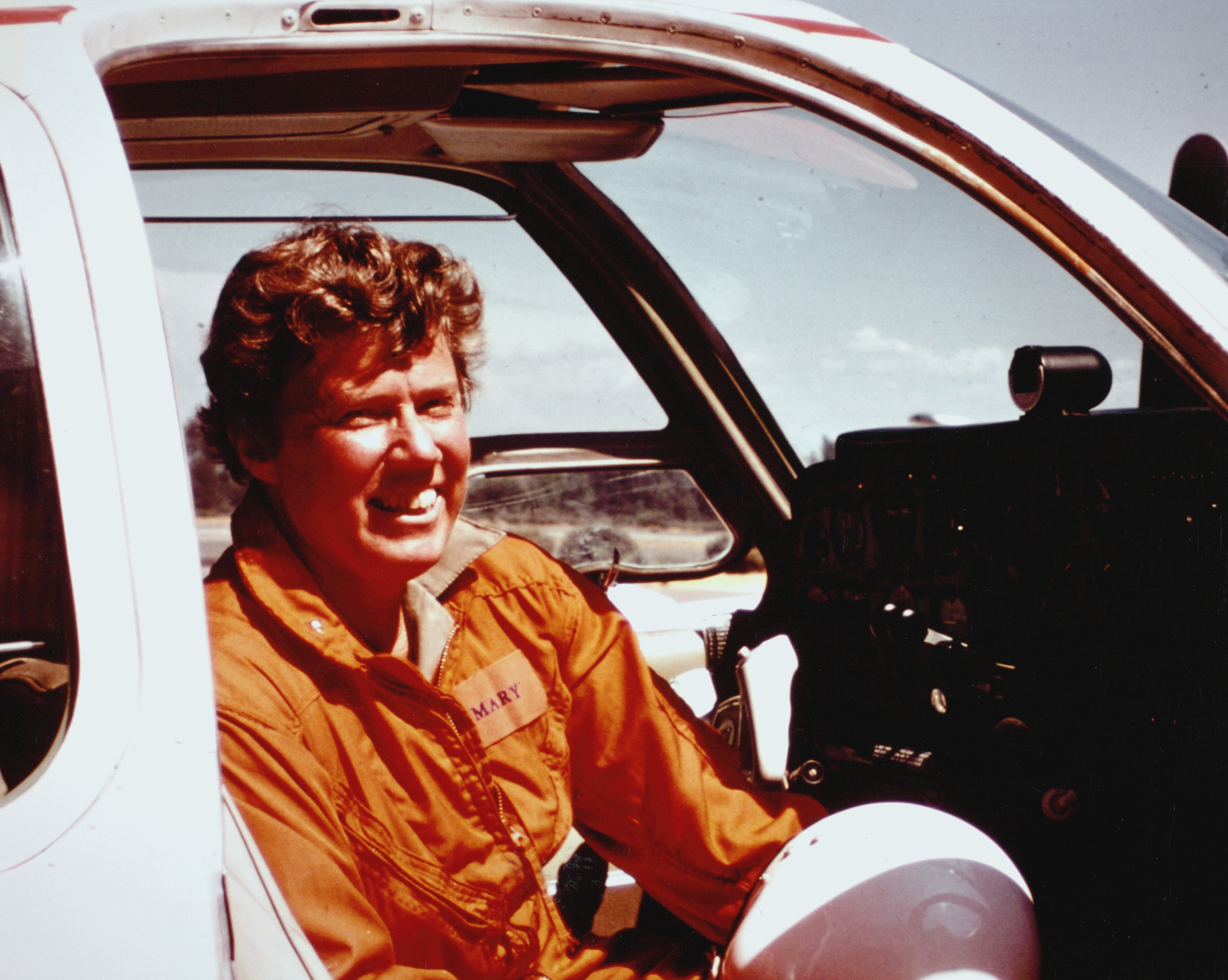
Photo of Mary Barr sitting in the cockpit of her transport plane, 1975

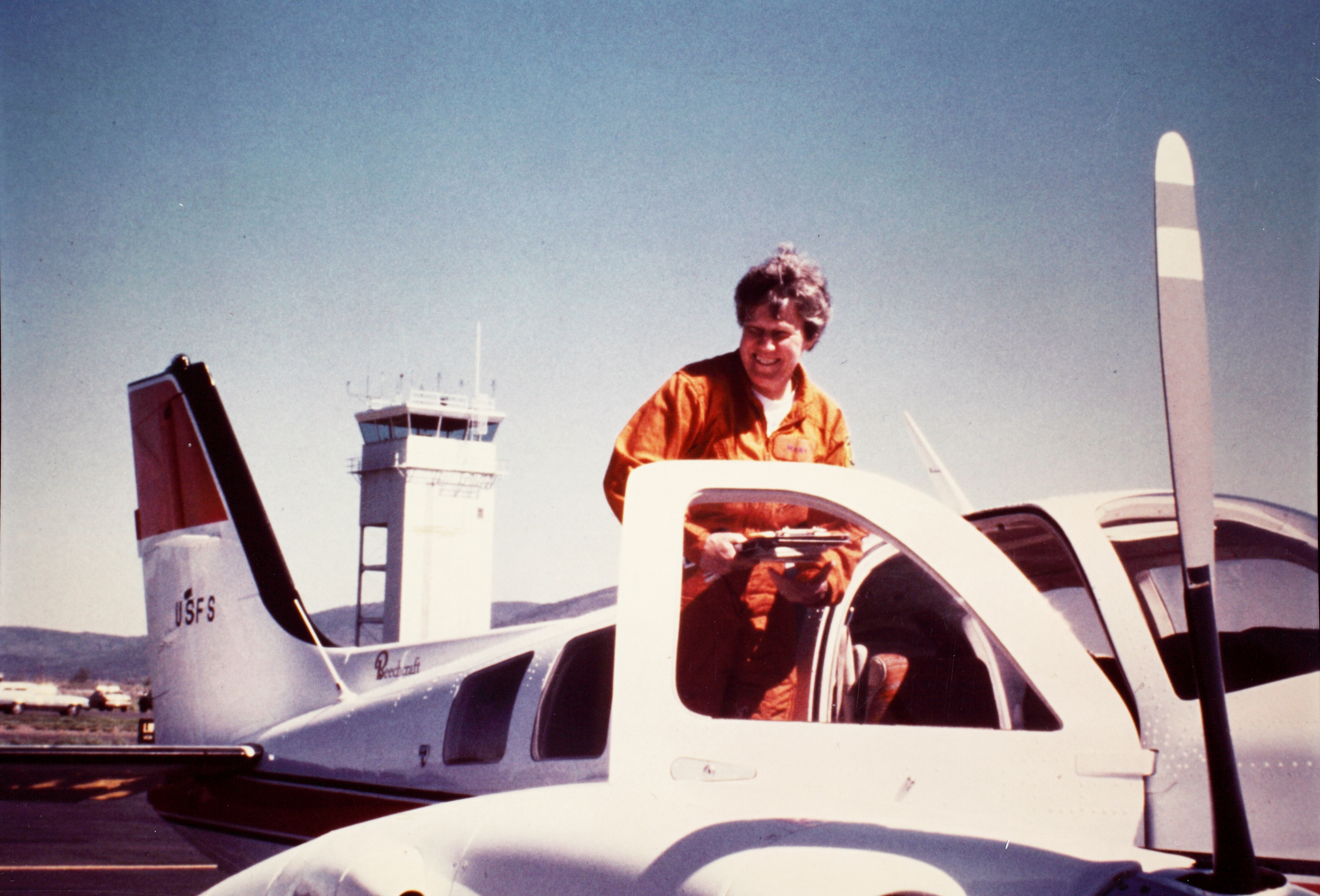
Photo of Mary Barr standing on the wing of her transport plane, 1975
