= Sandra Anderson =

Sandra Anderson may refer to:

- Sandra L. Anderson, airplane pilot with Northwest Airlines
- Sandra Anderson, character in Wilby Wonderful
- Sandra Anderson, character in Legion
- Sandra Anderson, sailor in 2011 Dragon World Championships
- Sandra Lynn Anderson, Citizens for Constitutional Freedom militant in the occupation of the Malheur National Wildlife Refuge
- Sondra Locke (actually Sandra Anderson, 1944–2018), American actress
