= Betty Jane Williams =

American aviator

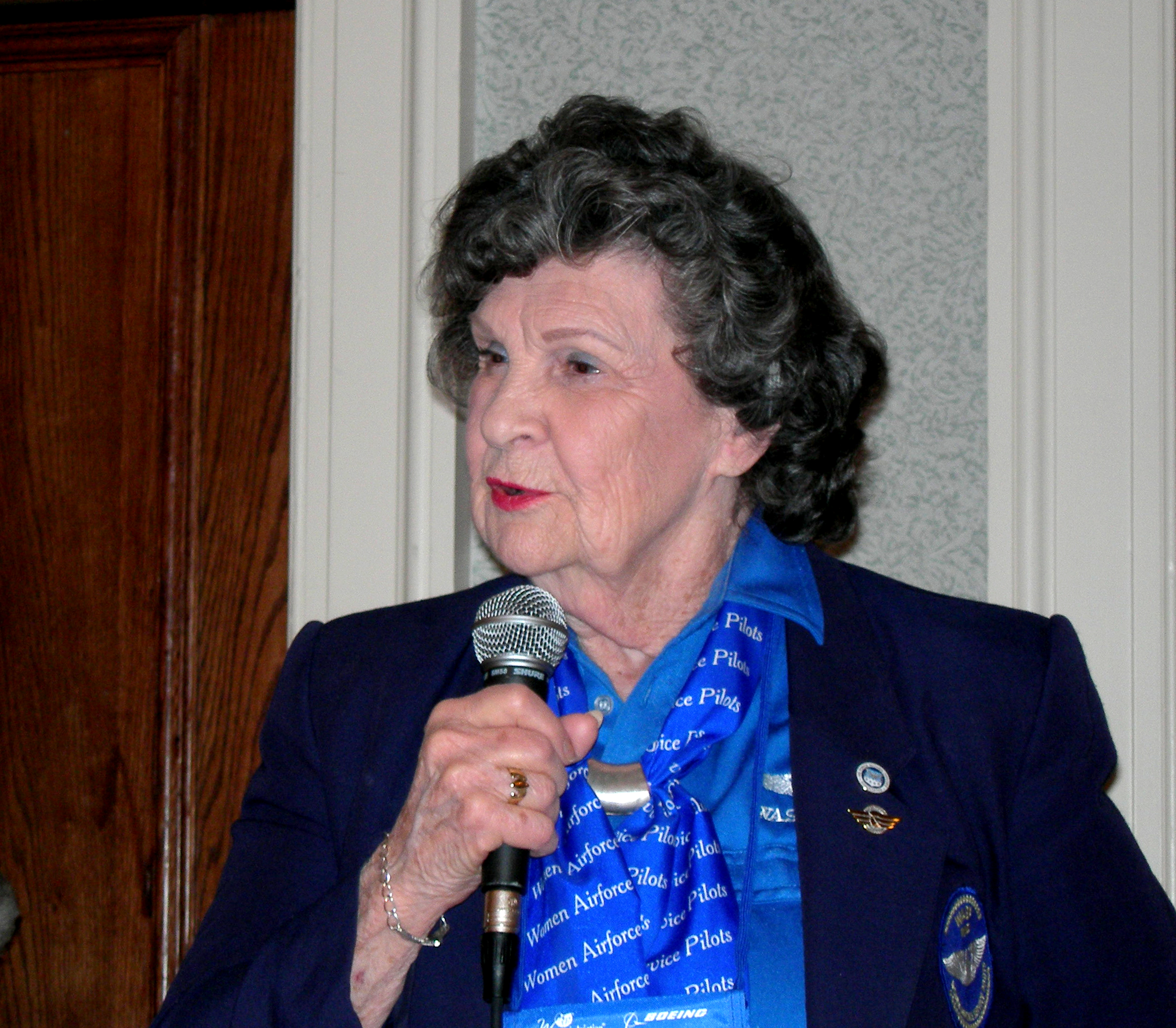
Betty Jane Williams speaking at the 17th annual Women in Aviation International Conference, March 25, 2006

Betty Jane Williams (1919 – December 8, 2008) was an American aviator. She worked in various fields in the aviation industry throughout her life and became a Lieutenant Colonel by the time she retired from the United States Air Force Reserve in 1979. Williams also served as one of the Women Airforce Service Pilots (WASP) in 1944. She was also noted for her military and industrial film-work.

== Biography ==
Williams was born in Kingston, Pennsylvania, in 1919. She became interested in flying after witnessing a barnstorming pilot perform a stunt in 1939.

Williams earned her pilot's license in June 1941 from the Civilian Pilot Training Program. After the United States entered World War II, she was unable to fly and went on to be a flight attendant with the Canadian Colonial Airlines. The company sent her to train at the University of Vermont and then Williams went on to teach both instrument flight techniques to pilots in the Navy and in the civilian sector. In January 1944, she joined the Women Airforce Service Pilots (WASP) where she was a test pilot, flying fixed aircraft to see if they were airworthy again. Williams was stationed at Randolph Field until the deactivation of the WASP on December 20, 1944. Williams continued to train both military and civilian pilots between 1945 and 1947.

Williams developed a show for CBS-TV called Let's Go Flying, which was broadcast in 1947. Between 1948 and 1952, she worked as a technical writer in the aerospace engineering field and wrote flight operations manuals and visual instruction charts for military aircraft. She also created training films for military planes.

When the Korean War broke out, Williams signed up to serve in 1952. She was one of only 2 women who were selected to work on the 1354th Video Production Squadron. After the war, Williams stayed in the Air Force Reserves.

She worked as a motion picture coordinator for the Lockheed California Company between 1954 and 1974. In 1966, Williams was honored by the California Federation of Business and Professional Women for her work writing, producing and directing both industrial and military films. Williams continued to serve in the military for 28 years, attaining the rank of Lieutenant Colonel by the time she retired in 1979.

In 2006, Williams was inducted into the Women in Aviation International Pioneer Hall of Fame. Williams died on December 8, 2008, from complications related to a stroke at the Providence Tarzana Medical Center.
