= Brannen =

Brannen may refer to:

- Brannen (surname)
- Brannen (film), a 1973 Norwegian film
- Brannen Brothers, a manufacturer of custom flutes

== See also ==
- Brannens, a commune in the Gironde department, Nouvelle-Aquitaine, France
