= Lorna deBlicquy =

Canadian aviator

Lorna Vivian deBlicquy

Lorna Vivian deBlicquy (1931–2009) was a pioneering female Canadian aviator who flew for over 50 years, becoming Canada's first woman civil aviation flight test inspector. She contributed significantly to improve conditions for working women pilots. In 2014, she was posthumously inducted into Canada's Aviation Hall of Fame.

== Early life and education ==
Born on 30 November 1931 in Blyth near Goderich, Ontario, Lorna Vivian Morcombe was the daughter of Vivian Morcombe, a bank manager, and Nora Eileen Bray. She was the youngest of the family's four children. When she was 14, she moved with her family to Ottawa, where she learned to fly in a Piper J-3 Cub at the Atlas Aviation Flying School, obtaining her private pilot licence when she was 16. In parallel, she joined the Ottawa Parachute Club. Not only was she their youngest member but, when 16, she was the first woman to make a parachute jump.

== Career ==
In the 1940s, deBlicquy had multiple jobs to pay for her flight lessons which included working at a movie theater and for the Royal Canadian Air Force. In 1952, while studying at Ottawa's Carleton University she qualified for a commercial license and took work at Spartan Air Services as a navigation clerk. The following year she graduated with a B.A. and married fellow student Tony Nichols, a geologist. When her husband found a job in northern Manitoba, they moved to the area near Thompson.

Lorna Nichols was one of the first professional pilots in Manitoba when she flew a Waco biplane for Taylor Airways of Wabowden. She transported passengers such as diamond drillers, fishermen and inspectors to their remote destinations while flying supplies to the northern reserves. In 1956, the couple moved to Sudbury in northern Ontario where Lorna taught English at high school. On becoming a Class III flight instructor, she worked part-time for Sudbury Aviation teaching students to fly.

After her marriage with Nichols ended in 1962, Lorna moved to Ottawa where she became a flight instructor for Bradley Air Services while raising her flight instructor status to Class II at Kingston Flying Club. It was there she met Dick deBlicquy, an experienced pilot who sometimes flew in the Arctic and sometimes piloted helicopters in New Zealand. They two married in 1963 and spent the next two winters in New Zealand where Lorna served as a flight instructor at the Wellington and Marlborough clubs. She also took up gliding.

On their return to Ottawa, their daughter Elaine was born in 1966. In 1967, they moved to Resolute Bay where Lorna worked for Atlas Aviation, flying a de Havilland Beaver. In 1970, Lorna earned a commercial helicopter licence flying a Bell 47 and qualified as a Class I flight instructor. She also won an Amelia Earhart Award from the Ninety-Nines, an international women pilots organization.

In 1975, she was not even invited for an interview when she applied for a job with Air Transit, piloting Twin Otters between Ottawa and Montreal, despite the fact that she had clocked up more than 6,000 hours and had flown Twin Otters in the Arctic. Instead, male pilots were taken on. She charged the company with discrimination in an editorial for the magazine Canadian Flight and commented on the case in the press and on radio talk shows but no action was taken. The following year, she applied for a job with the Department of Transport but was not hired. She became highly critical of the lack of opportunities for women in flying, remarking: "How is it fair that there are programs like air cadets which will pay for young men to fly but that girls like me have to pay our own way?" Following her complaints, Transport Canada policy was changed and she was taken on in 1977 as the first female civil aviation inspector in Canada.

Lorna deBlicquy retired in 1999 and settled near Carp, Ontario. She had flown for over 50 years, totalling 10,478 hours in the air, about half of them as a flight instructor.

== Awards and honours ==
In 1994, deBlicquy was awarded the Order of Ontario. The following year, she was given the Order of Canada in 1995. For hall of fames, deBlicquy was inducted into the Women in Aviation International Hall of Fame in 1996 and posthumously named into the Canada's Aviation Hall of Fame in 2014. She also received the Trans-Canada (McKee) Trophy and the Governor General's Award in Commemoration of the Persons Case, for women who fought for equality.

== Personal life and death ==
Lorna and Dick deBlicquy were divorced in 1995. The couple had a daughter, Elaine, born 1966.

On 21 March 2009, deBlicquy died peacefully from Alzheimer's disease while taking a nap after dinner at her home in Beaverton, Ontario.
