= Brenda E. Robinson =

American military pilot

Brenda E. Robinson (born in 1956) is the first African American female pilot in US Navy history. She has been inducted into the Women in Aviation International Pioneer Hall of Fame. The 59th woman to enter the Navy's training program, she became the 42nd to earn her wings, and the first black woman to earn Wings of Gold.
