= Marty Wyall =

American aviator

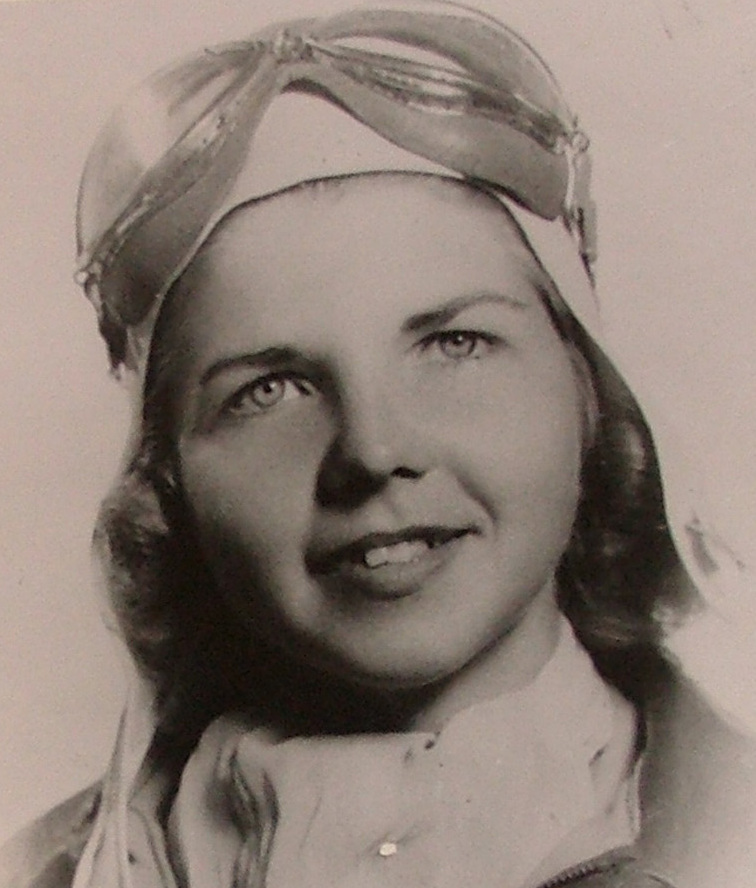
- Born: January 24, 1922; Liberty, Indiana
- Died: March 9, 2017 (aged 95); Fort Wayne, Indiana
- Education: DePauw University
- Occupation: Aviator

Mary Anna Martin "Marty" Wyall (January 24, 1922 – March 9, 2017) was an American aviator. Wyall was part of the last class of Women Airforce Service Pilots (WASP) and later became the unofficial WASP historian. She was instrumental in organizing the WASP veterans together years after they served.

== Biography ==
Wyall was born in Liberty, Indiana on January 24, 1922. She graduated from Shields High School in 1939, then went on to MacMurray's Women's College on a music scholarship. She transferred to DePauw University in her sophomore year where she majored in Liberal Arts. Wyall wanted to join the Women Airforce Service Pilots (WASP) and took flying lessons after she graduated. She paid for her lessons by working at Eli Lilly Pharmaceutical as a lab assistant. She joined WASP in May 1944 and was part of the last WASP class of trainees. She was briefly stationed at Goodfellow Field before WASP was deactivated. She returned to Indiana in December 1944.

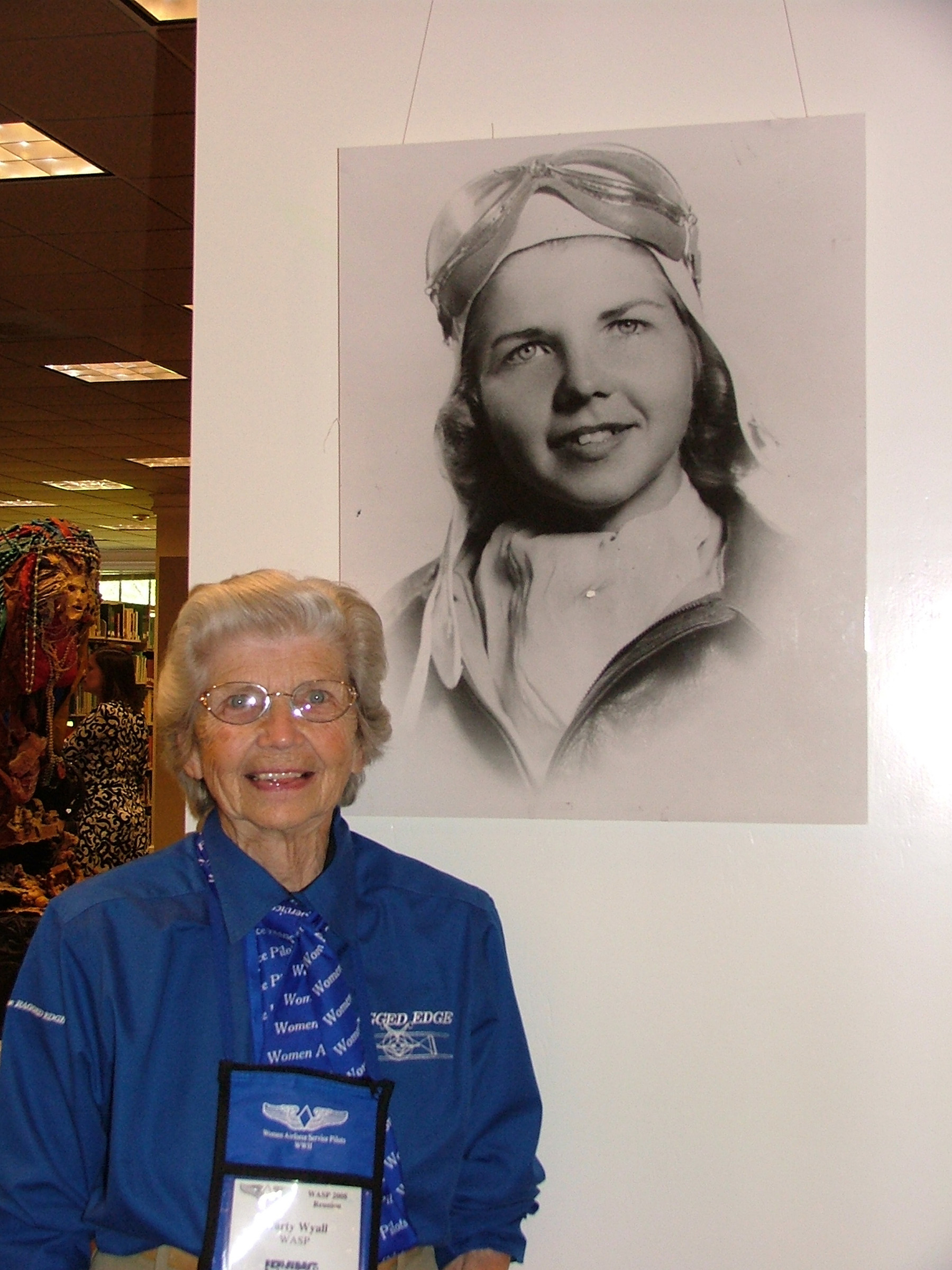
Marty Wyall poses in front of a portrait of herself as a WASP pilot in 2008.

After WASP was disbanded, Wyall worked as a pilot for the Reconstruction Finance Corporation. She later worked at the Sky Harbor Airport as a ferry pilot and a flight instructor at Franklin Flying Field. In 1946, she married and raised five children with her husband, Eugene Andrew Wyall in Fort Wayne.

At a 1964 convention of the Ninety-Nines, Wyall invited the WASPs to meet up, collecting 86 women who all decided to keep meeting every other year. Wyall became the unofficial record-keeper for the archives of those who were WASP. She collected scrapbooks and obituaries, keeping the records in a converted bunkhouse on her farm. In 1978, she was voted by the other WASP veterans to be the "permanent historian" for the group. Later, she donated her archive to the Special Collections department of Texas Women's University.

Wyall was awarded the Congressional Gold Medal in 2010. In 2011, she was inducted into the Women in Aviation International Pioneer Hall of Fame. She died in Fort Wayne on March 9, 2017.
