= Betty Greene =

American missionary pilot

- Born: Elizabeth Everts Greene; 24 June 1920; Seattle, Washington, United States
- Died: 10 April 1997 (aged 76)
- Occupation: missionary pilot
- Known for: helped found Mission Aviation Fellowship
- Notable work: first woman to fly over the Andes mountains
- Awards: Women in Aviation International Pioneer Hall of Fame

Elizabeth Everts Greene (24 June 1920 – 10 April 1997), known as Betty Greene, was an American missionary pilot.

Greene was born in Seattle on 24 June 1920, and started taking flying lessons in 1936. She studied at the University of Washington and served in the Women Airforce Service Pilots in World War II.

Greene was a devout Presbyterian, and helped found Mission Aviation Fellowship. She made its first flight in 1946 when she transported two missionaries of Wycliffe Bible Translators in a Waco UPF-7 biplane to a remote jungle location in Mexico. Later that year she became the first woman to fly over the Andes mountains.

Greene died on 10 April 1997. She was inducted into the Women in Aviation International Pioneer Hall of Fame in 2017.
