= Nelda Lee =

American design and flight test engineer

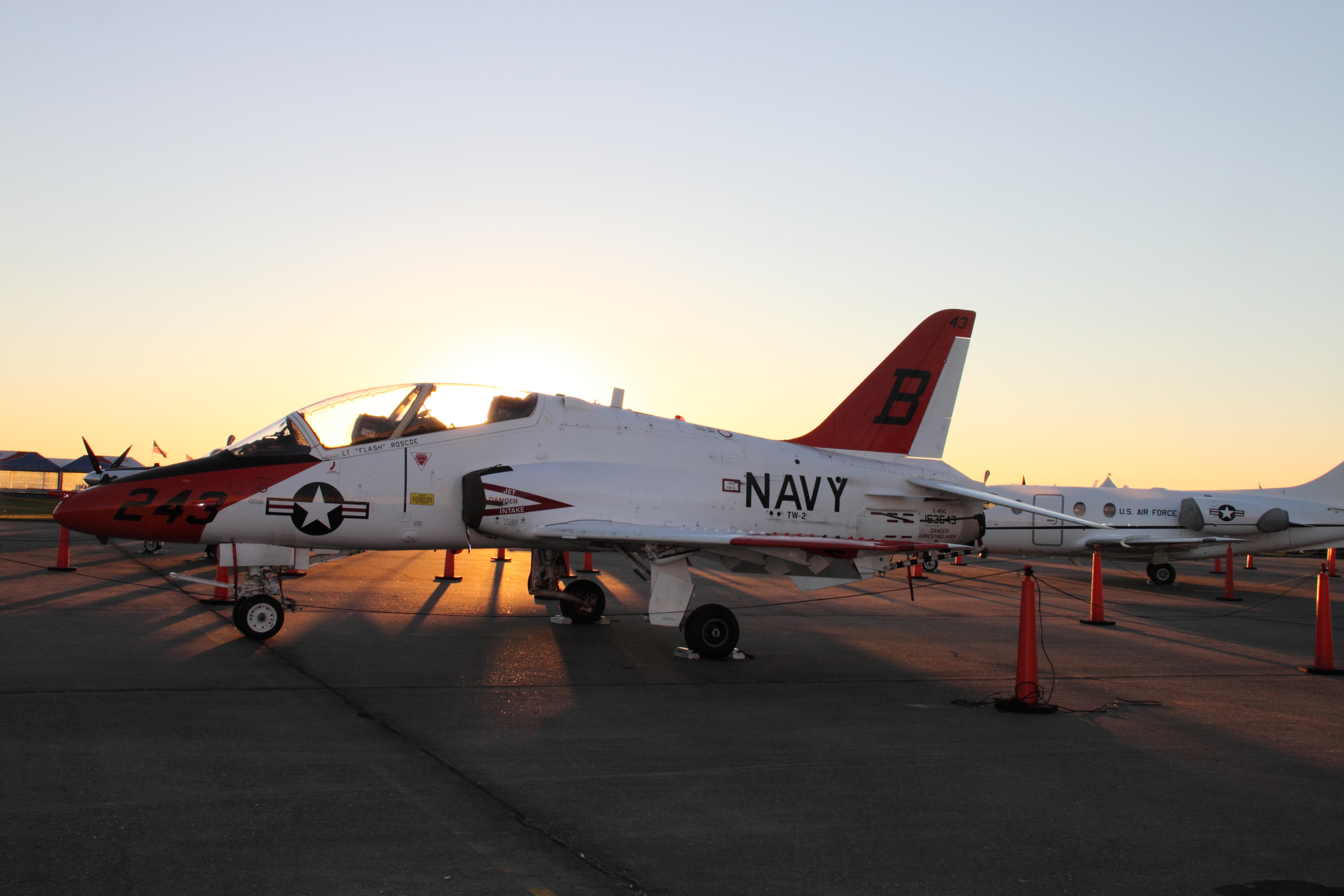
T45-Goshawk

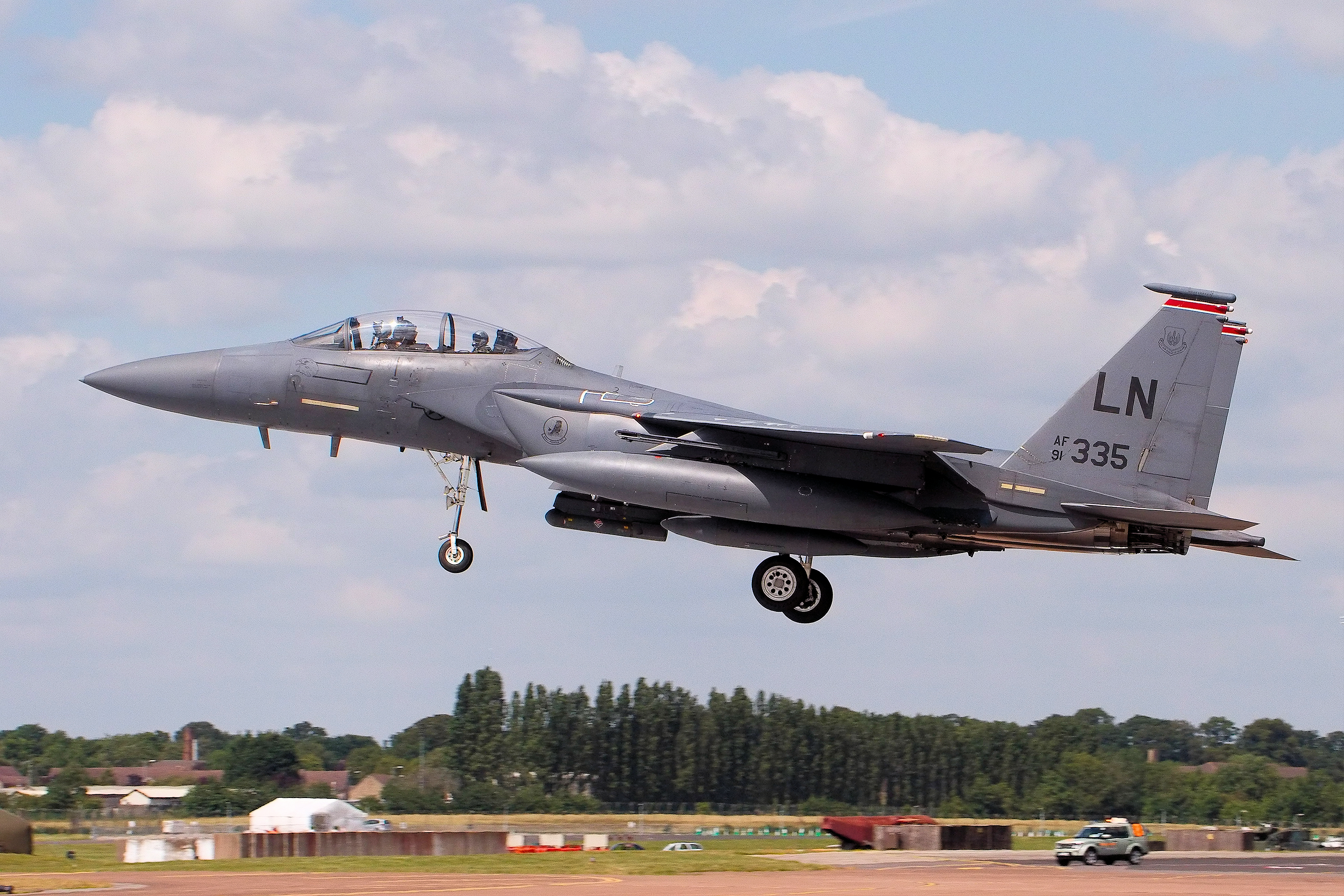
F15 Eagle

Nelda Lee was a Boeing design and flight test engineer. Lee was the first woman to log one and a half hours of flight time in the F-15 eagle. She has been “recognized as a trailblazer in aerospace engineering and aviation”.

== Early life and education ==
Nelda Lee was born and raised in Carrollton, Alabama. Lee attended Auburn University, located in Auburn, Alabama, and graduated the class of 1969. She received her bachelor's degree in aerospace engineering. Lee was the second woman to graduate with an aerospace engineering degree at Auburn University. Lee also received a master's degree in 1999 from Webster University in Management and Human Resources Development.

== Career ==
Lee worked at the well-known aviation company Heritage McDonnell Douglas Company, which is now known as Boeing Company. Her first job was working as an associate engineer at Heritage McDonnell Douglas. She was then an engineer for flight and ground tests of four military planes. These four planes were the F-15 Eagle, AV-8 Harrier, T-45 Goshawk, and F/A-18 Hornet. She was the first woman to record one and a half hours in the F-15 Eagle. After 45 years at a single company, Lee retired from aviation in 2014.

== Awards and achievements ==
Lee has been awarded the following awards/achievements:

- Women in Aviation Pioneers Hall of Fame 2004
- Alabama Engineering Hall of Fame
- Boeing Pride Award (13 times)
- Katherine & Marjorie Stinson Award for Achievement by the National Aeronautics Association in 2010
- Young Professional Award
- Auburn Alumni Association's Lifetime Achievement Award 2017
- Currently serving on the board of trustees for the Amelia Earhart Birthplace Museum

== Personal life ==
Lee continues to enjoy aviation as one of her hobbies. Lee has been a vocal champion for women in the aerospace sector since her retirement. After retiring, she became the president of Whirly-Girls Inc., an association of female helicopter pilots. She is honored for her ongoing commitment to encouraging young women to seek careers in engineering.

== See also ==
- Women in Aviation International Pioneer Hall of Fame
