= Jean Ross Howard Phelan =

Helicopter pilot

- Born: September 5, 1916
- Died: January 29, 2004 (aged 87)
- Education: Sidwell Friends School, George Washington University
- Employer: American Red Cross; Eastern Air Lines
- Works: Whirly-Girls

Jean Ross Howard Phelan (1916–2004) was the founder of the Whirly Girls and the 13th woman in the world to earn her helicopter accreditation.

== Personal life ==
She was born on September 5, 1916, in Washington, D.C., as Jean Ross Howard. Her grandfather was John W. Ross.

== Education ==
Phelan attended Sidwell Friends School and Western High School. She went to Connecticut College and then transferred to George Washington University, where she received a bachelor's degree in history in 1939. In 1955, she earned a master's degree in history from American University with her thesis on "Selected Economic Problems in the Operation of Common Carrier Helicopters."

== Career ==
Phelan worked briefly at Eastern Airlines as a reservations clerk. Phelan, after being inspired by Jackie Cochran, signed up but did not complete the Women's Airforce Service Pilots training. She did earn her pilot's license in 1941. Phelan was asked to stay by Cochran to help run the Women Airforce Service Pilots school. After a year, she joined the Civil Air Patrol, worked for the Red Cross, and then joined the Aircraft Industries Association as an administrative aide in the helicopter division.

In 1954, after convincing her supervisor to allow her to train at the Bell Helicopter School in Fort Worth, Texas, and 18 days of training, Jean became the eight American woman and 13th woman worldwide to earn her helicopter accreditation.

In 1955, she founded the Whirly-Girls International with the goal of building a community of support for women helicopter pilots.

She retired as director of helicopter activities in 1986.

== Awards and recognition ==
Phelan was also the first woman chair of the American Helicopter Society's Annual Forum, hosting forums in 1958 and 1959. For her contributions to the Washington, D.C. aviation community, Jean was presented with the Washington Air Derby Association Trophy in 1963. From 1966 to 1968, she was elected president of the American Women's News Club. In 1969, she was awarded the Lady Drummond Hay Trophy, granted by the Women's International Association of Aeronautics.

Phelan was inducted into the Women in Aviation International's Hall of Fame in 1995.

In 2003, Phelan was named as one of the "100 Women Who Made A Difference" by Women in Aviation.

== Death ==
Phelan died at the age of 87 on January 29, 2004, at George Washington University Medical Center.
