= Galina Korchuganova =

Soviet test pilot and aerobatics champion

Galina Gavrilovna Korchuganova
- Born: 22 March 1935; Barnaul, USSR
- Died: 18 January 2004 (aged 68); Moscow, Russian Federation
- Resting place: Khovanskoye Cemetery
- Education: Moscow Aviation Institute
- Occupations: Test pilot, aerobatics
- Known for: First women's world aerobatics champion

Galina Gavrilovna Korchuganova (Russian: Галина Гавриловна Корчуганова; 22 March 1935 – 18 January 2004) was a Soviet test pilot and aerobatics champion. After graduating from studies in aviation technology in 1959, Korchuganova made a name for herself as a pilot in aerobatics competitions, becoming the first women's world aerobatics champion in 1966. She subsequently trained as a test pilot, going on to set 42 world flight records and flying more than 20 types of aircraft. By the end of her flight career in 1984, she had accumulated more than 4,000 hours of flight time, including 1,500 hours as a test pilot.

In 1992, Korchuganova founded Aviatrissa, the first Russian aviation club for women. She served as its president and increased its membership from 13 to 550, helping to organize aviation forums that brought pilots together from all over the world.

She was posthumously inducted into the Women in Aviation International Pioneer Hall of Fame in 2006.

== Early life and education ==
Galina Gavrilovna Korchuganova was born on 22 March 1935 in Barnaul, Russia. She had an older sister named Nina. Korchuganova discovered her passion for aviation after joining a sport parachute club as a teenager, and she finished high school with top student honours. She studied aviation technology at the Moscow Aviation Institute and graduated in 1959.

== Flight career ==
After graduation, Korchuganova began working at Ramensk Avionics Construction Bureau as an engineer. She flew planes for sport, but dreamed of becoming a professional test pilot – a job not open to Soviet women at the time. When the Soviet paramilitary organization DOSAAF began searching for female space flight candidates in 1962, Korchuganova was included in a shortlist of 18 candidates, although she didn't make it into the next phase of selection.

In 1965, Korchuganova set a world aviation record with a Yak-32 jet on a 100 km closed circuit track. One year later, she competed at the World Aerobatic Championship in Moscow and won gold in the women's individual competition, becoming the first women's world aerobatics champion. Media gave her the nickname "the mistress of the sky". Now, at last, Soviet officials permitted Korchuganova to become a test pilot. She initially struggled to obtain the necessary formal support for her training, facing reluctance from male pilots who were unwilling to work with a woman, but aviator Valentina Stepanova Grizodubova – who worked as head of the Science Research Center of Flight Test – stepped in and supported Korchuganova, and the young test pilot graduated from the Kirovograd flight school in 1969.

Korchuganova went on to achieve 42 world aviation records in multiple types of aircraft, including two YAK-40 world records with cosmonaut Svetlana Savitskaya in 1980. Korchuganova became proficient in more than 20 types of aircraft and gradually advanced from the rank of 5th class test pilot to 2nd class. By the end of her flying career in 1984, she had accumulated more than 4,000 hours of flight time, including 1,500 hours as a test pilot.

She worked at the Museum of Aviation and Astronautics (музее авиации и космонавтики) in Moscow following her retirement.

== Aviatrissa ==
After the end of the Soviet Union in the early 1990s, Korchuganova grew concerned about the lack of support and opportunities for women in aviation; she saw many of her peers being encouraged to take up jobs in unrelated fields, their skills as pilots dismissed. In 1992 Korchuganova founded Aviatrissa, the first Russian aviation club for women. She took on the role of president, and under her leadership club membership gradually grew from 13 to 550.

Aviatrissa organized five international aviation forums over the years, welcoming participants from France, Israel, Estonia, the United States, and various countries of the former Soviet Union. In 1998, Aviatrissa members celebrated the 60th anniversary of a record-breaking flight across Russia by Grizodubova, recreating it themselves with two planes, one Russian and one American, that took off from Tushino. The flight was named Bridge of Wings.

== Death and legacy ==
Following a diagnosis of liver cancer, Korchuganova died on 18 January 2004 and was buried in Khovanskoye Cemetery. She was posthumously inducted into the Women in Aviation International Pioneer Hall of Fame in 2006.
