= Northwest Regional Airport (Texas) =

Aero Valley Airport
- IATA: none; ICAO: none; FAA LID: 52F

Summary
- Airport type: Public Use (Private Ownership)
- Operator: Aero Valley POA
- Serves: Roanoke
- Location: Texas
- Elevation AMSL: 643 ft / 196 m
- Coordinates: 33°03′07″N 97°13′55″W
- Website: http://www.fly52f.org

Map

Runways
Direction	Length		Surface
Direction	ft	m	Surface
17/35	3,500x40	1,067x12	Asphalt, in great condition

Aero Valley Airport (FAA LID: 52F) is a privately owned, public use airport 3 nautical miles (5.6 km) northwest of Roanoke, in Denton County, Texas, United States.

The airport is used solely for general aviation purposes. There is a landing fee for non-based flight school aircraft, call for information.

The airfield was originally called Aero Valley Airport until around 1988. (Note: It is unclear exactly when the name change took place, but National Transportation Safety Board reports for incidents through May 1988 use the Aero Valley name, while reports from June 1988 onward use the Northwest Regional name.) In 2024, the airport name was changed back to the original name

== History ==
Aero Valley Airport was founded by pioneering aviator Edna Gardner Whyte in 1970 following the death of her husband George Whyte. She first flew in 1926 while serving in the United States Navy Nurse Corps. She became a licensed pilot in 1928, and quit her job as a nurse in 1935 to open the New Orleans Air College. She later instructed USAAF and U.S. Navy pilots at Meacham Field during World War II before marrying Mr. Whyte in 1946 and operating Aero Enterprise Flight School with him. Mrs. Whyte won 127 trophies in cross-country air racing, aerobatic competition and other flight contests, served as President of the Ninety-Nines, and was the first female inductee to the Order of Daedalians. After losing her pilot's license following an in-flight heart attack in a Cessna 150 she was piloting on December 12, 1988, Ms. Whyte sold the runway and taxiways at Northwest Regional, but retained ownership of most remaining airport facilities. Ms. Whyte died on February 16, 1992, having lived at the airport until her death.

== Facilities and aircraft ==
Aero Valley Airport covers 81 acres (33 ha) at an elevation of 643 feet (196 m) above mean sea level and has one runway:

- 17/35, 3,500 x 40 ft (1,067 x 12 m) with an estimated 0.1% gradient, asphalt.

For the 12-month period ending December 30, 2018, the airport had 166,000 aircraft operations, an average of 455 per day: 66% local general aviation, 33% transient general aviation, and <1% air taxi. At that time there were 616 aircraft based at this airport: 89% single-engine, 10% multi-engine, and 1% helicopter.

== Accidents and incidents ==
Between 22 September and 3 November 2012, 4 separate accidents were linked to the airport, with 3 actually taking place on site. There were a total of 6 fatalities.

- April 27, 1982: A Beech B23 Musketeer, registration number N6502T, stalled and entered a spin immediately after takeoff; the ensuing crash killed both pilots. Investigators determined that the left-hand seat was not securely locked in place and had traveled to the extreme aft position prior to the crash, likely causing the student pilot to inadvertently pull up and provoke the stall. The seat locking mechanism could be operated normally. The accident report cites the pilot's "improper" preflight inspection as a primary cause, as the unlocked seat evidently went unnoticed.
- June 20, 1982: Immediately following a low-altitude, high-speed pass at Aero Valley, the right-hand winglet of a homebuilt Rutan VariEze, registration number N111CH, separated from the wing and the airplane rolled inverted and crashed. The pilot died and the passenger was serious injured. The accident was attributed to improper construction of the winglet, and the accident report noted additional unspecified deviations from the designer's plans.
- May 15, 2008: 2 pilots in a Piper PA-28-161 Cherokee, registration number N8295X, attempted to land on Runway 35 at the same time that the pilot of a Stinson 108-3, registration number N6805M, initiated a takeoff run. The 2 airplanes collided and came to rest upright with the Piper atop the Stinson. The 3 pilots were able to exit unassisted and suffered minor or no injuries. The pilots reported that they had transmitted their position and intentions on the common traffic advisory frequency (CTAF), and claimed not to have seen the other airplane before the collision occurred, with nearby trees partially obstructing their view. The accident report noted that visual flight rules state that "Aircraft, while on final approach to land or while landing, have the right-of-way over other aircraft... operating on the surface, except that they shall not take advantage of this rule to force an aircraft off the runway surface which has already landed and is attempting to make way for an aircraft on final approach." The accident was attributed to the departing pilot's inadequate visual lookout. Contributing to the accident was the trees/visual obstructions along the runway's approach path.
- May 8, 2009: A Cessna 172N, registration number N172SV, was seriously damaged in a forced landing after losing engine power immediately upon takeoff from Northwest Regional. The pilot suffered minor or no injuries. Investigators found that the throttle control rod-end to carburetor throttle arm hardware was missing; this was deemed to be the primary cause of the crash. A contributing factor was the pilot's decision to fly the airplane without a current annual inspection.
- March 2, 2012: The pilot of a Piper PA-30 Twin Comanche, registration number N373JT, noticed indications of low alternator voltage during en route flight and initiated a precautionary landing after losing radio communications. The aircraft touched down normally, but the main landing gear legs collapsed, causing substantial damage to the aircraft; the pilot suffered minor or no injuries. The investigation revealed that the electrically operated landing gear was functioning normally but did not lock in the DOWN position due to inadequate power; the accident was attributed to the pilot's failure to correctly follow emergency procedures for operating the gear without adequate electrical power.
- September 22, 2012: A Piper PA-28R-180 Cherokee, registration number N4567J, descended to the left and struck trees immediately after takeoff, killing both pilots. NTSB investigators uncovered a history of fuel contamination problems with the accident aircraft, and determined the probable cause(s) of this accident as follows: The loss of engine power during takeoff due to fuel contamination. Contributing to the accident was maintenance personnel's failure to adequately correct the water contamination effects. Contributing to the severity of the occupants' injuries was the lack of shoulder restraints.
- October 11, 2012: A Meyers Little Toot (Note: The accident aircraft may be a Meyer Little Toot (no "s"), but the NTSB report does not make this clear.), registration number N848Z, lost power on takeoff. The pilot landed on the remaining runway but was unable to stop the aircraft, which overran the end of the runway, collided with two fences, and came to rest inverted. The aircraft was substantially damaged but the pilot suffered minor or no injuries. The accident was attributed to fuel starvation; examination of the airframe revealed that the fuel lines were partially obstructed with sealant that had been used on an in-tank fuel gauge to create a gasket, which is found deteriorated.
- November 3, 2012: The landing gear of a Cessna 172S, registration number N985GE, struck an automobile driving on the access road that crosses the approach end of Runway 17. The Cessna's nose and left main landing gear collapsed on landing and the aircraft slid off the runway, causing substantial damage. The student pilot was not injured, while the automobile driver and passenger sustained minor injuries. The NTSB accident report noted that "The displaced threshold for the landing runway was located about [140 feet (43 m)] from the approach end of the runway. The roadway... was located about [25 feet (7.6 m)] from the approach end of the runway pavement, about [165 feet (50 m)] from the displaced threshold. Data indicated that the runway threshold was previously displaced [400 feet (120 m)]. Although the privately-owned airport was not required to maintain airport design standards established by the Federal Aviation Administration, the proximity of the roadway and the reduced runway threshold displacement did not provide any safety margin for approaching aircraft." The accident was primarily attributed to the pilot's failure to maintain clearance from obstacles on the runway approach path. Contributing factors were the airport management's decision to relocate the runway displaced threshold, which did not provide an adequate safety margin for approaching aircraft, and the automobile driver's inadequate lookout for approaching aircraft before crossing the runway's approach path.
- September 7, 2018: A Piper PA-32, registration number N33354, lost engine power on takeoff and was substantially damaged in the subsequent off-airport forced landing. 1 passenger suffered serious injuries, the pilot and 2 passengers suffered minor injuries, and 2 passengers were not injured. Post-crash testing revealed that the right magneto had failed, and the engine could not be started in post-crash condition, but started and ran normally after several spark plugs were replaced. The cause of the accident is under investigation.

== See also ==
- List of airports in Texas
