= Sandra L. Anderson =

American airplane pilot

Sandra L. Anderson is a former airplane pilot with Northwest Airlines. She is known as a pioneer in the airline community and was one of the first women pilots to fly a commercial airliner.

== Early life ==
Anderson received a bachelor's degree in art at the Texas Woman's University, where she minored in music and physical education. From 1970 to 1973, she taught at the La Marque, Texas school district. Later, she worked as a graphic artist with Exxon. She married NASA engineer and skydiver Dick Anderson who died several years later in 1975 in an accident.

== Flying career ==
After the death of her husband, Anderson pursued a career in flying. In 1978, she applied to several airlines after she had earned the necessary flight certificates without success. In order to increase her odds of being hired, Anderson then enrolled in the B-727 flight engineer's school. In 1979, she was hired by Northwest Orient Airlines. She was the second female pilot they had hired. She served numerous positions, including Fleet Check Captain, Chief Pilot at the Minneapolis/ St. Paul crew base, and Captain flying a Boeing 747-400.

In the early 1990s, she became a founding board member of Women in Aviation, International. In 1995, she received a master's degree in Human Resources from the American University. She has also received the Northwest Airlines Humanitarian Award, recognition from the National Aviation Club for her "tireless dedication to promoting aviation", and is a board member of Women in Aviation International. By 1996, she was an assistant Chief Pilot and Flight Manager for Northwest Airlines. She was the first woman at any airline to hold that position.

In 2005, she was inducted into the Women in Aviation International Pioneer Hall of Fame by Women in Aviation, International.
