= Ann Shaw Carter =

American aviator

Ann Shaw in 1944, training as a WASP

Ann Shaw Carter (December 5, 1922 – September 26, 2005) was an American pilot who was the first female commercial helicopter pilot and the second woman to fly a helicopter, after the German pilot, Hanna Reitsch.

Carter was born in Brooklyn, N.Y., on December 5, 1922, and moved to Fairfield, Connecticut, as a child. During World War II, she studied aircraft building in Bridgeport, Connecticut. She then got a job with Chance-Vought as a factory riveter, assembling F4U Corsair aircraft, to finance flying lessons. She joined the Women Airforce Service Pilots (WASP) in 1944, training in Texas, and was a member of the last graduating set before the program was discontinued that year.

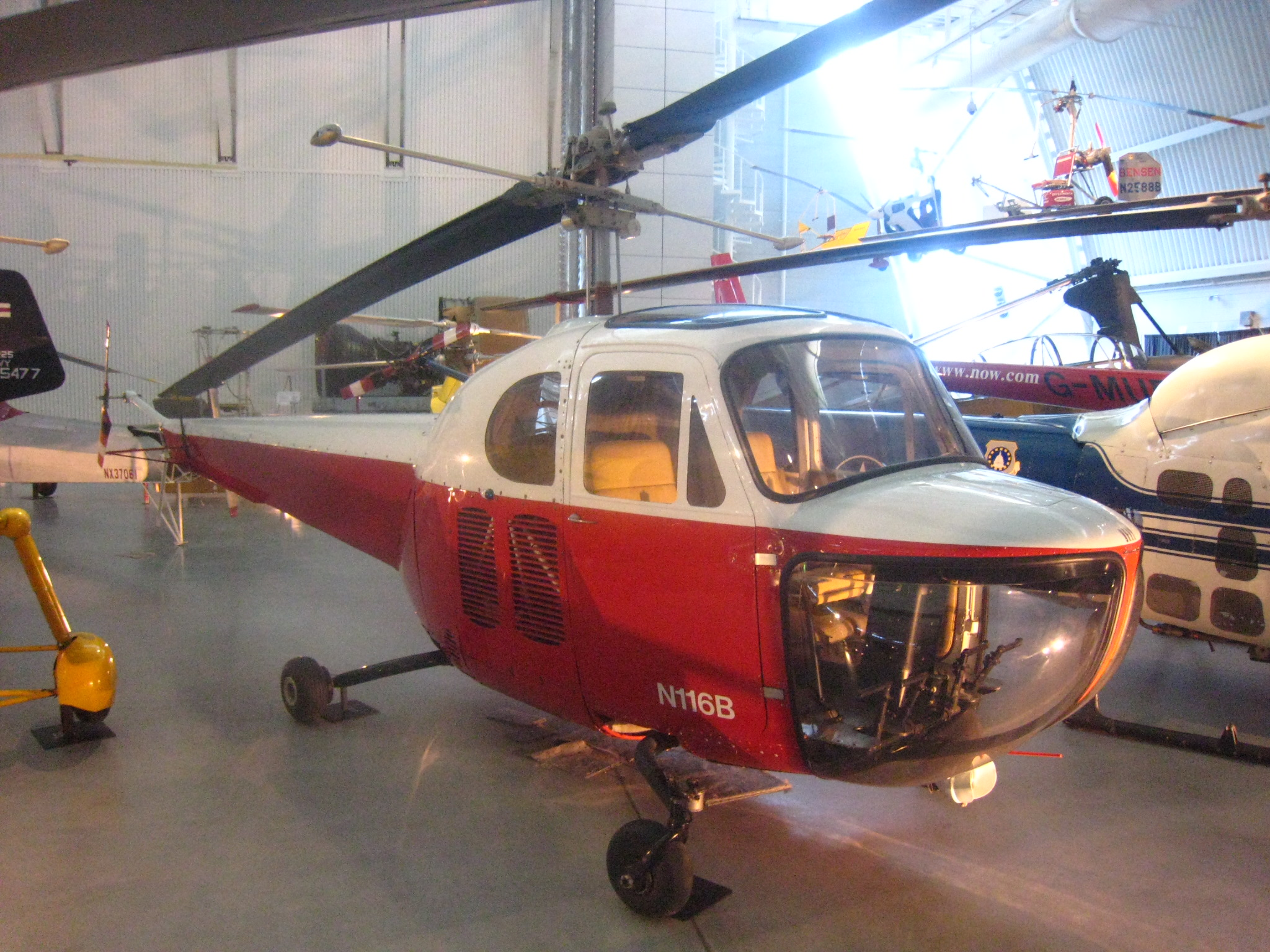
A Bell 47B, one of the helicopter models that Shaw Carter flew

After the end of the war, she was the first American woman to learn to pilot a helicopter, receiving her commercial helicopter license on June 12, 1947, more than nine years after Hannah Reitsch's demonstration flight in February 1938. She became a pilot with the Metropolitan Aviation Corporation, piloting New York City sightseeing trips and charter flights. She is documented as the world's first female commercial helicopter pilot. She flew Bell Helicopters, including a Bell 47B. In 1955, she was one of the six founding members of the Whirly-Girls, which dubbed her "Whirly Girl #2"; she was one of several society members to meet President John F. Kennedy in a visit to the White House in 1961. One of the helicopters that she flew was preserved by the American Helicopter Museum in West Chester, Pennsylvania. Her aviation career was cut short by polio towards the end of the 1950s.

== Later life ==
In later life, Carter continued to live in Fairfield, Connecticut. She was married to Edward Carter (died 2004); the couple had three children. She was active in local politics and in the early 1990s, was one of the founders of Friends of Open Space, a Fairfield organization that aimed to conserve open land for community use. In 1999, she and her husband gave 2.2 acres of land to the Connecticut branch of the National Audubon Society, a conservation charity, to facilitate access to a Fairfield wildlife sanctuary.

Carter died on September 26, 2005, at the age of 83, after a car accident.
