= Dorothy Swain Lewis =

American aviator

- Born: Dorothy Swain; September 30, 1915; Asheville, North Carolina
- Died: September 9, 2013 (aged 97); Fern Valley, California
- Occupations: Aviator, artist

Dorothy Swain Lewis (September 30, 1915 – September 9, 2013) was an American aviator who trained Navy pilots and flew with the Women Airforce Service Pilots (WASP) program during World War II. She was also an artist who created a series of cast-bronze sculptures of WASP pilots for various World War II memorial sites.

== Education and personal life ==
Dorothy "Dot" Swain was born near Asheville, North Carolina, to Mozelle Stringfield Swain, a concert pianist, and John Edward Swain, a lawyer.

Swain got her bachelor's degree from Randolph-Macon Woman's College (1936) and went on to study art at the New York Art Students League. In the 1950s, she got her master's degree in art from Scripps College.

In the late 1940s, she married Albert Z. Lewis, with whom she had a son, Albert Z. Lewis, Jr.

== Aviation career ==
Lewis got her airplane pilot's license in 1941 and then spent some months working for Piper Aircraft in Lock Haven, Pennsylvania. In 1942, she was one of 10 women chosen for a special flight instructor training program established by aviation pioneer Phoebe Omlie. After receiving her commercial pilot and ground instructor ratings, she went on to train four classes of naval aviators. She then joined the Women Airforce Service Pilots (WASP) program, where she both taught trainee pilots and herself flew fighters and bombers on maintenance and training missions. Aircraft she flew included the Bell P-63 Kingcobra, Martin B-26 Marauder, and Curtiss P-40 Warhawk. She remained in the Air Force reserve until her discharge in 1957.

After the war, Lewis worked as chief flight instructor at the airport in Daytona Beach, Florida. She also took part in air shows like the 1st All Women's Airshow in Tampa, Florida (1947).

In 2010, Lewis was awarded the Congressional Gold Medal at a special ceremony commemorating the ground-breaking achievements of WASPs in World War II. She has also been designated one of Women in Aviation International's Pioneers of Aviation.

== Art career ==
Lewis eventually moved to Arizona, where she taught for more than two decades at the Orme School, a college-preparatory high school situated on a cattle ranch near the town of Mayer. In addition to science, history, and art, she taught flying and horseback riding. She established a local Fine Arts Festival that is still active.

Lewis worked in many media, including painting, drawing, printmaking, ceramics, and sculpture. She was commissioned to paint the official portrait of U.S. Attorney General Janet Reno, which hangs in the U.S. Department of Justice. She also created a series of cast-bronze sculptures of "The WASP Trainee," a young woman in a flight suit striding looking skyward with the inscription "We Live in the Wind and Sand and our Eyes are on the Stars" on the base, placed at various World War II memorial sites, including those in the U.S. Air Force Academy's Honor Court, at The High Ground in Neillsville, Wisconsin, at the National WASP Museum in Sweetwater, Texas, and at the College Park Aviation Museum in Maryland. The bronze statue on the Air Force Academy Honor Court in Colorado Springs stands near another statue that commemorates the African American Tuskegee airmen. She created a bust of aviator Jacqueline Cochran for the Jacqueline Cochran Regional Airport in Thermal, California, and an oil painting of Cochran for the 99s Museum of Women Pilots at the headquarters of the Ninety-Nines (the International Organization of Women Pilots) in Oklahoma City, Oklahoma. She illustrated the book We Were WASPs by her fellow aviator Winifred Wood.

Lewis later moved to California, where she taught at the Idyllwild School of Music and the Arts. She lived in Fern Valley near Idyllwild, where she died in 2013.
