= Rosella Bjornson =

Canadian aviator

Rosella Marie Bjornson AOE
- Born: July 13, 1947 (age 79); Lethbridge, Alberta, Canada
- Occupation: Aviator
- Spouse: Bill Pratt
- Children: 2

Rosella Marie Bjornson, AOE (born July 13, 1947) is a retired Canadian airline pilot, who was the first woman in North America to be hired as a First Officer for a Canadian airline and the first woman member of the Canadian Air Line Pilots Association, International.

== Education and career ==
Bjornson attended Champion School and County Central High School in Vulcan, Alberta. She attended the University of Calgary after graduating from high school, where she worked to obtain a Bachelor of Science in Geology and Geography. Bjornson spent her summers working on her commercial license and instructor rating. In July 1964, her parents gave her a birthday present of a flight lesson at the Air West Flight School in Lethbridge, Alberta.

Bjornson was a key figure in the formation of the University of Calgary Flying Club and also set the groundwork for the development of an Alberta Flying Farmer Teen Chapter by volunteering with the first group of Girl Guide Air Rangers in Calgary. After graduating from university in 1969, The Winnipeg Flying Club recruited her as a flying instructor.

Rosella was hired as Transair's first female first officer in North America in 1973, following multiple rejections. She was the first female airline pilot in Canada, the first female captain in Canadian aviation, the first woman to receive the Royal Canadian Flying Clubs Association's 89th Gold Seal of Proficiency, the first female officer on a Transair Fokker F-28 jet, and the first female member of the Canadian Air Line Pilots Association.

Rosella made a difference in the lives of female pilots across Canada, particularly when it came to pregnancy regulations. In 1979, when she was pregnant for the first time, a national regulation stated that a woman could not fly while pregnant. Because there was no maternity leave at the time, Rosella had to take unpaid leave for the duration of her pregnancy. She worked with Transport Canada to alter the restrictions surrounding pregnancy and flying after this encounter.

Rosella's pursuit of her work thrust her into the spotlight, despite the fact that she is not a self-proclaimed feminist. She was inducted into the International Forest of Friendship in 1988, and the Canadian Aviation Hall of Fame in 1997. She's also a member of the Women in Aviation International Pioneer Hall of Fame and a National Transportation Award of Achievement recipient.

When flying for Canadian Airlines International in 1990, Bjornson became the first Canadian woman to be promoted to the rank of captain. She went on to work for Air Canada and Zip before retiring in 2004 after 18,000 hours of flying for five different airlines. She now works as a motivational speaker and an advocate for women in aviation, and she still flies in her spare time.

== Honours ==
On May 25, 1972, Bjornson was awarded the 89th Gold Seal Proficiency from the Royal Canadian Flying Clubs Association.

In 1988, Bjornson was inducted into the International Forest of Friendship.

In 1997, Bjornson was inducted into the Canadian Aviation Hall of Fame.

In 2004, Bjornson was inducted into the Women in Aviation International Pioneer Hall of Fame.

In 2014, Bjornson was honoured with a commemorative postage stamp.

In 2017, Bjornson was awarded a Masters Commendation by The Honourable Company of Air Pilots for her contributions to equality for women in the airlines in Canada.

In 2018, Bjornson was appointed to the Alberta Order of Excellence.
