= Brannen (surname) =

Brannen is a surname. Notable people with the surname include:

- John Brannen (born 1974), American basketball coach
- John Brannen (singer) (born 1952), American roots rock/ heartland rock, singer-songwriter
- Julia Brannen, British sociologist
- Karen Fuller Brannen, United States Marine Corps female fighter strike pilot
- Nathan Brannen (born 1982), Canadian middle-distance runner
- Paul Brannen (born 1962), British politician
