= Dawn Seymour =

Airforce Service Pilot during World War II

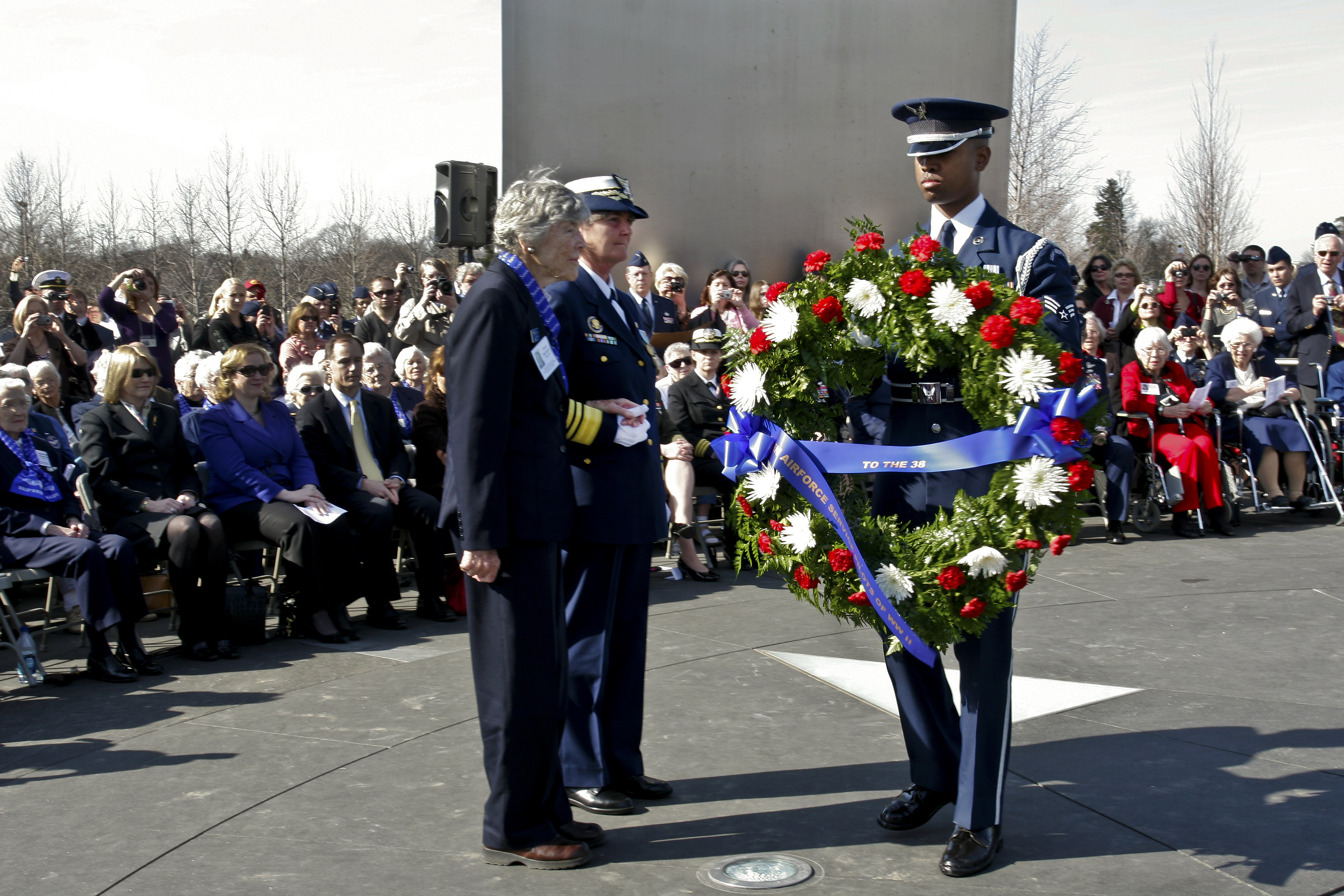
- Dawn Seymour at a commemorative event
- Born: July 1, 1917
- Died: July 18, 2017 (aged 100)
- Military career
- Allegiance: United States
- Branch: Women Airforce Service Pilot

Dawn Seymour (July 1, 1917 - July 18, 2017) was an American pilot and member of the Women Airforce Service Pilots during World War II. She would later lobby for military status for the Women Airforce Service Pilots as well as encourage recognition of their contributions to the war effort during World War II.

== Early life ==
Seymour was born in Rochester, New York on July 1, 1917.

She was the first woman accepted into the Civilian Pilot Training Program at Cornell University. In 1939, she earned a bachelor's degree from Cornell.

== During World War II ==
During World War II, Seymour was a Women's Airforce Service Pilot, or WASP at Buckingham Air Force Base in Florida.

== Later life ==
She actively campaigned for military status for the Women Airforce Service Pilots.

== Honors ==
Her 100th birthday party was celebrated at the opening reception of Women in Aviation International’s 2017 annual conference.

== Publications ==
- Seymour, Dawn, Clarice I. Bergemann, Jeanette J. Jenkins, and Mary Ellen Keil. Women Airforce Service Pilots, WWII: In Memoriam : Thirty-Eight American Women Pilots Gave Their Lives in Performance of Duty with the United States Army Air Forces 1942-1943-1944. Denton, Tex: Texas Woman's University Press, 1996. OCLC 34930045

== Death and legacy ==
She died aged 100 on July 18, 2017.
