= Edna Gardner Whyte =

American aviator (1902–1992)

- Born: November 3, 1902; Mankato, Minnesota, U.S.
- Died: February 15, 1992 (aged 89)
- Occupations: Aviator, air racer, nurse
- Known for: New Orleans Air College; Aero Enterprise Flight School
- Notable work: Rising Above It

Edna Gardner Whyte (November 3, 1902 – February 15, 1992) was an American aviator whose career as a pilot and instructor spanned more than four decades. She was also an air racer who won more than two dozen races.

== Biography ==
Edna Marvel Gardner was born in 1902 in Mankato, Minnesota, U.S. Her father died in a train accident when she was 8, she was raised by her mother. She trained to become a registered nurse, earning her certification in 1924.

She took her first flight in 1926, from Renton, Washington. Her first solo was on January 1, 1931, and she received her pilot's license in May 1931. The following year, she joined the Navy Nurse Corps in Washington, D.C., and taught flying at several nearby airports. She resigned from the Nurse Corps in 1935, preferring to spend her time flying and teaching flying.

Beginning in 1930, she participated in over a hundred air races, winning more than two dozen of them and placing in another dozen. She won the Women's International Air Race four times (1953, 1958, 1960, and 1961). Her last win came in 1967, and her last race was in 1972.

She owned and ran the New Orleans Air College at Shusham Airport from 1935 to 1941. During World War II, she trained hundreds of military pilots at Meacham Field and the Spartan School of Aviation.

After marrying George M. Whyte, she operated Aero Enterprise Flight School with him in Fort Worth, Texas, until his death in 1970. She then opened Aero Valley Airport in nearby Roanoke, where she continued flight instruction.

She received over 80 aviation awards, including the Charles Lindbergh Lifetime Achievement Award and the 1967 Aviation Woman of the Year award from the Women's National Aeronautical Association. She was a charter member (#10) of the Whirly-Girls and the first woman to be an honorary member of the Daedalians, a worldwide fraternity of military pilots. She served as president of the women aviator's association Ninety-Nines from 1955 to 1957. In 1985, Whyte was inducted into the Texas Women's Hall of Fame.

In 1991, at the age of 89, she published her autobiography, Rising Above It (coauthored with Ann Lewis Cooper). Whyte died the following year. Her papers are held by the University of North Texas.

== Partial list of races won ==
- 1930 Closed Course Pylon Race (Racine, Wisconsin)
- 1933 Kate Smith Trophy, National Air Pageant (Long Island, New York)
- 1934 Annette Gipson Trophy Race (Roosevelt Field, New York)
- 1934 Men and Women Pylon Race (Baltimore, Maryland)
- 1937 Women's Alcazar Trophy Race (Miami, Florida)
- 1939 K.K. Culver Trophy Race (Miami, Florida)
- 1953 Women's International Air Race (Canada to Florida)
- 1954 Skylady Derby Efficiency Race (Raton, New Mexico, to Kansas City, Missouri.)
- 1957 Dallas Doll Derby Efficiency Race (Dallas, Texas)
- 1958 Women's International Air Race (Canada to Grand Bahamas)
- 1960 Women's International Air Race (Florida to El Salvador)
- 1961 Women's International Air Race (Florida to Bahamas)
- 1964 U.S.A. Rally, Men and Women (Winter Haven, Florida)

Note
Source for partial list of races won.

== Other sources ==
- Whyte, Edna Gardner; Cooper, Ann (1991), Rising Above It, Orion Books, ISBN 0517576856
- Thomas, Julie (1996), The Ninety-Nines, Turner, ISBN 9781563112034
