= Karen Fuller Brannen =

American marine strike pilot

- Military career
- Allegiance: United States
- Branch: United States Marine Corps
- Service years: 1994-2007
- Rank: Lieutenant colonel
- Known for: First female 'Wings of Gold' recipient
- Conflicts: Global War on Terror

Karen Fuller Brannen (née Tribbett) was the first United States Marine Corps female strike fighter pilot.

== Military career ==
She joined the armed forces in 1994 and left active duty in 2007, but remains a reserve Colonel in the Marine Corps. During her career she attained the rank of major, then progressed to Lt. Col.

== Civilian career ==
After leaving active duty, she started working for Gulfstream.

== Awards ==
She was inducted into the Women in Aviation International Pioneer Hall of Fame in 2013, becoming the first marine inducted. She was a USMC F/A-18 pilot for 3 years, before being the first woman to be awarded 'wings of gold'.

== Personal life ==
She married Matt Brannen in 2010.
