= Whirly-Girls =

Whirly-Girls International
- Founded: 1955
- Type: Trade Association
- Purpose: Promotion of women in the helicopter industry through scholarship awards, mentoring, public appearances, press releases, magazine articles and informational displays in aviation museums.
- Location: Palm Harbor, Florida, U.S.
- Members: 1,700
- Website: whirlygirls.org

The Whirly-Girls, officially known as Whirly-Girls International, are a non-profit, charitable and educational organization that aims to advance women in helicopter aviation. They are an affiliate member of the Helicopter Association International. The Whirly-Girls and the Ninety-Nines have many members in common.

== History ==
The Whirly-Girls were founded by Jean Ross Howard Phelan, an American helicopter pilot, in 1955. At the time there were so few women with helicopter ratings that the group started with only 13 charter members representing the United States, Germany, and France. The Whirly-Girls provided a community for female helicopter pilots to share interests, remove feelings of isolation, and to come together in annual "Hoverings" beginning in April 1955. Today the organization has over 1,700 members from 44 different countries. An early member ("Whirly-Girl #1") was Hanna Reitsch, who flew her helicopter inside Berlin's Deutschlandhalle in 1938. Member #2 was Ann Shaw Carter, the first female commercial helicopter pilot. Charter member #10 was aviator Edna Gardner Whyte.

The organization's logo was inspired by a recruiting show put on by the U.S. Army in the early 1950s. Four helicopters performed a square dance, with a caller on the microphone and a band playing "Turkey in the Straw". Two of the helicopters were decorated to represent the boys, and the other two represented the girls. The "girl" helicopters were topped with blonde wigs fashioned from dyed floor mops, and faces were painted on them in the style of Betty Boop.

The scholarship program was started in 1968 in memory of Doris Mullen, a former member. It was incorporated in 1974, and became an international program in 1978. The program provides flight training scholarships to eligible women.

Phelan received the National Aeronautic Association's Elder Statesman of Aviation Award in 1994.
