= Women in Aviation International =

- Founded: 1990 (Incorporated 1994)
- Founder: Dr. Peggy Chabrian
- Type: Professional Association
- Website: www.wai.org

Women in Aviation International (WAI) is an organization dedicated to increasing the number of women involved in all aspects of aviation and aerospace. As an international nonprofit organization, WAI provides networking, education, mentoring, and scholarship opportunities for women and men in careers in aviation and aerospace.

== About ==
WAI publishes a magazine called Aviation for Women which has six issues per year, as well as Aviation for Girls (AFG) once a year. WAI also sponsors scholarships for members of WAI.

== History ==
Dean of academic support at Embry-Riddle Aeronautical University, Peggy Baty Chabrian, had experienced problems recruiting and retaining female aviation students. In order to attract more women, she suggested creating a seminar and invited Moya Lear, Jeana Yeager, Shannon Lucid and Bobbi Trout to speak at the first annual conference in 1990. From that conference, an informal organization was created.

WAI was incorporated in 1994. As the founder of the WAI Conference, Chabrian was named the first full-time president and CEO of the organization in 1996 by the board of directors. By 1998, the group had 3,000 members, and as of September 2023, membership numbered over 17,000 worldwide.

WAI sponsored the first Arab Women in Aviation show at the Dubai International Convention Center in May 2016.

== Annual conference ==
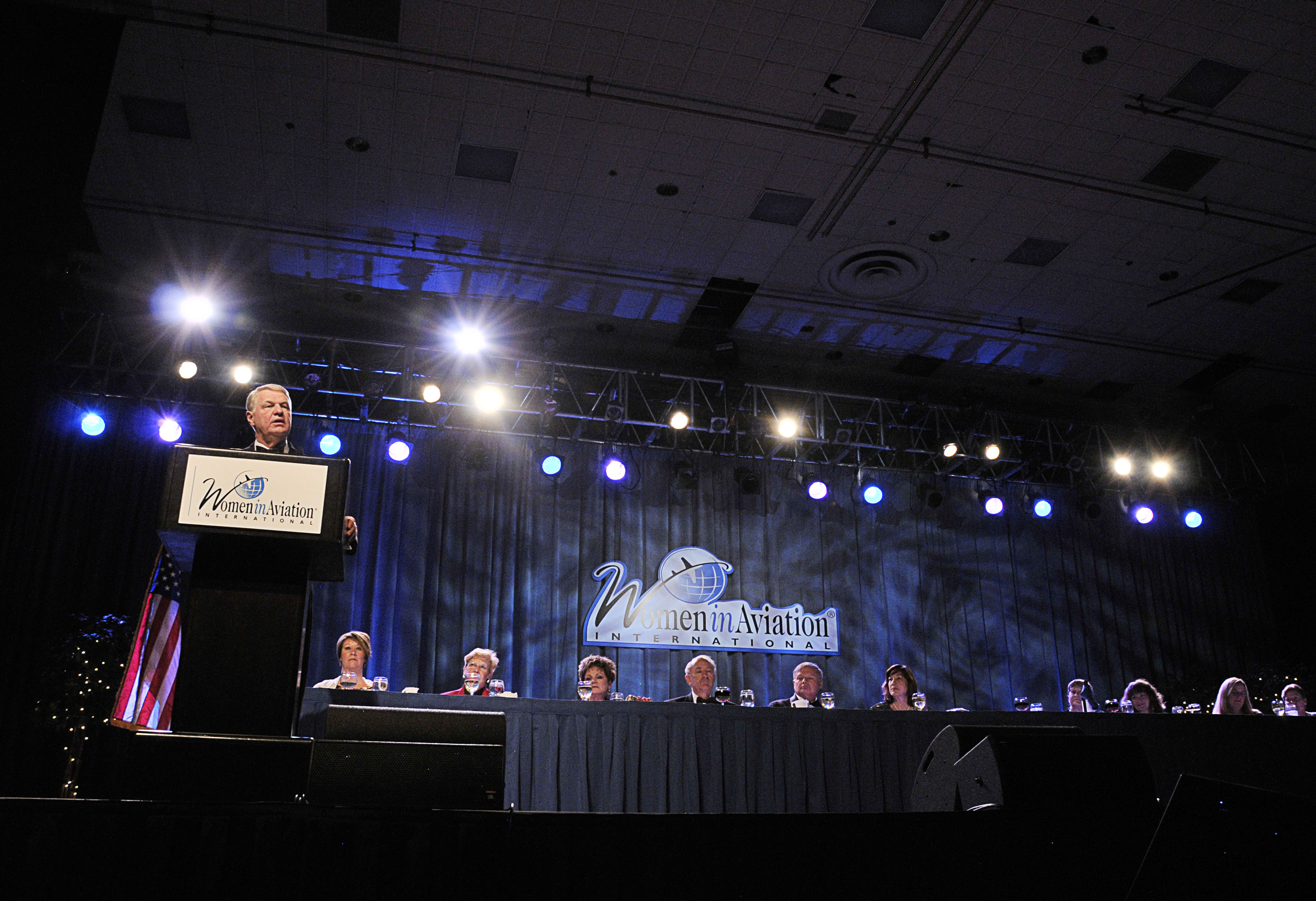
22nd Annual WAI Conference

Each year the organization hosts an annual conference, which has grown from 150 participants in 1990 to approximately 4,500 in 2023. Men are also able to join Women in Aviation International and make up approximately 20% of the membership.

The conference includes educational workshops, networking opportunities with various aspects of the aviation industry, scholarship awards and the annual WAI Pioneer Hall of Fame Induction Ceremony.

In 1996, Robin Lamar and Marcia Buckingham sponsored an organizational meeting for aviation and mechanics at the WAI annual conference, leading to the formation of a new group, called the Association for Women in Aviation Maintenance.

The organization hosted the 35th Annual Women in Aviation Conference in Orlando, FL, March 21–23, 2024.

== Girls in Aviation Day ==
In 2015, WAI launched Girls in Aviation Day observed on last Saturday of the month of September. The day is intended to interest girls, ages 8 to 17, in aviation careers. A Girl Scout patch was designed for the 2016 Girls in Aviation Day which would be given out to scouts who took part in the day's activities.

== Hall of Fame ==
The Women in Aviation International Pioneer Hall of Fame was established in 1992. Its purpose is to honor women who make significant contributions as record setters, pioneers, or innovators in the aviation and aerospace industries. WAI solicits nominations from throughout the aviation industry each year for the WAI Pioneer Hall of Fame. Inductees are chosen from the nominations by a committee, "with special consideration given to individuals who have helped other women become successful in aviation or opened doors of opportunity for other women."
