= Molly Reilly =

Canadian pilot

- Born: Moretta Fenton Beall Reilly; February 25, 1922; Lindsay, Ontario, Canada
- Died: November 24, 1980 (aged 58)
- Occupation: Aviator
- Known for: First female Canadian corporate pilot, and first female Canadian pilot to reach the rank of captain
- Spouse: Jack Reilly
- Honours: Canadian Aviation Hall of Fame

Moretta Fenton Beall "Molly" Reilly (February 25, 1922 – November 24, 1980) became the first female Canadian pilot to reach the rank of captain, the first female Canadian corporate pilot, and the first woman to fly to the Arctic professionally. Her modifications to the Beechcraft Duke were used to improve the aircraft. Over the course of her career, Reilly logged over 10,000 flight hours as a pilot-in-command — without a single accident. She is a member of the Canadian Aviation Hall of Fame.

== Early life ==
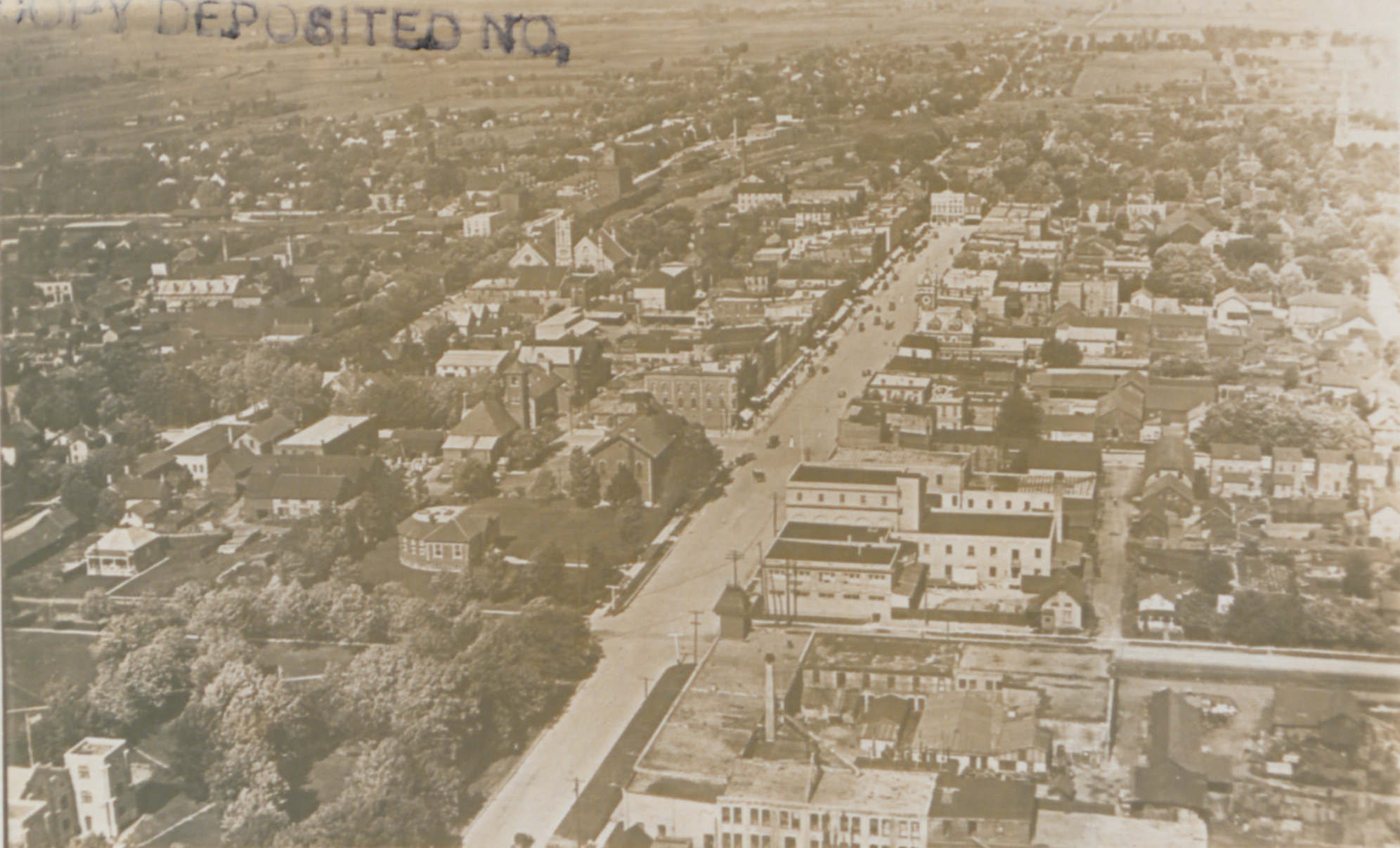
An aerial view of Lindsay, Ontario, c. 1919

Reilly was born February 25, 1922, in Lindsay, Ontario. She had seven siblings, three sisters and four brothers, at least one brother enlisted as a pilot during WWII.

== Career ==
=== World War II ===
After graduating from high school in 1940, Reilly took flying lessons at Pat Paterson's Flyers Limited School at Barker Field. One of her teachers was fellow Canadian aviator Violet Milstead. Reilly's flight training was cut short when WWII forced civilian aviators to stay grounded, so she applied to join the Royal Canadian Air Force (RCAF) in order to complete her pilot certification, but was rejected due to her gender. Although the Air Transport Auxiliary accepted women, Reilly couldn't join without her pilot's license. Determined to find a job that involved flying, in 1941 she finally enlisted with the RCAF as a photographer in the new Women's Division. She continued working as a non-commissioned officer for the RCAF until 1946.

=== Post-war era ===
In 1946, after the war ended, Reilly was finally able to finish her flight lessons, earning her private pilot's license from what would later become the Rockcliffe Flying Club in Ottawa. By 1947, she had earned her commercial flight license.

That same year, Reilly gained national media attention when she participated in the 1947 Webster Trophy aviation race. She was awarded the Sanderson Shield for placing as runner-up, finishing barely three-tenths of a point behind the first place winner.

After completing her instructor's certification, Reilly was hired as a flight instructor at the Leavens Brothers Flying School in Toronto. During her employment at the school, she continued to upgrade her aviation skills, earning multi-engine and instrument ratings at the Spartan School of Aeronautics before completing her seaplane pilot qualifications at Port Alberni.

In 1953, Reilly travelled to England to earn a senior commercial license, a public transport license, and her air transport ratings. A year later, she was hired as the chief flying instructor and charter pilot for Canadian Aircraft Renters. In 1957, she was promoted as full-time charter pilot for the company, transferred to its subsidiary Southern Provincial Airlines, becoming the first Canadian female pilot to reach the rank of captain. During her work at Southern Provincial Airlines, Reilly became the first woman to fly professionally to the Arctic, and assisted in the development of the company's air ambulance service in Eastern Canada.

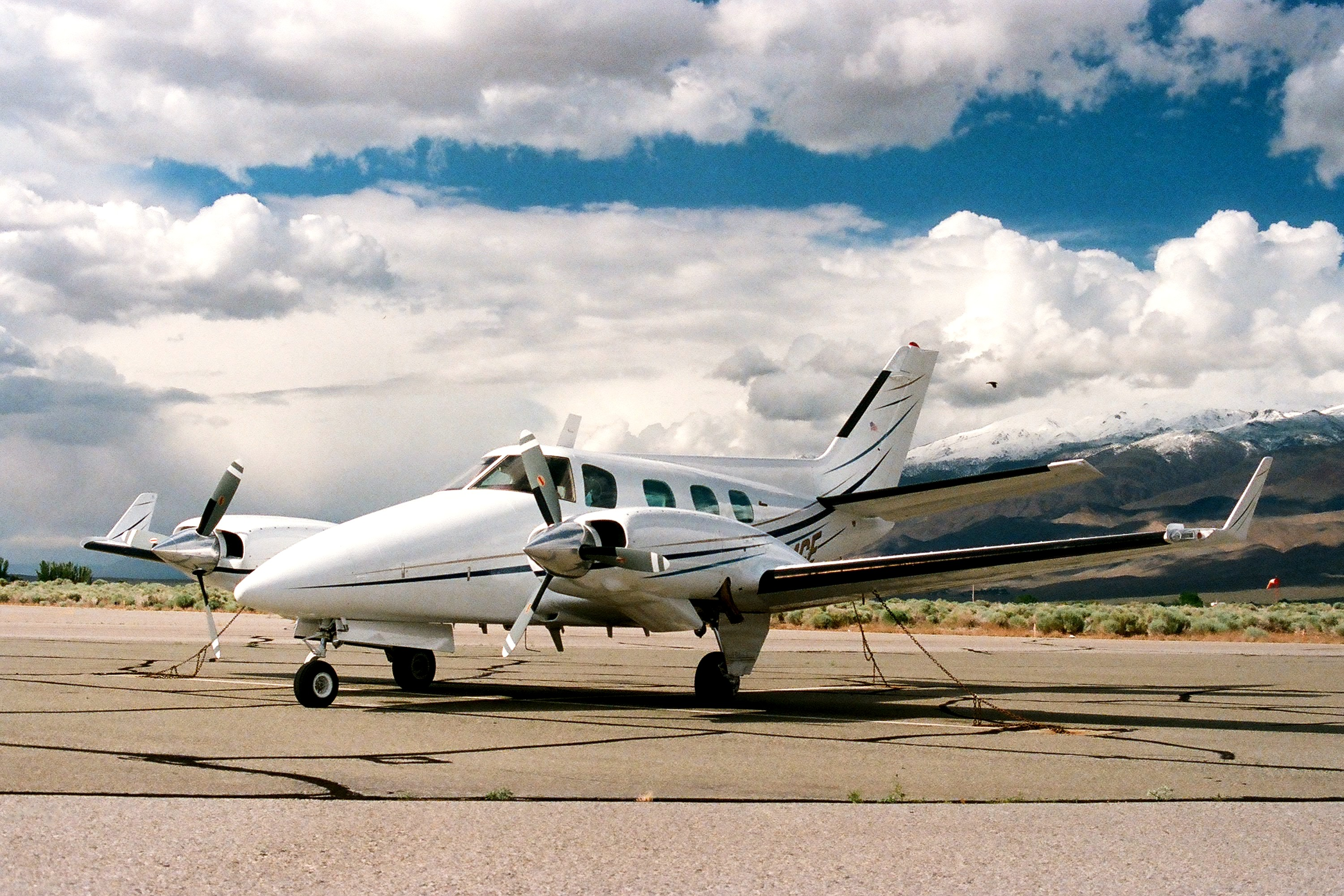
A Beechcraft Duke aircraft

Taking a new job with the Calgary company Peter Bawden Drilling in 1959, Reilly co-piloted a DC-3 airliner. She flew extensively throughout the north, piloting back and forth between major oil airfields and making runs to places such as Frobisher Bay and Resolute Bay. Reilly often dealt with extreme weather conditions, poor visibility, and few navigational aids.

In 1965, Reilly joined Canadian Coachways (later Canadian Utilities) and was hired as their chief pilot, becoming the first female corporate pilot in Canada. She flew a Beechcraft Duke throughout North America, and made modifications to the aircraft in order to fly more efficiently in the Arctic, receiving a personal commendation from the Beechcraft chairwoman Olive Beech in the process.

== Honours ==
In 1974, Reilly was inducted into the Canadian Aviation Hall of Fame.

== Personal life and death ==
In 1959, Reilly accepted a marriage proposal from pilot Jack Reilly, whom she had met through her first post-war job at the Leavens Brothers Flying School. He was her co-pilot for the DC-3 airliner at Peter Bawden Drilling.

Reilly died on November 24, 1980. By the end of her career, she had logged over 10,000 hours as a pilot-in-command, without a single accident.
