= Maureen Dunlop de Popp =

Argentine-British pilot (1920–2012)

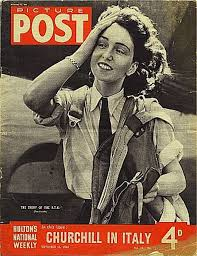
- Born: Maureen Adele Chase Dunlop; 26 October 1920; Quilmes, Argentina
- Died: 29 May 2012 (aged 91); Norfolk
- Occupation: ATA pilot
- Spouse: Şerban Victor Popp (m. 1955-2000; his death)
- Children: 3

Maureen Adele Chase Dunlop de Popp (26 October 1920 – 29 May 2012), née Dunlop, was an Anglo-Argentine pilot who flew for the British Air Transport Auxiliary (ATA) during World War II, and became notable as a pin-up on the cover of the Picture Post magazine.

== Early life ==
Dunlop was born in Quilmes, near Buenos Aires, on 26 October 1920. Her parents were Australian farm manager Eric Chase Dunlop, who had volunteered for the Royal Field Artillery during World War I and was then employed by a British company to manage 250,000 hectares (620,000 acres) of sheep farms in Patagonia, and his English wife, Jessimin May Williams. Maureen had an elder sister (Joan) and a younger brother (Eric).

Educated mainly by her governess, Dunlop also attended St Hilda's College in Hurlingham, Buenos Aires Province. Surrounded by animals, she became an expert horse rider.

During a holiday in Britain in 1936, Dunlop took flying lessons. Upon her return to Argentina, she backdated her birth certificate to allow her to continue flight training, joining the Aeroclub Argentino.

== World War II ==
At the outbreak of war, Dunlop decided actively to support the war effort. To join the Air Transport Auxiliary (ATA), women pilots needed a minimum of 500 hours' solo flying, twice that of a man. After sufficiently increasing her hours, in early 1942 Dunlop and her sister Joan travelled across the Atlantic Ocean on a neutral Argentine-registered ship.

While her sister joined the BBC, in April 1942 Maureen joined the ATA, one of 164 female pilots eventually to do so in three years. Trained to fly 38 types of aircraft, her 800 hours subsequently logged included time in Spitfires, Mustangs, Typhoons, and bomber types including the Wellington.

She later stated that her favourite type to fly was the de Havilland Mosquito. Initially attached to No.6 Ferry Pool at RAF Ratcliffe near Leicester, she then moved to the all-female Ferry Pool at Hamble, Southampton, commanded by Margot Gore, which delivered Spitfires from Supermarine's new factory at RAF Southampton.

She was forced into occasional emergency landings, once after the cockpit canopy of her Spitfire blew off after takeoff and another occasion put down in a field after the engine of her Fairchild Argus failed in the air.

Dunlop became a cover girl when pictured pushing her hair out of her face after she left the cockpit of a Fairey Barracuda aircraft. The shot featured on the front page of Picture Post magazine in 1944.

== After the war ==
At the end of hostilities, Dunlop qualified as a flying instructor at RAF Luton, before returning to Argentina. There she instructed pilots and flew for the Argentine Air Force, and also worked as a commercial pilot. Dunlop later held a partnership in an air taxi company, continuing to fly actively until 1969.

In 1955, she married retired Romanian diplomat Serban (Şerban) Victor Popp after meeting him at a British Embassy function in Buenos Aires. The couple had a son and two daughters, raised on their stud farm Milla Lauquen Stud. In 1973, the family moved to Norfolk to breed pure-blood Arab horses. Her husband died in 2000.

In 2003, Dunlop was one of three female ATA pilots who were awarded the Guild of Air Pilots and Air Navigators Master Air Pilot Award. The other two women pilots were Lettice Curtis and Diana Barnato Walker.

She died on 29 May 2012, at her home in Norfolk.

== See also ==
- List of World War I flying aces from Argentina
- English settlement in Argentina
- No. 164 Squadron RAF
