= Nancy Stratford =

American aviator (born 1919)

- Born: Nancy Jane Miller; June 12, 1919 (age 107); Los Angeles, California, U.S.
- Occupation: Pilot
- Employer: Air Transport Auxiliary

Nancy Jane Miller Livingston Stratford (born June 12, 1919) is an American aviator. She transported warplanes as a pilot in the civilian Air Transport Auxiliary (ATA) in Great Britain during World War II and was later a pioneering helicopter pilot in Alaska. She is the last surviving "Attagirl", as the women pilots of the ATA were known.

== Early life ==
Nancy Jane Miller was born in Los Angeles, California on June 12, 1919. She flew for the first time at 16 when her brother took her on a sightseeing flight over Los Angeles for her birthday. She was enchanted with flying and began studying aviation at Oakland Airport in 1939.

== Career ==
In 1942 she was engaged to be married, but wanted to join the civilian Air Transport Auxiliary (ATA), ferrying warplanes around Great Britain to supply the Royal Air Force. Her fiancé forbade her to go, so she broke off the engagement and went. She logged around 900 hours of flying and gained experience on about 50 different types of aircraft, saying that her favorite was the Supermarine Spitfire.

Returning from the war, she had trouble finding employment in the traditionally male-dominated field. In 1947, she found work with a commercial service in Oregon where she flew, taught, and did bookkeeping. The same year she earned seaplane and helicopter certifications, becoming only the fourth woman in the world licensed to fly helicopters.

In 1960, she became the first woman helicopter operator in Alaska when she and her husband, Arlo Livingston, founded Livingston Copters near Juneau. Among her passengers was mountaineer Edmund Hillary, whom she flew to Alaska's Mendenhall Glacier in 1963. The business still operates as NorthStar Helicopters.

In 1970, she was forced to give up her pilot's license due to deafness, attributed to prolonged exposure to loud engine noise.

== Later life ==
In 1978, she and her husband sold their helicopter business and moved to Washington.

After Arlo Livingston died in 1986, Stratford reconnected with a man to whom she had been engaged during the war, Milton Stratford. The two married in 1992 and moved to San Diego. Milton died in 2008.

In 2013, encouraged by her niece Peg Miller, she published a memoir titled Contact! Britain!: A Woman Ferry Pilot's Story During WWII in England.

Upon the death of Jaye Edwards in August 2022, Stratford became the last surviving "Attagirl", as the women pilots of the ATA were known. She celebrated her 106th birthday in 2025, saying that the real key to long life is "chocolate and vodka tonics".

== Honors ==
In 2008, she was presented with an Air Transport Auxiliary Veterans Badge by British prime minister Gordon Brown.

In 2015, she was recognized as an Alaskan Aviation Legend by the Alaska Air Carriers Association.
