= Spitfire (2018 film) =

- Directed by: David Fairhead; Anthony Palmer
- Produced by: David Fairhead; Anthony Palmer; Steve Milne; Gareth Dodds; John Dibbs
- Narrated by: Charles Dance
- Cinematography: John Collins; John Dibbs
- Edited by: David Fairhead
- Music by: Chris Roe
- Production companies: British Film Company; Haviland Digital; Mark Stewart Productions
- Distributed by: Gravitas Ventures
- Release date: July 15, 2018
- Running time: 97 minutes
- Country: United Kingdom
- Language: English
- Budget: £800,000
- Box office: $722,623 (worldwide)

Spitfire is a 2018 British documentary feature film about the history of the Supermarine Spitfire during World War II and its last surviving pilots. The film was released in commemoration of the centenary of the Royal Air Force and features narration by Charles Dance.

== Synopsis ==
Using archival footage and new aerial footage of surviving Spitfires filmed over southern England and the cliffs of Dover, the film traces the history of the plane's development beginning with its design inspiration from a seaplane designed by R. J. Mitchell and built by Supermarine that won the 1931 Schneider Trophy. The documentary also uses clips from the 1942 film The First of the Few in which director and lead actor Leslie Howard portrays the first Spitfire's designer R. J. Mitchell, who died in 1937 and was eventually succeeded as chief designer by Joseph Smith. The film then follows the evolving design and roles of the Spitfire through the Battle of Britain, the Siege of Malta, the Normandy landings, until its eventual retirement after the war.

The documentary interviews modern-day pilots, museum curators, and several surviving members of fighter squadrons and the air auxiliaries, such as RAF flying ace Tom Neil and Air Transport Auxiliary pilot Mary Ellis, one of the last surviving British women pilots from World War II. At the end of the film, Ellis is shown being reunited with Spitfire MV154 which bears her original signature from 1944, which she again signed on camera. Both Neil and Ellis died just days after the film's release. The film is dedicated to "the memory of the pilots of all nations who flew and fought in the Second World War."

== Release ==
The documentary held its world premiere on July 9, 2018 at the Curzon Mayfair Cinema in London as part of the 100th year celebrations of the Royal Air Force. The premiere was attended by narrator Charles Dance, TV personality Carol Vorderman (an honorary Group Captain for the RAF Air Cadets), and guest-of-honor Sqn Ldr. Alan Scott, one of the Spitfire flying aces featured in the film.

Prior to its public release, the film-makers held previews in RAF bases and in select cinemas near sites important to the Spitfire's history, such as Southampton (the site of its maiden flight and Supermarine's former factory), Stoke-on-Trent (the birthplace of R. J. Mitchell) and Solihull (near the former Castle Bromwich Aircraft Factory.)

== Reception ==
Spitfire received positive reviews. On the review aggregator Rotten Tomatoes, the film holds a 94% approval rating based on 18 reviews with an average rating of 7.0/10.

Writing for The Daily Telegraph, Tristram Fane Saunders awarded the film four out of five stars, particularly praising the interviews with the pilots that "give this film its broader purpose and appeal." Mike McCahill of The Guardian gave the film three out of five stars, lauding how the film is "guaranteed to spike the pulse rates of aeronautical enthusiasts" but criticized how it "can seem a trifle coy about addressing the consequences of combat."
