= Barnato =

Barnato is a British-Jewish surname of Italian origin. It may refer to:

- Barney Barnato (born Barnett Isaacs) (1851–1897), a South African mine owner
- Woolf Barnato (Joel Woolf "Babe" Barnato), (1895–1948), a car racer, son of Barney Barnato
- Diana Barnato Walker (1918–2008), an aviator, daughter of Woolf Barnato
