= Mary Ellis (pilot) =

British World War II ferry pilot

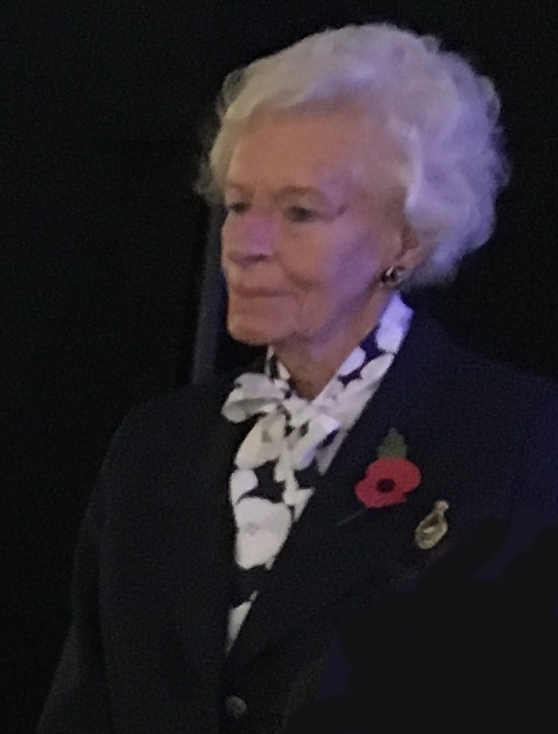
- Mary Ellis at the Royal Albert Hall for her appearance at the Royal British Legion Festival of Remembrance in November 2016
- Born: Mary Wilkins; 2 February 1917; Leafield, Oxfordshire, England
- Died: 24 July 2018 (aged 101); Sandown, Isle of Wight, England
- Occupation(s): Air Transport Auxiliary; Royal Air Force airport manager
- Known for: Aircraft pilot
- Spouse: Don Ellis (m. 1961; died 2009)

Mary Ellis (née Wilkins; 2 February 1917 – 24 July 2018) was a British ferry pilot, and one of the last surviving British female pilots from the Second World War.

== Early life ==
Mary Wilkins was born on 2 February 1917, at Langley Farm, in Leafield, Oxfordshire, The only daughter and third of four children born to Nellie, née Clarke (1885–1967) and Charles William Wilkins (1885–1972). She developed a fascination with aviation from a young age, as her family home was located near Royal Air Force bases at Bicester Airfield and Port Meadow. When she was eight, the Sir Alan Cobham Flying Circus visited the area, and she persuaded her father to pay for a joy ride in an Avro 504. She decided she wanted to learn to fly. When she was 16 she started having lessons at a flying club in Witney, successfully gained a private pilot's license and flew for pleasure until the start of the Second World War in 1939, when all civilian flying was banned.

== Second World War ==
In October 1941, she joined the Air Transport Auxiliary (ATA), and was posted to a pool of women flyers based in Hamble in Hampshire. Over the course of the war she flew over 1,000 planes of 76 different types, including Harvards, Hurricanes, Spitfires and Wellington bombers. Some of her flights were to relocate planes from Royal Air Force airfields to the frontline, and others were to ferry new planes from factories to airfields.

== Post Second World War ==
After the war the Air Transport Auxiliary was disbanded. However, Ellis was seconded to the Royal Air Force and continued to ferry aircraft. She was one of the first women to fly the Gloster Meteor, Britain's first jet fighter. She later moved to the Isle of Wight.

In 1950, she became the manager of Sandown Airport, and Europe's first female air commandant. Ellis managed Sandown for twenty years, during which time she also founded the Isle of Wight Aero Club. A former ATA colleague, Vera Strodl, was hired by Ellis as the chief flying instructor.

In 2016, Ellis published her autobiography: A Spitfire Girl: One of the World's Greatest Female ATA Ferry Pilots Tells Her Story.

== Personal life ==
She married fellow pilot Don Ellis in 1961, and they had a house next to the runway at Sandown. Don Ellis died in 2009.

Ellis died at her home in Sandown, Isle of Wight, on 24 July 2018 at the age of 101.

== Recognition and commemoration ==
In 2017 a plaque was unveiled at RAF Brize Norton in recognition of Ellis' and fellow pilot, Molly Rose's, "contribution to ATA".

In 2018, Ellis was granted the Freedom of the Isle of Wight.

Ellis was featured on the BBC in 2018 highlighting, among other achievements, solo flights where other teams consisted of eight crew. She also appeared in the documentary Spitfire that was first released on 15 July 2018, just days before her death.

In March 2022 the Oxford Dictionary of National Biography published a biography of Mary Ellis.

== Works ==
- Ellis, Mary; Foreman, Melody (2016). A Spitfire Girl: One of the World's Greatest Female ATA Ferry Pilots Tells Her Story. Havertown: Frontline Books. ISBN 9781473895393. OCLC 965167984.
