= Margot Gore =

British aviator and osteopath (1913–1993)

Margaret Gore MBE
- Gore in ATA uniform and flying helmet
- Born: 24 January 1913; Worthing, West Sussex, England
- Died: 20 August 1993 (aged 80); Nettlebed, Oxfordshire, England
- Education: Bedford High School for Girls
- Occupations: Pilot and osteopath
- Employer(s): Air Transport Auxiliary & British School of Osteopathy

Margaret Wyndham Gore MBE (24 January 1913 – 20 August 1993), known as Margot Gore, was a leading British aviator and osteopath. She was appointed MBE for her service as a commander in the Air Transport Auxiliary. She may have been the first woman to pilot a Boeing B-17 Flying Fortress. After the war she trained to be an osteopath rising to teach and then sit on the board of the British School of Osteopathy.

== Early life ==
Gore was born in Worthing in 1913, and her loves were medicine and flying. Her family moved to Ireland, where she spent her childhood running free with the local hunt and obtaining little formal education. A family maid secretly took her to view Michael Collins' body when he was laid out. When she was sixteen her family moved back to England, and at Bedford High School for Girls she realised her lack of qualifications.

== Flying career and Air Transport Auxiliary ==
Gore wanted a career in medicine but lacked the academic background. She worked as a secretary at Smithfield Market to raise money for flying lessons, and she later undertook subsidised lessons with the Civil Air Guard in 1938 as war became inevitable. She was taught to fly by Gabrielle Patterson, who encouraged her to become a qualified instructor in 1939.

In 1940 the Air Transport Auxiliary (ATA) agreed to take women pilots and recruits were gathered by Pauline Gower with an initial eight women pilots. The ATA's role was to deliver aircraft and the De Havilland Tiger Moth was the first to be entrusted to the ATA's new women pilots at Hatfield, Hertfordshire. Gore was not amongst the first eight but she was the tenth and in the next batch to be recruited in June 1940.

Gore rose to head the Hamble ATA ferry pool in 1941 with Rosemary Rees as her second in command. Ida Veldhuyzen van Zanten, the only Dutch woman pilot in the ATA, flew under her command, as did Maureen Dunlop, an Anglo Argentinian pilot. Gore was now a flight captain with all female recruits, delivering aircraft as they were manufactured to operational units around the country. She was one of eleven women to train on the Halifax bomber and she is believed to be the first woman to pilot an American Flying Fortress.

Gore was awarded an MBE in the 1944 New Year Honours for her services during the war. In 1945 she was still at Hamble. She was the first recruit to the WAAF Voluntary Reserve branch at White Waltham Airfield when it was formed in 1947.

== Later career ==
Gore still wanted to enter medicine and she studied physics, chemistry and biology in order to enter a course in Osteopathy. She was given the gold medal as the best student in 1954 after three years at the British School of Osteopathy. She went on to teach at the school and rose to be on the board of the school. In 1968 she was vice-chairman of the Osteopathic Educational Foundation. She is recognised as one of the key people who shaped the school after the war.

Gore died in Nettlebed in 1993, aged 80.
