= Violet Milstead =

Canadian aviator

Violet Milstead CM
- Born: October 17, 1919; Toronto, Ontario, Canada
- Died: June 27, 2014 (aged 94)
- Occupations: Air Transport Auxiliary pilot, bush pilot, flight instructor
- Spouse: Arnold Warren (m. 1947; died 2000)
- Honours: Member of the Order of Canada, Canadian Aviation Hall of Fame, Bush Pilots Hall of Fame

Violet Milstead Warren CM (October 17, 1919 – June 27, 2014) was a Canadian aviator, noted for being the first female Canadian bush pilot and one of only four Canadian women to work in the British Air Transport Auxiliary (ATA) during WWII. With over 600 hours of flight time during the war, she was the longest serving female Canadian ATA pilot. She worked as a flight instructor at Barker Field in Toronto, Ontario, and her students included commercial pilot Molly Reilly and author June Callwood. She is a member of the Canadian Aviation Hall of Fame, the Order of Canada, and the Bush Pilots Hall of Fame.

== Early life ==
Milstead was born October 17, 1919, in Toronto, Ontario. Her parents were Edith and Harold Milstead, and she had one brother named Fred.

Milstead was taken out of school at the age of 15 in order to help at her mother's wool shop. Although she first aspired to become a surgeon, by the time she was 16 she was determined to become a pilot instead. Milstead saved up money for flying lessons from working at her mother's shop. She took her first flying lesson on September 4, 1939. Only six months after her first flying lesson, she had earned both her private and commercial aviation licenses.

== Career ==
=== WWII ===
After completing her instructor's certification in July 1941, Milstead gave flight lessons to both military personnel and private citizens at Barker Field in Toronto. Soon, however, wartime rationing effectively ended her instructing job.

In 1943, learning that the Air Transport Auxiliary (ATA) needed experienced pilots, Milstead travelled to England with fellow aviator Marion Orr. She was one of only four Canadian women who worked at the ATA, and she earned the rank of first officer, ferrying various twin-engine aircraft between factories and military sites.

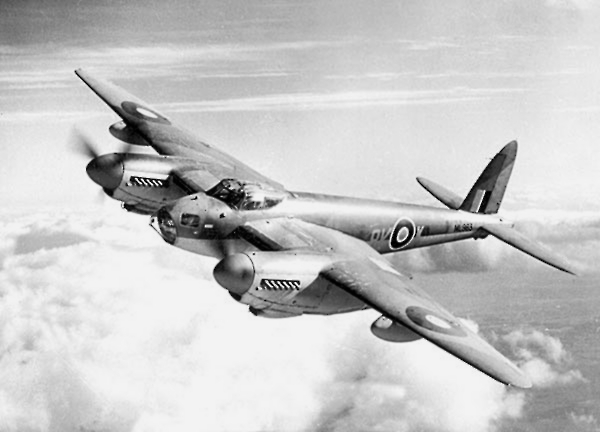
A World War II de Havilland Mosquito combat aircraft

Milstead flew at least 47 types of aircraft during her wartime ferrying work, including Spitfires, de Havilland Mosquitos, Beaufighters, Hawker Tempests and Grumman Hellcats. She had to learn the controls and system of each new aircraft rapidly, and to assist with this Milstead relied on the "Blue Bible", a book of instruction cards on the inspection, take-off and landing procedures for each type of aircraft. ATA pilots were not allowed to use radio contact during flights, due to the risk of being overheard, so Milstead often had to navigate by dead reckoning, flying through storms, smog and darkness with little more than maps and compasses. Ground crews on airfields said that they knew how to recognise ATA pilots approaching, because "no one else would dare to fly in such bad weather". Milstead worked in cycles of two weeks, with four days off for rest, and typically flew up to eight flights per day. Despite carrying the same workload as her male ATA co-workers, she was paid 20 per cent less. Just over five feet tall, Milstead sometimes had to sit atop a packaged parachute in order to see out the windows of her aircraft.

Milstead logged over 600 hours of flight time and was the longest serving female Canadian pilot with the ATA.

=== Post-war years ===
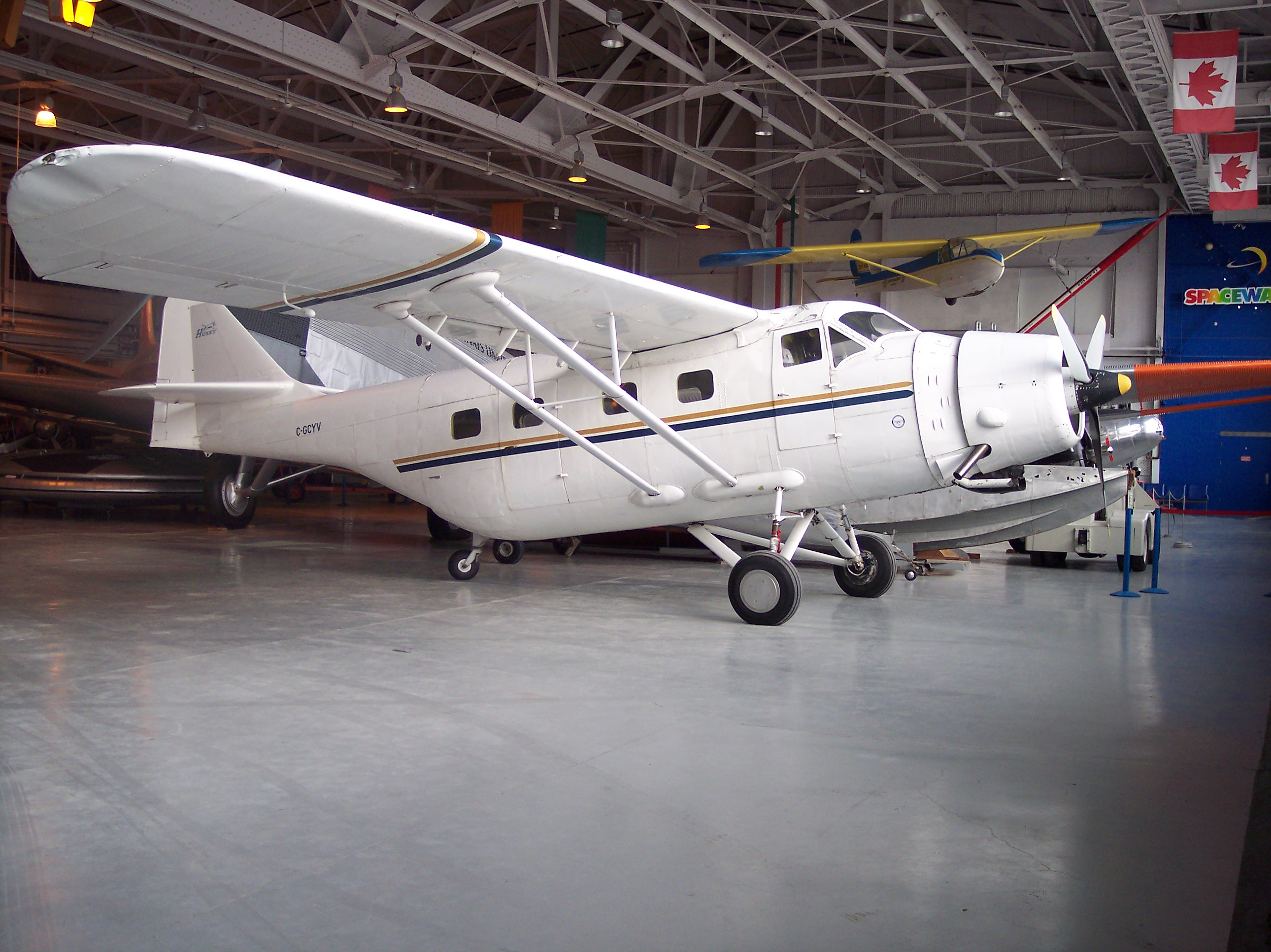
A Fairchild Husky bushplane

When the ATA was disbanded in 1945, Milstead returned to Canada and worked as a flight instructor at Leavens Brothers Air Services at Barker Field. Here, she met her future husband, pilot Arnold Warren. She moved to Sudbury next, to work at Nickel Belt Airways teaching and flying as a bush pilot. Milstead transported prospectors, miners, lumber personnel, hunters and fishermen in and out of northern Ontario, and also watched for forest fires. She was the first female Canadian bush pilot, Milstead often flew the Fairchild Husky in her bush work.

She sometimes encountered difficulties with men. In one incident, before their aircraft took off, a male co-pilot attempted to kiss her, and she "spun him around and kicked him out the door". Things improved with time, however. "When the boys got over fainting spells from seeing a girl climb out of the airplane, they became very helpful," Milstead later recalled.

Following a two-year stint in Indonesia – where Milstead's husband taught aviation but where she herself was forbidden from teaching – the couple returned to Canada, where Milstead eventually found work as a librarian at Orlenda and the Ontario Water Commission. She retired in 1973, and she and her husband continued to fly for recreation in their own Piper Cub.

Milstead taught several notable Canadians how to fly during her time as an instructor, including author June Callwood and commercial pilot Molly Reilly. Impressed by Milstead's skills, Callwood described her as a "Bush Angel", later writing an article about Milstead for a women's magazine.

== Honours ==
In 1995, Milstead was chosen to enter the Bush Pilots Hall of Fame. A year later, a documentary called A Time For Courage was produced about Milstead's ATA work by Cooper Rock Pictures.

In 2004, Milstead was awarded the Order of Canada, and in 2009, a special Canada Post stamp was issued with her image on it. In 2012 she received the Queen's Diamond Jubilee Medal. Her other awards include the Amelia Earhart Medal, the Paul Harris Medal, and the Rusty Blakey Memorial Award.

In 2010, she was inducted into the Canadian Aviation Hall of Fame.

== Personal life and death ==
Milstead married pilot Arnold Warren in 1947, and they stayed together until Warren's death in 2000.

She died on June 27, 2014.
