= Trevor Hunter =

New Zealand aviator

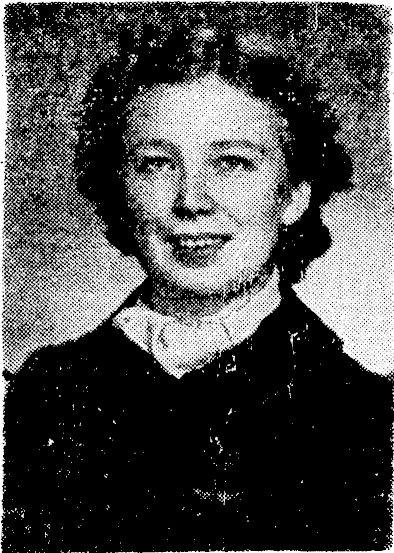
- Born: Trevor Hunter; 25 January 1915; Whanganui
- Died: 8 May 2002 (aged 87)
- Spouse: James Colway
- Aviation career
- Flight license: 1933
- Air force: Royal air force
- Rank: First officer

Trevor Hunter (25 January 1915 – 8 May 2002) was a New Zealand aviator. She accompanied Ted Harvie on his record-breaking flight from North Cape to Bluff in December 1933. She was the first of five New Zealand women accepted to fly with the Air Transport Auxiliary during the Second World War. During her four years in the ATA, she logged 1,200 hours of solo flying and flew 42 types of aircraft.

== Early life ==
Trevor Hunter was born in Whanganui on 25 January 1915 to Wynnie and Marmaduke Archer Hunter. She was named Trevor as her mother was sure that the baby would be a boy. As a child she was a keen ballet dancer and developed a career teaching dance.

She was a member of the Whanganui Aero club and gained her 'A' license in 1933, flying solo at age 16. Hunter was also the secretary of the Aero Club.

At the age of 18, she flew with Ted Harvie on his flight from North Cape to Bluff which, at 1,880 kilometres (1,170 mi), was the longest recorded flight in New Zealand at the time. The record lasted 28 years.

On 21 July 1934, she was one of the four female pilots (alongside Jane Winstone, June Summerell and Eva Parkinson) who flew in formation with Jean Batten on her arrival to New Zealand following Batten's record breaking solo flight from Britain in 1934.

== Air Transport Auxiliary ==
In 1941, Hunter was the first New Zealand woman pilot to join the Air Transport Auxiliary (ATA) ring the Second World War. Like other women from New Zealand who joined the ATA, she had to pay her way to Britain to be examined. She was enlisted in the Ferry Service and flew planes from the factories to squadron bases. During her four years in the ATA (20 November 1941 - 31 July 1945) she logged 1,200 hours of solo flying and flew 42 types of aircraft including Spitfires, Warwicks, Mitchells and Wellingtons. Hunter was involved in 6 accidents during her time at the ATA, including three forced landings. Only the first accident was judged to be her fault.

== Later life ==
After the war, Hunter was employed as a commercial pilot. She also sat Intermediate grade ballet examinations in Sydney, and taught ballet and ballroom dancing in Wanganui until she retired.

In 1950, she married a journalist, James Colway, and became known as Trevor Colway. She gave up flying when pregnant in 1952. Her husband became the editor of the Whanganui Chronicle from 1964.

On 3 December 1983, a re-enactment of the North Cape to Bluff flight was staged by Ted Harvie’s nephew, Don Haggitt. Both Trevor Colway and Harvie met him in Invercargill on his arrival.

Trevor Colway died on 8 May 2002.
