= Jane Winstone =

New Zealand aviator (1912–1944)

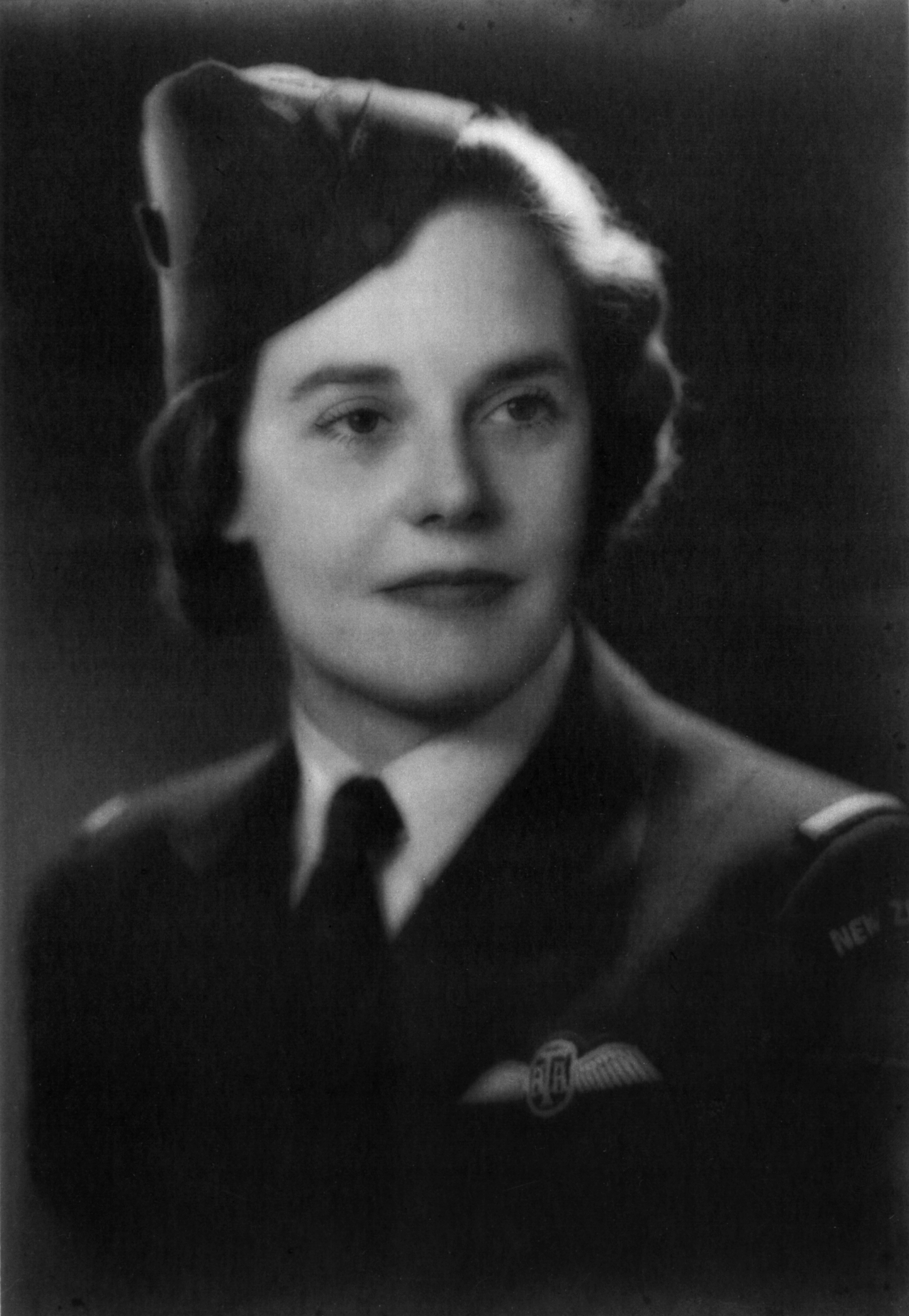
- Winstone, c. 1943
- Born: Jane Winstone; 24 September 1912; Whanganui
- Died: 10 February 1944 (aged 31)
- Cause of death: Engine failure
- Resting place: Maidenhead Cemetery, Berkshire, England
- Education: Sacred Heart College
- Aviation career
- Flight license: 1928
- Air force: Air Transport Auxiliary
- Rank: Pilot Second Officer

Jane Winstone (24 September 1912 – 10 February 1944) was a New Zealand aviator. She was born in Whanganui, New Zealand in 1912 and flew in the Second World War as a pilot in the British civilian Air Transport Auxiliary and died in service.

== Early life ==
Jane Winstone was born to Lina Storme (née Clapham) and chemist Arthur Winstone on 24 September 1912 in Whanganui, New Zealand. She had two younger sisters and was raised and educated in Whanganui. She attended the Sacred Heart school there, and learned to fly while still a student. At one time the youngest female solo pilot in New Zealand, Winstone first obtained her pilot's license at the age of 16.

== Flying career ==
A charter member of the Whanganui Aero Club, she also was one of those aboard the first flight from Whanganui's airport. After flying in Charles Kingsford Smith's Southern Cross, she was one of the four female pilots (alongside Trevor Hunter, June Summerell and Eva Parkinson) to escort New Zealand aviator Jean Batten on 21 July 1934 in her arrival in New Zealand following her record flight from England to Australia.

Winstone applied to be a pilot for the Air Transport Auxiliary while living in New Zealand and they informed her she would be considered if she was able to be examined in Britain. She paid for her own passage to Britain to be able to sit the examination and flying test and passed with excellence. Her fiancé, Angus Carr MacKenzie, who was a Royal New Zealand Air Force officer, had died on air operations in June 1942. Winston joined the ATA on 19 August 1942. Once enlisted she was assigned to Ferry Service and flew Hurricanes and Spitfires to deliver them to pilots on bases.

Winstone was given the rank of Second Pilot Officer and was based at 12 Ferry Pool in Cosford, Shropshire. She died in service on 10 February 1944 when her Spitfire LF.1X MK616's Merlin engine failed and the aircraft crashed near Tong Castle, in Shropshire. She had been transporting the plane from the Vickers Aircraft factory at Cosford to the RAF 39 Maintenance Unit at Colerne, Wiltshire. The engine had cut out three times at takeoff.

Jane Winstone's funeral was held at St Joseph's Church, Maidenhead, and she was buried in All Saints Cemetery in Maidenhead.

== Honours and legacy ==
In 2006, a retirement village built on St. John's Hill in Whanganui was named in Winstone's honor; it is called Jane Winstone Retirement Village.
