= Annette Elizabeth Mahon =

Irish pilot (1918-2013)

- Nickname: Queen of the Barracudas
- Born: Annette Elizabeth Mahon; 21 October 1918; Dublin, Ireland
- Died: 7 October 2013 (aged 94) Basingstoke, England
- Allegiance: United Kingdom
- Service: Air Transport Auxiliary
- Service years: 1944–45
- Rank: Third officer
- Service number: W.164
- Known for: Only Irish woman to fly with the Air Transport Auxiliary
- Conflicts: Second World War
- Spouse: Samuel 'Maurice' B Hill
- Children: 3

Annette Elizabeth Mahon (married name Annette Elizabeth Hill; 21 October 1918 – 7 October 2013) was a pioneering pilot and the only Irish woman member of the Air Transport Auxiliary.

== Life ==
Annette Elizabeth Mahon was born in Dublin on 21 October 1918. She was one of six children. Her father worked in the Post Office. Mahon attended a Sacred Heart convent in Dublin and went on to get a job with an accountancy firm until the war. During her childhood in Dublin there had been a visit from Sir Alan Cobham's Flying Circus and Mahon had taken a ride and for a moment been given control of the airplane. When the war began Mahon moved to Northern Ireland to drive ambulances with the Women's Auxiliary Air Force in Ulster. There she heard about the Air Transport Auxiliary and in 1942 she applied for the ATA pilot training. She was accepted and was sent to the Elementary Flying Training School at Prestwick in Scotland. She was posted to Prestwick once training was complete and ferried planes around the north of Scotland. She gained the name “Queen of the Barracudas” when she began flying Fairey Barracudas regularly after they entered service in 1943. She was very fond of the aircraft. During the war she flew 12 different aircraft, including Spitfires and got 475 hour flying time. Although Mahon predominately worked as a stay at home mother after the war, in 1973 she volunteered with the group that became the Royal International Air Tattoo at Fairford, Gloucestershire.

== Personal life ==
She met her husband, Dr Maurice Hill while in Prestwick. She became ill with influenza and being in a foreign country she had no one to look after her. Hill took care of her for the duration and she later took him flying in her Barracuda and told him he was going to marry her. They were married in 1947 in London. Hill took a job with the Atomic Energy Authority so Mahon moved around the UK with him from Cumbria to Caithness and Hampshire. They had three daughters though one, Elizabeth, died young in 1966. Her husband had a stroke and died in 1996. Mahon died 7 October 2013.
