= Margot Duhalde =

Chilean aviator (1920–2018)

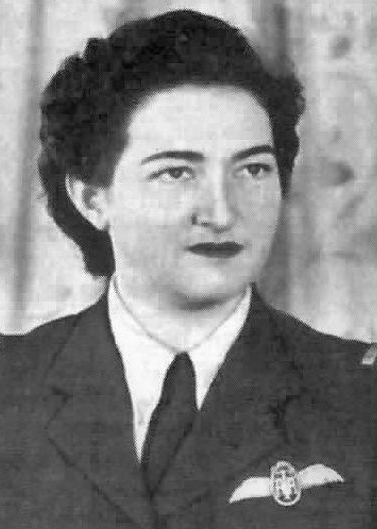
Margot Duhalde ATA, c. 1944

Margot Duhalde Sotomayor (12 December 1920 – 5 February 2018) was a Chilean pilot who served with the Air Transport Auxiliary in World War II. She was Chile's first female military pilot and first female air traffic controller, and the last living Chilean veteran of the war.

== World War II ==
Duhalde learned to fly with the Air Club of Chile in Santiago. At the outbreak of World War II, Duhalde volunteered with a French-Chilean group and travelled by ship to Europe with the intention of joining the French Free Forces as a pilot. She arrived in Liverpool, England, in April 1941, and was initially detained in jail in London for five days as a suspected spy. Upon her release, she was informed that the French Free Forces did not accept women pilots, and she was instead assigned domestic work and kitchen chores. She subsequently learned that the Air Transport Auxiliary, an organisation responsible for transporting aircraft, was willing to accept female ferry pilots, and she applied to join.

Although she spoke almost no English, she was trained as a transport pilot to enable her to fly both single and twin-engine aircraft, and both British and American machines. Over the next four years, Duhalde moved more than 900 aircraft, of 70 different types, from English bases to combat zones in France, Belgium and the Netherlands. She rose to become a first officer in the ATA.

== Post-war ==
After the war, in 1945, Duhalde flew warplanes for the French Air Force. She was France's first female combat pilot. She served as a transport pilot for the French, based in Meknes, Morocco. In 1946, the French asked her to complete a tour of South America demonstrating French aircraft; she travelled to Uruguay, Argentina, Brazil and Chile.

She returned to Chile in 1947; however, the national airline LAN did not hire women as pilots at that time. Instead, she took a job as a private pilot for a prominent businessman until 1949. She later opened her own flying school and worked as a flight instructor and as an air traffic controller in the air force. She was Chile's first female air traffic controller, and continued until she was 81 years old. Duhalde died in Santiago at the age of 97 on 5 February 2018.

== Honours and awards ==
In 1946 Duhalde was made a Knight of the Legion of Honour, and in 2007 she was made a Commander of the National Order of the Legion of Honour. In 2009 Duhalde received the Veteran's Badge from the British ambassador in Santiago, Howard Drake, for her work with the Air Transport Auxiliary during World War II.

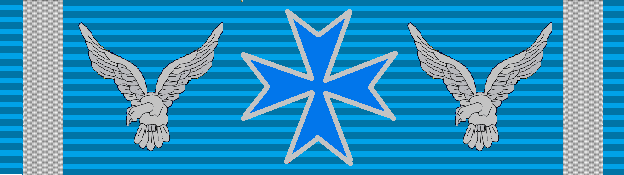
- Aeronautical Merit Cross of Chile
- Knight of the Legion of Honour
- Commander of the Legion of Honour
- Defence Medal
- War Medal 1939-1945
- Santos Dumont`s Merit Medal
