= Carol Gould (writer) =

American writer and broadcaster (1953–2021)

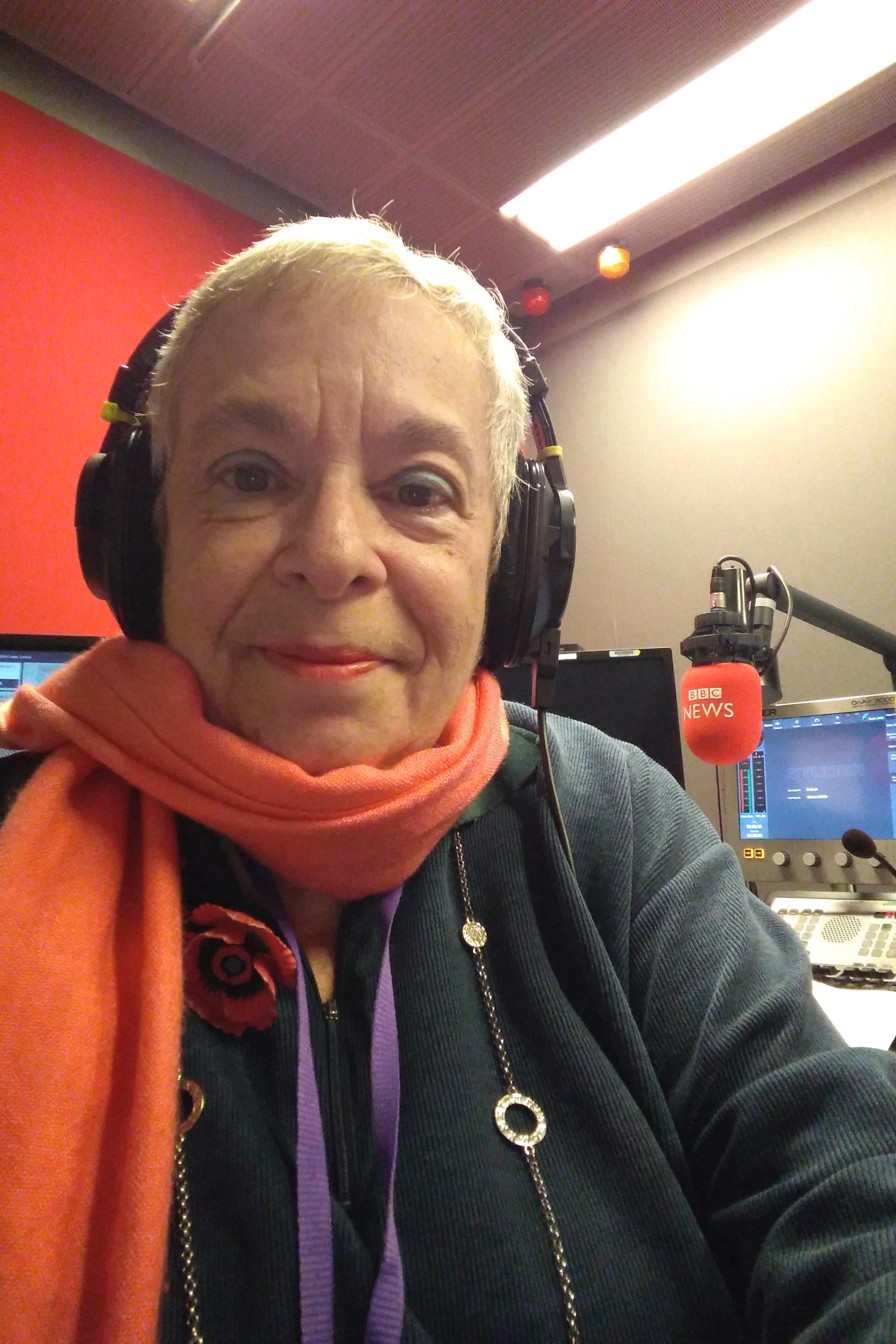
- Gould in a BBC radio studio in 2018
- Born: 19 September 1953; Philadelphia, Pennsylvania, United States
- Died: 25 November 2021 (aged 68); Paddington, London, England
- Occupations: Writer, broadcaster

Carol Gould (19 September 1953 – 25 November 2021) was an American writer and broadcaster who lived in England.

From the mid-2000s she regularly appeared as a commentator on radio and television news channels.

== Education and career ==
Born in Philadelphia, U.S., Gould attended the Philadelphia High School for Girls and Temple University, where she was elected Phi Beta Kappa. She moved to the university's London campus in 1976 where she studied documentary film history with Edgar Anstey, followed by postgraduate research at University of Kent on the history of Joan Littlewood's Theatre Workshop.

Her first plays, Virgo Rising and Barking to the Angel, were produced in London in 1977. Further plays followed, and in 1980 her play A Chamber Group, about a contemporary music ensemble, was performed at the Edinburgh Festival.

In 1981, she became Associate Head of Drama at Anglia Television, working with John Rosenberg and Sir John Woolf for the next ten years as commissioning editor and associate producer/script editor for international drama, including co-productions with PBS. Her credits include the later series of Tales of the Unexpected, a television version of Cause Célèbre by Sir Terence Rattigan, six six-hour P. D. James thrillers, and adaptations of Somerset Maugham and Eric Ambler.

Sir John Woolf, executive director, was resolute in his opposition to optioning any books by P.D. James or committing backing to a television series. He thought her books were dreary. Gould spent several sessions with him urging a change of mind because she saw a series as an international hit and the proposed leading actor, Roy Marsden, as a future star. Sir John relented, got Board backing, and the acquisition of rights by Gould resulted in six world-acclaimed series based on the James books and Marsden as Inspector Dalgliesh being catapulted to stardom, the programmes selling to sixty-five countries. Phyllis James attended every location shoot with Gould, talking well into the wee hours, and the six Anglia series made P.D. James a household name. Tales of the Unexpected had run out of stories when Gould joined Anglia Television but she canvassed every literary agent in the UK and found enough stories, by Wolf Mankowitz, Antonia Fraser and other writers, to fill a further three years of the series, which continued to sell to one-hundred countries. Classic episodes of the Gould-commissioned series are still being broadcast in the UK and around the world.

A proposal for a drama series Spitfire Girls based on the women pilots of the World War II Air Transport Auxiliary won the enthusiastic support of Sir John, with actors including Janet Suzman and writers including Peter Nichols, Shelagh Delaney, and Tom Kempinski interested in becoming involved, the latter even braving his severe agoraphobia to come in to London to discuss the project. However incoming Anglia drama executive Graeme MacDonald found the theme uninspiring, and in 1988 development was cancelled. Gould was allowed to retain the rights in her treatment for the series, and attracted the keen interest of Ros de Lanerolle of the Women's Press. But the company moved away from publishing fiction, and it was finally in 1998 that Spitfire Girls appeared as a hardback novel published by Black Ace Books. A paperback edition by Random House followed in 2009. The book was optioned the next year by Sally Head Productions, but to date remains unproduced.

The Broadcasting Act 1990 changed the environment at Anglia. Gould was head-hunted by Joop van den Ende's JE Entertainment; but when the company exited UK production in 1992, she returned to her first interest, documentary film-making. Her feature-length first film, Long Night's Journey Into Day, explored the volatile reactions in Israel after the 1995 assassination of Yitzhak Rabin, premiering at the 1997 Berlin International Film Festival. Since then she has made 15 documentaries in Britain and South Africa, including films about South African émigrés from Apartheid who found a life in London (An African in London); black GIs in Britain during World War II; entertainers during the Blitz; the Bevin Boys; Jewish evacuees during the Second World War; and wartime African-American "GI babies".

On 10 May 2021, Gould was the subject of a Daily Telegraph feature her work on the long-running Anglia Television 'Tales of the Unexpected' series.

=== Political commentator ===
A comment feature for The Guardian in 2004 about her encounters with US-hatred in Britain led to her being invited onto the BBC's flagship Radio 4 political discussion programme, Any Questions? with Jonathan Dimbleby, which in turn led to further appearances on radio and television as a political commentator, usually to give views on American politics and/or the Middle East, and sometimes on wider UK and American culture. Gould was a vocal critic of what she saw as increasing anti-Americanism and antisemitism in Britain, and expanded on her views in her book Don't Tread on Me, published in 2009 by the Social Affairs Unit in the UK and Encounter Books in the US. Her views have not always made her popular, and in July 2011 she and a fellow guest Jonathan Freedland were repeatedly disrupted and shouted down, when arguing against the cultural boycotting of Israel in a debate being held as part of the South Bank Literature Festival. She also gave regular guest lectures for Meretz UK, and was a guest speaker and lecturer for YouGovStone, Manchester University, the Council of Christians and Jews, the United Nations Association UK, the British-American Project, and the Benjamin Franklin House. For the American Women Lawyers in London Gould chaired the 'Eve of 2016 US presidential election debate' at the campus of Notre Dame University in London between Dr Jan Halper-Hayes for the Republicans and Salli Anne Swartz for the Democrats. The event was heated with a large, combative audience. In 2015, the London branch of the United Nations Association asked Gould to deliver the Hebrew prayer at its 70th Anniversary Commemorative Service at the Temple Church London.

Amongst many other radio and television appearances, and articles written for major UK papers, Gould appeared again on the BBC Radio 4's Any Questions programme as a panellist, and was a witness on The Moral Maze in an episode discussing the moral vision of America in the run-up to the 2016 U.S. Presidential Election. As a political commentator she has made regular appearances as a guest of Emma Barnett and Jeremy Vine for the BBC, on the Sky News Press Preview programme, and on Nick Ferrari, Andrew Castle and Matt Frei's programmes on LBC radio. She has also been a frequent guest for both LBC and the BBC in their coverage of the Academy Awards, correctly predicting the success of The Shape of Water for Best Picture on Oscar evening 2018, much to the astonishment of LBC host Alex Salmond.

In November 2020, Gould joined Respectability.org , a Washington-based disability magazine, as London correspondent.

In July 2021, Gould re-joined the BBC NewsUK/BBC World News roster of live newspaper analysts. She will be delivering a lecture to the Benjamin Franklin House London in the autumn about Franklin's astonishing immune system in an era of epidemics.

== Personal life ==
Gould's father Oscar was Chief of the US Army Corps of Engineers Marine Design Division (CEMDC) in Philadelphia from 1969 to 1990 and after retirement was Consultant to the International Cargo Gear Bureau. He was honoured after his death by the Department of the Army with a plaque at the US Customs House in Philadelphia.

Her mother Kay (née Karash) was a social worker fighting for the rights of impoverished black residents of the Philadelphia ghettoes in the 1930s and during World War II served as a US Army recruitment officer. Gould's play A Room at Camp Pickett, performed at the Africa Centre in London in 2004 centred on Kay Karash's establishment of a Music Room at Camp Pickett, Virginia, her objection to segregation of black and white troops, and a German POW who fell in love with her. Gould is now writing the play as her second novel.

Gould was one of eighteen women who developed complications and were allegedly misdiagnosed with breast cancer at the hands of Harley Street surgeon Owen Gilmore. Unlike the case of surgeon Ian Paterson, who was jailed in 2017 for twenty years, Gilmore was excused from trial due to illness, one of scores of doctors allowed to voluntarily remove themselves from the medical register rather than face investigations into their fitness to practise.

In November 2016, Gould was diagnosed with Stage IV metastasized triple-negative breast cancer, and given six months to live. After intravenous chemotherapy the situation was not improving, but participation in the Royal Marsden / Institute of Cancer Research plasmaMATCH trial revealed she was one of a tiny cohort of patients with a rare HER2 receptor mutation. She was placed in a trial of the drug Neratinib and as of June 2019 the tumours had stabilised, although she later had to be switched to alternate chemotherapy due to side-effects.

Gould was married to the actor Barry Philips (1946–2018) from 1980 to 1987. Her sister Susan Gould is a musicologist and opera coach based in Philadelphia.

=== Death ===
After suffering a fall, Gould was admitted to hospital in Paddington on 11 November 2021, where she tested positive for COVID-19. She died on 25 November 2021, at the age of 68.

== Awards ==
- Sid Roberts Award 1985 for the Anglia TV series Menace Unseen - Script Editor
- Royal Television Society Nomination 1991 - Anglia Films series The Chief - Script Editor

Gould was a member of BAFTA since 1987 and served on the Jury of the Prix Italia, and on the Screenplay Jury at BAFTA during her time at Anglia TV.

In December 2020, Gould was inducted into the Court of Honour of Distinguished Daughters of the academically prestigious Philadelphia High School for Girls; she joined the ranks of other recipients: women's rights lawyer Gloria Allred Gloria Allred; Helene Hanff, author of '84 Charing Cross Road' Helene Hanff and Barbara Harris, Bishop of Washington DC Barbara Harris (bishop).
