= Eleanor Wadsworth =

- Born: October 15, 1917; Nottingham, England
- Died: December 21, 2020 (aged 103); Suffolk, England
- Occupations: Pilot, architect
- Military career
- Allegiance: United Kingdom
- Branch: Royal Air Force

Eleanor Wadsworth (née Fish; 15 October 1917 – 21 December 2020) was an English Second World War pilot, who served as one of the RAF's "Spitfire women". Wadsworth was one of the last surviving pilots of the Air Transport Auxiliary (ATA) before her death in December 2020.

Eleanor Fish was born in Nottingham in 1917, the daughter of George Fish, who ran a construction business in the city, and Dorothy. She was educated at Nottingham Girls' High School, where she liked drawing. She trained as an architect in Nottingham and began working for the Air Transport Auxiliary in 1943, through which she met Bernard Wadsworth, a flight engineer. They married in 1945, and were together until his death in 2015.

== Career ==
Wadsworth began her career at the ATA as an architectural assistant. In 1943 Wadsworth responded to an advert for people with no flying experience to train to become pilots for the ATA. Aged 25, she passed the medical examination and was accepted into the programme. She began her training in the ATA Initial Flying Training School at Thame in Oxfordshire.

The programme included meteorological training, learning the internal combustion, different engines and navigation. Following only 12 hours of flight training Wadsworth was proficient to fly her first aircraft.

From June 1943 to September 1945, Wadsworth flew 22 different types of aircraft, including the Hawker Hurricane and Spitfire. Her favourite aircraft to fly was the Spitfire, which she flew over 130 times. Throughout the war she was posted at several of ATA's 14 ferry pools, earning her a Class 3 licence allowing her to fly light twin-engine aircraft. Wadsworth was among 165 other women who flew without radios or instrument flying instructions during the second world war. She completed 590 flying hours, 430 of which were solo.

Female ATA pilots during this time experienced equal pay and conditions to male pilots.

== Life after the war ==
Wadsworth piloted her final flight on 21 September 1945, and never piloted an aircraft again after the war. After the war she married Bernard, an ATA flight engineer and they had two children, George and Robert. When her boys finished school she returned to her architectural career at Greene King in Bury St Edmunds for fifteen years before retiring.

Wadsworth died aged 103 in December 2020 in Bury St Edmunds, Suffolk after a short illness.
