= Margaret Frost =

Margaret Frost (26 November 1920 – 4 August 2014) was one of 168 women who served as Spitfire pilots in the Air Transport Auxiliary during World War II. She was also the focus of the BBC documentary Spitfire Women.

== Early life ==
She was born in Kingston by Sea, Sussex, England. Her parents were Olive Jessie Frost (née Thornton) and Ernest Isaac Frost, a country parson of private means. She had a brother, Ernest Julian, called Bobby.

Frost was schooled by a private governess from the age of five until she convinced her parents to send her to boarding school in Bognor Regis when she was eight and a half. When she was 10, her mother took up flying as a hobby at Shoreham field. She started saving all her pocket money as a 10-year-old to fly. Frost got her school certificate at 15, but did not matriculate.

== Flying career ==
When the Second World War broke out, Frost applied for subsidized flying lessons but had to wait until she was 18, in November 1938. By then, she had to wait until April 1939. She earned an A license for 15 hours in the air, with five solo. She joined the Civil Air Force in 1939

She wanted to get into the Air Transport Auxiliary's women's ferry pool, but was turned down, so she joined the WRENS. She later applied again, but was told at first that she was too short at 5'3", given the 5'4" requirement, although the authorities relented. But then she ran into health problems and had to delay her training. Eventually, Frost joined the Air Transport Auxiliary on 25 November 1942. She finished her training on a Spitfire and became a ferry pilot. By the time she left the ATA on 30 September 1945, she had flown 537 hours in 22 types of singles and 67 hours in two types of twins.

== Later life ==
After the war, Frost worked for the Ministry of Defence, eventually settling in Wales. She died in Aberystwyth in 2014.
