= Marion Alice Orr =

Canadian aviator (1918–1995)

Marion Alice Orr CM
- Born: Marion Alice Powell; 25 June 1918; Toronto, Ontario, Canada
- Died: 4 April 1995 (aged 76); Peterborough, Ontario, Canada
- Occupation(s): Aviator and instructor
- Known for: Pioneer female aviator
- Spouse: D.K. "Deke" Orr

Marion Alice Orr, CM (née Powell; 25 June 1918 – 4 April 1995) was a pioneering Canadian aviator who was the first woman to run a flying school. She served with the Air Transport Auxiliary during World War II and was awarded the Order of Canada in 1986.

== Early life ==
Orr was born Marion Alice Powell in Toronto, Ontario. On 5 January 1940, she obtained her private pilot's licence after working to pay for her flying lessons. She then worked as an aircraft inspector at de Havilland Canada, and qualified for her commercial licence two years afterwards. She was the second woman in Canada to qualify as an air traffic control assistant. In 1942 she married D.K. "Deke" Orr. He helped her gain her instructor's licence in 1942. The marriage was brief and the couple separated later that year, although Marion Orr, as she was now known, would keep her married surname.

== World War II ==
After being told about the Air Transport Auxiliary (ATA) by Violet Milstead, she applied, was tested in Montreal and was admitted to the ATA. Orr and Milstead moved to England in the summer of 1942. Orr officially joined the ATA on 5 April 1943. Her first flight for the ATA was on 2 June 1943. Her favourite aircraft to fly was the Spitfire, which she considered "the most beautiful plane ever built."

She began her career ferrying airplanes across the Atlantic, according to her citation for the Order of Canada. The Maidenhead Heritage Centre, the Spiritual Home of the ATA, and the Royal Air Force Museum report that no ATA pilot ferried aircraft across the Atlantic. Her ATA record card in the RAF Museum shows she flew about 15 aircraft types, including the Airspeed Oxford, the only twin-engine machine. None of these types was capable of flying the Atlantic. Instead, she flew aircraft to and from factories, squadrons and other units.

She was honourably discharged from the ATA with the rank of second officer in September 1944 with 700 logged hours.

== Post-war career, life and honours ==
Orr assumed the responsibility of Aero Activities Limited at Barker Field in 1947 and two years later acquired the company starting her own flying school in 1949. She was forced to close at Barker Field because the airfield was sold for developed purpose; Aero Activities Limited was relocated to Maple, Ontario where she had to get permission from the Prime Minister Louis St. Laurent to open her own airfield, Maple Airport.

She was awarded the Ninety-Nines Inc. Medallion in 1976 in recognition of her outstanding achievements in the field of aviation. In 1981 Orr was named a member of Canada's Aviation Hall of Fame. During her career she flew over 21,000 hours, 17,000 hours as an instructor on single and twin-engine aircraft, on wheels, skis and floats, and helicopters. She also taught around 5000 people to fly. As one of Canada's most distinguished pilots, she was made a Member of the Order of Canada in 1993.

Marion Orr continued to fly until her deteriorating health saw her licence revoked in 1994. She died in 1995 in an automobile accident.

== See also ==
- History of aviation in Canada
