= Ida Veldhuyzen van Zanten =

Dutch resistance fighter (1911–2000)

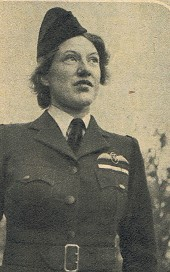
- Born: 22 June 1911; Hillegom, Netherlands
- Died: 19 October 2000 (aged 89); Emmen, Netherlands
- Occupations: Air Transport Auxiliary pilot, social worker

Ida Laura Veldhuyzen van Zanten (22 June 1911 – 19 October 2000) was a Dutch pilot and social worker who was a member of the Dutch resistance during the Second World War and a pilot in the British Air Transport Auxiliary. She was the only woman to receive the Vliegerkruis, the Airman's Cross.

== Early life and education ==
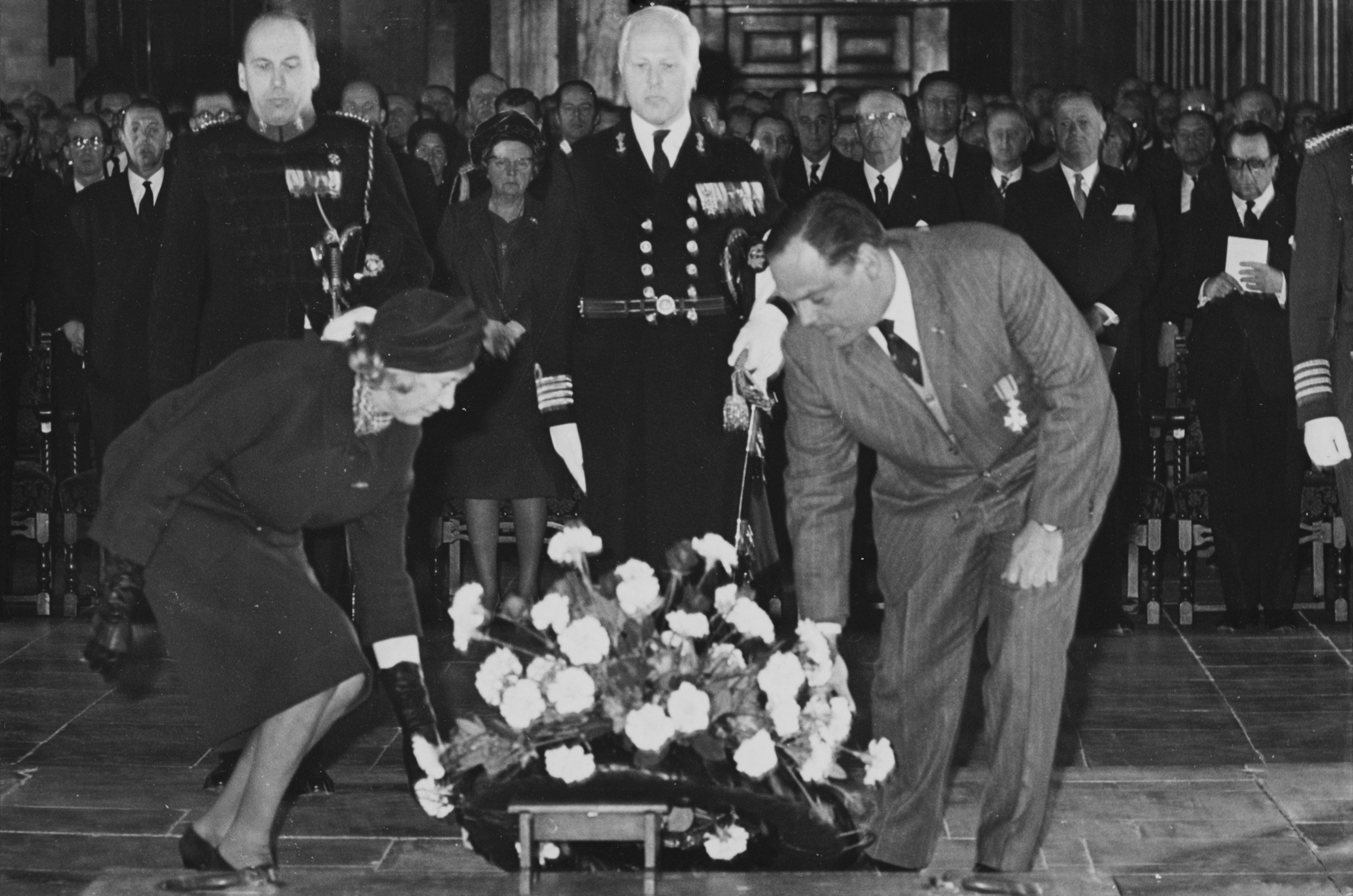
Wreath laying on behalf of the Engelandvaarders by Ida Veldhuyzen van Zanten and Peter Tazelaar during the internment of Queen Wilhelmina in the Nieuwe Kerk in Delft.

Ida Laura Veldhuyzen van Zanten was born in Hillegom on 22 June 1911 and grew up with six brothers. Her father was a bulb grower and the family business still exists as Royal Van Zanten. She attended a boarding school in Zetten, where she met fellow student Maria Sluis, with whom she remained friends until the end of her life. Together they went to study at the Christelijk Instituut voor Christelijke Sociale Arbeid (the Christian Social Work Institute) in Amsterdam. They lived in an attic and travelled a lot, including riding on ox-cart to the Pyrenees. Van Zanten worked as an au pair in France for a year and a half, and sailed alone on cargo ships to visit her brother in America.

Van Zanten wanted to become an air stewardess for KLM, the Netherlands' flag carrier airline, but was rejected in 1936 as she did not have a gymnasium diploma (secondary education qualification). Disappointed, she went on a world tour with money she had recently inherited from her parents. She travelled through the United States, Japan, China, Korea, and Indonesia, where she first went up in an aircraft, before returning home. She then left for Britain where she earned her pilot's licence in 1938, training in a Gypsy Moth for £1 per hour. Within 3 months she earned a pilot's 'A' licence and A, B and C gliding licences.

Returning to the Netherlands, and with the help of Dutch Air Force pilot Jan Leendert Plesman (later known in the RAF as The Flying Dutchman), and by directly approaching Albert Plesman, KLM's director, she was eventually hired as a stewardess by KLM. She worked with KLM for a few months but the Second World War intervened. In 1939, she became a hostess on a packetship belonging to the Van Nievelt Goudriaan shipping line.

== Second World War ==
By May 1940, van Zanten was in the Netherlands and offered her services as a volunteer with the Korps Vrouwelijke Vrijwilligers (KVV), the Women's Volunteer Aid Corps, to help families affected by the German bombing of Rotterdam during the invasion of the Netherlands.

After the fall of the Netherlands, the KVV was abolished but Van Zanten heard on a BBC radio broadcast that female transport pilots were being sought in Britain. 'From that moment on I knew what I wanted: I wanted to be there'. Van Zanten made two attempts to sail to Britain via the North Sea but both failed. She eventually managed to reach Switzerland, and with help from former KLM colleagues she got to Lisbon and was able to fly to London by plane on 13 August 1942 with a group of Engelandvaarders including Wil Kalkhoven.

On 1 October 1942, Queen Wilhelmina awarded her the Kruis van Verdienste (Cross of Merit) for "het in tijd van oorlog met groot beleid voorbereiden van hun ontsnapping uit het door den vijand bezet gebied van Nederland en het moedig en beleidvol uitvoeren van hun ontsnapping en reis naar Engeland, waaraan door het optreden van de vijand groote gevaren waren verbonden".("having prepared, with great care, her escape from enemy-occupied territory in the Netherlands in a time of war, and for having bravely accomplished her escape and journey to England, which was fraught with great dangers because of the enemy's actions"). Following the German invasion of the Netherlands in 1940, at the urging of the Dutch Cabinet, Queen Wilhelmina had fled to Britain and there, a Dutch government-in-exile was organized.

At first van Zanten worked with the Intelligence Office, where she met Prince Bernhard, son-in-law of Queen Wilhelmina. He enabled her entry into the Women's Auxiliary Air Force (WAAF). From the WAAF, van Zanten was able to join the female pilots in the Air Transport Auxiliary (ATA) under Commandant Pauline Gower. She joined the all-female ATA Pool No. 15 at Hamble, near Southampton, commanded by Margot Gore, as a Pilot Third Officer from 18 May 1943. The work involved transporting planes from the factories to the airfields in what was difficult and often dangerous work. She was one of two Dutch women, the other being Louise Schuurman ( "Dutch Lou"). ATA pilots had to be prepared to fly many different types of aircraft with often no more than a handbook as a guide and often in difficult conditions. She totalled 583 flying hours during her time in the ATA and remained with the organisation until 30 September 1945.

On 7 February 1947, Queen Wilhelmina awarded van Zanten the Vliegerkruis (Flying Cross) for "distinguishing herself by acts of initiative, courage and perseverance during one or more flights in an aircraft, by being classified in the rank of officer in the field of aviation in the period from 18 May 1943 to 30 September 1945, being assigned to the rank of officer in the organisation of the "Air Transport Auxiliary", as pilot to transfer various types of planes of the Allied Air Force from factories in Great Britain to various Allied war bases and to make 583 flying hours in solo flights". She was the only woman amongst about 700 men to be awarded the medal.

King George VI awarded her the British Defence Medal.

== Post-war and later life ==
After the war, with a British friend, van Zanten flew a twin-engine M.57 Miles Aerovan with six passengers to South Africa, where she became a partner in a small aviation company. When the rickety plane broke down, she ran out of money and returned to the Netherlands, and gave up flying professionally.

She became a social worker, her original course of study, later stating "I would have loved to fly, but I don't regret being a social worker. The job was more valuable than serving meals on an airplane as a flight attendant". She took up gliding as a hobby.

Van Zanten died of a heart attack in Emmen on 19 October 2000, aged 89.

== Awards and recognition ==
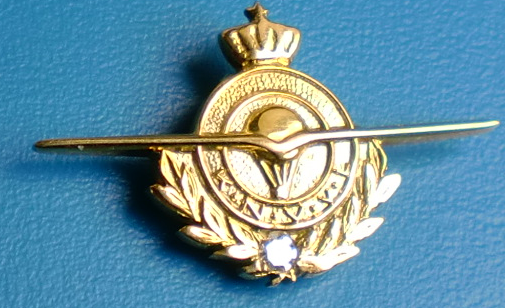
Button of "Koninklijk Nederlandse Vereniging voor Luchtvaart" awarded to Ida Veldhuyzen van Zanten.

In 1990, Ida Veldhuyzen van Zanten was awarded the Koninklijke Nederlandse Vereniging voor Luchtvaart the Royal Dutch Aeronautical Society's golden wings pin. At the age of eighty, she had flown for more than fifty years and had over two thousand flying hours to her name.

Ida Laura Veldhuyzen van Zanten was awarded four medals.

- Kruis van Verdienste, 1 October 1942
- Defence Medal 1939–1945
- Vliegerkruis, 7 February 1948
- Verzetsherdenkingskruis
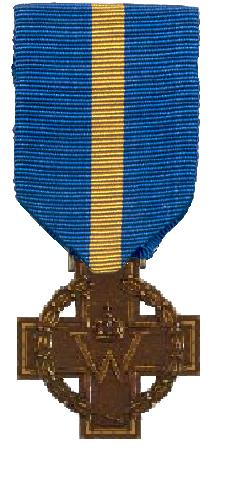
Kruis van Verdienste

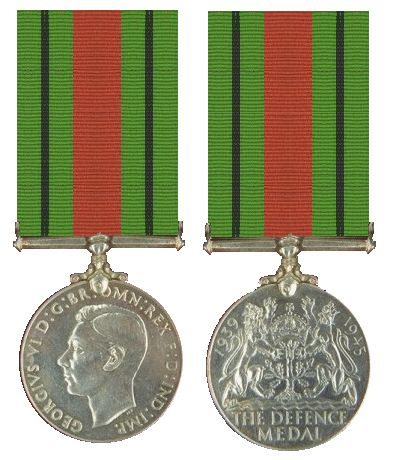
Defence Medal 1945

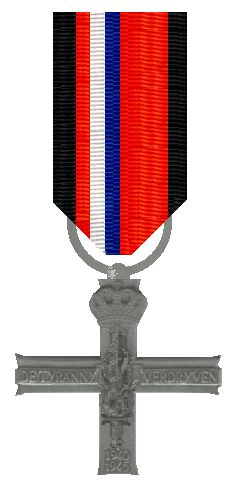
Verzetsherdenkings Kruis

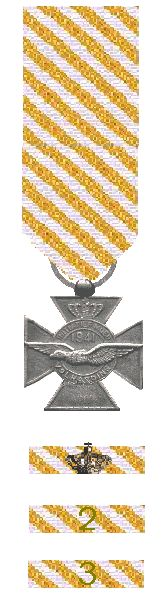
Vliegerkruis en baton

Ida Veldhuyzen van Zanten's ATA uniform is held at the Engelandvaarders Museum in Noordwijk aan Zee, South Holland.
