= Vera Strodl Dowling =

Danish aviator

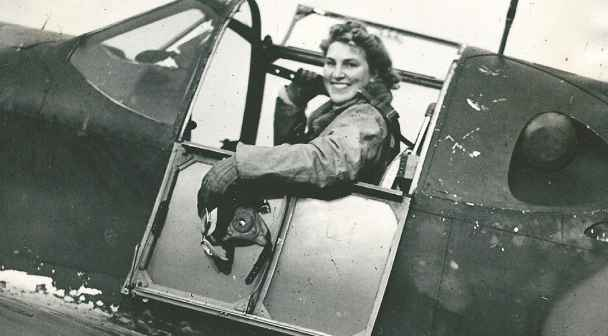
- Strodl in the cockpit of a North American Mustang !a in 1943
- Born: Vera Elsie Strodl; 16 July 1918; Braughing, Hertfordshire
- Died: 11 January 2015 (aged 96); Edmonton, Canada
- Occupation: Pilot

Vera Elsie Strodl Dowling (16 July 1918 – 11 January 2015) was a Danish pilot who gained fame in the Second World War as the only Scandinavian woman to fly for the RAF's Air Transport Auxiliary. Later, based in Alberta, Canada, she instructed pilots under the Commonwealth Training Programme. In May 2000, she was honoured with membership of Canada's Aviation Hall of Fame.

== Early life ==
Born in Braughing, Hertfordshire, on 16 July 1918, Vera Elsie Strodl was the daughter of Maren and Raimond Strodl. Her Danish parents had moved to England to run a cattle farm but ran into financial difficulties complicated by her father's problems with alcohol. In 1930, Maren Strodl returned to her native Bogense, Denmark, together with her children.

While still in England, as an eleven-year-old, Strodl dreamt of becoming a pilot after she first experienced flying. Back in Denmark, she was confirmed in the local church and took her realskole leaving examination in Bogense. In 1934, she returned to England to train as a pilot.

== Flying career ==
She settled in Hastings which was close to the Sussex Aero Club where she first worked as a waitress and cleaner in order to save some money for taking flying lessons. She was trained by an RAF veteran from the First World War, earning her pilot's ‘A’ License on 14 January 1937. Later that year, Strodl became an aircraft inspector with Philips & Powis Aircraft Ltd. based in Reading. She left the company for a position at Gloster Aircraft Company, as she wanted to learn about aircraft with riveted metal constructions. In 1939, she had planned to go to Australia, but gave up the idea as war became imminent. Instead, she joined Taylorcraft Aviation Corporation (later called Auster Aircraft Limited) at Rearsby, Leicestershire. Over the next two years, she worked as an aircraft inspector and production test pilot for the company.

== Involvement in World War II ==
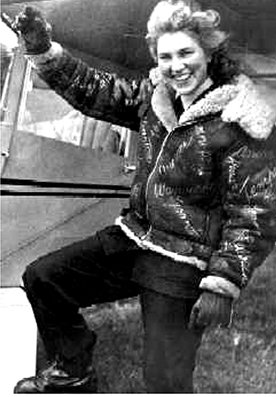
Strodl in her "bomb jacket" (c. 1945)

In 1941, she volunteered for the Air Transport Auxiliary (ATA) where she had the job of ferrying many different types of new, repaired and damaged military aircraft between factories and airfields until the end of the war in 1945. It was dangerous work as the ATA pilots were frequently targeted by German fighters but could also be shot down by British anti-aircraft batteries who sought to destroy German bombers. The pilots also risked flying into barrage balloons. They had to fly all types of aircraft from Spitfires to four-engined bombers, some of them so badly damaged that they were almost flying coffins. Although the ATA ferrying work was not as dangerous as mainstream RAF missions, there were many casualties, with one out of every six pilots losing their lives.

Whenever she flew a new type of aircraft, she wrote its name on her leather flying jacket. The jacket can now be seen at Nordfyns Museum in Bogense.

Strodl came close to disaster on several occasions. Once she was reported missing and presumed dead when she suddenly turned up in the mess. Strodl's wartime logbook shows she flew some 200 different flights totalling 1,500 hours. Of about 500 ATA pilots, she was one of some 100 women and the only one from Scandinavia to fly for the RAF during the Second World War.

== Post-war activities ==
In 1946, Strodl served with the Women's Royal Air Force Voluntary Reserve. She became a flying instructor at the Sandown Air Base on the Isle of Wight. In 1947, she was employed by Osterman Aero in Gothenburg, Sweden where she flew various aircraft including an amphibious Republic Seabee.

In 1952, Strodl moved to Alberta, Canada, where she worked as a flying instructor, first in Lethbridge, then in Edmonton. She also taught aerobatics.

== Personal life ==
In 1963, she married Standford J. Dowling. She continued to fly until 1987. In her seventies, she tested planes from Camrose Airport in Alberta, Canada. On her 85th birthday, she made a parachute jump. All in all, she clocked up over 30,000 flying hours.

For many years, in her spare time, Strodl flew for a local missionary organization. Her little yellow plane bore the inscriptions "God is a good God" and "Jesus saves and heals today". She visited remote communities in the prairies and the north of Canada, taking part in church services. Her faith was reinforced by her belief that God had literally held her in his wings.

Strodl died in Edmonton, Canada on 11 January 2015 aged 96.

== Awards ==
In the year 2000, Strodl was inducted into Canada's Aviation Hall of Fame for the great benefit to Canada of "her extraordinary enthusiasm for and life long dedication to aviation, in wartime and peace, particularly her dedication to flight instruction."
