= Jean Batten's 1934 record flight from England to Australia =

Jean Batten's 1934 record flight from England to Australia set a record of 14 days, 22 hours and 30 minute for a woman flying the distance between the respective countries solo. The record had been first established in 1930 by Amy Johnson.

Batten made two earlier attempts at the record but both failed after she crashed her aircraft in British India and Italy respectively. The successful record flight, made in a Gipsy Moth, began with a departure from Lympne Aerodrome in England on 8 May, and after refueling stops in 14 countries and having flown 10,500 miles (16,900 km), she landed at Darwin, in the northwest of Australia on the afternoon of 23 May. She was applauded around the world for her feat. She made four more long-distance record flights, including the first solo flight from England to New Zealand in 1936, before abruptly disappearing from public view. She lived as a recluse for most of the remainder of her life, travelling around the world. Batten died in Palma in Majorca on 22 November 1982 from complications arising from a dog bite.

== Background ==
Jean Batten was born in Rotorua, New Zealand on 15 September 1909 to Frederick Batten, a dentist, and his wife Ellen née Blackmore. The only daughter of the couple, she was encouraged by her mother to pursue masculine endeavours. She gained an interest in flight from an early age and was particularly motivated to learn to fly following a meeting with Charles Kingsford Smith after he completed the first Trans-Tasman flight in 1928. Her father refused to support her in her quest to learn to fly so, with her mother, Batten travelled to England in early 1930 for flight training at the London Aeroplane Club (LAC). By the end of the year, she had gained her 'A licence' to fly.

Batten soon aspired to fly from England to Australia solo in order claim the women's record for the trip of 10,500 miles (16,900 km) from the Englishwoman Amy Johnson, another member of the LAC. Johnson had set the record, which stood at 19½-days, in May 1930. However, finance proved to be a barrier and she and her mother returned to New Zealand to raise money for the feat. However, she was unsuccessful and by mid-1931, she decided to seek a 'B licence', which was required to become a commercial pilot, in the belief that it would add to her credibility with potential sponsors. This would require her to log 100 hours of flying time although she had only recorded 30 by this time. In July she returned to England aboard the SMS Rotorua, in a voyage funded by her brother John, and resumed her flight training at the LAC. This was paid for with a £500 loan from Fred Truman, a New Zealand pilot with the Royal Air Force who she had met on her trip out to New Zealand the previous year. Truman left the RAF in 1932 and was soon in London as well, tutoring Batten in navigation while he also worked towards gaining a 'B licence'. Batten gained hers in December 1932 and then disentangled herself from Truman without ever paying back the £500 he lent her.

During her time at the LAC, she encountered a number of record-breaking pilots, including Amy Johnson, Jim Mollison and C. W. A. Scott. At this time she also met Victor Dorée, another member of the LAC, who came from a wealthy family. Dorée borrowed £400 from his mother to buy Batten a Gipsy Moth, with which she intended to beat Johnson's record for flying from England to Australia solo. The agreement, as later recalled by Batten in her autobiography, entitled Dorée to half of any profits to be made from the endeavour. With an eye to facilitating any necessary repairs to the Gipsy Moth during her attempt on Johnson's record, Batten began to learn how to maintain aircraft and their engines.

== Record attempts from England to Australia ==
=== Preparations ===
The preparations for the record attempt included having her Gipsy Moth (Note: The aircraft was acquired from the King's Flight; it had previously been flown by the then Prince of Wales.) fitted with extra fuel tanks to increase its range to 800 miles (1,300 km). Visas and landing rights in 14 countries were secured, she made arrangements for refueling, and obtained a plethora of information on landmarks along her route. The planned flight path included stops in continental Europe, the Middle East, India, and Southeast Asia before landing at Darwin, in the north of Australia.

=== First attempt ===
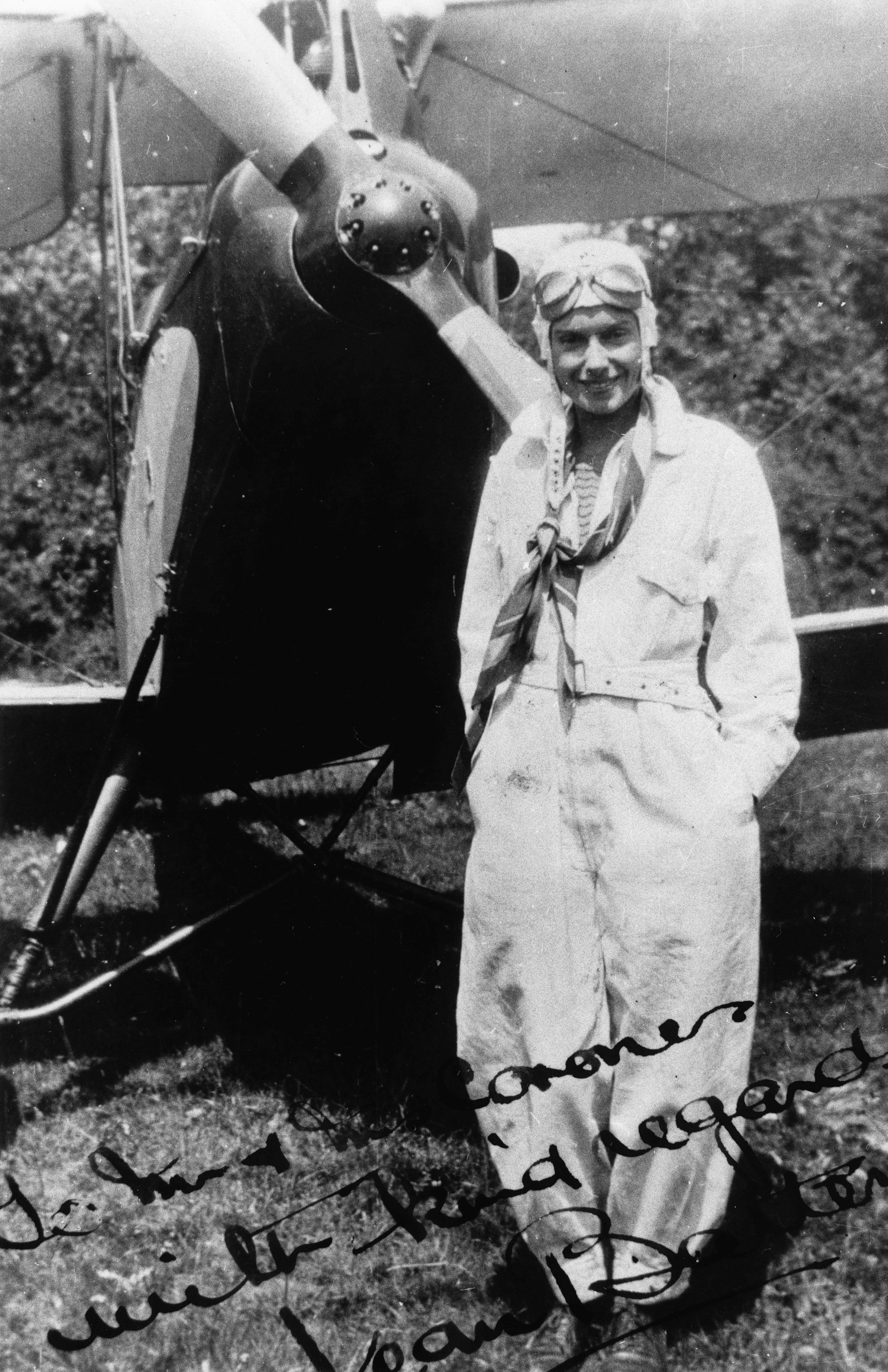
Batten with a Gipsy Moth

In a departure widely reported by newspaper media, Batten commenced her flight on 9 April 1933 from Lympne Aerodrome. She was not the only pilot attempting to break the record for the trip to Australia at the time; she took off 24 hours after an Italian, Leonida Robbiano, started his endeavour from Lympne.

The first leg was to Rome, a flight of ten hours. She had intended to stop at Marseille in France, but found cruising conditions particularly favourable and was able to eke out her fuel until Rome. She noted that this flight "caused considerable comment", being the first non-stop solo effort to be made by a woman from England to Italy. She then flew to Naples, from where she departed the next day for Athens. On 11 April, she made an early start, at 3:00am, making a nine-hour flight to Aleppo, in Syria, during which she encountered strong turbulence and heavy clouds that required her to fly on instruments alone. Later in the day, flying onto Baghdad, in Iraq, she flew into a sandstorm, which for a time required her to again fly on instruments before she decided to land during a brief break in the conditions. After an hour, she resumed the flight but had to make a night landing about 70 miles (110 km) from Baghdad when another sandstorm hit. She took off in the morning, and landed in Baghdad an hour later. She discovered that not only was she fortunate to have made a safe landing at her overnight location as it was predominantly soft sand, but a sandstorm would have prevented her landing at Baghdad even if she had continued her flight.

Batten continued onto Basra, and then Bushehr, in Iran, where she encountered Robbiano who had run out of fuel. (Note: Robbiano was killed a few days later, when he crashed his aircraft into the Bay of Bengal.) Still seeking to make good time, she made a 1:00am start for the next leg to Jask. After refueling she carried on to Karachi. After departing Jask, she encountered yet another sandstorm. This time she got the Gipsy Moth bogged in mud when making a forced landing. With help from nearby villagers, the aircraft was extracted from the mud but Batten found the propeller had been damaged. Not having a spare, she travelled to Karachi, initially on horseback and then by vehicle. At one of the towns she passed through, a telegram was sent to Karachi to arrange for a propeller to be provided for her collection on her arrival there. After travelling for 150 miles (240 km) through rough country she made it to Karachi airport. The next day she travelled by camel, transporting the replacement propeller back to her landing site. After fitting the new propeller, she took off for Karachi, having been delayed by 48 hours. Before reaching her destination, she experienced engine trouble; a conrod in the engine had snapped. Shutting down the engine, she glided into a landing on a road but the wings of the Gipsy Moth struck a roadside marker and it flipped onto its back. Fortunately, Batten was wearing her harness and other than being shaken, was unharmed. The accident put an end to her record flight attempt; she had flown 4,775 miles (7,685 km).

With the assistance of personnel from the RAF station there, she and her aircraft was retrieved from the crash site and taken to Karachi, where she was put up in a hotel. Without funds, she was at a loss at how to proceed but was then contacted by a representative of the Castrol oil company. Its chairman, Charles Wakefield, wanted to assist Batten and paid for her repatriation to England along with the wrecked Gipsy Moth. Back in England by early May, she needed a replacement for the Gipsy Moth, which was sold to the Brooklands Flying Club to be reconditioned. She could not persuade Dorée to buy her another aircraft and after this, she had nothing further to do with him. In her unpublished memoirs, she claimed she paid him back for the Gipsy Moth, although biographer Ian Mackersey states that this was disputed by Dorée's family.

=== Second attempt ===
Batten still intended to make her record flight and for several months, she sought financial assistance from newspapers and aviation companies but was unsuccessful. She struggled to make ends meet in London, where she lived with her mother. She did not appear to look for work during this time. The lack of funds meant her membership at the LAC lapsed and she was unable to fly. Finally, after initial rebuffs, she was finally able to secure £400 from Castrol. She shortly purchased a second-hand Gipsy Moth for £240. Five years old, the aircraft reportedly had four previous owners and had been reconditioned due to an accident.

The Gipsy Moth was kept at Brooklands, an aerodrome in Surrey, and Batten and her mother lived nearby while she prepared the aircraft for her record attempt. At Brooklands in early 1934, she met Edward Walter, a fellow Gipsy Moth pilot who was a stockbroker and had formerly served in the military. The two became engaged to be married within a few weeks of their meeting. Her planned route covered 13 countries, and required 25 stops, beginning with Marseille. She commenced her second attempt on 21 April, departing from Lympne Aerodrome that morning and arriving at Marseille in the early afternoon. Weather conditions were poor but despite this, she continued onto Rome but with only partially full tanks; she had wanted to avoid the Gipsy Moth becoming bogged down during takeoff on the saturated airfield at Marseille. The French authorities tried to dissuade her and when she did take off, it was only after signing of an indemnity. Although she believed she had sufficient fuel to make the trip with a small reserve, due to headwinds, her flight time was longer than expected. By the time she had reached the Italian coast, it was dark. She ran out of fuel over Rome and had to glide to a forced landing at San Paolo wireless station, in the city's Ostiense district. The landing, which narrowly avoided the wireless masts of the station, resulted in considerable damage to the aircraft and a severe cut to her face. In her autobiography, she claimed the Gipsy Moth had "very little damage".

She received stitches for the cut to her face but the damage to her Gipsy Moth was not as easily remedied; it included broken wing struts, a crumpled lower wing, and a damaged propeller. The spare propeller has also been broken. In addition, the undercarriage had been torn away. It took over a week for her aircraft to be repaired. The company carrying out the work did so for free, in acknowledgement of her courage, but Batten still had to source replacement parts. Walter sent over a propeller, scavenged from his own aircraft, and a lower wing was borrowed from an Italian pilot who also owned a Gipsy Moth. (Note: The loan of the lower wing was on the condition that it be refurbished and shipped back to Italy, mostly at Batten's expense.) Ten days after the crash, Batten flew her repaired aircraft back to England. She had decided to make a third attempt rather than continue with her present flight, which would have to include her time spent in Rome waiting for the repairs to her aircraft to be completed.

=== Third attempt ===
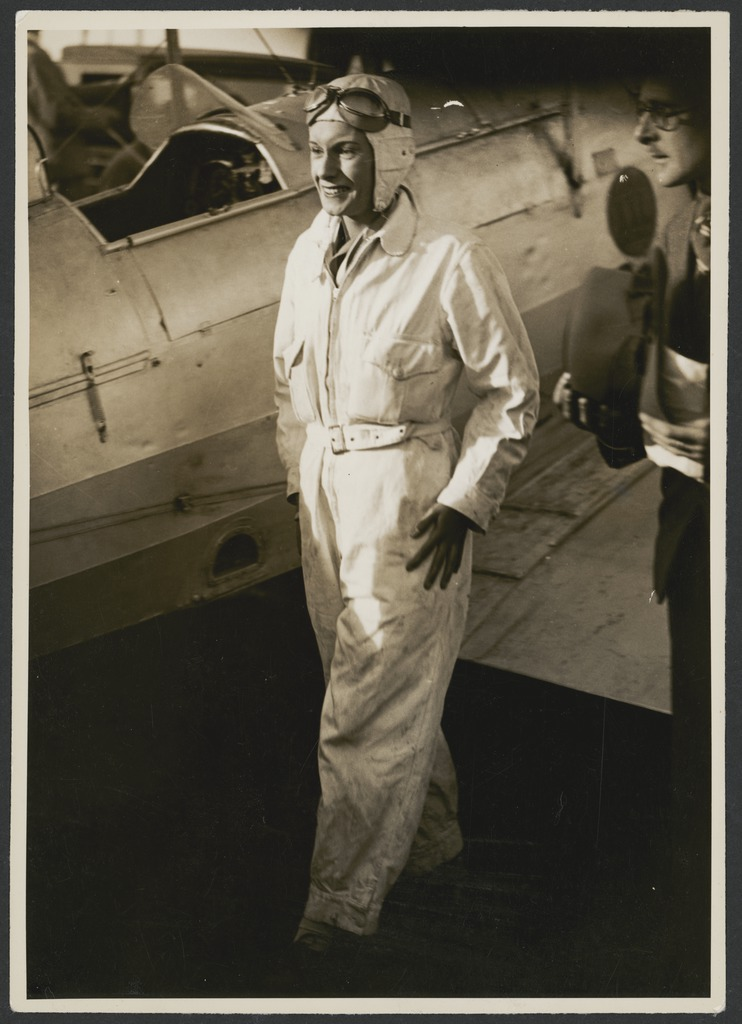
Batten after landing in Australia to complete her record flight. She made a point of wearing a white flying suit for the occasion.

Batten arrived back at Brooklands on 6 May and immediately set about preparing for her next flight. Despite Walter wanting her to give up on the record attempt, she persuaded him to lend her the lower wings of his Gipsy Moth. The set she had borrowed in Italy still needed to be refurbished and she did not want to wait, with the monsoon season in central Asia approaching. With help from engineers at Brooklands, her aircraft was quickly made ready and she departed just two days later, on 8 May. She had set herself a target of 14 days to reach Australia.

As with her previous flights, Batten departed from Lympne Aerodrome. She flew to Marseille, refuelled, and then went onto Rome arriving at nighttime. The next day, she flew to Athens, a leg of 740 miles (1,190 km) with a refuelling stop at Brindisi. The third day involved a single leg of around seven hours flying to Cyprus. Her 2,340 miles (3,770 km) flight from London to Cyprus was the first time this trip had been successfully completed by a solo pilot. For day four, she had planned to fly to Baghdad with a stop for fuel at Damascus. However, having replenished her supplies she ran into sandstorms and this caused her to divert to Rutbah Wells, an aerodrome 250 miles (400 km) to the west of Baghdad that was used by a number of airlines. Resuming her journey the next day, she flew onto Basra, with a stop in Baghdad along the way. An airliner had also arrived in Basra the same day, and the number of passengers meant that Batten was without a bed for the night. One passenger gave up his room so she could have a night's rest. A similar shortage of beds arose the next day when she flew onto Jask; a KLM airliner from the Dutch East Indies had arrived at the same time. The owners of the guesthouse there allowed Batten to sleep in their room for the night.

The 700 miles (1,100 km) flight from Jask to Karachi, on day seven of her journey, passed without incident. Batten flew onto Calcutta, a distance of 1,400 miles (2,300 km), which included stops at Jodphur and Allahabad. At the latter stop, a mechanic failed to secure an oil filter union in the Gipsy Moth's engine, resulting in a drop in oil pressure. Over half the oil had drained away by the time she landed at Dum Dum Aerodrome in Calcutta to end day nine.

Rangoon was the destination for day ten, achieved with a stop for fuel in Akyab. On the following day, she encountered the Intertropical Convergence Zone, which manifested itself in a heavy, storm-ridden cloud front, as she headed for Victoria Point, in the southern part of Burma. She had insufficient fuel to return to Rangoon so had to carry on through driving rain and turbulence, at times flying by instruments alone due to a lack of visibility. After nine and a half hours, she landed at the aerodrome at Victoria Point, her flying suit saturated with water.

Although it was only 1:00pm when Batten arrived, the rain meant she was unable to continue that day. Deliberately fueled light for the next leg to Alor Star, so as to help the Gipsy Moth take off from the sodden airfield, she encountered more rain but conditions gradually improved as she approached British Malaya. Having refueled at Alor Star and being briefly delayed due to the Gipsy Moth getting stuck in mud while taxiing for takeoff, she continued on to end day twelve at the RAF aerodrome at Salatar in Singapore. She was tracking well for her record attempt, being two days ahead of Johnson. There was increasing media interest in the endeavour.

The next leg was across the equator to Batavia, in the Dutch East Indies, a trip completed without incident. Her departure the next day was delayed due to fog; a car was driven up and down the runway to help temporarily clear the mist and allow Batten to take off. She refueled at Surabaya and went on to Rambang on Lombok Island, a somewhat bumpy flight with strong winds and turbulence. Day 14 involved a single leg of two hours to Timor; for part of the flight across the Alas Strait, she had to deal with particles of ash and cinder from a volcanic eruption on Flores Island. When she landed at Kupang, she was only 530 miles (850 km) from Australia. Batten's trip was now front-page headlines in London, where her mother was giving interviews to reporters.

The final leg, on 23 May 1934, involved a flight across the Timor Sea to Darwin, for the most part out of sight of land. Batten anticipated this leg would take around six hours to complete but miscalculated, resulting in some anxious moments until the Australian landmass was sighted. She crossed the coast about 20 miles (32 km) to the south of Darwin and shortly afterwards landed at the town's aerodrome at 1:30pm, filmed by a Fox Movietone camera crew. Her trip time of 14 days, 22 hours and 30 minutes had beaten Johnson's record by over four days.

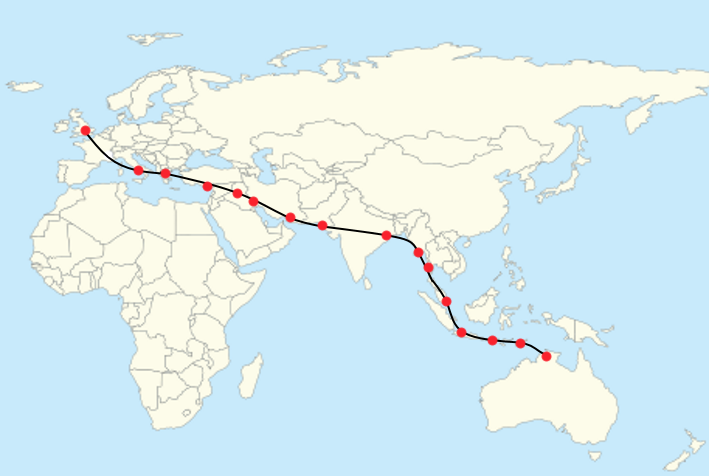
Batten's approximate flight path from England to Australia, May 1934; the second and successive red dots indicate the final stop for each day of flying

== Reception and legacy ==
The breaking of Johnson's four-year-old record was front-page news around the world and there was extensive and generally effusive reporting on Batten's feat by mainstream newspapers. However, The Times pointed out that the feat was achieved simply by spending less time on the ground and it saw little merit in record flights such as Batten's. The aeronautical press was also more restrained, with Flight magazine crediting improvements in ground facilities as a factor in her achievement. While Batten's successful solo flight was only the third to be made by a woman flying from Europe to Australia, (Note: Johnson's flight was the first, and a German pilot, Elly Beinhorn, made the second, in 1932, which took 110 days to complete due to lengthy stopovers for sightseeing.) the general route had already been flown thirty times and the overall record for a solo England to Australia flight stood at seven days, five hours, achieved by Kingsford-Smith the previous year. Much of the appeal for the public was due to Batten's beauty and glamour which was in contrast to Johnson's more down to earth nature.

Batten went onto Sydney in her Gipsy Moth. and along the way, she was greeted by well-wishers and received telegrams, in addition to those she had received while at Darwin. Wakefield arranged for an escort airplane to accompany her and the Gipsy Moth was emblazoned with a Castrol sticker. A crowd of 5,000, along with various dignitaries, was present to greet her when she landed at Mascot aerodrome. A series of public engagements in Australia followed for the next four weeks during which she was hosted at the expense of the Australian Government. She then went onto New Zealand for more public receptions in her honour.

Widely feted around the world, Batten went on to make three more record flights, most notably the first solo flight from England to New Zealand in 1936. She then disappeared from public view and lived a nomadic life around the world with her mother until the latter's death. After a period of depression, Batten briefly returned to public life before becoming a recluse again. She died in Palma in Majorca on 22 November 1982 from complications arising from a dog bite. Due to an absence of close friends in her life, and being distant from her family, the circumstances of her death did not become known for a number of years.
