= Jaye Edwards =

British aviator (1918–2022)

Stella "Jaye" Edwards (12 October 1918 – 15 August 2022) was a British aviator. Edwards, who was nicknamed "Jaye" and "Pete", flew Royal Air Force warplanes for the Air Transport Auxiliary (ATA) during World War II.

== Early life ==
She was born Stella Joyce Petersen on 12 October 1918 at Beckenham, Kent. The third of four daughters, with a younger brother, her father John Richard Sydney Petersen was an Australian trader and her mother Stella Courtenay (née Dawson) (1885–1951) read Natural Sciences at Girton 1904–1907, received a BA in 1907 from Trinity College Dublin (quasi ad eundem) and MA (Cantab) before becoming a science teacher before her marriage.

== Flying career ==
She became interested in flying having seen barnstormers and aerial circus acts. Watching her mother get on board a biplane and take off for Paris was a pivotal memory, and she was inspired by the exploits of the New Zealand aviator Jean Batten. In 1939 she began flight lessons in a de Havilland Tiger Moth. She gave her profession as "Flying Student" in the 1939 register. Edwards was awarded her pilot's license after passing her test on 16 August 1939, flying a de Havilland DH 60 Moth at Romford Flying Club. She recalled receiving her license in the post on 4 September of that year, the day after war was declared.

In the first years of the war, there were no roles for women pilots, so Edwards worked as a nurse. Early in 1943 Edwards saw a newspaper advertisement for women pilots to join the Air Transport Auxiliary and immediately applied. She was appointed as a third officer and began ferrying single-engine aircraft. She was posted to No 7 Pool based at Sherburn-in-Elmet in Yorkshire, near a number of aircraft factories. During her service, Edwards flew twenty different types of aircraft, often with very little training and always solo. She said that she disliked aerobatics and most enjoyed flying the Hawker Hurricane.

== Later life ==
After the war, Edwards gave up flying. Her ATA exit debrief stated she was a better pilot than she thought she was. She spent some time in the South Pacific and worked as a secretary in Singapore before moving to Vancouver, British Columbia, where she married Bill Edwards and had a son. She became a teacher.

When Prime Minister, Gordon Brown, approved the award of a commemorative badge to those who had served in the ATA, a badge was sent to Edwards for presentation in Vancouver. She returned to Britain in 2011 for an ATA commemorative event.

Edwards died age 103 on 15 August 2022, in Vancouver. She was the last living British member of the Attagirls, as the women pilots of the ATA were known.
