= Barker Field =

Former airfield in Toronto

Coordinates: 43°42′54″N 079°27′22″W

Location in Toronto

Barker Field was one of several airfields in the Yorkdale area of Toronto, Ontario, Canada.

== History ==
Opened in 1927, it was a civilian and privately owned airfield for the early era of flying in Canada and was named after William George Barker in 1931, a First World War fighter ace and Victoria Cross recipient. It remained in use until 1953. The area (northwest corner of Lawrence Avenue West and Dufferin Street bounded by Dufflaw and Orfus) has since been re-developed as a commercial site (auto dealership, gas station and other businesses).

The airfield used a rudimentary grass or dirt surface for aircraft to take off and land. Originally three runways in a triangular configuration and later two runways in a T shape.

In 1931 Canadian Colonial Airlines flew from Barker Field to Buffalo.

From 1937 and through World War II Barkers Field was owned and operated by Cyril (Red) L Murray. He ran Murray Aeronautical Corp Limited from Barkers Field until he sold it in the late 1940s. Leavens Bros Air Services relocated to the aerodrome in 1937 building hangars and workshops for their use and remaining there until 1953. From 1950 to 1954 it was home to Aero Activities Limited, a flying school operated by Marion Alice Orr. After Orr sold Barker Field, the property eventually ceased to be an airfield (workshops and hangars removed) and developed into the current land use for commercial, warehouse and light industrial use in what is now Yorkdale-Glen Park.

== See also ==
- List of abandoned airports in Canada
- List of airports in the Greater Toronto Area
