= Diana Barnato Walker =

English aviator

Diana Barnato Walker MBE FRAeS
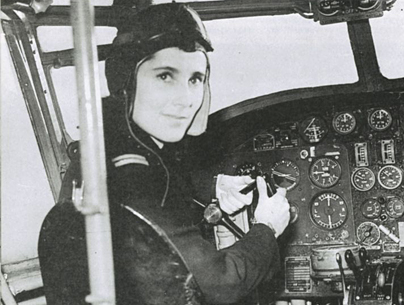
- Barnato Walker at the controls of an Airspeed Oxford
- Born: Diana Barnato; 15 January 1918; London, England
- Died: 28 April 2008 (aged 90); Surrey, England
- Education: Queen's College, London
- Occupation: Aviator
- Known for: first British woman to break the sound barrier
- Spouse: Derek Ronald Walker (m. 1944; died 1945)
- Partner: Whitney Straight
- Children: Barney Barnato Walker
- Parent(s): Woolf Barnato; Dorothy Maitland Falk
- Relatives: Barney Barnato (grandfather)
- Awards: MBE

Diana Barnato Walker MBE FRAeS (15 January 1918 – 28 April 2008) was a pioneering British aviator. In World War II, she became one of the first women pilots of the Air Transport Auxiliary, flying 80 types of aircraft and delivering 260 Spitfires. In 1963, she became the first British woman to break the sound barrier, flying at Mach 1.6, which also represented a world air speed record for women.

== Early life ==
Diana Barnato was born on 15 January 1918 in London, the younger daughter of Woolf Joel Barnato (1895–1948), a financier and racing driver, and Dorothy Maitland, née Falk (1892/3–1961). In 1936, at the age of 18, she was a debutante and was presented to King Edward VIII at Buckingham Palace. She attended Queen's College, London.

From an early age, she became interested in aircraft and at age 20 she decided to become a pilot. Her initial training was in Tiger Moths at the Brooklands Flying Club, the aerodrome being located within the famous motor racing circuit in Surrey. She showed a natural aptitude for flying and made her first solo flight after only six hours of dual instruction.

=== Family ===
Her parents were Dorothy Maitland Falk (1893–1961), an American from White Plains, New York and Woolf Barnato (1895–1948), Chairman of Bentley Motors and a leading member of their racing team. They were married at the Ritz Carlton in London. Her paternal grandfather was a British Jew, Barney Barnato (1851–1897), a co-founder of the De Beers mining company in Johannesburg. Her parents later divorced.

In 1935, her mother remarried to Lt. Richard Butler Wainwright. Her father remarried twice, first to Jacqueline Claridge Quealy from 1933 to 1947, and second, to Joan Jenkinson from 1947 until his death in 1948.

== World War II ==
=== Red Cross ===
Soon after the outbreak of World War II, Diana volunteered to become a Red Cross nurse. In 1940 she was serving as a nurse in France before the evacuation of the British Expeditionary Force from Dunkirk and later drove ambulances in London during the Blitz.

=== Air Transport Auxiliary ===
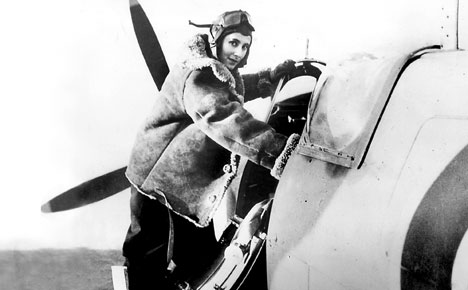
Barnato Walker climbing into the cockpit of a Spitfire while serving with the Air Transport Auxiliary.

In early 1941 she applied to become one of the first women pilots of the Air Transport Auxiliary (ATA) and successfully took her initial assessment flying test at their headquarters at White Waltham, Berkshire, on 9 March 1941 with the ATA's Chief Flying Instructor, A.R.O. Macmillan, in the Tiger Moth's rear seat.

Barnato Walker was admitted to the ATA's Elementary Flying Training School at White Waltham on 2 November 1941. After a lengthy period of intensive flight instruction and tests in primary training aircraft, she joined her first ATA Ferry Pool (FP), No.15 FP at RAF Hamble, Hampshire, on 9 May 1942. She soon began to deliver low-powered single engine aircraft from factory or repair base to storage units and RAF and Naval flying units.

Further advanced training permitted her to deliver several hundred Spitfires, Hurricanes, Mustangs, Tempests and other high performance fighter aircraft. After further training, she was eligible to deliver twin-engined aircraft and delivered Whitleys, Blenheims, Mosquitos, Mitchells and Wellingtons, normally flying solo when doing so. She continued intensive flying with the ATA until the organisation was disbanded in late 1945. By that time she had flown 80 types of aircraft and had delivered 260 Spitfires.

== Post war ==
=== Women's Junior Air Corps ===
After the end of the War, Barnato Walker continued flying and gained her commercial flying licence. For many years she was a volunteer pilot with the Women's Junior Air Corps (WJAC), later the Girls' Venture Corps, giving flights to air-minded teenage girls to encourage them to enter the aviation industry. In July 1948, an aircraft that she was flying burst into flames near White Waltham. Rather than bail out and lose the WJAC's aircraft, she switched off the fuel and glided the aircraft back.

=== Air Speed record ===
On 26 August 1963 she flew an English Electric Lightning T4 to Mach 1.6 (1,262 mph) after convincing the Air Minister to let her fly it with Squadron Leader Ken Goodwin as her check pilot, and so became the first British woman to break the sound barrier. She also established by this flight a world air speed record for women.

== Personal life ==
She was engaged to Squadron Leader Humphrey Trench Gilbert DFC of No. 65 Sqn RAF in April 1942, but he died in a flying accident 2 May 1942 when Spitfire BL372/YT-Z crashed at Loves Farm, Cutlers Green, Thaxted, Essex. With him in the Spitfire was Flt Lt David Gordon Ross. They took off from Great Sampford, the RAF Debden satellite station, having consumed 6-8 bottles each of Benskins Colne Springs beer, according to the licensee of the pub. This information was not revealed until after the Court of Enquiry. The Commanding Officer tried to borrow a Magister but his flight sergeant, realising that he was in no fit state to fly, told him it was unserviceable. He then took a Spitfire.

Two years later, on 6 May 1944, she married Wing Commander Derek Ronald Walker RAF. He continued active flying operations until he was killed on 14 November 1945 in bad weather while flying a North American Mustang fighter between two UK airfields.

Barnato Walker vowed never to marry again. For 30 years she was in a relationship with Whitney Straight, a married pilot and a pre-war champion racing driver, like her father. In 1947, the couple had a son: Barney Barnato Walker.

Shortly after her record-breaking flight in 1963, Barnato Walker was diagnosed with cancer, and subsequently had three operations. She was awarded the MBE in 1965 for services to aviation, and was a Fellow of the Royal Aeronautical Society. She died on 28 April 2008, aged 90.
