= Air Transport Auxiliary =

British WWII aviation support organisation

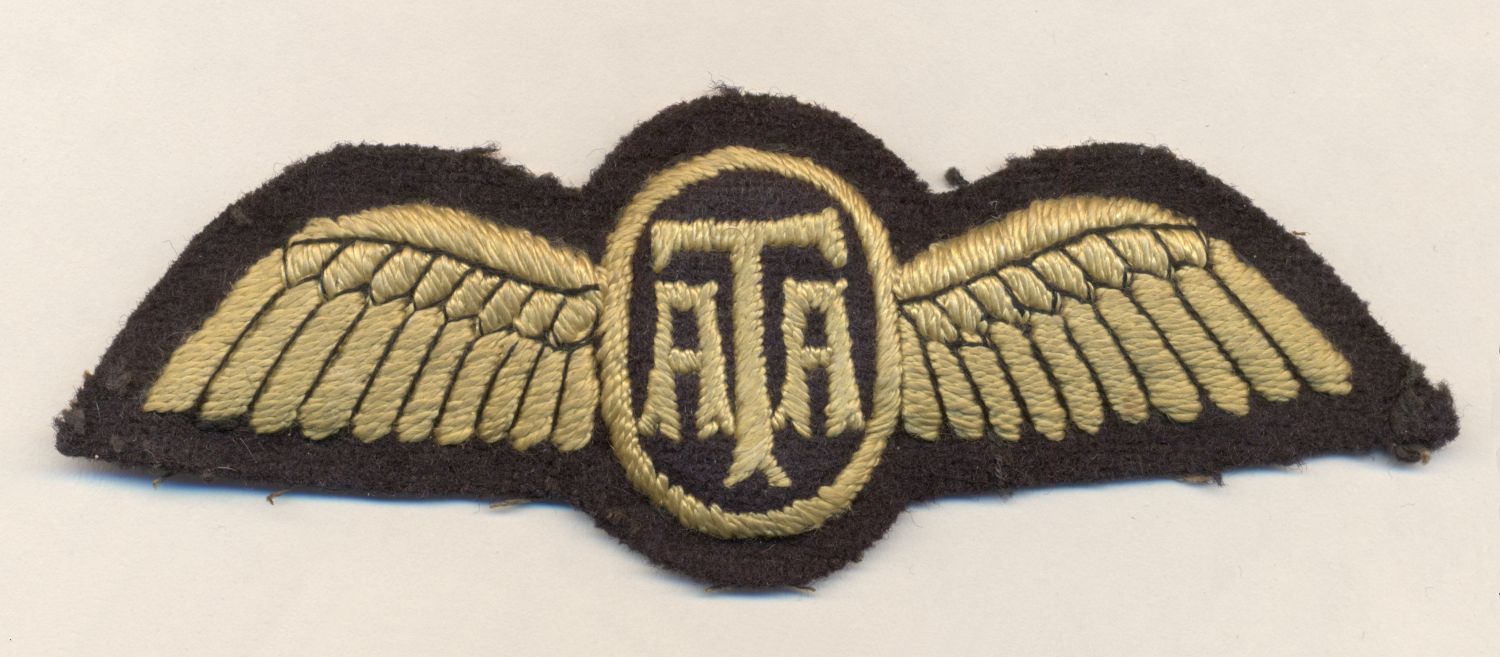
- ATA, Air Transport Auxiliary Ferry pilot's badge
- Active: 15 February 1940–30 November 1945
- Country: United Kingdom
- Size: 16 ferry pools (1944); Air Movement Flight Unit; 2 Training Units; 1,152 pilots (male) 168 pilots (female); 151 flight engineers 19 radio officers 27 ADCC, ATC, and Sea cadets 2,786 ground staff
- Command HQ: White Waltham, Maidenhead
- Nicknames: Call sign: Lost Child; Ferdinand (overseas)
- Mottos: Latin: Aetheris Avidi "Eager for the Air"; Unofficial: Anything To Anywhere
- Decorations: 2 Commander British Empire (CBE); 13 Officer British Empire (OBE); 36 Member British Empire (MBE); 6 British Empire Medal (BEM); 1 George Medal; 6 Commendations; 5 Commended for Gallantry; 18 King's Commendation for Valuable Service in the Air

The Air Transport Auxiliary (ATA) was a British civilian organisation set up at the start of the Second World War with headquarters at White Waltham Airfield in Berkshire. The ATA ferried new, repaired and damaged military aircraft between factories, assembly plants, transatlantic delivery points, maintenance units (MUs), scrapyards, and active service squadrons and airfields, but not to naval aircraft carriers. It also flew service personnel on urgent duty from one place to another and performed some air ambulance work. Notably, around 10% of its pilots were women, and from 1943 they received equal pay to their male colleagues, a first for the British government.

== Mission ==
The initial plan was that the ATA would carry personnel, mail and medical supplies, but the pilots were immediately needed to work with the Royal Air Force (RAF) ferry pools transporting aircraft. By 1 May 1940 the ATA had taken over transporting all military aircraft from factories to maintenance units to have guns and accessories installed. On 1 August 1941, the ATA took over all ferrying jobs. This freed the much-needed combat pilots for combat duty. At one time there were fourteen ATA ferry pools as far apart as Hamble, near Southampton, and Lossiemouth, near Inverness in Scotland.

A special ATA Air Pageant was held at White Waltham on 29 September 1945 to raise money for the ATA Benevolent Fund, supported by the aircraft companies that had been served by the ATA. It included comprehensive static displays of Allied and German aircraft, including a V1, aero engines, and an anti-aircraft gun and searchlight complete with crew. Pilots taking part included Alex Henshaw in a Supermarine Seafire.

Lord Beaverbrook, a World War II Minister of Aircraft Production, gave a tribute at the closing ceremony disbanding the ATA at White Waltham on 30 November 1945:

Without the ATA the days and nights of the Battle of Britain would have been conducted under conditions quite different from the actual events. They carried out the delivery of aircraft from the factories to the RAF, thus relieving countless numbers of RAF pilots for duty in the battle. Just as the Battle of Britain is the accomplishment and achievement of the RAF, likewise it can be declared that the ATA sustained and supported them in the battle. They were soldiers fighting in the struggle just as completely as if they had been engaged on the battlefront.

== Accomplishment ==
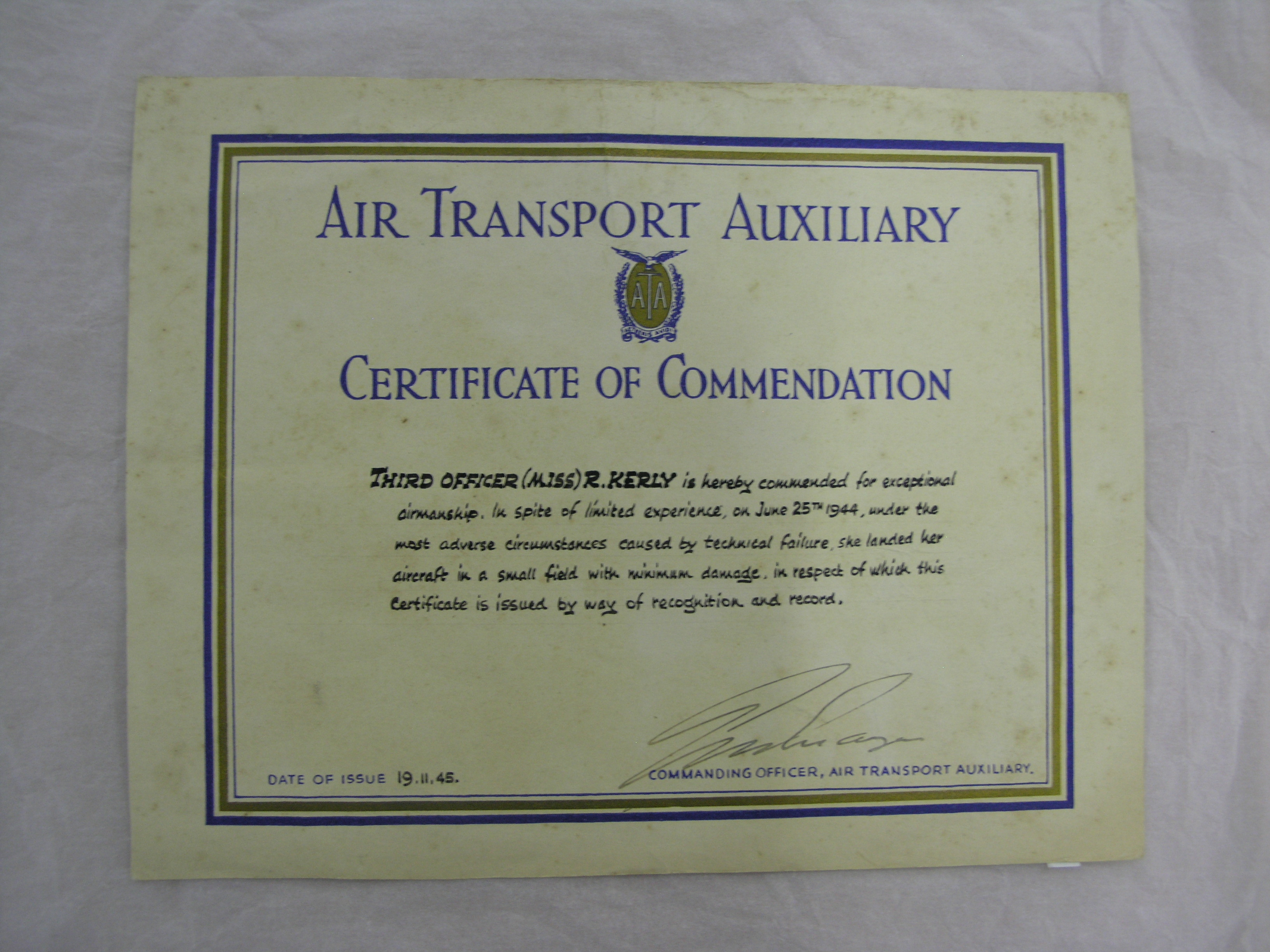
Commendation for ATA pilot Ruth Kerly

During the war the ATA flew 415,000 hours and delivered more than 309,000 aircraft of 147 types, including Spitfires, Hawker Hurricanes, de Havilland Mosquitoes, North American Mustangs, Avro Lancasters, Handley Page Halifaxes, Fairey Swordfish, Fairey Barracudas and Boeing Fortresses. The average aircraft strength of the ATA training schools was 78. A total of 133,247 hours were flown by school aircraft and 6,013 conversion courses were put through. The total flying hours of the Air Movement Flight were 17,059, of which 8,570 were on domestic flights and 8,489 were on overseas flights. About 883 tons of freight were carried and 3,430 passengers were transported without any casualties; but a total of 174 pilots, were killed flying for the ATA in the wartime years. Total taxi hours amounted to 179,325, excluding Air Movements.

As non-operational delivery flights, the aircraft guns were not loaded. After an encounter with German fighters in UK airspace, the mid-upper gun turrets of Avro Anson transports were armed. However, it was realised that this was against international law as the ATA staff were technically civilian status. A number of solutions were considered but eventually the gunners were withdrawn.

== Administration ==
The administration of the ATA fell to Gerard d'Erlanger, a director of British Airways Ltd. He had suggested an organisation along the lines of the ATA in a letter dated 24 May 1938. Initially the Air Ministry was lukewarm to the idea but, with war imminent, they accepted d'Erlanger's proposal and the ATA was set up in 1939.

In late August 1939 the ATA was placed under British Airways Ltd for initial administration and finance, but on 10 October 1939 Air Member for Supply and Organisation (AMSO) took over. The first pilots were assigned to RAF Reserve Command and attached to RAF flights to ferry trainers, fighters and bombers from factory and storage to Royal Air Force stations. The ATA's Central Ferry Control, which allocated the required flights to all Ferry Pools, was based at RAF Andover.

Late in 1939 it was decided that a third and entirely civilian ferry pool should be set up at White Waltham, near Maidenhead in Berkshire. The operations of this pool began on 15 February 1940. On 16 May 1940 RAF Maintenance Command took control through its No. 41 Group. Then, on 22 July 1941, the ATA was placed under the control of Lord Beaverbrook's Ministry of Aircraft Production (MAP). Although control shifted between organisations, administration was carried out throughout the war by staff led by Commodore Gerard d'Erlanger, first at British Airways Ltd then, after its merger in 1940, at the British Overseas Airways Corporation (BOAC).

== Pilots and engineers ==
First Officer Maureen Dunlop on the cover of Picture Post magazine

The ATA recruited pilots who were considered unsuitable for either the Royal Air Force or the Fleet Air Arm by reason of age, fitness or sex. A unique feature of the ATA was that physical disabilities were ignored if the pilot could do the job – thus, there were one-armed, one-legged, short-sighted and one-eyed pilots, humorously referred to as "Ancient and Tattered Airmen" (ATA).

The ATA also took pilots from other countries, both neutral and combatant. People from 28 countries flew with the ATA, including Prince Suprabhat Chirasakti (or Jirasakdi), the adopted nephew of the abdicated King Prajadhipok (Rama VII) and Queen Rambai Barni of Thailand. He died in the crash of a Hurricane in 1942.

=== Women pilots ===
Most notably, the ATA allowed women pilots to ferry aircraft. The female pilots (nicknamed "Attagirls") had a high profile in the press. On 14 November 1939 Commander Pauline Gower was given the task of organising the women's section of the ATA. The first eight women pilots were accepted into service as No 5 Ferry Pilots Pool on 1 January 1940, initially only cleared to fly de Havilland Tiger Moth biplanes from their base in Hatfield. They were: Joan Hughes, Margaret Cunnison, Mona Friedlander, Rosemary Rees, Marion Wilberforce, Margaret Fairweather, Gabrielle Patterson, and Winifred Crossley Fair.

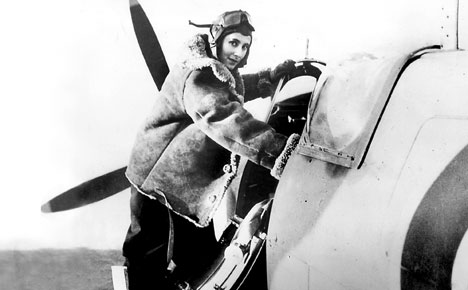
Diana Barnato Walker climbing into the cockpit of a Spitfire

During World War II there were 166 women pilots, one in eight of all ATA pilots, and they volunteered from Britain, Canada, Australia, New Zealand, South Africa, the United States, the Netherlands and Poland. British women pilots included Mary de Bunsen, Ethel Ruth Nicholson, Edith Beaumont and Diana Barnato Walker. Annette Elizabeth Mahon was the only Irish woman to serve in the ATA. From Argentina and Chile came Maureen Dunlop and Margot Duhalde, and from Denmark Vera Strodl Dowling. Six Canadian women pilots flew in the ATA, including Marion Alice Orr, Violet Milstead and Helen Harrison-Bristol.

Fifteen of these women lost their lives in service, including the British pioneer aviator Amy Johnson, Margaret Fairweather, Joy Davison, Jane Winstone, Honor Salmon, Susan Slade and Dora Lang who died alongside Flight Engineer Janice Harrington. Two of the women pilots received commendations; one was Helen Kerly.

A notable American member of the ATA was the aviator Jacqueline Cochran, who returned to the United States and started a similar all-female organisation known as the Women Airforce Service Pilots (WASP).

In June 1940, the role of No 5 Ferry Pilots Pool was expanded to other non-combat types of aircraft (trainers and transports) such as the de Havilland Dominie, Airspeed Oxford, Miles Magister and Miles Master. Eventually women were incorporated in the other (previously all-male) ferry pools, and were permitted to fly virtually every type flown by the RAF and the Fleet Air Arm, including the four-engined heavy bombers, but excluding the largest flying boats. Hurricanes were first flown by women pilots on 19 July 1941, and Spitfires in August 1941.

One notable feature of the ATA was that women received the same pay as men of equal rank, starting in 1943. This was the first time that the British government had agreed to equal pay for equal work within an organisation under its control. At the same time American women flying with the WASP were receiving as little as 65 per cent of the pay of their male colleagues.

After the death in December 2020 of Eleanor Wadsworth at the age of 103, and of Jaye Edwards (née Stella Joyce Petersen; served as Third Officer in the ATA from 1943 to 1945) in August 2022 only one female former ATA pilot survived, American Nancy Stratford. Wadsworth had joined the ATA in 1943, flew 22 different aircraft types, and flew Spitfires 132 times. Stratford, who co-wrote Contact! Britain!: A Woman Ferry Pilot’s Story During WWII in England about her wartime flying career, turned 106 in June 2025.

=== Engineers ===
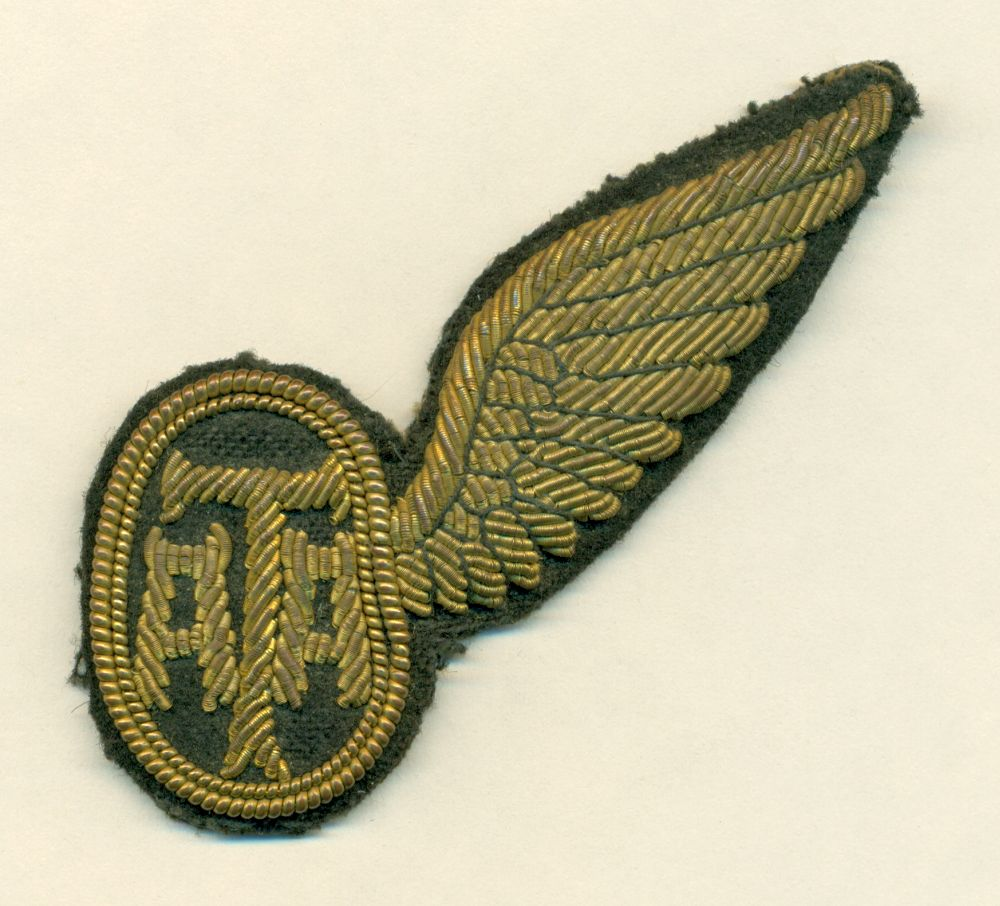
ATA, Air Transport Auxiliary Flight Engineer's wing

As the ATA became established and expanded the size and number of aircraft variants, the need for having a variety of engineers quickly became apparent. Further, as they began delivering larger multi-engine aircraft, the Flight Engineer (F/E) became essential in assisting the pilots. They were presented with their own unique insignia in both stitched and bullion variations.

There were many specific categories and levels of Engineers within the ATA organisation including Flight, Ground, SCE, Records Clerk, Tarmac, etc. Of the approximately 30 Operational Flight Engineers, only a handful were women. One of these was Patricia Parker who started her career with the ATA as a Pilot, third class but went on to become a Flight Engineer. Others were Janice Harrington (died in service), Phillis Pierce and Alice Thomas, the latter who also started as a pilot with the ATA.

== Training ==
The first ATA pilots were introduced to military aircraft at the RAF's Central Flying School (CFS), but the ATA soon developed its own training programme. Pilots progressed from light single-engined aircraft to more powerful and complex aircraft in stages. They first qualified on "Class 1" single-engined aircraft such as the Tiger Moth, Magister and Percival Proctor, then gained experience by doing ferrying work with any aircraft in that class, before returning to training to qualify and gain experience on the Class 2 advanced single-engined aircraft. The same process was followed to progress to Class 3 light twin-engined aircraft and Class 4 advanced twin-engined aircraft.

In each case, once cleared to fly one class of aircraft, pilots could be asked to ferry any plane in that class even if they had never seen that type of aircraft before. To do so they had ATA Pilots Notes, a two-ring book of small cards with the critical statistics and notations necessary to ferry each aircraft.

To fly Class 5 four-engined aircraft, pilots were first trained on the Handley Page Halifax heavy bomber and then could be permitted by their Commanding Officer to fly other similar types such as the Avro Lancaster when they had acquired more experience. When flying Class 5 aircraft and certain Class 4 aircraft, the pilot was the sole pilot but was always accompanied by a further crew member such as a flight engineer. There were further rules for Class 6 flying boat ferrying.

The ATA trained its pilots only to ferry planes, rather than to achieve perfection on every type. For example, aerobatics and blind flying were not taught, and pilots were explicitly forbidden to do either, even if they were capable of doing so. Also, in order not to strain the engines, an "ATA cruise" speed was specified in the ATA Pilots Notes. The objective of the ATA was to deliver aircraft safely and that meant taking no unnecessary risks.

== Ranks ==
ATA ranking system
ATA rank	Commodore	Senior Commander	Commander	Captain and Flight Captain	First Officer	Second Officer	Third Officer	Cadet
Rank insignia								

ATA rank insignia was worn on the shoulder strap of the uniform jacket.

== Units ==
The following units were active in the ATA:

- No. 1 Ferry Pool ATA White Waltham, Maidenhead
  Previously: No. 1 Ferry Pilots Pool ATA − 'A' Section of No. 3 Ferry Pilot Pool ATA
- No. 2 Ferry Pool ATA Whitchurch, Bristol
  Previously: No. 2 Ferry Pilots Pool ATA − 'B' Section of No. 3 Ferry Pilot Pool ATA
- No. 3 Ferry Pool ATA Hawarden, Chester
  Previously: No. 3 Ferry Pilots Pool ATA − 'C' Section of No. 3 Ferry Pilot Pool ATA
- No. 4 Ferry Pool ATA Prestwick, Ayrshire
  Previously: No. 4 Ferry Pilots Pool ATA
- No. 5 Ferry Pool ATA Thame, Oxfordshire (Training Unit)

Previously: No. 5 Ferry Pilots Pool ATA − 'D' Section of No. 3 Ferry Pilot Pool ATA − Women's Ferry Pilot Pool ATA

- No. 6 Ferry Pool ATA Ratcliffe, Leicester

Previously: No. 6 Ferry Pilots Pool ATA

- No. 7 Ferry Pool ATA Sherburn-in-Elmet, Leeds

Previously: No. 7 Ferry Pilots Pool ATA

- No. 8 Ferry Pool ATA Sydenham, Belfast

Previously: No. 8 Ferry Pilots Pool ATA

- No. 9 Ferry Pool ATA Aston Down, Gloucestershire

Previously: No. 9 Ferry Pilots Pool ATA

- No. 10 Ferry Pool ATA Lossiemouth, Moray

Previously: No. 10 Ferry Pilots Pool ATA − No. 4 Ferry Pilot Pool ATA

- No. 12 Ferry Pool ATA Cosford, Shropshire

Previously: No. 12 Ferry Pilots Pool ATA

- No. 14 Ferry Pool ATA Ringway, Manchester

Previously: No. 14 Ferry Pilots Pool (Civilian) ATA

- No. 15 Ferry Pool ATA Hamble, Southampton

Previously: No. 15 Ferry Pilots Pool ATA

- No. 16 Ferry Pool ATA Kirkbride, Carlisle

Previously: No. 16 Ferry Pilots Pool ATA − No. 4 Ferry Pilot Pool ATA

- No. 5 (T) Ferry Pool ATA

Previously: (Training) Ferry Pool ATA

- Initial Flying Training School ATA

Previously: Elementary Flying Training School ATA − ATA School

- Air Movements Flight ATA (1942–45)
- Advanced Flying Training School ATA (1942–45)

Previously: ATA School

== Recognition ==
In 2008 the surviving members of the auxiliary were awarded Air Transport Auxiliary Veterans Badges in recognition for their contributions to the war effort. The badge was announced by Transport Secretary, Ruth Kelly in February 2008. Some of the awards were presented directly by Prime Minister Gordon Brown at a Downing Street reception in September 2008.

== In media ==
- Dewar, Isla. Izzy's War. Ebury Press, 2010.
- Flude, Ray (2023). "Girls Can Win Wings! The Air Transport Auxiliary Women Who Learned to Fly Ab Initio". The Aviation Historian (44): 66–77. ISSN 2051-1930.
- Gould, Carol. Spitfire Girls: A Tale of the Lives and Loves Achievements and Heroism of the Women ATA Pilots in World War II. Forfar: Black Ace Books, 1998.
- Lord Brown, Kate. The Beauty Chorus. London: Corvus Atlantic, 2011
- Matthews, Beryl. A Flight of Golden Wings. Sutton: Severn House, 2007.
- Morrison, Margaret and Pamela Tulk-Hart. Paid to Be Safe. London: Hutchinson, 1948.
- Ryan, Garry. Blackbirds (2012) and Two Blackbirds (2014). Calgary, Alberta: NeWest Press.
- Schrader, Helena. The Lady in the Spitfire. Lincoln, Nebraska: iUniverse, Inc, 2006.
- Singer, E. M. Mother Flies Hurricanes. Bend, OR: Avidia Cascade Press, 1999.
- Terrell, George. I'll Never Leave You. San Jose: Writer's Showcase, 2001.
- Wein, Elizabeth. Code Name Verity (Electric Monkey, 2012) and Rose Under Fire (2013)
- Lester, Natasha. The Paris Secret. New York: Forever (Hachette Book Group), 2020.
- Blythe, Jim: Aviatrix. Stage play performed by A48 Theatre Company, Cardiff, 2023.

== See also ==
- Women Airforce Service Pilots

Personnel

- Category:Air Transport Auxiliary pilots
- Monique Agazarian
- Faith Bennett
- Jean Bird
- Lois Butler
- Jacqueline Cochran
- Winifred Crossley Fair
- Margaret Cunnison
- Lettice Curtis
- Elsie Joy Davison
- Gerard d'Erlanger
- Mary de Bunsen
- Jerzy Drzewiecki
- Margot Duhalde
- Maureen Dunlop
- Mary Ellis
- Margaret Fairweather
- Joy Ferguson
- Margaret Frost
- Pauline Gower
- Helen Harrison-Bristol
- Naomi Heron-Maxwell
- June Constance Howden
- Joan Hughes
- Amy Johnson
- Jim Kempster
- Freydis Leaf (Sharland)
- Constance Leathart
- Anna Leska
- Annette Elizabeth Mahon
- Jim Mollison
- Marion Orr
- Jadwiga Piłsudska
- Helen Richey
- Molly Rose
- Audrey Sale-Barker
- Vera Strodl Dowling
- Diana Barnato Walker
- Ann Welch
- Marion Wilberforce
- Benedetta Willis
- Philip Wills
- Ann Wood-Kelly
- Ida Veldhuyzen van Zanten
- Veronica Volkersz
- Jane Winstone
- Stefania Wojtulanis-Karpińska (known as Barbara)
