= Throat microphone =

Type of contact microphone

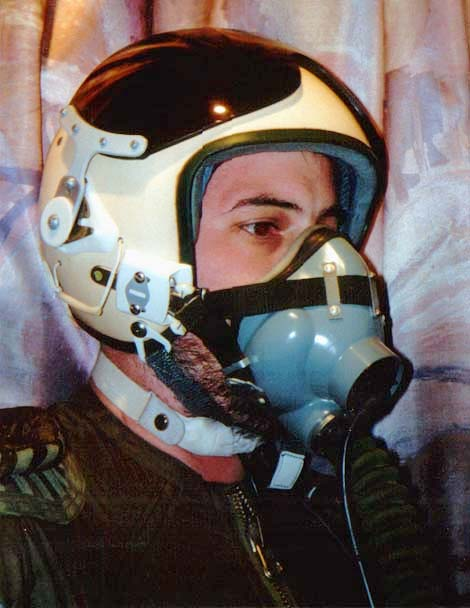
Oxygen mask KM-34 for MiG pilots with a throat microphone

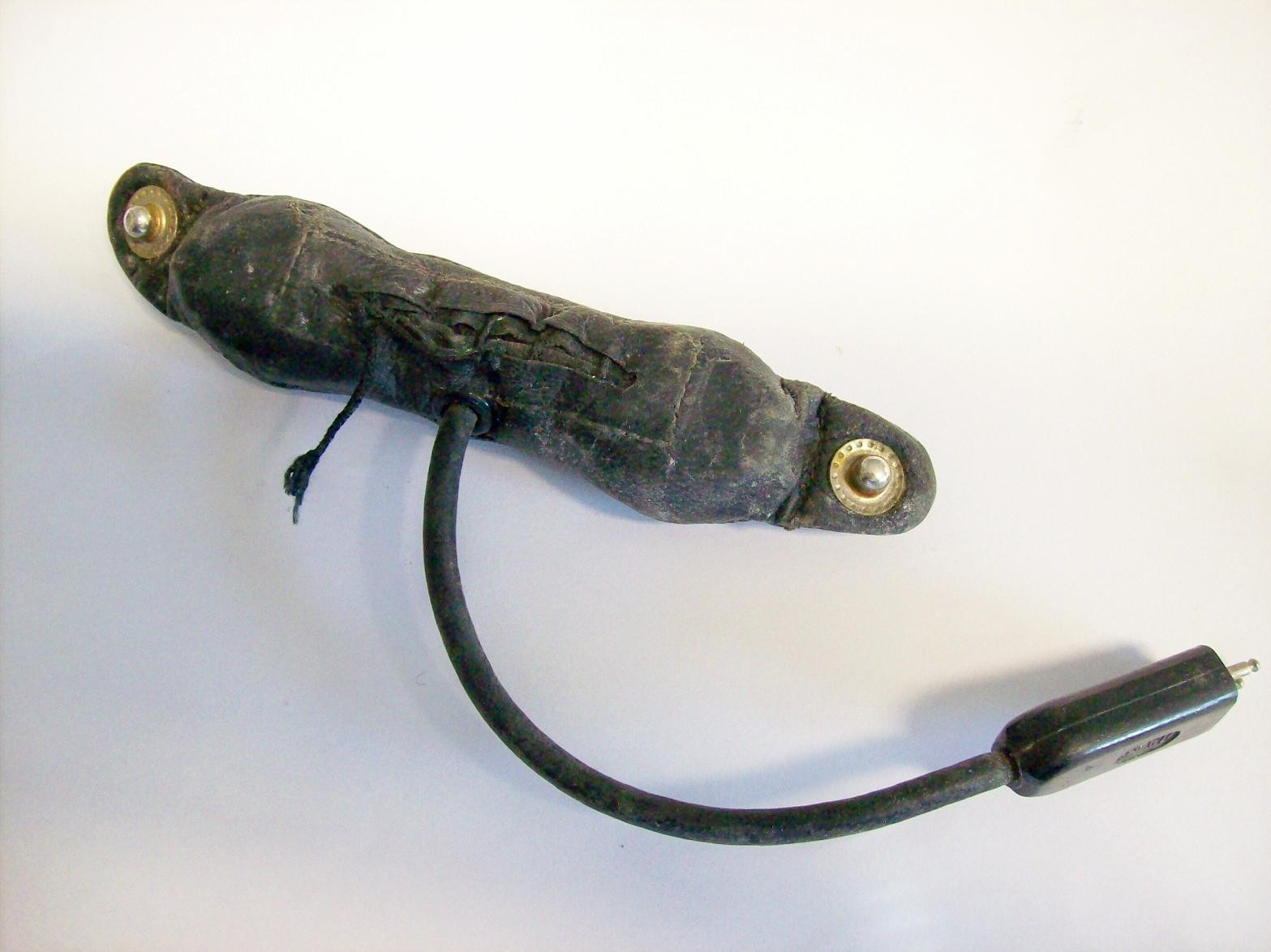
Throat microphone LA-5 (Soviet Union early 1980s), same model as above

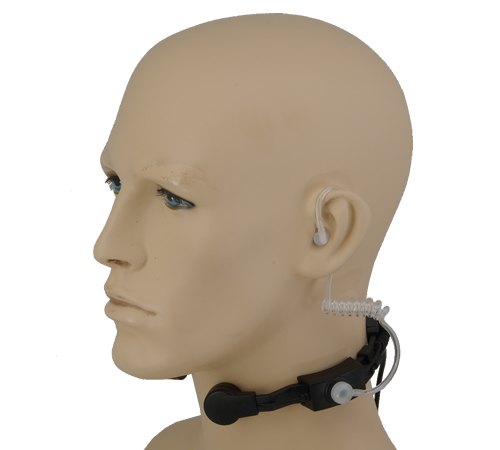
A general-purpose throat mic used for two-way radio communications

A throat microphone, also called a laryngophone, is a type of contact microphone that absorbs vibrations directly from the wearer's throat by way of single or dual sensors worn against the neck. The sensors, called transducers, can pick up speech even in extremely noisy or windy environments, such as on a motorcycle or in a nightclub. Other types of microphones do not function well under these conditions because of high levels of background noise. Advanced laryngophones are able to pick up whispers, and therefore perform well in environments where communicating with others at a distance in silence is required, such as during covert military or law enforcement operations. Throat microphones are also very useful when helmets or respiratory protection is required. Many full-face SCBA, CABA, SAR Respirator, Elastomeric Respirator, N95 Respirator PAPR, or re-breather masks do not have a provision for a microphone inside the mask. The throat microphone can be used safely, as it is positioned outside the mask's face seal and as such does not compromise the respiratory protection provided by the mask, nor does it violate mask approvals and certification.

== Operation ==
A contact microphone is fastened to the neck below the larynx and records a signal related to the sound in the trachea. The contact microphone senses the vibration in the wall of the neck. These vibrations reflect the mechanical shocks that result from the closing of the glottis and the variations of the subglottic pressure. This results from the interrupted transglottal airflow.

A contact microphone can also be known as an accelerometer microphone. This is fastened below the larynx to produce a signal that is related to the vocal fold vibrations and the sound pressure in the trachea. The waveform produced by the contact microphone is usually independent of articulation. This is due to the high glottal impedance. The signal produced by the contact microphone measures fundamental frequency. The contact microphone is a simple accelerometer containing a piezo-electric ceramic disc as the pick-up unit. The disc is enclosed in a metal container of 15 mm in diameter and 5 mm in thickness and weighs about 20 grams.

== History ==
=== World War I – first throat mics ===
Charles Edmond Prince led the development of throat microphones for the British during World War I for use in the noisy and windy environment of aircraft cockpits. Over a 3 year period from 1915-1918 they went through a series of prototype and production handheld "airplane telephones" before arriving at a hands free throat mic incorporated into a leather flying helmet.

=== World War II – full body suits ===
During World War II, German Luftwaffe pilots and panzer crews used throat microphones. Soon after, they were adopted by the Allied air forces—the USAAF with the T-20 and T-30 and the RAF with the Mark II. Later, Soviet pilots relied on LA-3 and LA-5 models.

=== Scientific studies ===
Starting in the 1970s, researchers explored the use of throat microphones in speech therapy.

=== Current use ===
Throat microphones have maintained their presence in the military, law enforcement, and emergency services. Newer single-transducer designs are available that make the throat microphone much more comfortable to wear than earlier units and also better balance transmission quality. Additionally, this next generation of throat microphones provides varying outputs and frequency responses to accommodate a wide variety of professional communication devices such as digital and analog portable radios and Terrestrial Trunked Radio (TETRA) and P25 systems.

Several throat microphones including wireless throat mics now exist for mobile devices. Mobile device apps are starting to allow further customisation for end-user applications. Consumer uses such as for airsoft competitions and motorcycle riding are increasingly more popular. During the COVID-19 pandemic, the higher rate of face mask usage led to throat mics becoming more common to facilitate communications.

== See also ==
- Noise-cancelling headphones
- Noise-canceling microphone
- Subvocal recognition
- Leather flying helmet
- Flight helmet
