= Contact microphone =

Microphone that works through contact with solid objects

A contact microphone is a form of microphone that senses audio vibrations through contact with solid objects. Unlike normal air microphones, contact microphones are almost completely insensitive to air vibrations but transduce only structure-borne sound. Often used as acoustic leakage probes, they also enjoy wide usage by electroacoustic music artists experimenting with sound. Contact microphones can be used to amplify sound from acoustic musical instruments, to sense drum hits, for triggering electronic samples, and to record sound in challenging environments, such as underwater under high pressure.

== Piezoelectric contact microphones ==
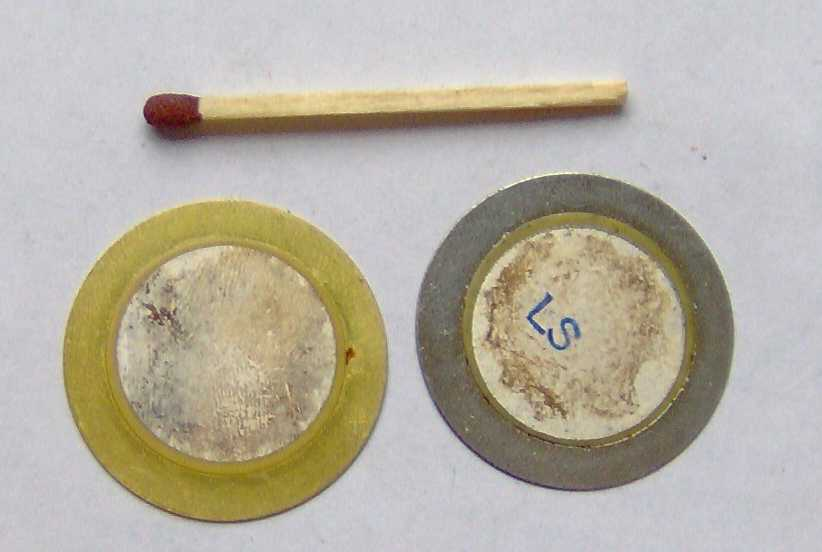
Piezo ceramic on metal disc

A piezoelectric sensor is the most commonly available contact microphone. It is made of a thin piezoelectric ceramic disc glued to a thin brass or alloy metal disc (see image). The voltage produced from the sound vibrations can be measured across them. Contact microphones based on piezoelectric materials are passive and high-impedance, and they sound tinny without a matching preamp.

Instead of being used as a microphone, they alternatively may be used to produce sound (typically used as the buzzer in computer motherboards) by sending voltages to them.

== Coil-based contact microphones ==
Moving coil microphone contact microphones operate by suspending a coil of wire within a magnetic field or alternatively by suspending a magnet above a fixed coil, to induce a signal directly from the object's vibrations.

== See also ==
- Throat microphone
