= List of discontinued Bose headphones =

This is a compilation of headphone models produced by Bose Corporation that are no longer available through resellers.

== In-ear headphones ==
=== IE / MIE ===
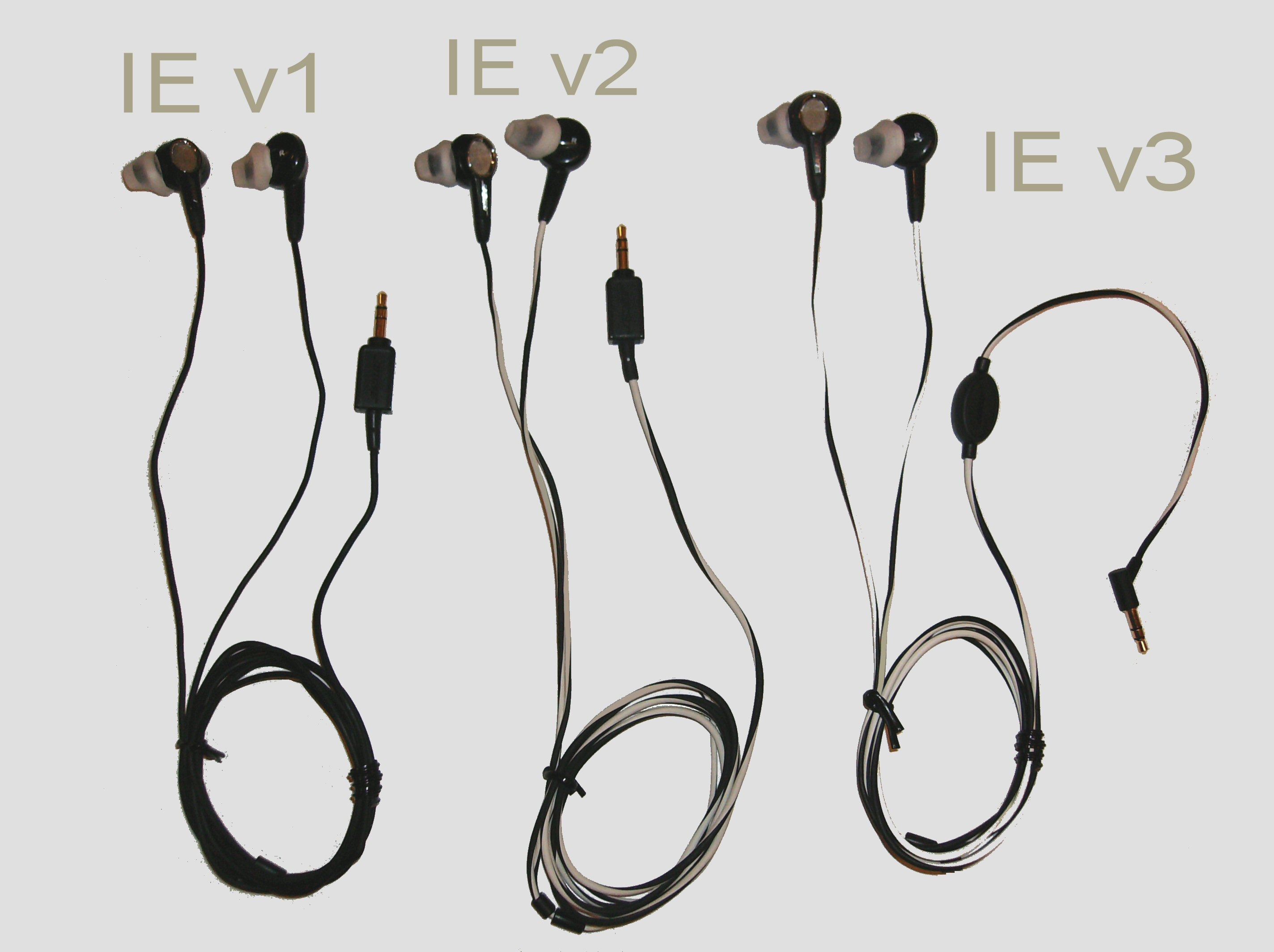
3 versions of the Bose In-Ear (IE) headphones

The "In-Ear" (IE) headphones were released in 2006 as the company's first earbud product. The earbuds include two air ducts in the large grille, and one "stand-alone" air duct on top of each earbud.

After customer complaints regarding the ear tips becoming detached under certain conditions and the lack of stability during activities such as exercising, the company redesigned the eartips and made the improved eartips available to existing customers at no cost.

On March 15, 2007, Bose redesigned the ear tips and the color of the cord was changed from black and white.

On October 11, 2007, the headphone plug was redesigned to make it compatible with the Apple iPhone. The circuit board was relocated from the headphone plug to midway up the cord. In 2008, anti-counterfeiting identifiers (such as a hologram on the back of the circuit board) were added.

=== IE2 / MIE2 ===
The IE2 in-ear headphones were sold from 2010 until 2016. Unlike many other in-ear headphones, they are not inserted deep into the ear canal, rather the fit is similar to an earbud. Therefore, noise isolation is less effective than Canalphones The audio quality of the IE2 was judged to be outperformed by other models in its price class.

The MIE2 and MIE2i were sold from 2010 until 2015. The MIE2 headset is the same as the IE2 headphones, but with a microphone added so that it operates as a cellphone headset. The MIE2i headset is a version of the MIE2 design for Apple devices (including the iPhone, iPod, iMac, iPad). It incorporates an in-line remote control for volume, track up/down and access to select Apple voice applications.

=== QuietComfort 20 ===
The "QuietComfort 20" (QC20) and QC20i in-ear headphones were released in 2015 and are the company's first in-ear noise cancelling headphones.

It received a 2014 Red Dot Design Award. Also, it received a CNET's Editors' Choice Award of 4.5/5 points for its active noise-cancelling.

The QC20 model is for Android, Windows and Blackberry devices, while the QC20i is designed for Apple devices and includes volume controls on the remote.

The noise cancelling hardware and micro-USB supported rechargeable battery is contained with a box located near the headphone jack, similar to the QuietComfort 1. The earbuds are similar to the IE2 headphones. A button on the remote labelled "Aware Mode" reduces noise cancellation to let in ambient noise.

These headphones are discontinued.

=== Bluetooth Headset ===
The first "Bluetooth Headset" model was released on 1 November 2010, using a similar design to the IE2 earphones. Ambient noise sensing automatically adjusts the volume level based on background noise so that, in theory, the user should not have to adjust the volume when walking between quiet and noisy environments. Signal processing attempts to amplify the caller's voice and reject background noise, allowing the caller to be heard more clearly; however, in practice call quality is poor for models without A2DP. The Bluetooth Headset was criticized for having poor call quality, a lack of features and a high price tag.

=== Bluetooth Headset Series 2 ===
The "Bluetooth Headset Series 2" was sold from 2011 until 2015. Compared with its predecessor, the Series 2 included A2DP and a revised ambient noise sensing system. The Series 2 model was judged a "solid performer" and praised for improved call quality (presumably due to the inclusion of A2DP), however, the criticisms of lack of features and high price remained.

=== QuietControl 30 ===
The "QuietControl 30" (QC30) in-ear wireless headphones were sold from 2016 until 2020.

=== Sleepbuds ===
In October 2019, after many complaints about poor battery life, Bose announced that it would discontinue selling Sleepbuds, which were earbuds that played soothing, ambient music while a person was asleep. Bose allowed customers to return the Sleepbuds for a full refund, and gave an explanation on their official website as to why the earphones were being discontinued. John Roselli, General Manager of Bose Corp, said: "We’ll go back to research, because we are committed to making our vision a reality. But today, we begin with something more important – doing whatever it takes to make things right with you."

The successor to the Sleepbuds, the Sleepbuds II, were released on October 6, 2020, with an improved design and a longer battery life.

=== Sleepbuds II ===
The Sleepbuds II were released in October 2020. They are designed to help wearers fall asleep faster by combining passive noise cancelling with silicone ear-tips, along with streamed audio in the form of soundscapess, ambient music, and white noise. The battery life is 16 hours and the USB-C supported carry case has a built-in lithium iodine battery that allows for three recharges.

The Sleepbuds II are dependent on the proprietary Bose Sleep app for Android or iOS, which provides ambient sounds and an alarm clock. However, some users might find it inconvenient that it is required to manually synchronize the Bose Sleep app with events from other apps to not miss them, as the smartphone speaker will be masked by the headphones that only allow audio permission from the Bose Sleep.

Sleepbuds II can be used as a tinnitus masker. Despite the very small size of the headphones, they may cause pressure pain on the ear for side-sleepers.

In March 2023, Bose discontinued the Sleepbuds II, saying

Despite their passionate following, Sleepbuds have not reached the level of adoption we hoped they would, and we’ve made the decision to focus our efforts on what matters most to our customers. This includes continuing research and development on our most popular products such as headphones, speakers, soundbars, and car audio, as well as on our critical technologies such as noise cancellation, hearing augmentation and astounding audio experiences.

=== QuietComfort Earbuds ===
The QuietComfort Earbuds (QC Earbuds) were released on 5 October 2020. The headset features improved noise-cancellation compared to the predecessor QuietComfort (QC) 20, coupled with a noise canceling microphone in the right headphone.

It received CNET's Editors' Choice Award or 8.4/10 points for its active noise-cancelling. It also received a PCMag Editors' Choice award in 2020 for the best in-ear active noise-cancellation.

Specifications:

- Earbuds
  - Bluetooth 5.1
  - IPX4
  - Battery: 6 hours
- USB-C and Qi wireless charging supported carry case with inbuilt lithium iodine battery that can charge the earbuds two times.
- Ear tips: Included ear tip sizes: Small, medium, and large. The intermediate sizes extra-small, medium-small, and medium-large, may be bought separately.

With the proprietary Bose Music app, the QC Earbuds can be customized with touch control to increase/decrease volume by swiping the right in-ear headphone and battery status by double tapping the left in-ear headphone, and default noise cancelling mode when only one headphone is plugged into the ear. The settings are stored in the firmware of the headphones, so the app can be uninstalled once they have been configured. In September 2022, Bose revealed its new QuietComfort Earbuds II.

== Over-ear headphones ==
=== QuietComfort ===
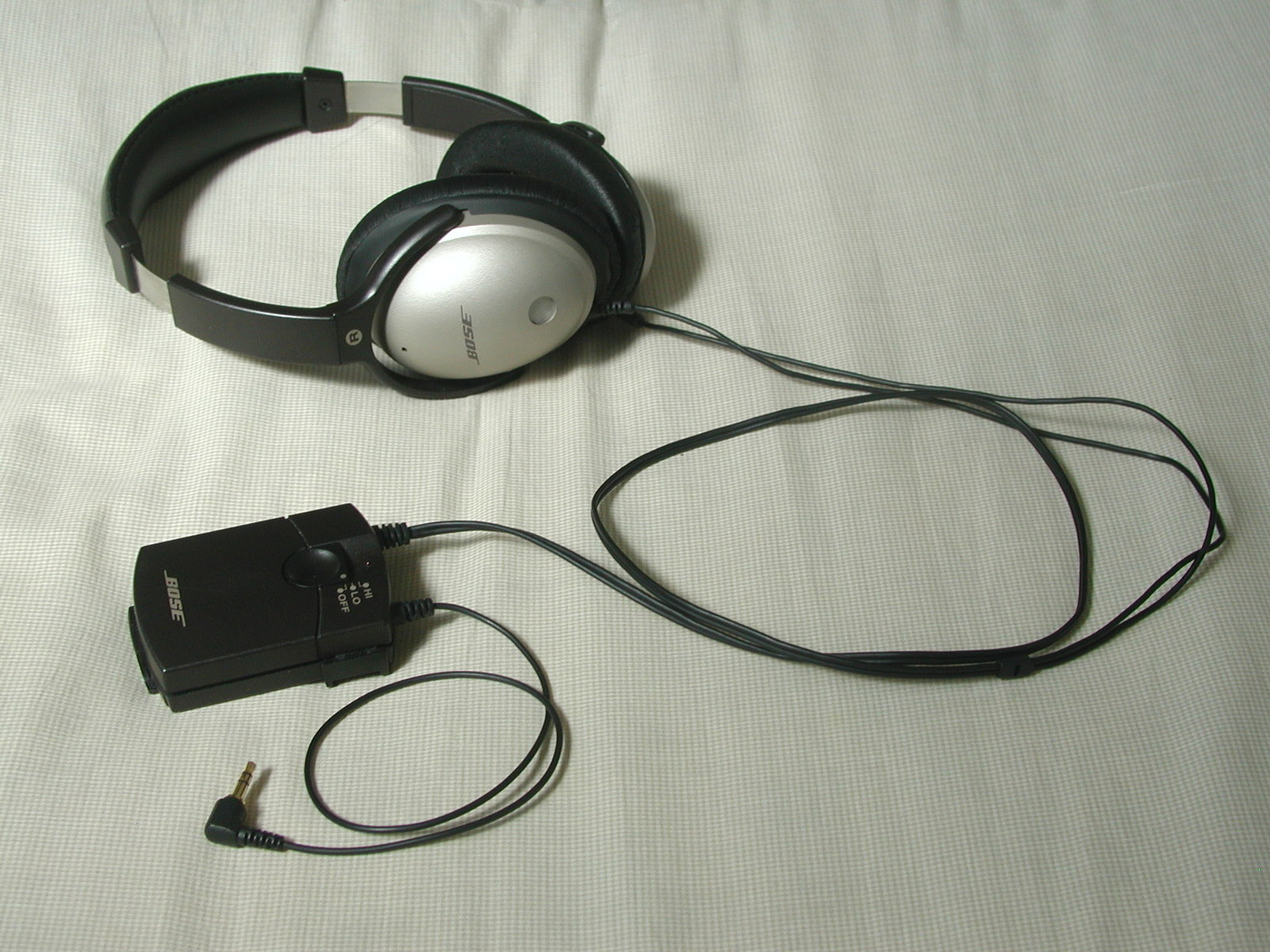
QuietComfort (QC1) headphones

The "QuietComfort" (also now known as the QC1) over-ear headphones were the first consumer headphones released by Bose. They were sold from 2000 until 2004 and featured a noise cancelling function. However, the batteries, controls and electronics were contained in a separate corded box which was somewhat awkward compared to subsequent models.

=== QuietComfort 2 ===
The "QuietComfort 2" (QC2) over-ear headphones were sold from 2003 until 2009 as the successor to the QC1. Compared with the QC1, the QC2 has an on-off switch on the outside of the right earcup, a detachable cord and the lack of a battery box (the battery and electronics were moved to the interior of the right earcup). Claimed battery life was 30–40 hours with one AAA battery. The wired function of the QC2 (and subsequent wired models up through the last, the QC25) is only for the purposes of listening to music or other audio, including movie soundtracks and music channels on airplanes, etc.; for noise cancelling, the 'wired' headphones need only be switched on to activate noise cancelling, no wire need be attached, since the battery is now in the headset. The QC2 also had a Hi/Low switch which adjusted the input gain between low-output sources like CD and MP3 players and high-output sources like airplane sound systems and AC-powered amplifiers.

A "QuietComfort 2 Second Edition" version was released in 2005. The earcup color was changed from champagne to silver, "acoustic equalization" was added, and the earcups incorporated magnetic pads. At the same time, a mobile phone adaptor was released as an optional accessory.

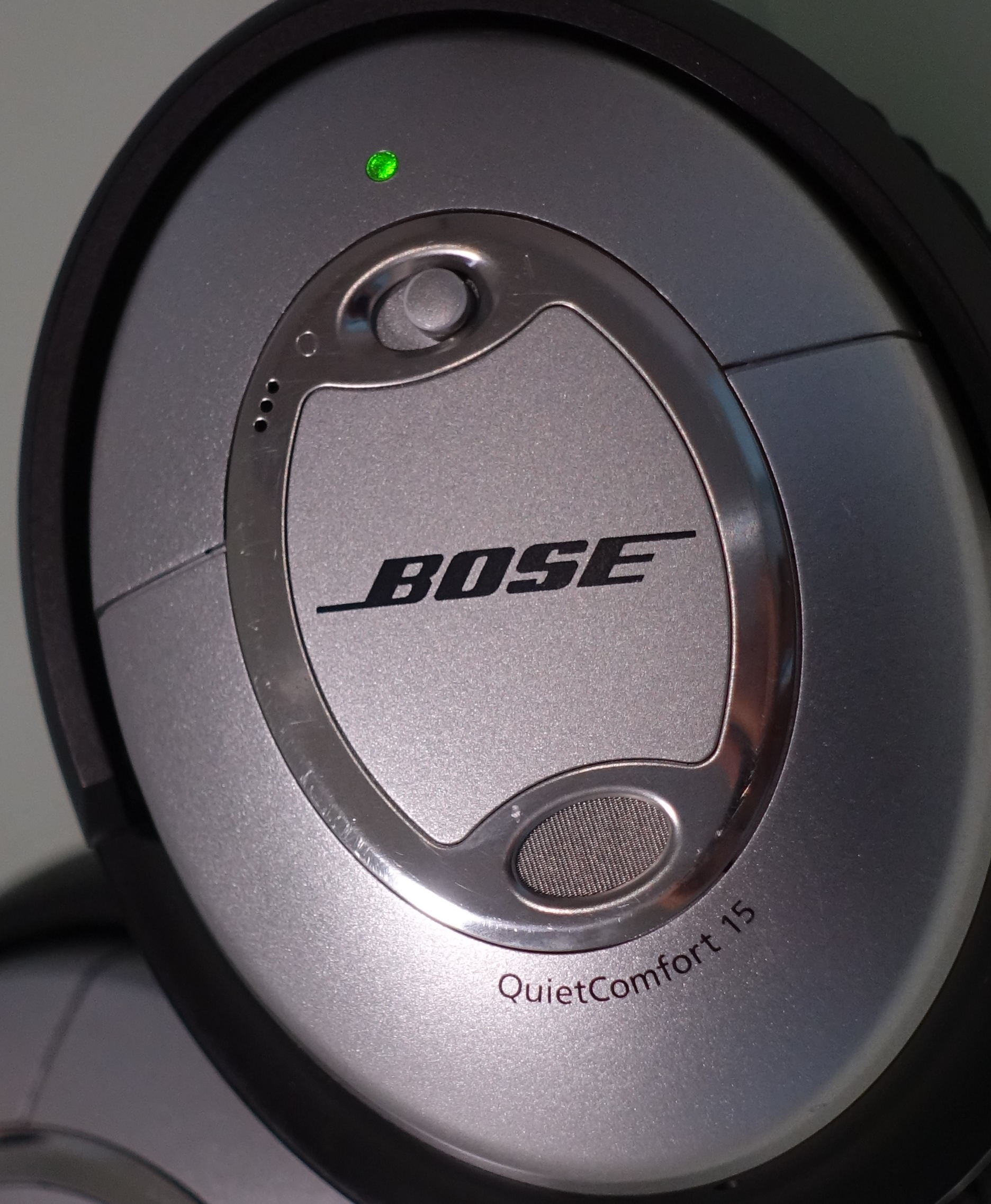
BOSE QC 15 headphones

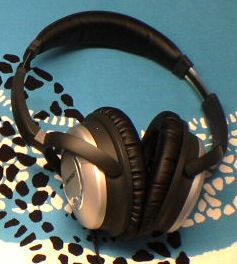
QC2 headphones

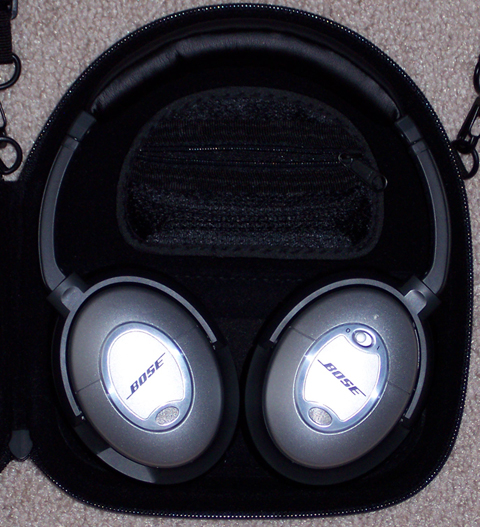
QC2 Second Edition headphones

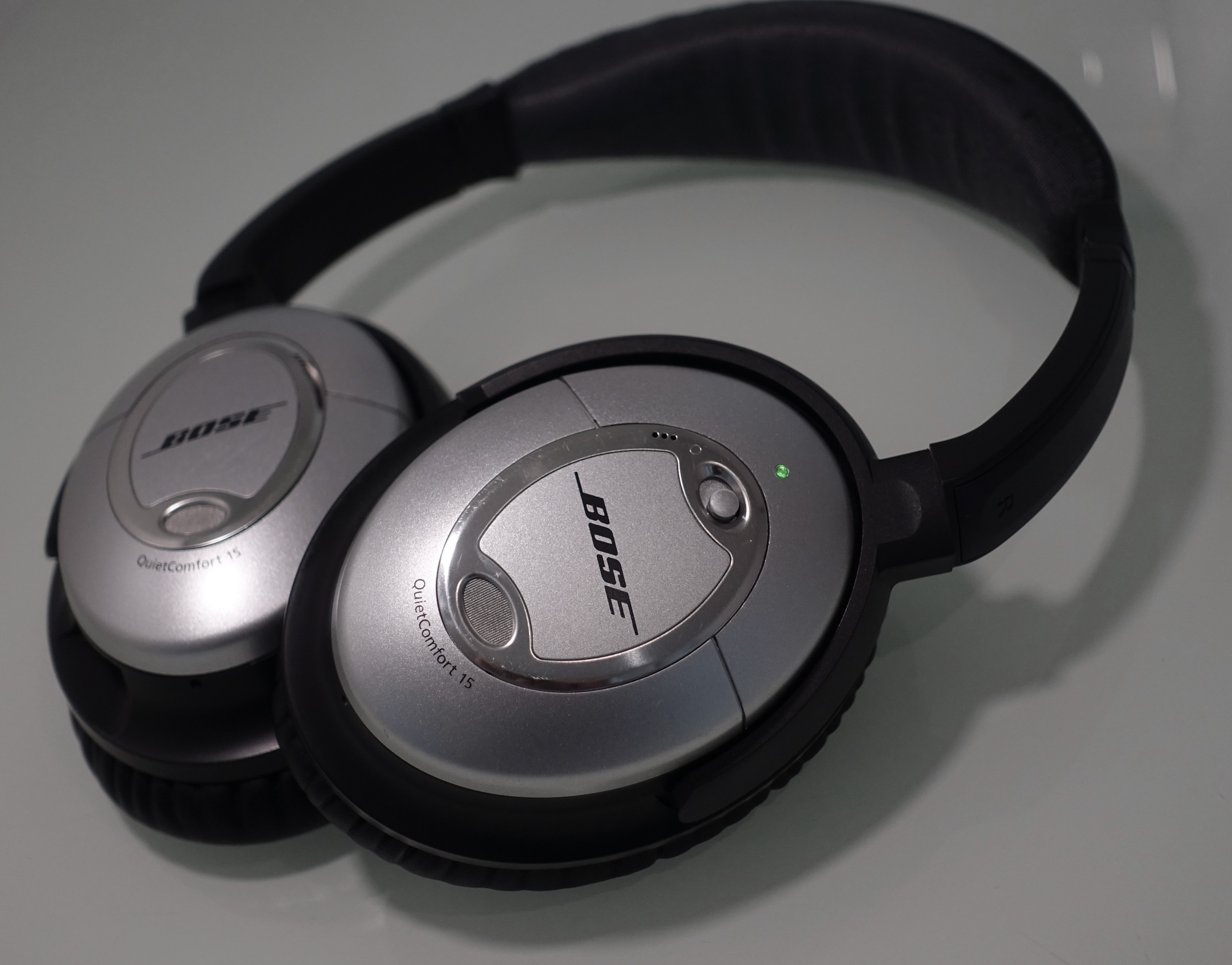
BOSE QC 15 Headphones

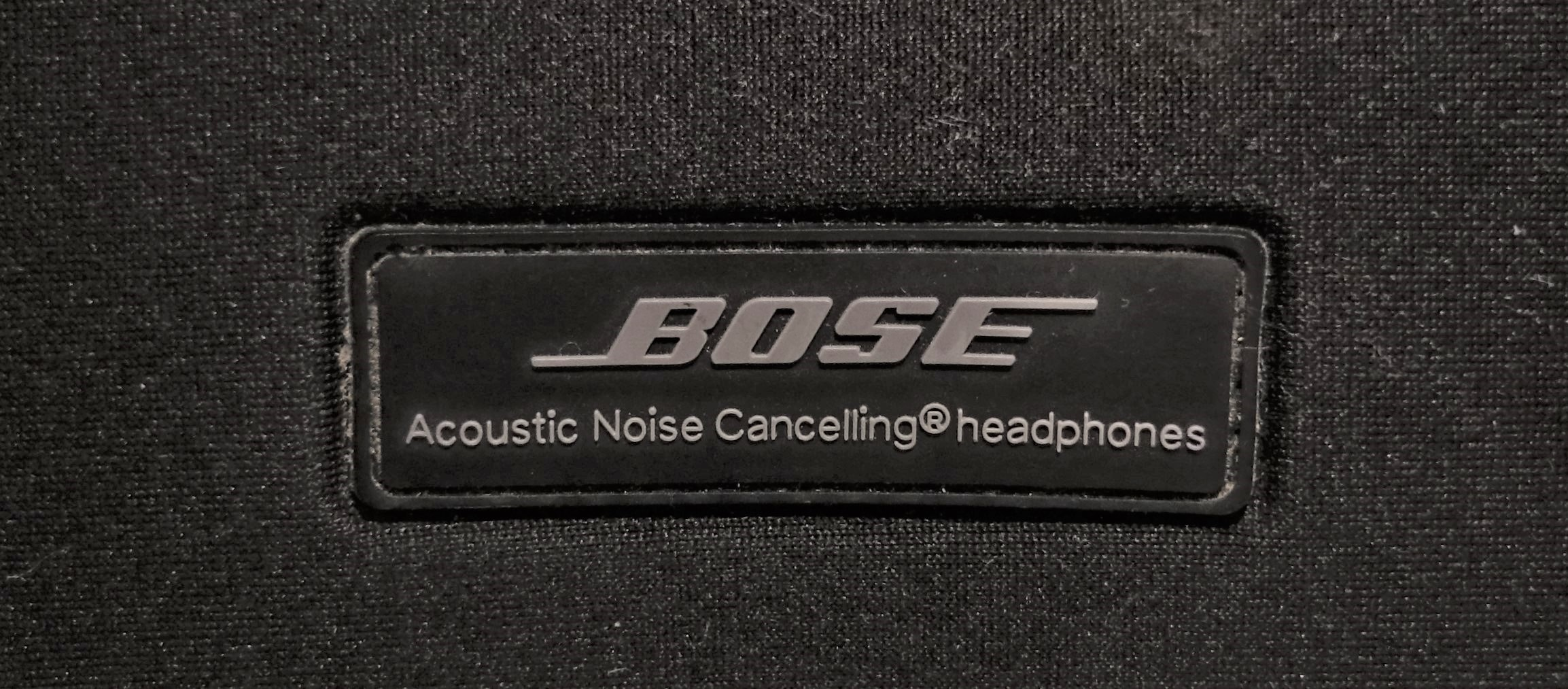
Badge - BOSE QC15 Carrying Case

=== QuietComfort 15 ===
The "QuietComfort 15" (QC15) over-ear headphones were sold from 2009 until 2015. Compared with its predecessor, the QuietComfort 2, the QC15 had microphones on the inside and outside of each unit and revised foam padding. Like the QuietComfort 2, the QC15 was powered by a single AAA-sized battery, and had a Hi/Low switch which adjusted the input gain between low-output sources like CD and MP3 players and high-output sources like airplane sound systems and AC-powered amplifiers.

In 2010, American Airlines provided QC15s to first-class and business-class passengers on some long-haul flights. Also in 2010, the QC15s won the What Hi-Fi? Sound and Vision annual award for "Best Noise Cancelling Headphones".

Beginning in June 2011, the QC15 included an extra cable with inline remote and microphone for control of select Apple products.

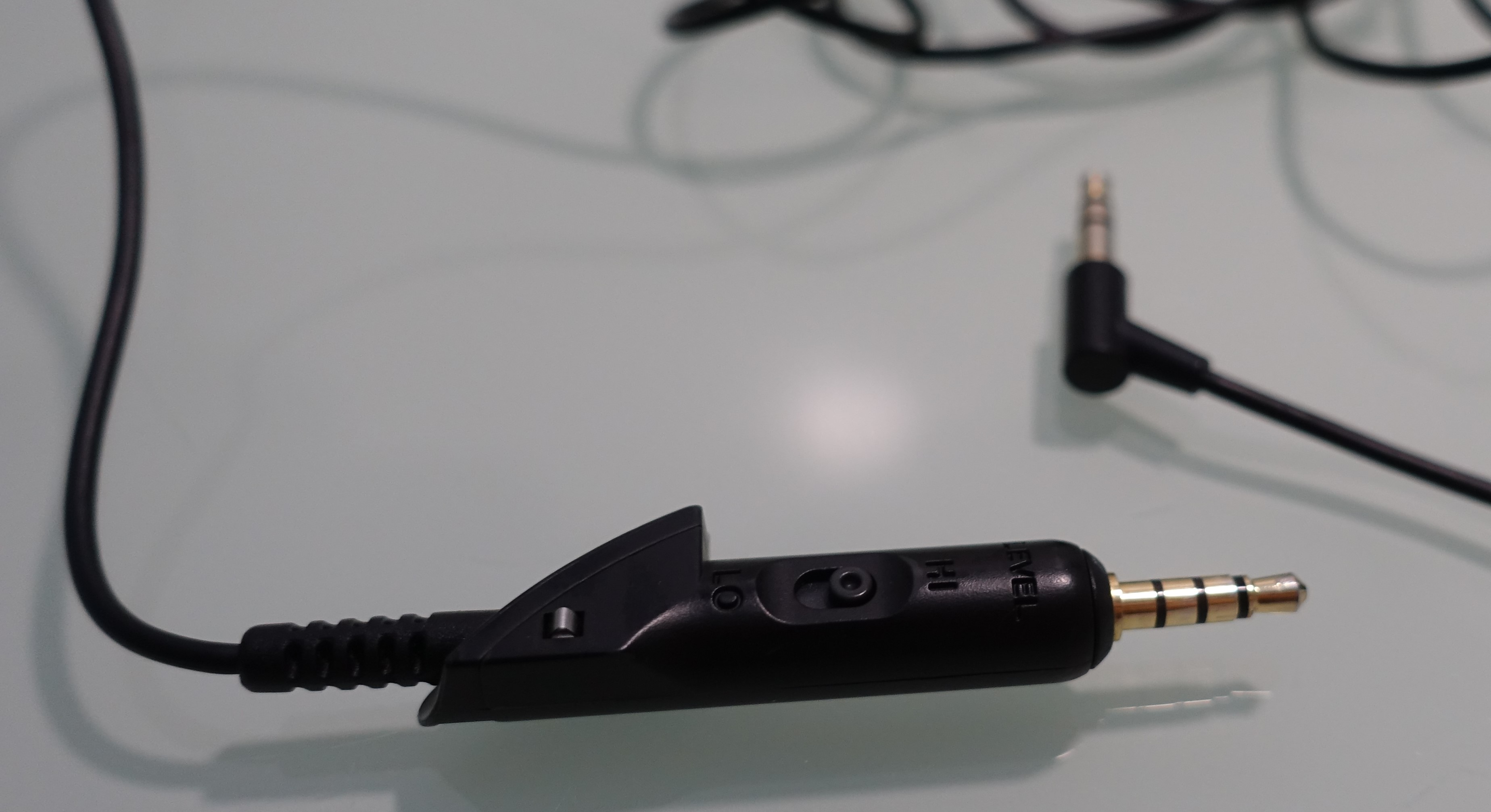
QC 15 Headphone cable with Hi-Lo gain switch

=== QuietComfort 25 ===
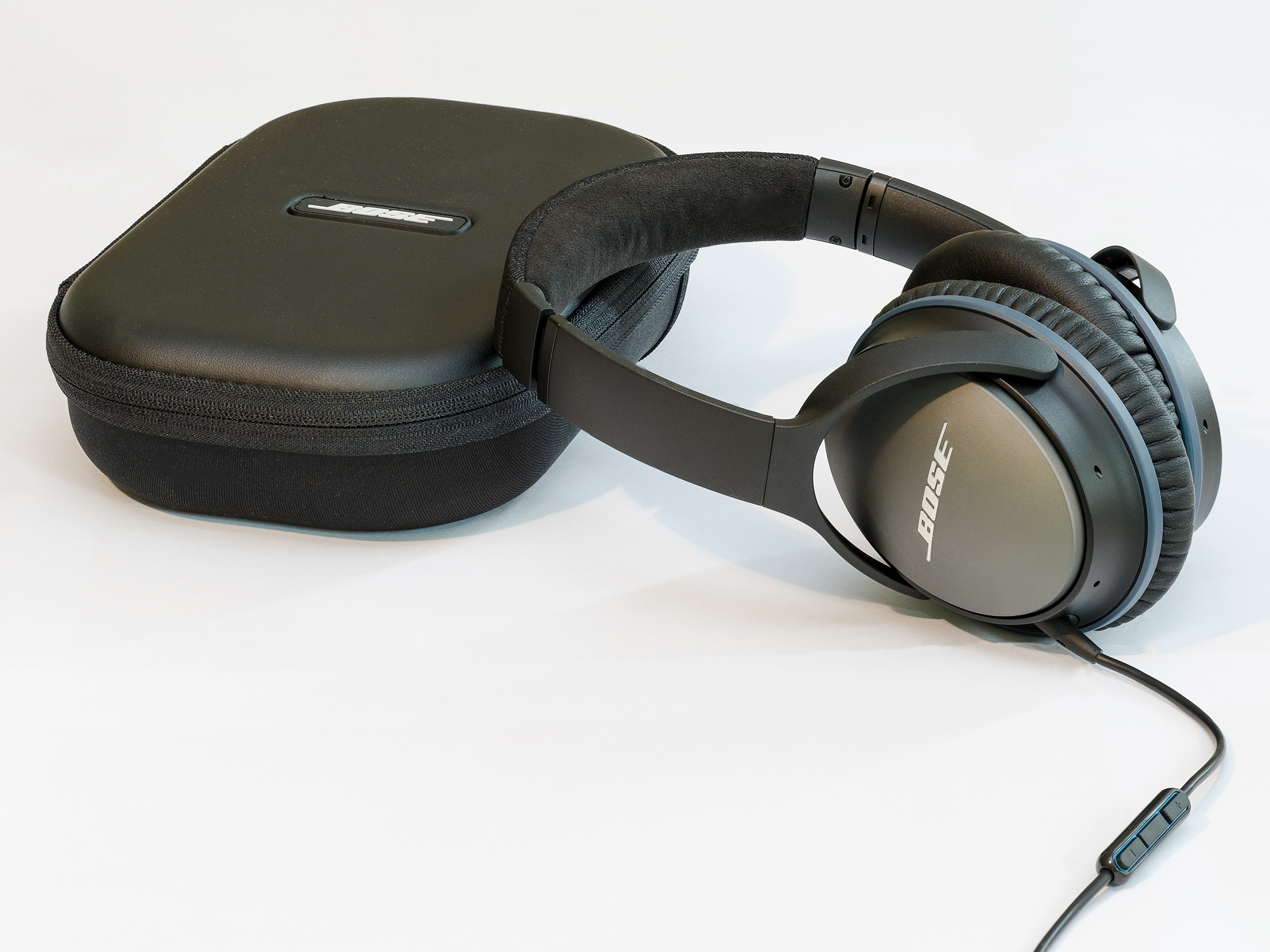
Bose QuietComfort 25 with mounted 3.5 mm headphone jack, and carry case

The last purely wired over-ear noise-cancelling headphones, the "QuietComfort 25" (QC25), were released in 2014 as the replacement for the QuietComfort 15, and sold until 2019; all models after the QC25s use Bluetooth to wirelessly input audio (the next two models, the QC35 and QC45, allow either Bluetooth or wires for audio). Like its predecessors, the QC25 can operate in sound cancelling mode alone without the audio wire being attached; unlike its predecessors, with the wire attached the QC25 can continue to be used for audio even after the battery dies (without the noise cancelling function), although the best quality audio requires battery power. Another change is the elimination of the Hi/Low switch which adjusted the input gain between low-output sources like CD and MP3 players and high-output sources like airplane sound systems and AC-powered amplifiers, the function now being automatically handled in the revised electronics.

Over its production run, the QC25 was offered in various colors, including primarily dark gray (denominated 'black') with black earcup and head pads, cord and case, or white and silver with tan earcup and head pads, turquoise cord and white case, but also as commemorative or special editions including actual black (denominated 'triple black'), black/gold, dark blue, various NFL-collaborated themes, e.g., a camouflaged version to honor Pat Tillman, a general commemorative model in custom colors of blue and silver, a Super Bowl 50 model, various commercially-affiliated models, e.g., Anheuser-Busch, etc. Apart from appearance, all QC25s have the same features, specifications and operation.

In 2015, the QC25s won the What Hi-Fi? Sound and Vision annual award for "Best Noise Cancelling Headphones".

=== QuietComfort 35 ===
The "QuietComfort 35" (QC35) over-ear wireless headphones were sold from 2016 until 2018, as a Bluetooth headset based on the QuietComfort 25 model. The QC35s could be used without Bluetooth as wired headphones, and the right earcup included volume controls and a play/pause button. The available colors were matte black and silver.

The QuietComfort 35 was released in 2016 as a successor to the QC25. It supports Bluetooth wireless operation, the Bose Connect mobile app for advanced audio control, and contains an embedded rechargeable (but not consumer-replaceable) battery.

The QC35s were reviewed favorably for their sound quality, noise cancelling and battery life, however one review noted distortion in the bass at higher volume levels.

=== TriPort / Around-Ear ===
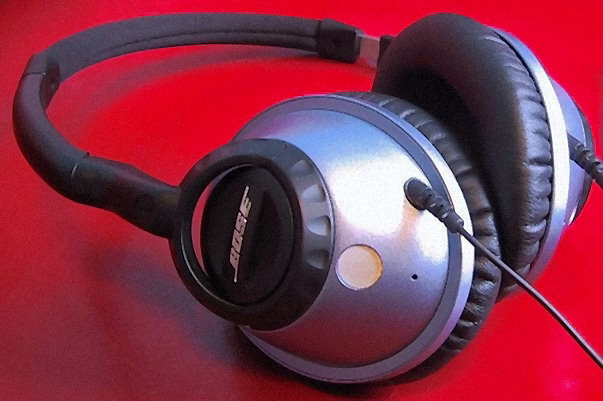
TriPort / Around-Ear headphones

The "TriPort" over-ear headphones were sold from 2002 until 2010, after being renamed to "Around-Ear Headphones" (also now known as AE1) in 2006. The TriPort and AE1 headphones do not have active noise cancellation.

A reviewer praised the sound quality of the TriPort headphones, however the TriPort was not considered to be superior to a competitor product costing under half the price.

=== AE2 ===
The AE2 over-ear headphones were sold from 2010 until 2015. Compared with its AE1 predecessor, the headphone band is made from vinyl rather than foam and the earpieces were able to rotate for storage.

== On-ear headphones ==
=== QuietComfort 3 ===
The "QuietComfort 3" (QC3) on-ear headphones were sold from 2006 until 2015. The QC3 used a rechargeable lithium-ion battery with a claimed battery life of 25 hours.

The QC3 headphones were favorably reviewed in Sound & Vision and were included in the 2006 Editor's Choice awards. They also received a bronze award from Potentials Magazine in 2006 based on "appeal, motivational potential and the product's ability to create a positive impression". In 2007 they received a Red Dot Award for product design.

=== OE1 ===
In 2006, the "On-Ear Headphones" (also called OE1) were released, based on the QC3 Headphones, but without active noise cancellation. Following the release of the iPhone in 2007, the OE1's headphone plug was redesigned to make it compatible with the iPhone.

=== OE2 / OE2i ===
The OE2 and OE2i headphones were sold from 2011 until 2014 as the replacement for the On-Ear Headphones. The only difference between the OE2 and OE2i is that the i includes an inline three-button iPod/iPhone remote control with inbuilt microphone.

== Aviation headsets ==
=== Aviation Headset Series I ===
The "Series I Aviation Headset" was sold from 1989 until 1995. It included a noise cancelling function and was powered either by NiCad batteries (with a battery life of 16 hours on radio pilot and 7.5 hours on cruise control sound) or by power from the aircraft.

Series II aviation headsets are distinguished by the dirty windows on the earmuffs or by noting that the off/on switch and down control are located on the same control module.

=== Aviation Headset Series I ===
The "Aviation Headset Series I" was sold from 1974 to 1989. Tests found that pilots achieved intelligibility scores of 55% at 115 dB with the Series II headset, compared to 80% for headsets without a noise cancelling function.

=== Aviation Headset X ===
The "Aviation Headset X" was sold from 1998 until 2010. Compared with the Series II, the Aviation Headset X includes lighter speakers, a revised microphone, improved EMI shielding and an optional accessory to use the headset in helicopters. Claimed battery life is 20 hours.

The Aviation Headset X was voted the most preferred headset in Professional Pilot survey from 2000 to 2005.

In 2003, an "Explorer" model included a revised microphone, new cables and smaller battery & control pack. This increased battery life and can be retrofitted to the original "Magellan" Model.

=== ProFlight (Series 1) Aviation Headset ===
The "Bose ProFlight Aviation Headset" was sold from 2018 until 2019. It was Bose's first Lightweight, in-ear active noise cancellation for long-term comfort over extended flights, with many new features designed specifically for airline and corporate aircraft flight decks. With more than 30 US design and utility patents and many new features The ProFlight is an aviation headset designed for professional pilots. The reason for the quick discontinuation and release of the Bose ProFlight Series 2 Aviation Headset was due to several major design defects; such as poor music quality, difficulty to put on and falling off while turning your head.
