= Noise-cancelling headphones =

Headphones with active noise control

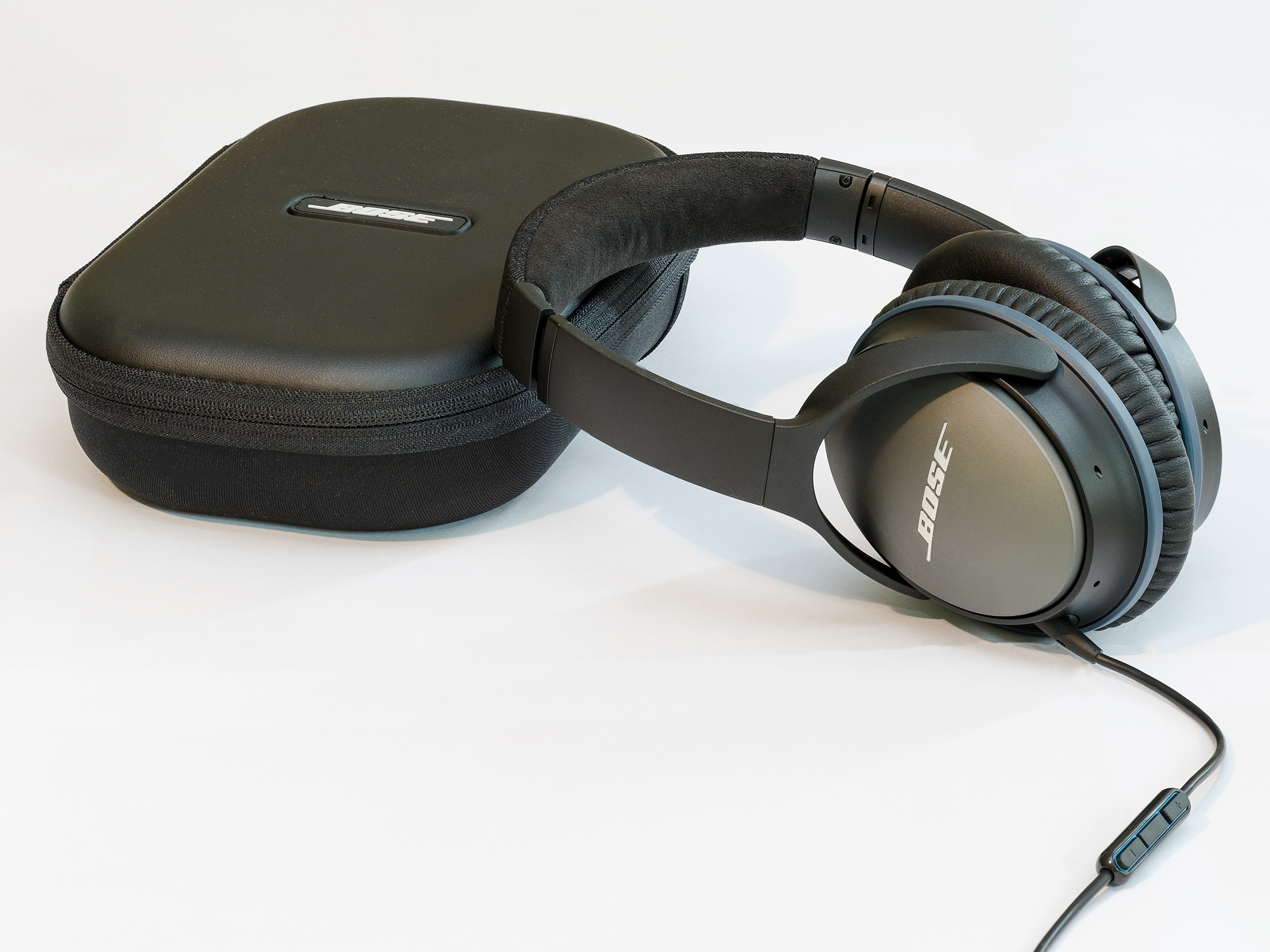
Noise-cancelling headphones alongside a carry case

Noise-cancelling headphones are headphones that reduce unwanted ambient sounds using active noise control (ANC), a technology that electronically minimizes external noise by generating sound waves that interfere destructively with incoming sounds. They are commonly used in environments with persistent background noise, including aircraft cabins, trains, offices, industrial workplaces, and urban environments.

Noise-cancelling headphones differ from traditional passive noise-isolating headphones by actively reducing low-frequency environmental sounds rather than relying solely on physical insulation. While passive isolation blocks sound through earcup padding or in-ear seals, active noise cancellation uses microphones, amplifiers, and digital signal processing to detect surrounding sound and produce an inverse waveform intended to cancel the incoming noise before it reaches the listener's ears.

== History ==
The concept of active noise control dates to the early 20th century. In 1936, German physicist Paul Lueg patented a theoretical system for cancelling sound waves through destructive interference. Early applications of the technology were limited by the capabilities of analog electronics and signal processing systems available at the time.

During the 1950s and 1960s, researchers began exploring active noise reduction for aviation and industrial use. The technology became especially important for pilots and aircraft crews operating in high-noise environments where prolonged exposure could damage hearing and interfere with communication.

Modern consumer noise-cancelling headphones emerged during the 1980s. Bose Corporation became one of the first companies to successfully commercialize ANC headphone technology after founder Amar Bose reportedly became dissatisfied with aircraft cabin noise while on a flight. Bose introduced aviation-focused ANC headsets before later releasing consumer-oriented QuietComfort headphones, which helped popularize the technology among travelers and general consumers.

During the 2000s and 2010s, improvements in battery technology, digital signal processing, wireless communication, and miniaturization led to rapid growth in the consumer ANC market. Companies including Sony, Apple, Sennheiser, AKG, and Beats Electronics released increasingly advanced noise-cancelling headphones and earbuds.

== Technology ==
Most modern ANC headphones use either feedforward, feedback, or hybrid microphone systems. Feedforward systems place microphones on the outside of the earcups to monitor environmental noise before it reaches the ear, while feedback systems place microphones inside the earcup to analyze sound reaching the listener. Hybrid systems combine both methods to improve cancellation performance across a wider range of frequencies.

The technology is generally most effective at reducing constant low-frequency sounds such as aircraft engines, air conditioning systems, road noise, and train rumble. Sudden or irregular sounds, including speech, alarms, or nearby conversations, are more difficult to eliminate, though modern digital processing systems have improved performance significantly.

Many modern noise-cancelling headphones also include adaptive ANC systems that automatically adjust noise reduction levels depending on the surrounding environment. Additional features commonly include Bluetooth connectivity, voice assistant integration, touch-sensitive controls, spatial audio support, and transparency or ambient modes that intentionally allow outside sounds to pass through for safety and awareness.

== Uses ==
Noise-cancelling headphones are widely used in commercial aviation, where they help reduce fatigue and improve communication clarity for passengers and flight crews. Pilots frequently use specialized aviation headsets equipped with ANC to reduce cockpit engine noise and improve radio intelligibility.

The technology has also become common among commuters and travelers using trains, buses, and subways, where continuous environmental noise may interfere with listening or concentration. In offices and educational settings, noise-cancelling headphones are frequently used to reduce distractions and improve focus during work or study.

Research has suggested that ANC headphones may improve concentration, listening comprehension, and multitasking performance in noisy environments. The headphones are therefore widely used by students, remote workers, programmers, gamers, and content creators.

In industrial and military applications, active noise control technology is sometimes incorporated into hearing protection systems to reduce prolonged exposure to hazardous noise while preserving the ability to hear important communications and warning signals.

== Health and safety ==
There is a general danger that listening to loud music in headphones can distract the listener and lead to injury and accidents. Noise-cancelling headphones add extra risk. Several countries and states have made it illegal to wear headphones while driving or cycling.

It is not uncommon to get a pressure-like feeling when using noise-cancelling headphones initially. This is caused by the lack of low-frequency sounds being perceived as a pressure differential between the inner and outer ear.

== Theory ==
Simplified graphical depiction of active noise reduction

To cancel the lower-frequency portions of the noise, noise-cancelling headphones use active noise control. A microphone captures the targeted ambient sounds, and a small amplifier generates sound waves that are exactly out of phase with the undesired sounds. When the sound pressure of the noise wave is high, the cancelling wave is low (and vice versa). The opposite sound waves collide and are eliminated or "cancelled" (destructive interference). Most noise-cancelling headsets in the consumer market generate the noise-cancelling waveform in real time with analog technology. In contrast, other active noise and vibration control products use soft real-time digital processing. According to an experiment conducted to test how lightweight earphones reduced noise as compared to commercial headphones and earphones, lightweight headphones achieved better noise reduction than normal headphones. The experiment also supported that in-ear headphones worked better at reducing noise than outer-ear headphones.

Cancellation focuses on constant droning sounds like road noise and is less effective on short/sharp sounds like voices or breaking glass. It also is ineffective in eliminating higher frequency noises like the sound of spraying. Noise-cancelling headphones often combine sound isolation with ANC to maximize the sound reduction across the frequency spectrum. Noise cancellation can also be used without sound isolation to make wanted sounds (such as voices) easier to hear. Noise cancellation to eliminate ambient noise is never passive because of the circuitry required, so references to passive noise cancellation actually are referring to products featuring sound isolation.

To prevent higher-frequency noise from reaching the ear, most noise-cancelling headphones depend on sound isolation or soundproofing. Higher-frequency sound has a shorter wavelength, and cancelling this sound would require locating devices to detect and counteract it closer to the listener's eardrum than is currently technically feasible or would require digital algorithms that would complicate the headphone's electronics.

Noise-cancelling headphones specify the amount of noise they can cancel in terms of decibels. This number may be useful for comparing products but does not tell the whole story, as it does not specify noise reduction at various frequencies.

== In aviation ==
By the 1950s, Lawrence J. Fogel created systems and submitted patents regarding active noise cancellation in the field of aviation. This system was designed to reduce noise for the pilots in the cockpit area and help make their communication easier and protect hearing. Fogel is considered to be the inventor of active noise cancellation, and he designed one of the first noise-cancelling headphones systems. Later on, Willard Meeker designed an active noise control model that was applied to circumaural earmuffs for advanced hearing protection. Noise-cancelling aviation headsets are now commonly available.

In 1984, German audio equipment manufacturer Sennheiser was asked by Lufthansa Airlines, a German airline company, to develop a pilot headset which could reduce the hearing loss, stress, and interference associated with the constant noise of aviation cockpits. In response, Sennheiser developed its patented NoiseGard technology, a flagship ANC software of its time. In 1987, the Sennheiser LHM-45 headset launched, and was the first ANC headset to obtain U.S. Federal Aviation Association's (FAA) Technical Standard Orders (TSO) certification to authorize mass-manufacturing for American aviation markets.

Bose was founded in 1964 by Dr. Amar Bose following difficulties getting a company to license his research in acoustics. The company would begin developing and releasing speaker systems in the late 1960s and 1970s. Then on April 19, 1978, Dr. Bose while aboard a flight was given a pair of electrodynamic headphones designed to make listening to music earlier and drown out airplane noise. Disappointed with the results, he came up with a design for Active Noise Cancelling.

By 1989, Bose introduced its Aviation Headset Series I, which is claimed as the first commercially available ANC headset, although dates of commercial availability are disputed between 1986 and 1989. On the first flight to navigate the entire globe without refueling, pilots Jeana Yeager and Dick Rutan wore prototype ANC headsets for pilots developed by Bose in 1986. In the 1990s, Bose became the first company to partner with the United States Army, supplying them with ANC headphones to boost communication and protect the hearing of its pilots.

Several airlines provide noise-cancelling headphones in their business and first-class cabins. Bose started supplying American Airlines with noise-cancelling headphones in 1999 and started offering the Quiet Comfort line for the general consumer in 2000. Met with an overwhelmingly positive response, Bose would begin selling their headphones directly to consumers.

== Sensory protection ==
Aside from its role in communication and occupational health, ANC is used to protect wearers from lower levels of noise that still impact people sensitive to noise.

Noise-cancellation headphones have been used as sleeping aids. Both passive isolating and active noise-cancellation headphones or earplugs help to achieve a reduction of ambient sounds, which is particularly helpful for people suffering from insomnia or other sleeping disorders, for whom sounds such as cars honking and snoring impact their ability to sleep. For that reason, noise-cancelling sleep headphones and earplugs are designed to cater to this segment of patients. Recently, so-called "loop earplugs" have also become available, which are designed to allow conversation to continue.

Noise-cancelling headphones have been provided for patients in intensive care units to reduce the noise exposure they face while in a hospital environment. Active noise control technology has been shown to reduce noise exposure, which is associated with sleep disturbance, delirium, and morbidity.

Many neurodivergent people, particularly autistic people or people with ADHD, are sensitive to everyday noises, and benefit from using ANC. A December 2016 study from the Hong Kong Journal of Occupational Therapy found that noise-cancellation headphones helped children with autism spectrum disorder cope with behaviors related to hyper-reactivity and auditory stimuli.

== Drawbacks ==
The active noise control requires power, usually supplied by a USB port or a battery that must occasionally be replaced or recharged. Without power, some models do not function as regular headphones. Any battery and additional electronics may increase the size and weight of the headphones compared to regular headphones. The noise-cancelling circuitry may reduce audio quality and add high-frequency hiss, although reducing the noise may result in higher perceived audio quality.

== See also ==
- Active vibration control
- Noise-canceling microphone
- Passive noise-cancelling headphones
- Throat microphone
- Headphones
- Hearing protection device
- Signal processing
- Bluetooth
- Audio engineering
