= Flight helmet =

Headgear worn by pilots and flight crew

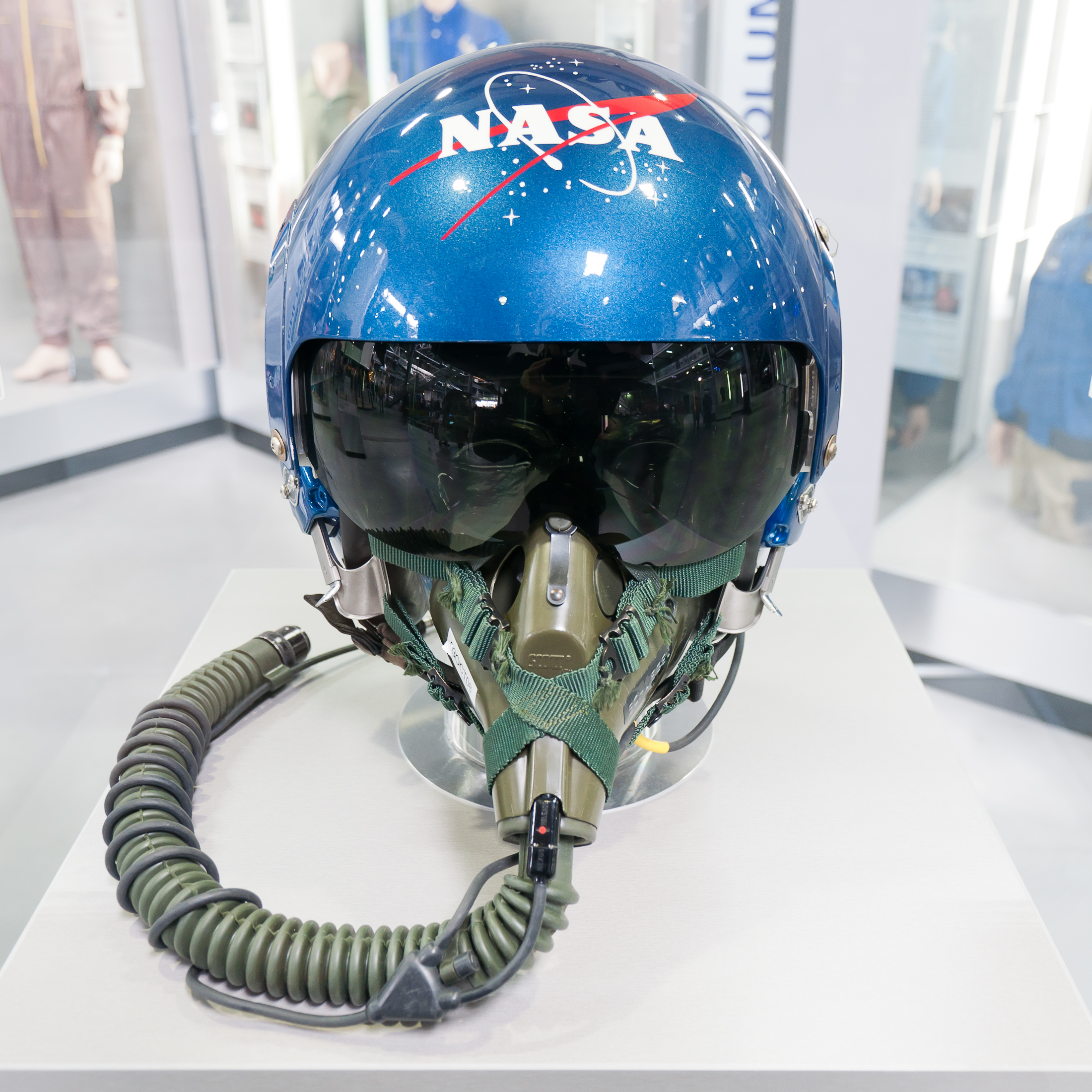
NASA HGU-26P helmet for the Northrop T-38 Talon aircraft

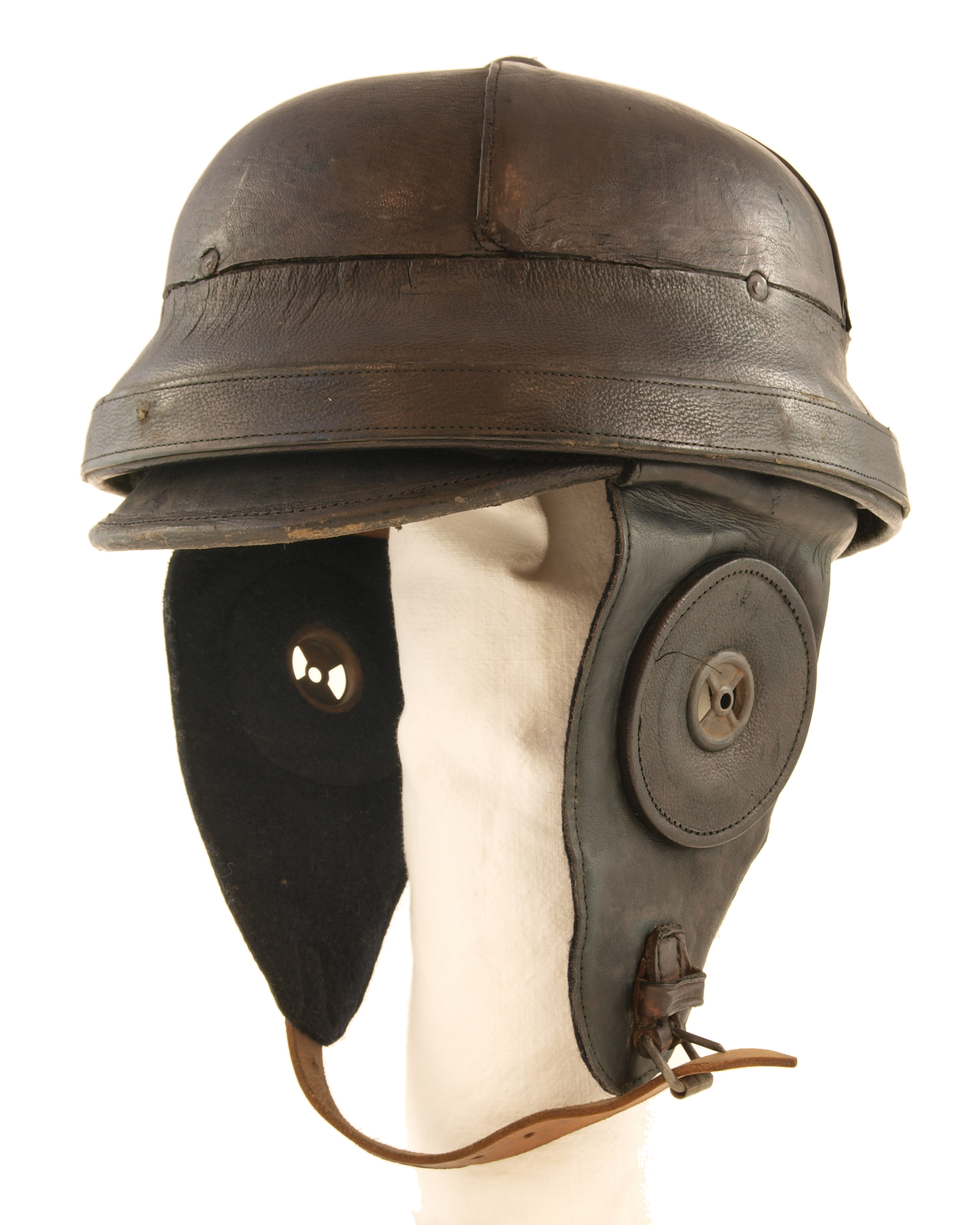
German leather flight helmet of World War I

A flight helmet, sometimes referred to as a "skull dome", "bone dome" or "foam dome", is a special type of helmet primarily worn by military aircrew.

A flight helmet can provide:

- Impact protection to reduce the risk of head injury (e.g. in the event of a parachute landing) and protection from wind blast (e.g. in the event of ejection).
- A visor to shield the eyes from sunlight, flash, supersonic wind blasts and laser beams.
- Noise attenuation, headphones and a microphone (except when included in a mask).
- A helmet mounted display, mounting for night vision goggles and/or a helmet tracking system (so the aircraft knows where the pilot is looking).

The design of a flight helmet may also consider:

- Comfort – including the weight, centre of gravity and provision for cooling and ventilation.
- Compatibility with an oxygen mask (for high-altitude flight and NBC protection).

== History of flight helmets ==
In the first days of aviation, the leather helmets used in motor-racing were adopted by pilots as head protection. During World War I, British Engineers led by Charles Edmon Prince added earphones (now called headphones) and a throat microphone to make a "hands-free" communications systems for Flight Helmets – then called "aircraft telephones". The Group's first product was a hand held "aircraft telephone" and, over a 3 year-process of experimenting with various voice microphones, found the hands-free throat microphone built inside a flight helmet much more user-friendly in open-cockpit airplanes due to excessive wind noise and vibrations.

The initial design of early leather flying helmets was adapted during the 1930s to become the iconic type B helmet which enabled the external attachment of radio earphones, oxygen masks, and removable goggles to protect pilot's eyes from the elements. A detailed description of a typical Type B helmet can be found on the website of the Imperial War Museum (London, England). It is made from six vertical panels which meet at a central ridge panel running from front to back. There is a rectangular horizontal panel which goes across the forehead and it includes padded leather oval housings at the ears. The chinstrap, also made of leather, is stitched to the right side and buckled to a small strap on the left. The brown leather of the helmet is lined with buff-colored chamois and has a rectangular length of brown-colored material sewn to the inside of the forehead.

By World War II, improved oxygen masks became common as planes flew higher where thinner air required a breathable air supply to the pilots and crew. After World War II until the Korean War, the leather headpiece was gradually replaced with a hard helmet to provide head protection during bailing out (and later with high velocity ejection). Also, goggles were replaced by a built-in visor which was tinted to protect against sun. Current headgear (appearing after the Vietnam War) usually includes communications equipment (headset and microphones) to let pilots communicate with ground operations and their crew.

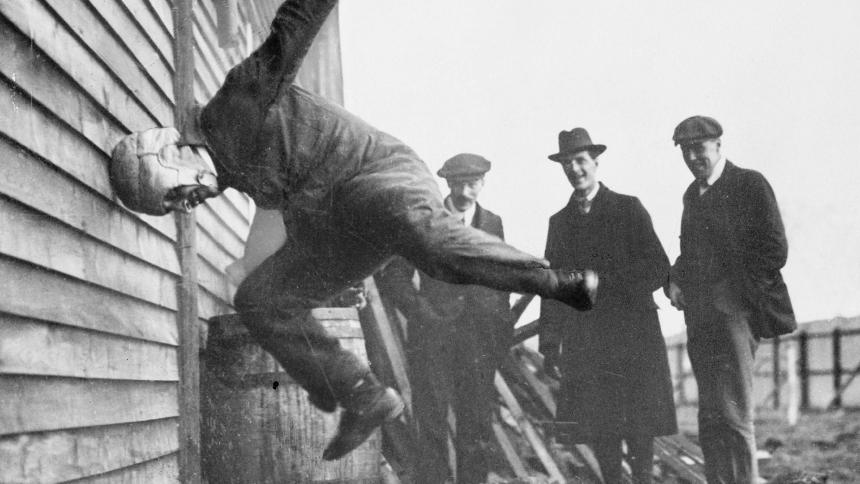
Demonstration of the Warren Safety Helmet, 1912

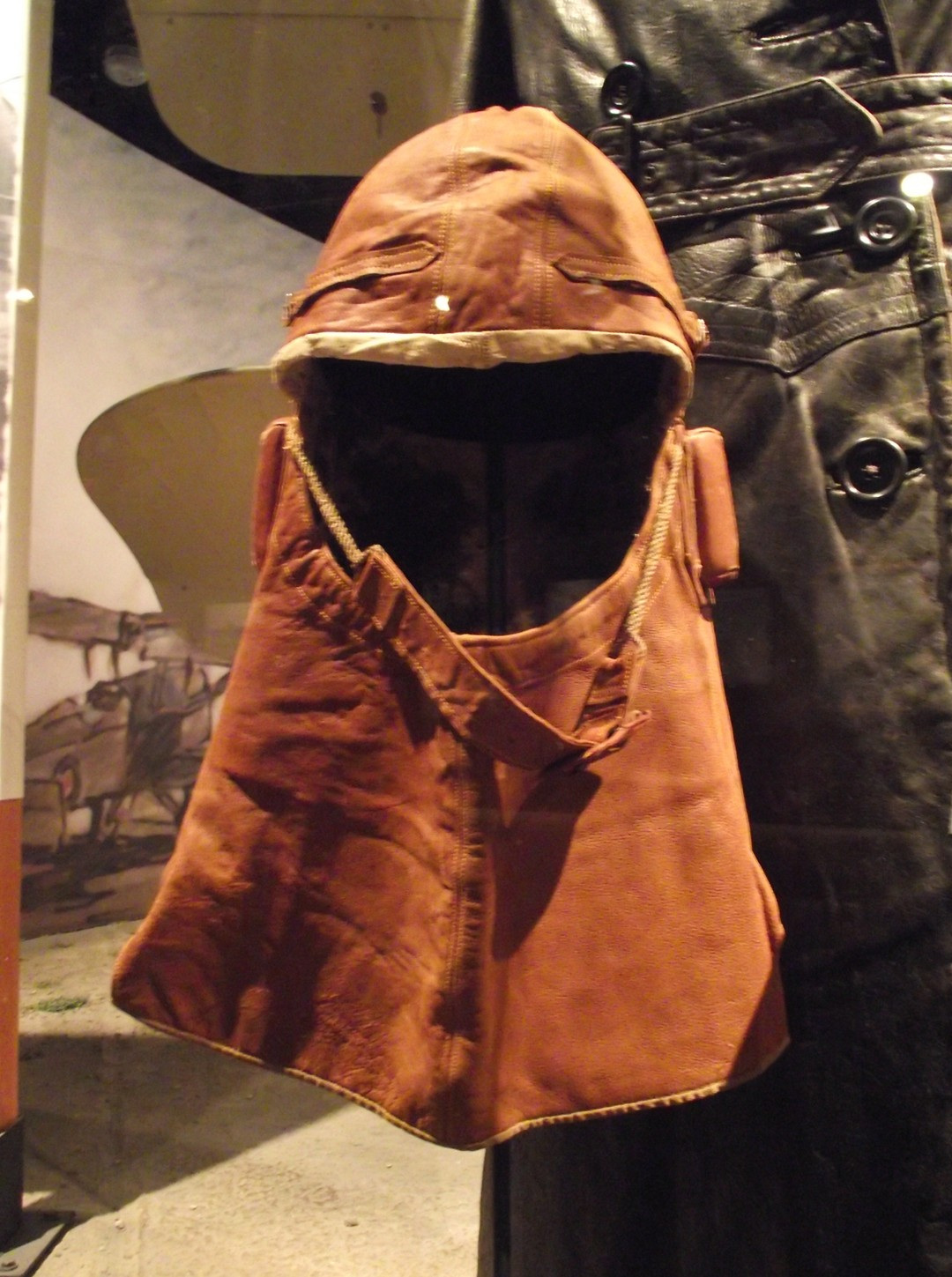
British leather flying helmet from 1918

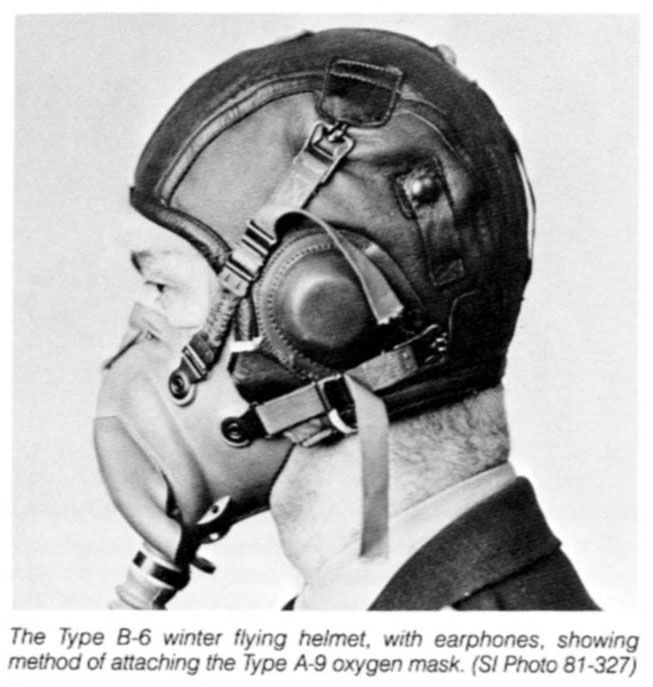
Type B-6 winter flying helmet with A-9 oxygen mask, WW2 vintage

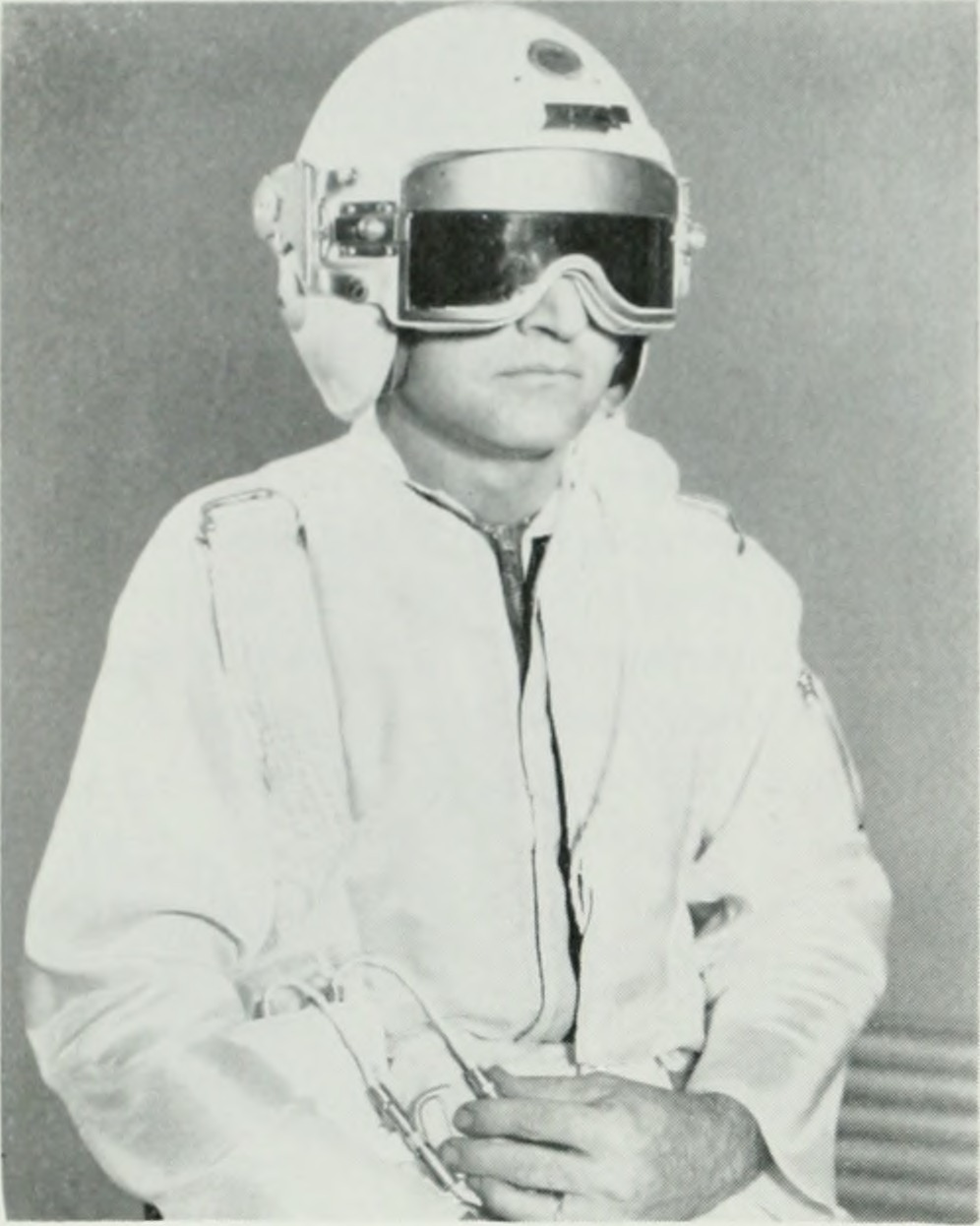
Helmet with anti-flash goggles

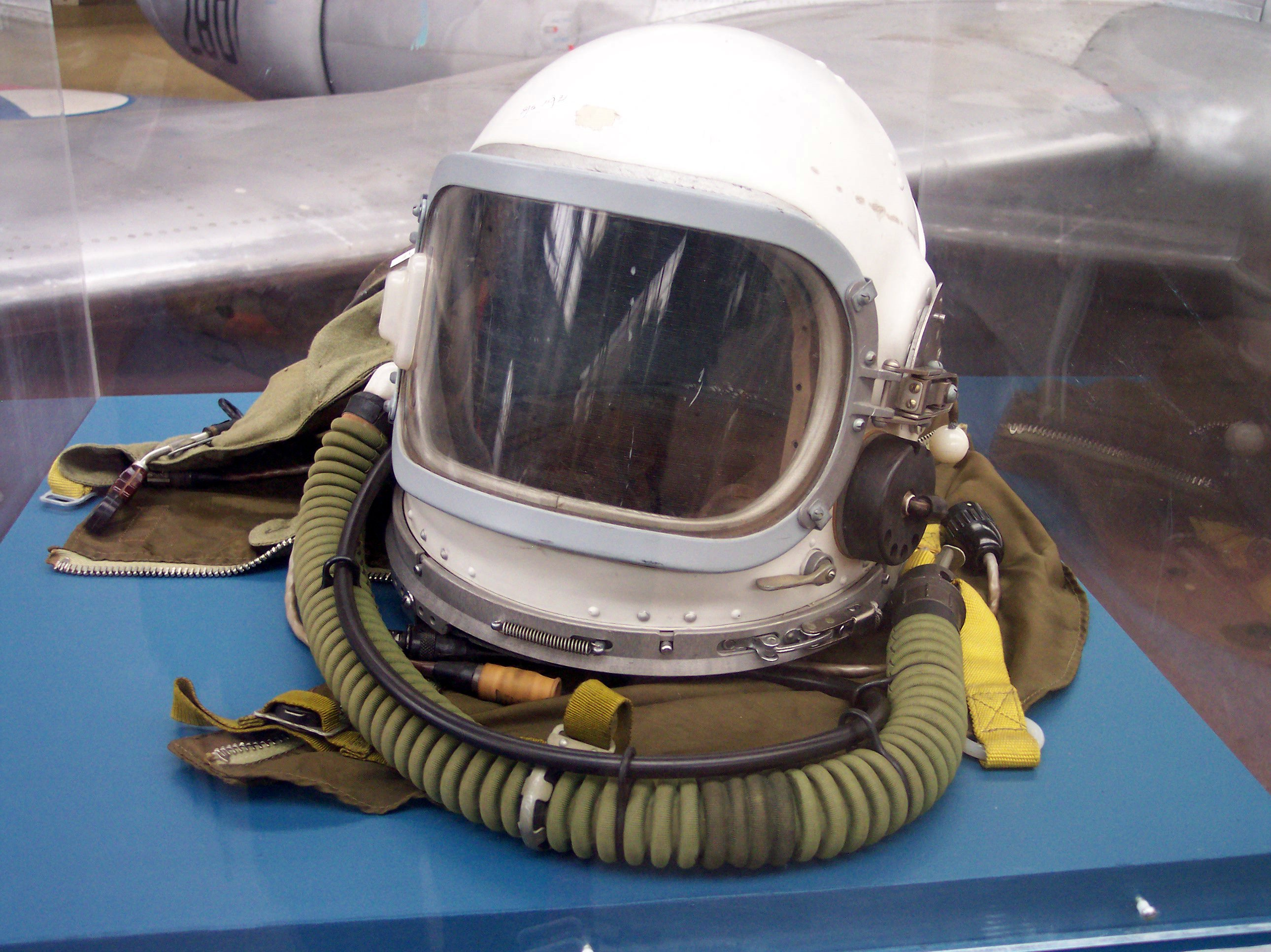
Soviet MiG-25 pilot helmet of the 1980s

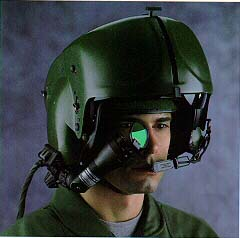
Modern US Army Apache helmet

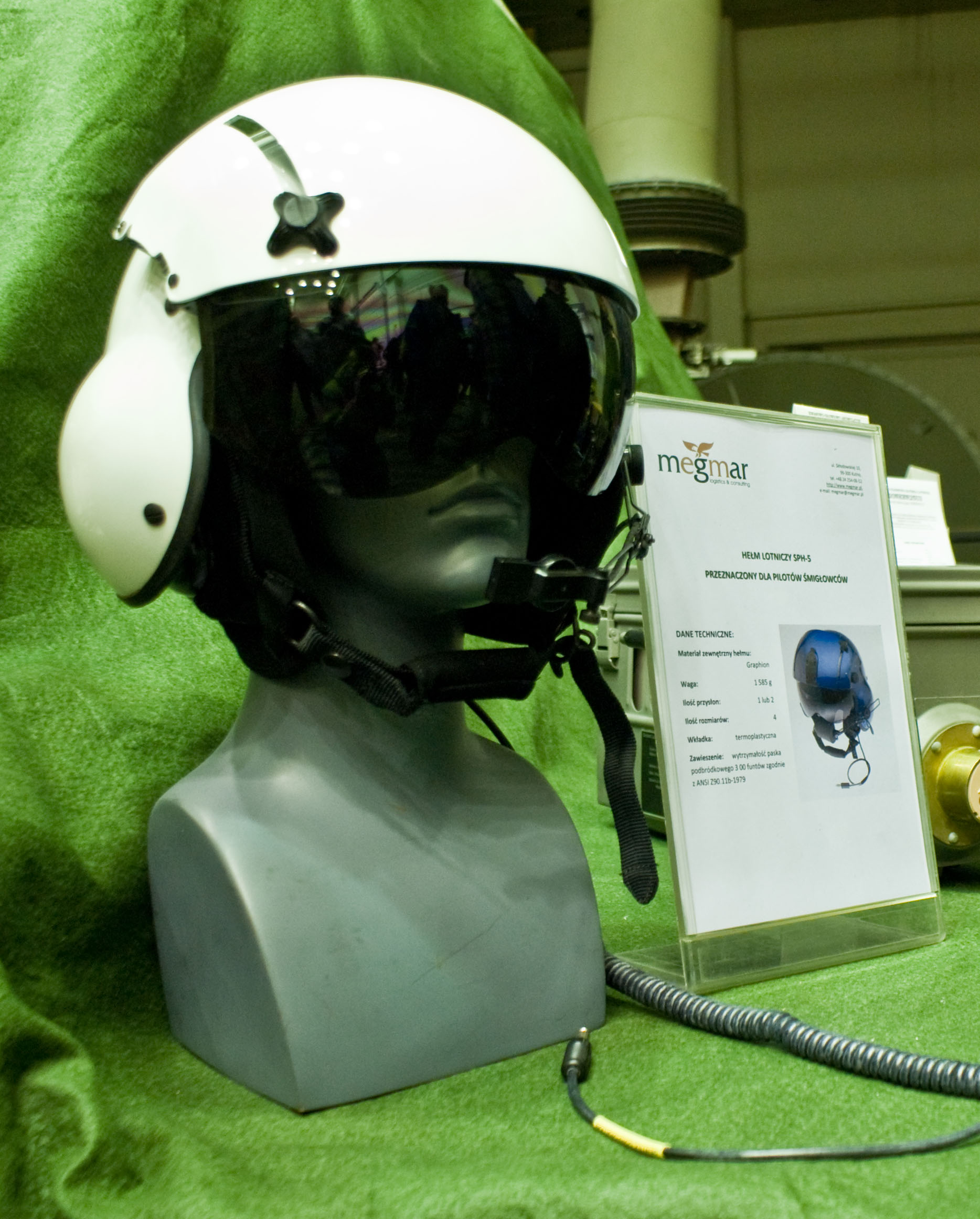
Gentex SPH-5 helicopter helmet

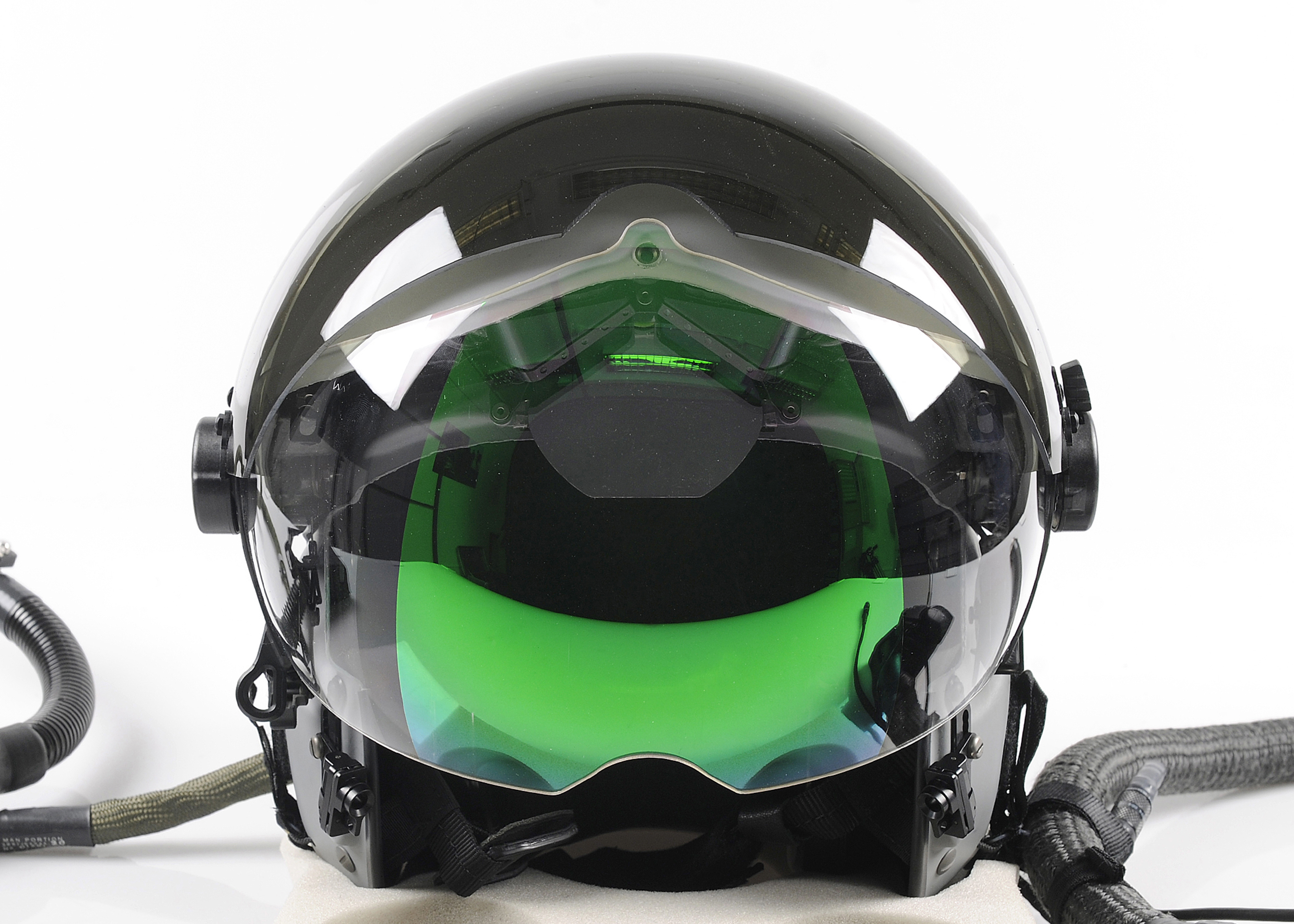
Eurofighter Typhoon helmet showing the Helmet Mounted Symbology System

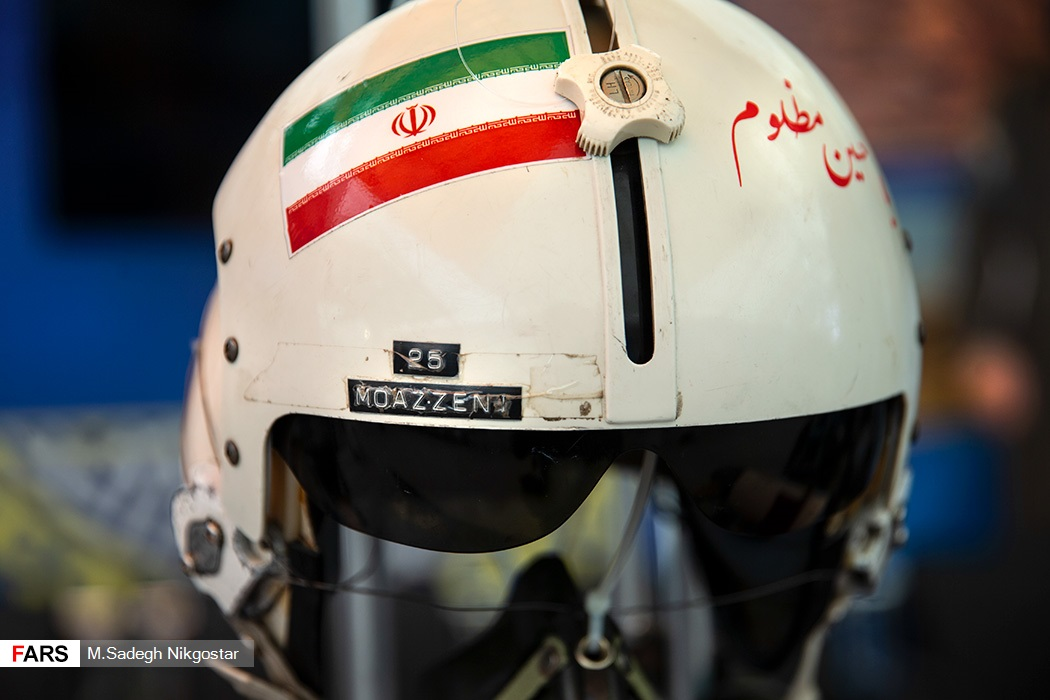
Gentex helmet used by Iran

== See also ==
- Index of aviation articles
