= Helen Kerly =

English pilot of WWII

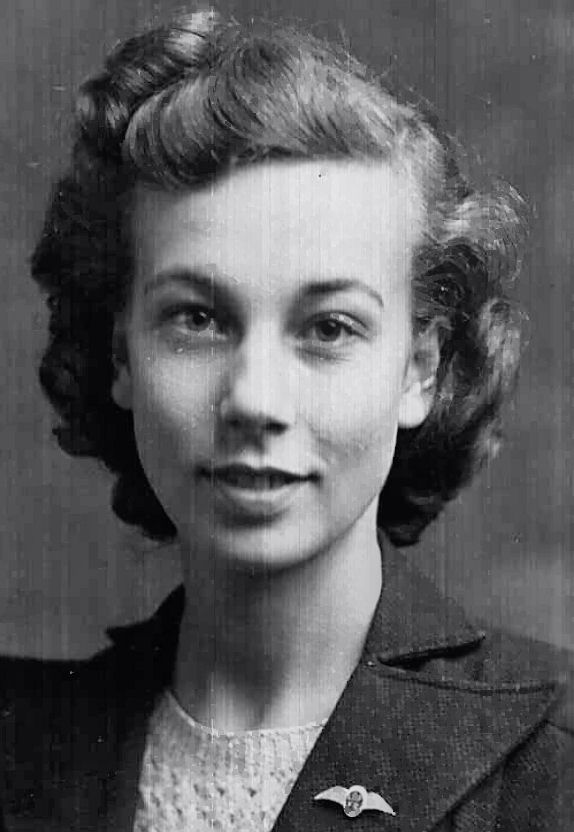
- photo from Royal Aero Club in 1938
- Born: Ruth Helen Kerly; 6 January 1916; London, England
- Died: 26 May 1992 (aged 76)
- Employer: Air Transport Auxiliary
- Known for: female commended ATA pilot
- Title: Third Officer
- Spouse: Charles William Storm Clark

Helen Kerly or Ruth Helen Clark (6 January 1916 - 26 May 1992) was a British female ATA pilot officer during the Second World War who was one of only two such women who received a commendation.

== Early life ==
Ruth Helen Kerly, known as Helen, was born on 6 January 1916 in Putney, London to Ada and Frederick Gyles Kerly (d. 1920). She earned her pilot's licence (No. 16749) on 14 December 1938 flying a D H Gypsy Moth at the London Air Park Flying Club, whilst a student.

She was working as a shorthand typist and recorded in the 1939 Register as living with her widowed mother Ada and her older sister Joyce, a teacher, in Esher, Surrey.

== Air Transport Auxiliary ==
She came to notice as a pilot who delivered aircraft in the civilian Air Transport Auxiliary including Spitfires during the Second World War, with the rank of Third Officer.

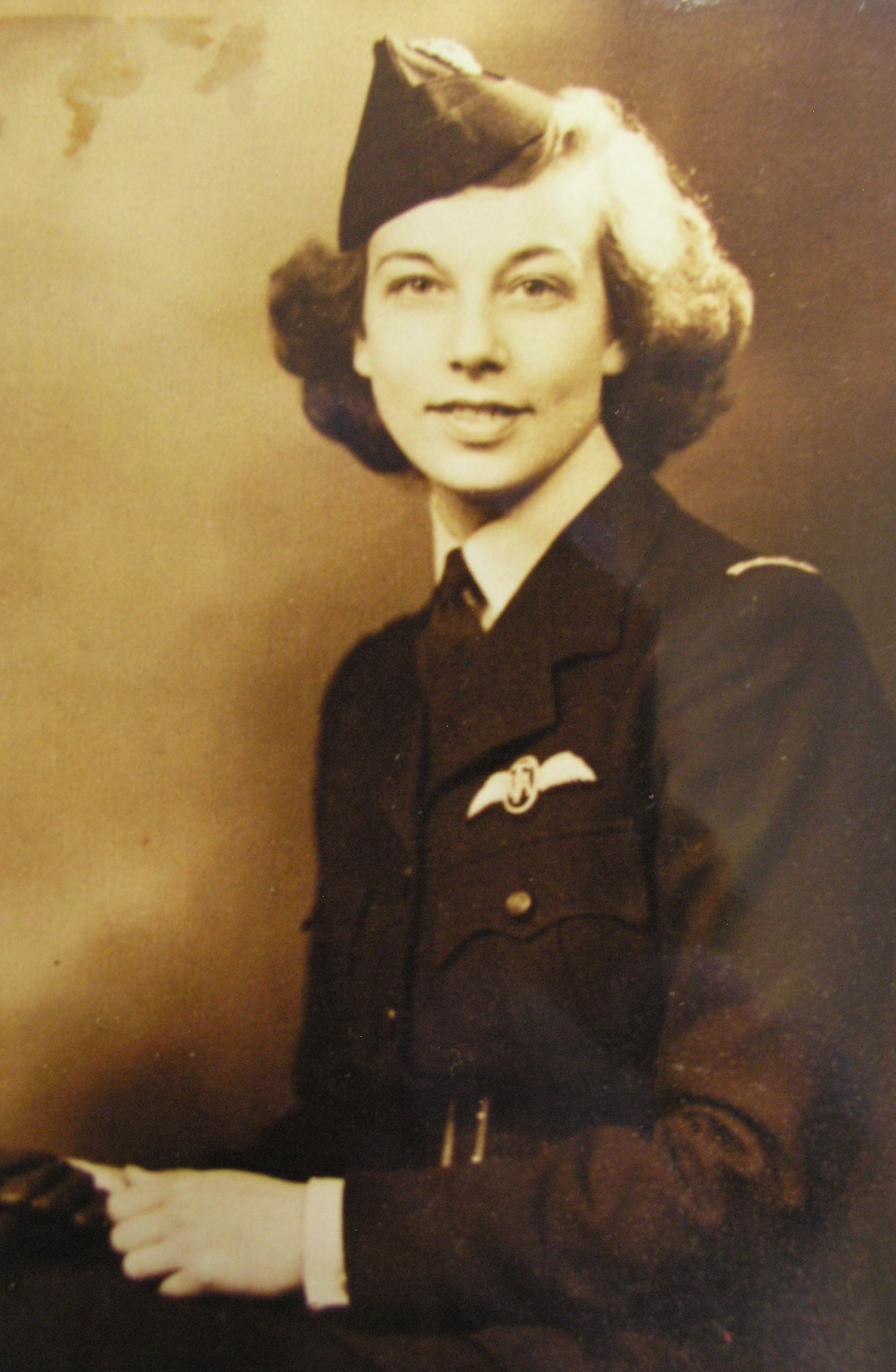
Helen Kerly in ATA uniform

Women were not permitted to fly or crew aircraft in combat, but could deliver aircraft from manufacturers to squadrons. Kerly had been a member of the Royal Aero Club in 1938. She became the 130th pilot employed by the Air Transport Auxiliary (ATA) on 23 August 1943. Her job was to deliver aircraft from various factories, including the major Castle Bromwich Aircraft Factory, to airfields around Britain.

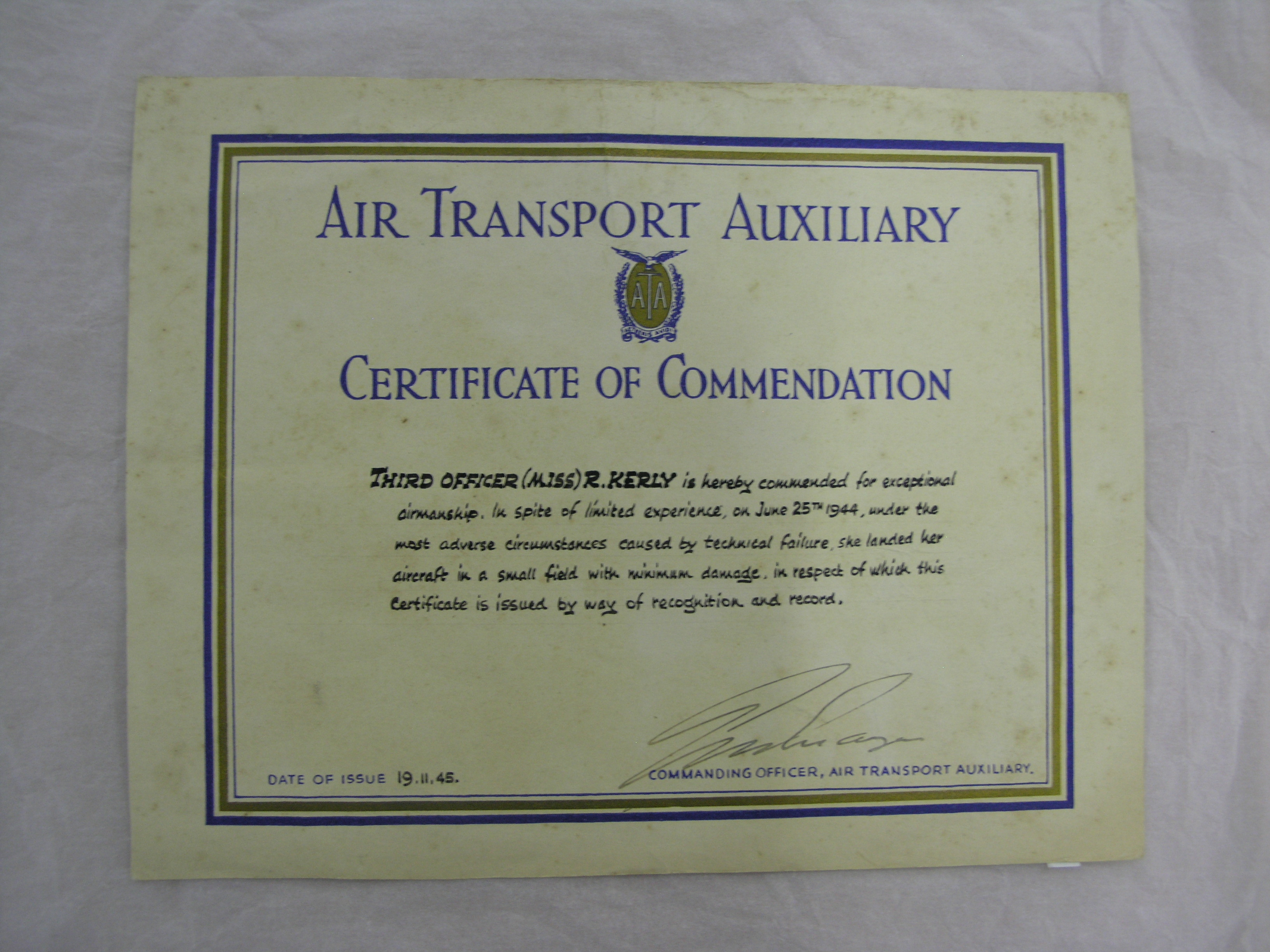
Kerly's certificate of commendation

Kerly was one of only two women to be commended as pilots during the war, for landing a Mustang that had technical difficulties in a small field on 25 June 1944. She had one other forced landing, on 4 May 1945, in Spitfire XIV TZ104, after a serious oil leak, landing on an unserviceable part of the airfield with only trivial damage as another aircraft was landing on the runway.

After leaving the ATA on 30 September 1945 she married Charles William Storm Clark in 1947.

== Legacy ==
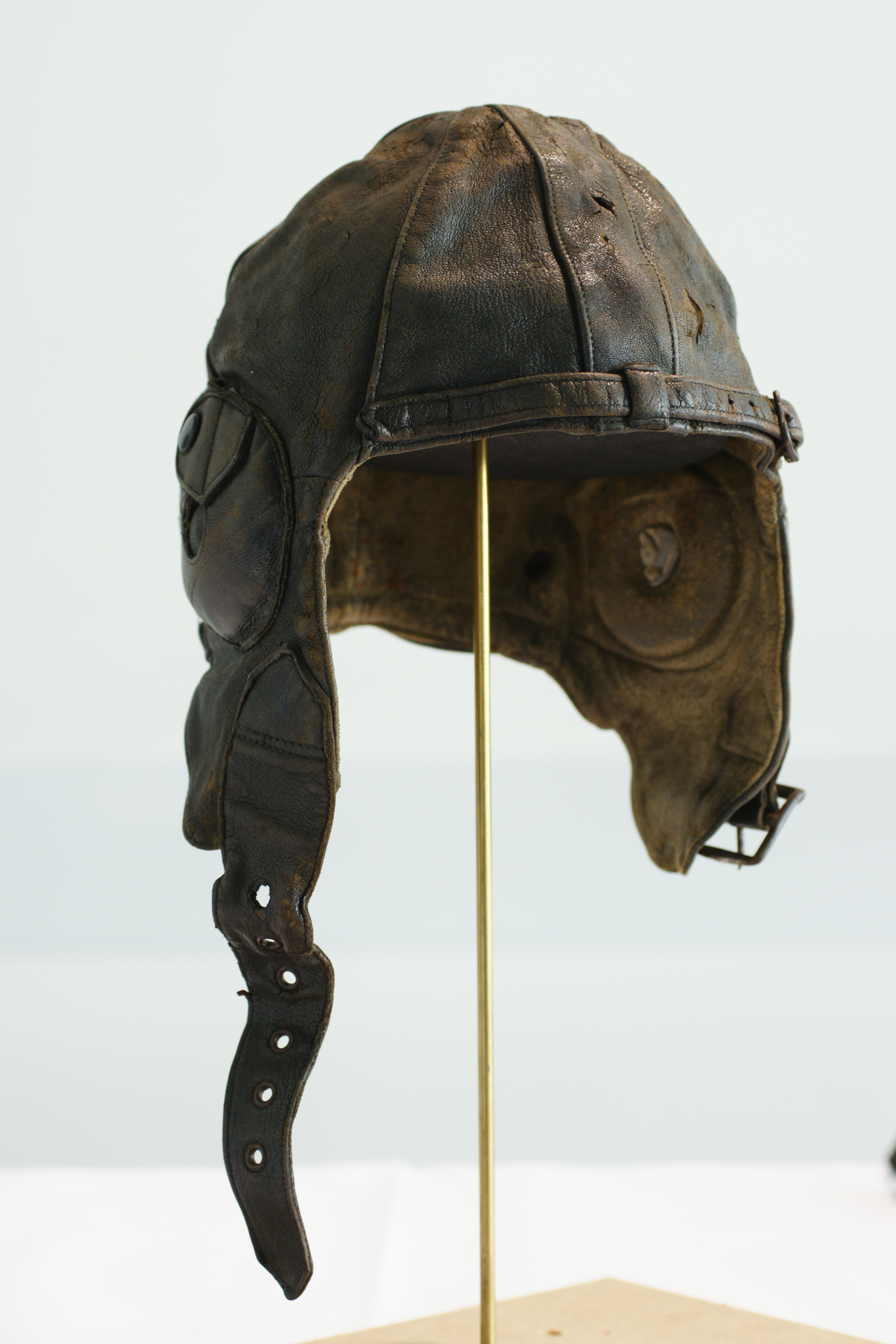
Kerly's leather flying helmet

When she died on 26 May 1992 she left her leather flying helmet and goggles to a fellow pilot, Alec Matthews, who donated their joint memorabilia to Thinktank, Birmingham Science Museum. The helmet and goggles went on display in the Spitfire Gallery, which opened in 2015.
