= Leather flying helmet =

Pilot's headgear

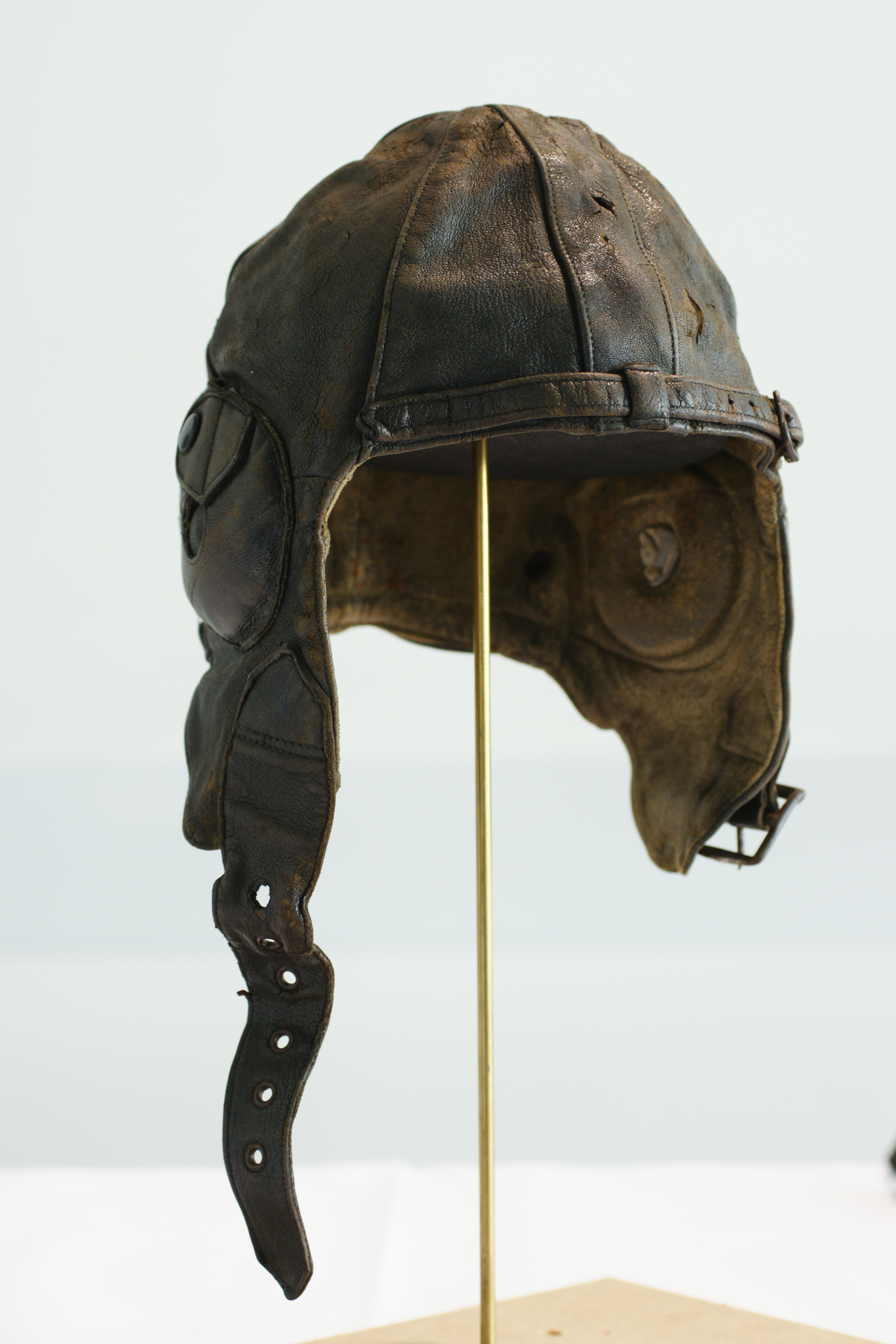
Helen Kerly's helmet from the Second World War

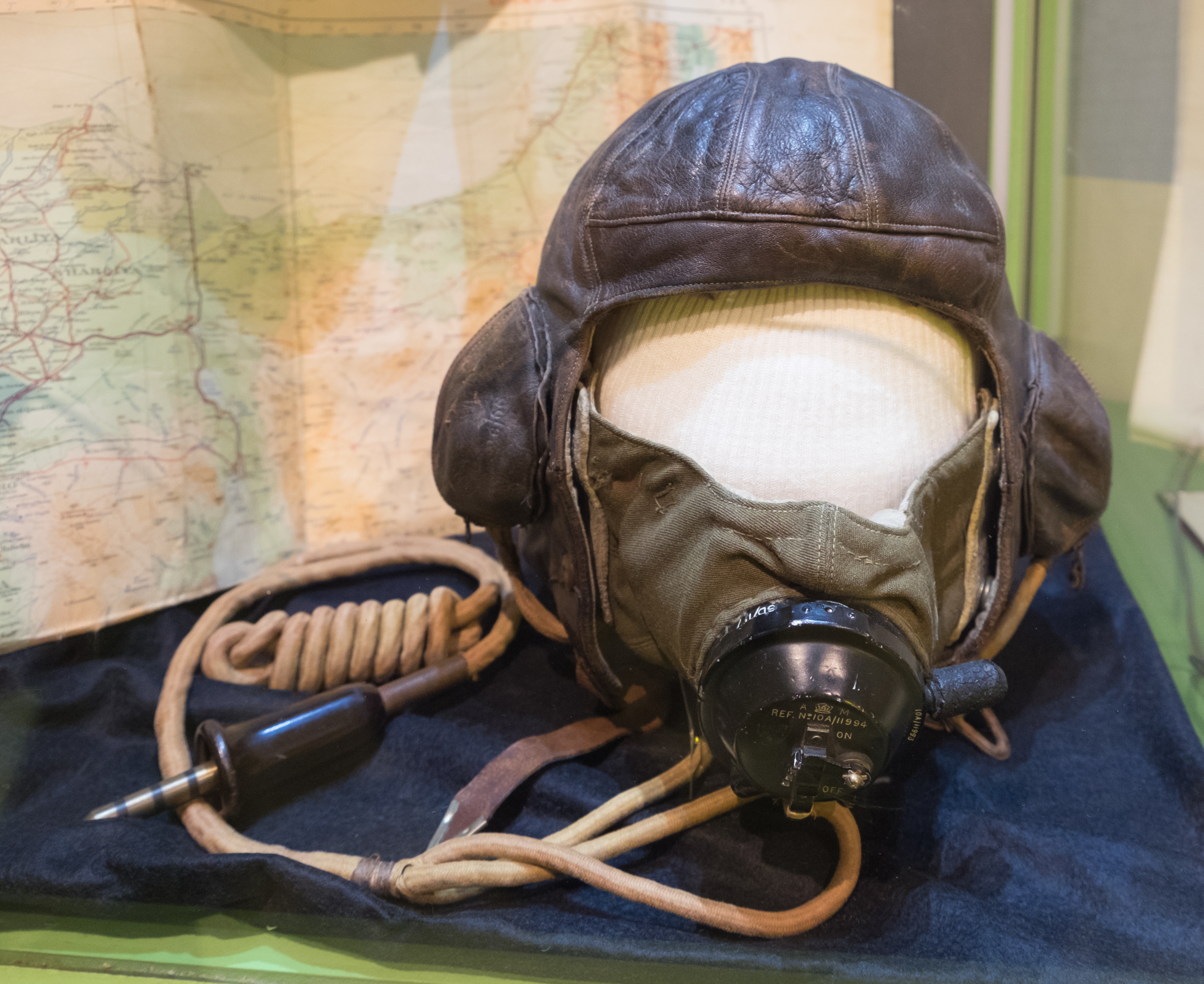
Roald Dahl's RAF flying helmet from the Second World War, fitted with oxygen mask and communications equipment

A leather flying helmet, also known as an aviator hat, bomber hat or soft flight helmet, is a cap with large earflaps, a chin strap, and a short bill that is commonly turned up at the front to show the lining (often fleece or fur). As protective gear that was developed at the start of the 20th century it was worn by pilots during the world wars. It may be made of other materials, such as felt.

With the rise of motorsport and aviation at the start of the 1900s, leather became a popular choice for protective gear from the cold and the engine noise. It had many advantages that made it ideal for flying helmets being warm, durable, impermeable to liquids, flexible, and able to be cut to curve around the head. It is also wind proof and had the advantage of not accumulating dust. Leather helmets also offered some protection to pilots against fire.

Manufacturers of early flying helmets were Alfred Dunhill Ltd. and Gamages of London, England, and Roold in Paris.

Female pilots in the early part of the 1900s were issued with the same design of protective clothing, including helmets, as their male counterparts.

British engineers led by Charles Edmond Prince added throat microphones and earphones into these helmets during the First World War for hands-free communications in the noisy and windy environment of aircraft cockpits.

With the advent of closed-cockpit airplanes, head protection became less necessary (Charles Lindbergh still wore a leather helmet when he crossed the Atlantic in 1927, though his Spirit of St. Louis monoplane had a closed cockpit).

In air forces, leather helmets were continuously used and developed. A well-known early leather flying helmet was the British Type B helmet, designed to accommodate earphones in pockets in the ear-flaps and easy to wear with oxygen masks and goggles. The Imperial War Museum has several examples used in both World Wars, with detailed descriptions. See illustration above of a Type B flying helmet that belonged to Spitfire delivery pilot Helen Kerly, now in the Thinktank, Birmingham Science Museum.

With the advent of jet fighters after the Second World War, solid plastic and, later, carbon fibre flight helmets replaced leather helmets in the cockpits of aircraft. Aviator's hats continue in popularity as a fashion accessory and winter headwear.

== Gallery ==
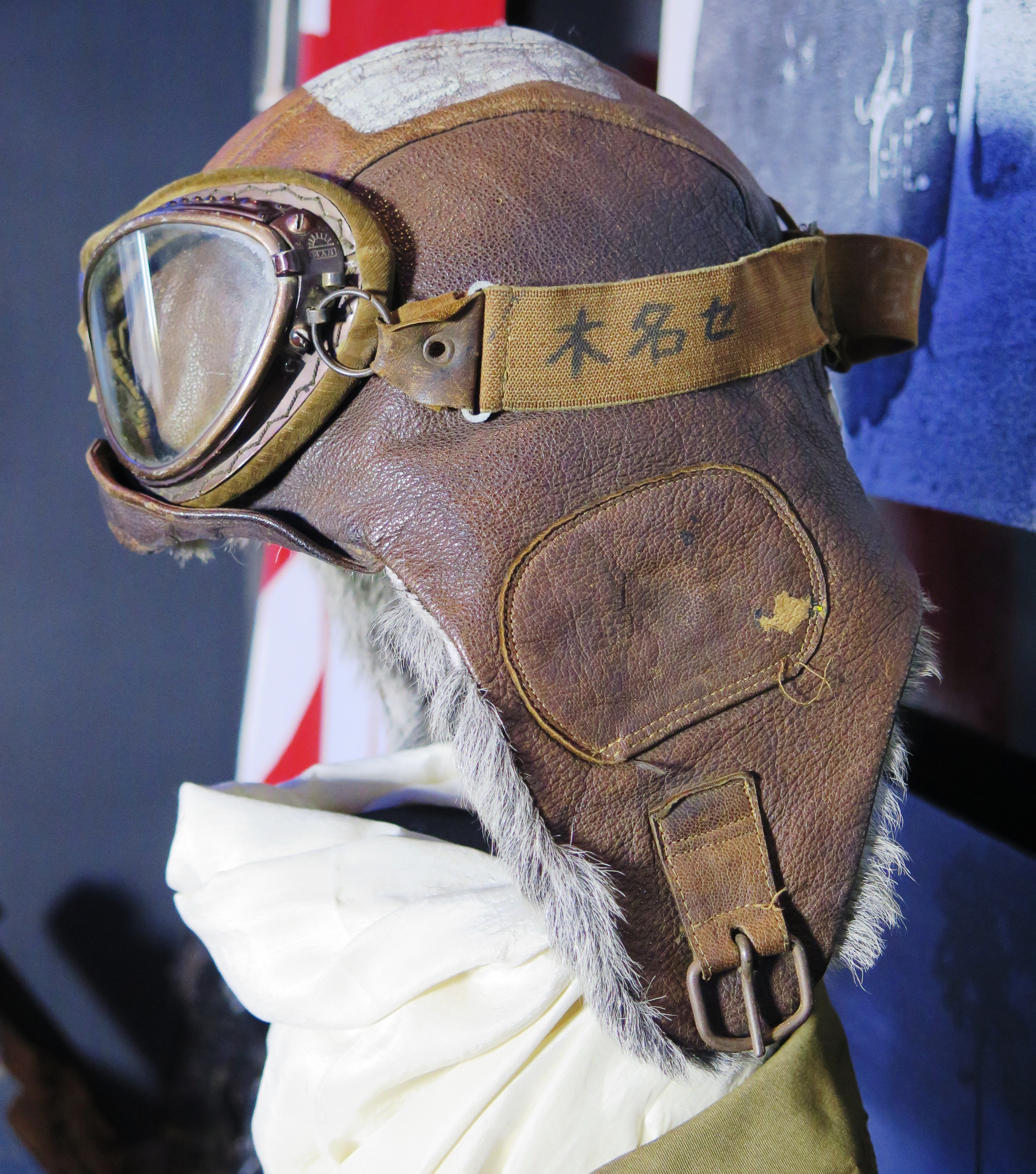

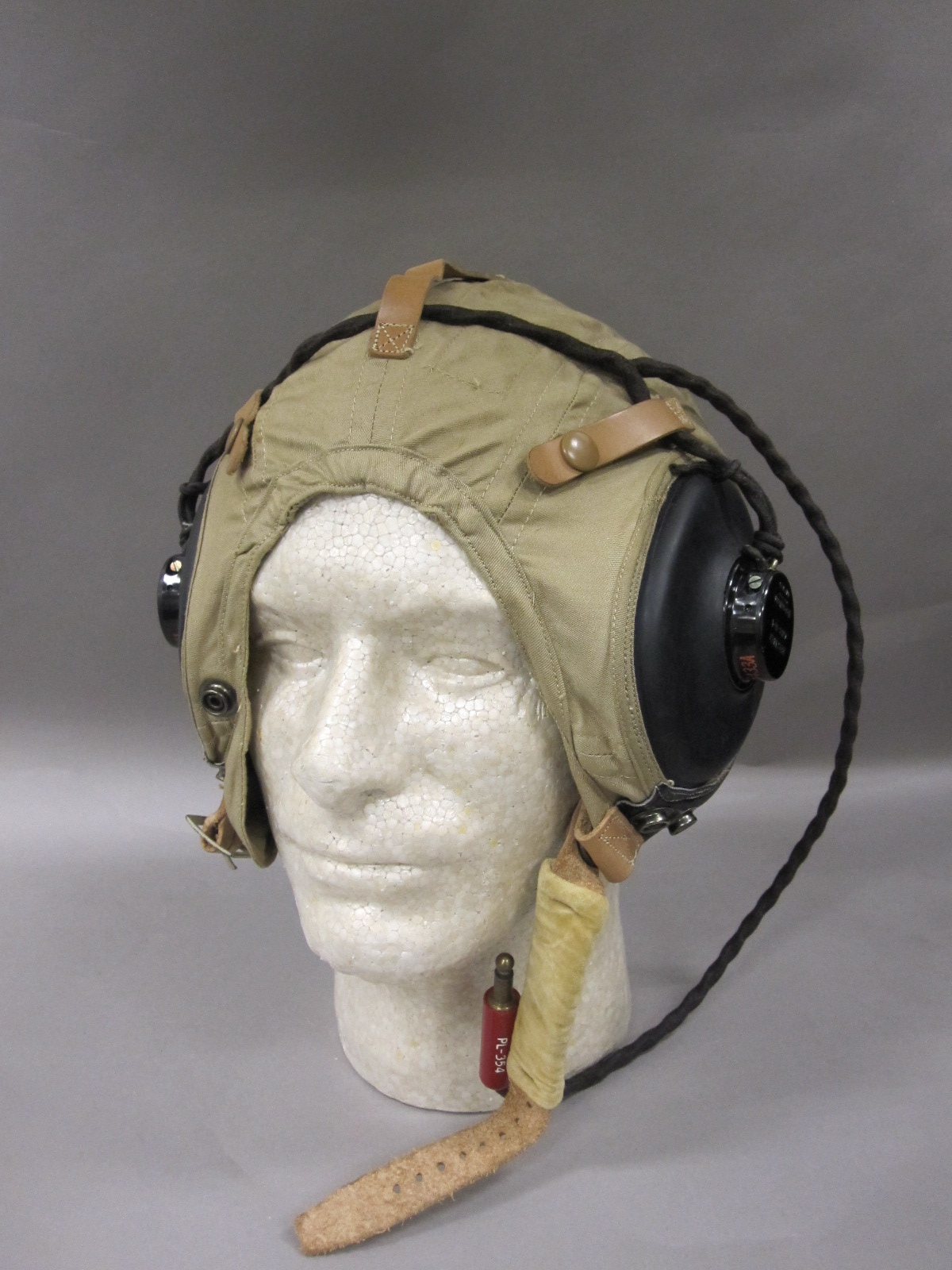

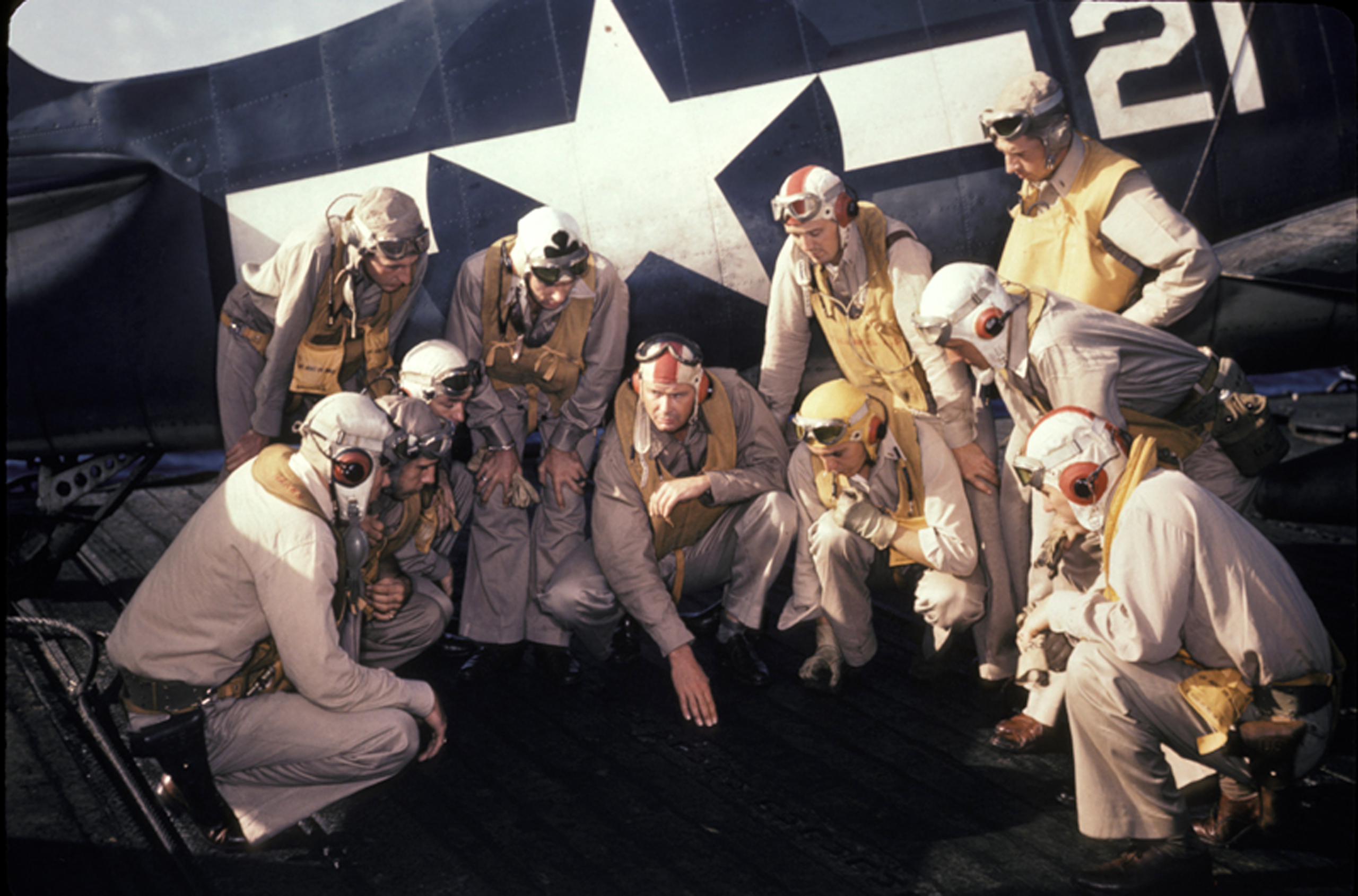

== See also ==
- Index of aviation articles
- List of hat styles
- List of headgear
- Legionnaire hat
