= Tinnie =

Colloquial term

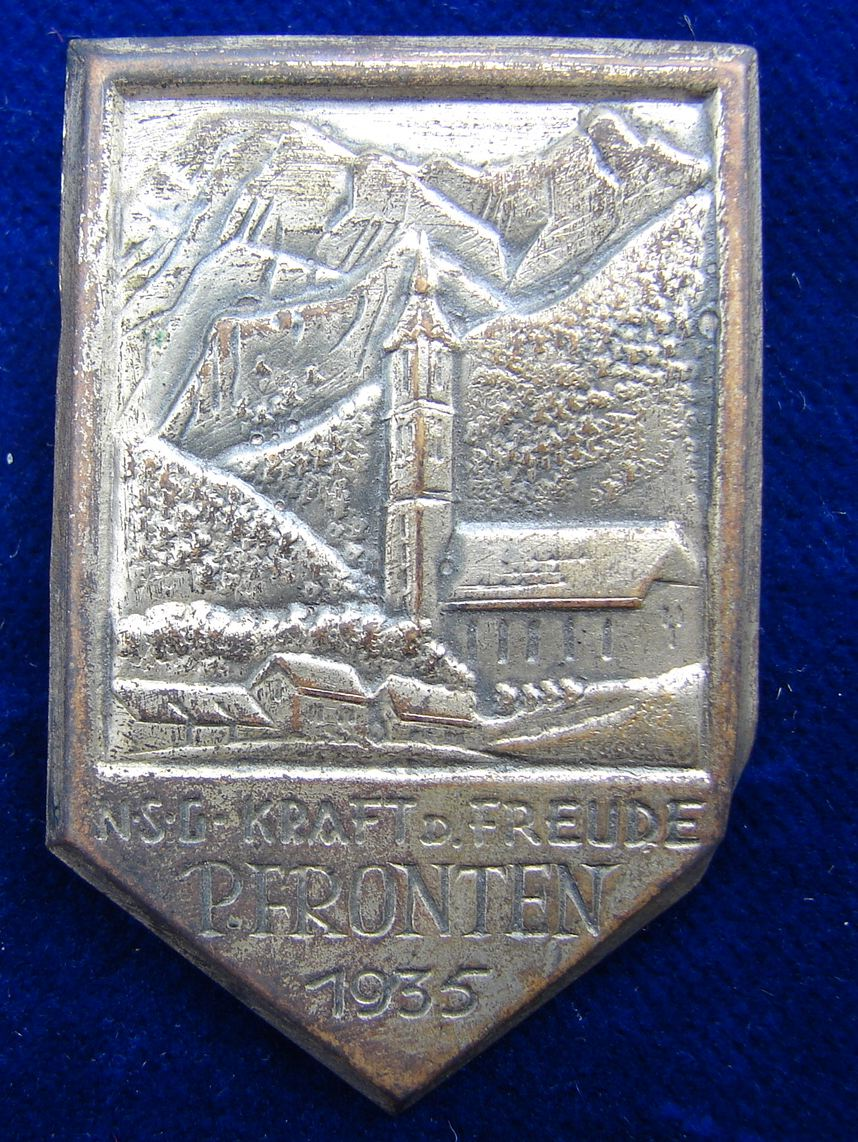
"Tinnie" issued by the Nazi Party in 1935

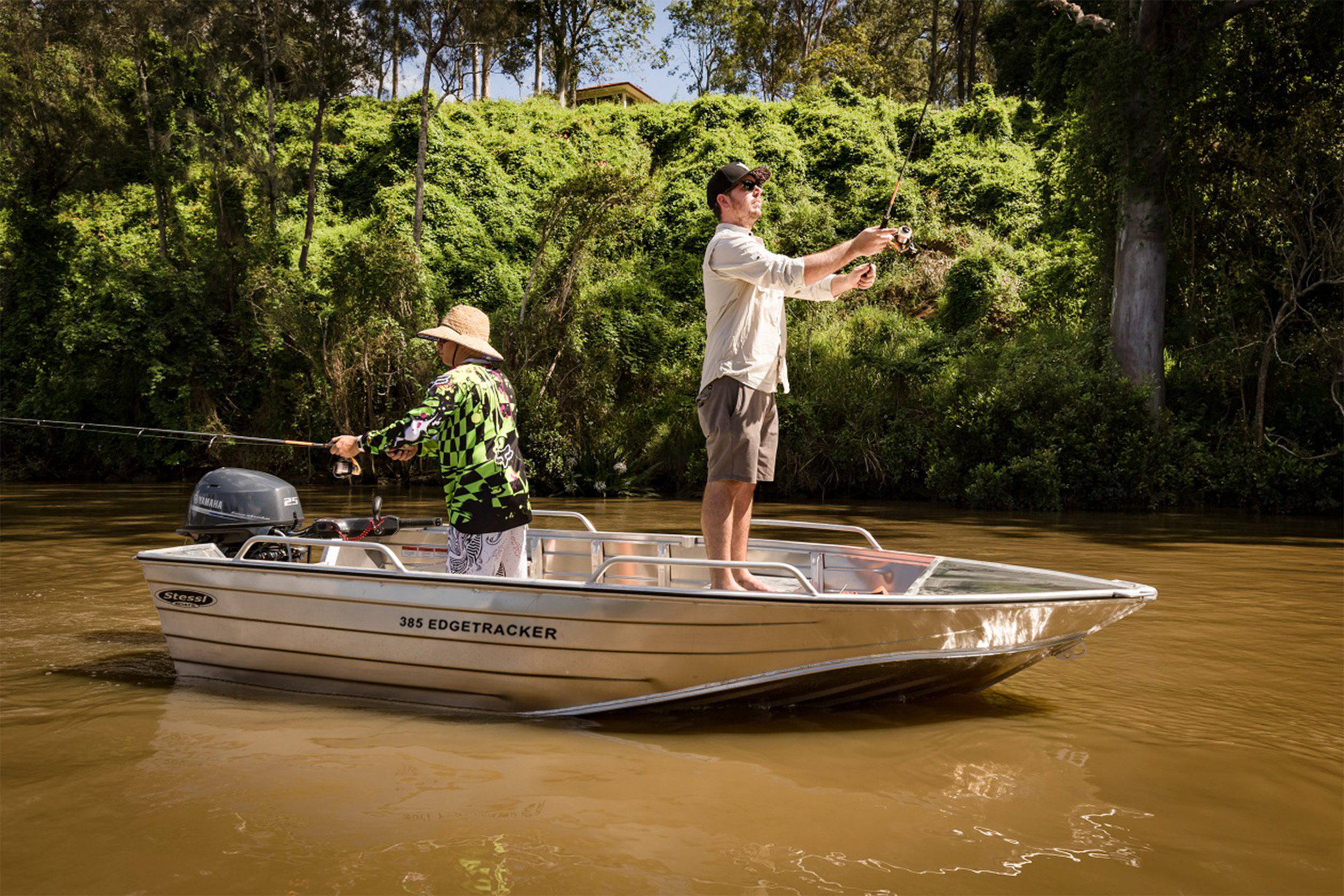
A tinny in the Australian usage of the term

The slang or colloquial term tinnie or tinny has a variety of meanings, generally derived from some association with the metal tin, or aluminium foil which has a loose allusion to tin.

"Tinnie" is the common term for a commemorative medal made from a non-precious metal such as zinc or tin (or even plastic) and with provisions for being attached to a garment and displayed while worn. Such medals were commonly sold or given away at public events to build group cohesiveness or to lend prestige to the wearer. The "golden age of the tinnie" was World War II, and the Nazi Party and the USSR were among the most prolific disbursers of them. They are avidly collected today by hobbyists and, although usually inexpensive to obtain, are often collected in conjunction with coins, exonumia, military awards and decorations and other related small stamped or cast metal objects.

In New Zealand, a "tinny" or "tinnie" can be a small package of cannabis wrapped in tin foil (cf. 'foilies' in Australia), retailing for between NZ$20–25 (depending on the region). A building where such retailing takes place (commonly a superficially unremarkable home) is a "tinnie house". Other drugs such as methamphetamine may be available as well. In recent years the term has become not unusual in New Zealand court judgments involving the Misuse of Drugs Act.

Another variant of "tinny"/"tinnie" is as a slang term for a can of beer, commonly used in Australia. The word is also widely understood throughout the UK, where it has been used extensively to advertise Australian and Australia-themed lagers over many years. Although most "tinnies" in Australasia (and across the world) are actually now made of aluminium, the older term is still used generically across the region to refer to all cans of beer; not just those made of tin.

In Australia and New Zealand "tinny" or "tinnie" is also commonly used as slang for a small open aluminium boat.

Short for tin-arse, "tinny" is also used in Australia and New Zealand to mean "lucky", when an individual should have met with bad circumstances but has avoided them through sheer luck. A common phrase would be "he's a tinny bastard".

Tingoora, a small town just north of Kingaroy in south-east Queensland, Australia, is also often referred to as "Tinny", e.g. the "Tinny Pub".

In the United States, a "tinnie" refers to a piece of tin foil that is made into a smoking device, most often for cannabis. It is used when nothing else of use can be found.

Other uses cover certain German medals or shops selling aluminium products.

== Other meanings ==
One of the medieval Peel towers on the Scottish Borders was at Tinnies.

Colloquially meaning a game in which a group of people jump on top of each other to form a pile, like sardines in a tin. The game is initiated by an individual shouting "Tinnies", then lying face down to allow other players to lie on top, forming the pile. This game is also known by the names "Bundle" or "Pile-on."

"Tinny" is also a term for audio which lacks resonance, resembling a piece of tin being struck.

The phrase is also referenced in the Monty Python sketch "Woody and Tinny Words" where Graham Chapman describes various seemingly-random words as being "tinny" or "woody" with the former utterance inducing great discomfort in his daughter.

In the Scots dialect of the town of Bathgate, West Lothian, "Tinnie" often refers to an aluminium can of Tennent's Lager. "Here Oj, gies a tinnie o'er mate".
