= Noise-canceling microphone =

Microphone that filters ambient noise

A noise-canceling microphone is a microphone that is designed to filter ambient noise.

== Technical details ==
The development is a special case of the differential microphone topology most commonly used to achieve directionality. All such microphones have at least two ports through which sound enters; a front port normally oriented toward the desired sound and another port that's more distant. The microphone's diaphragm is placed between the two ports; sound arriving from an ambient sound field reaches both ports more or less equally. Sound that's much closer to the front port than to the rear will make more of a pressure gradient between the front and back of the diaphragm, causing it to move more. The microphone's proximity effect is adjusted so that flat frequency response is achieved for sound sources very close to the front of the mic – typically 1 to 3 cm. Sounds arriving from other angles are subject to steep midrange and bass rolloff. Commercially and militarily useful noise-canceling microphones have been made since at least 1935 (Amelia Earhart used one on her 1935 flight from Hawaii to California) and have been made since the 1940s by Roanwell, Electro-Voice and others.

== Alternative technologies ==
Another technique uses two or more microphones and active or passive circuitry to reduce the noise. The primary microphone is closer to the desired source (like a person's mouth). A second mic receives ambient noise. In a noisy environment, both microphones receive noise at a similar level, but the primary mic receives the desired sounds more strongly. Thus if one signal is subtracted from the other (in the simplest sense, by connecting the microphones out of phase) much of the noise is canceled while the desired sound is retained. Other techniques may be used as well, such as using a directional primary mic, to maximize the difference between the two signals and make the cancellation easier to do.

The internal electronic circuitry of an active noise-canceling mic attempts to subtract noise signal from the primary microphone. The circuit may employ passive or active noise canceling techniques to filter out the noise, producing an output signal that has a lower noise floor and a higher signal-to-noise ratio.

== Applications ==
- Call center headsets
- Helicopter pilot headsets
- Race car driver headsets
- Shipboard communications
- Video Gaming Headsets

== See also ==
- Noise-cancelling headphones
- Acoustic quieting
- Active noise control
