= Uno (bus company) =

Bus company owned by the University of Hertfordshire

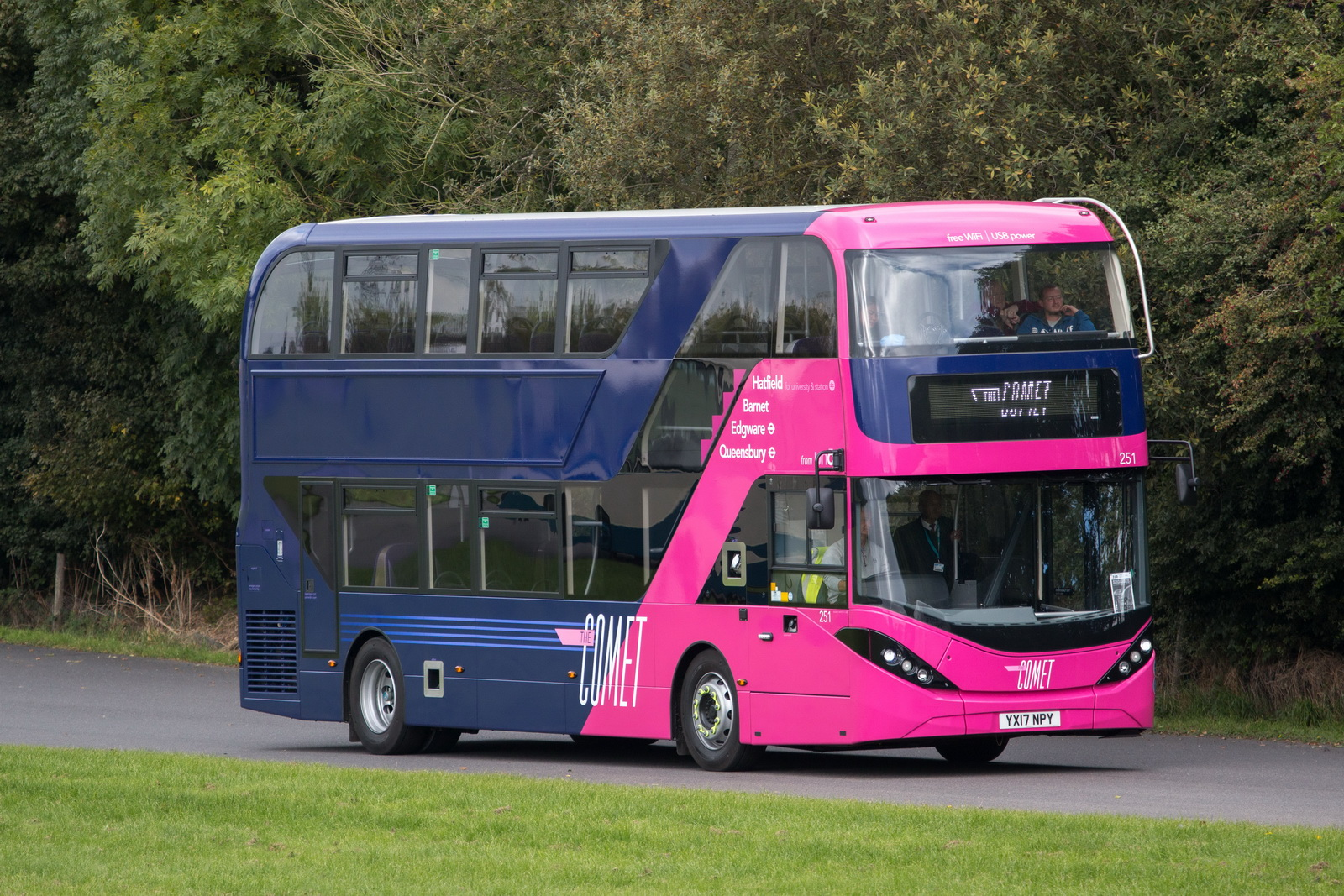
- An Uno Alexander Dennis Enviro400 City branded for The Comet at Showbus 2017
- Parent: University of Hertfordshire
- Founded: 1992
- Headquarters: Hatfield Business Park
- Service area: Greater London; Hertfordshire; Buckinghamshire; Bedfordshire
- Service type: Bus services
- Routes: 24
- Hubs: Hatfield; St Albans; Cranfield; Milton Keynes; Bedford
- Fleet: 94 (March 2024)
- Website: unobus.info

Universitybus Limited, trading as Uno, is a bus operator owned and operated by the University of Hertfordshire, serving members of the general public, and also its own students and staff. The service was set up in 1992, growing out of a shuttle service previously operated for students at Wall Hall College located near Watford connecting them to the other campuses of the university and the Polytechnic (Hatfield) before that.

It provides student transport to the university from local areas as well as improving east–west travel across Hertfordshire and has opened up new links from North London. Services have expanded as the university has closed outlying sites at Watford and Hertford and developed the new de Havilland Campus on the site of the former Hatfield Aerodrome, Hatfield. Other developments on this site, including business premises for companies such as Veolia, DHL and EE have also provided passengers. Uno also operate urban bus networks in St Albans and formerly operated in Northampton, a network of routes between Milton Keynes and Bedford for Cranfield University, as well as contracted bus services for Transport for London.

== History ==
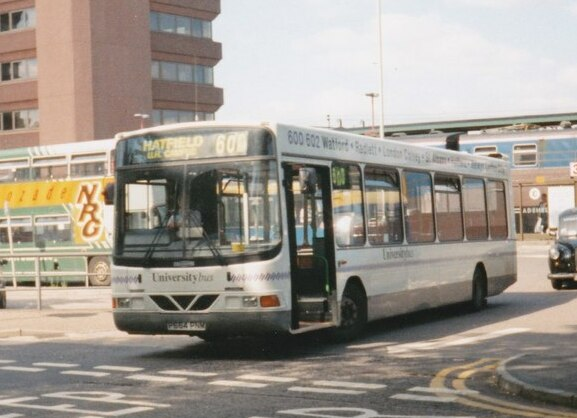
Universitybus Wright Crusader-bodied Dennis Dart at Watford Junction bus station in June 1997

A bus operator named Universitybus was set up as an 'arm's length' company by the University of Hertfordshire in 1992. It has its own board of directors and is expected to run on a fully commercial basis.

Independent research later indicated that, as a consequence of subsequent expansion into running local bus service in Hertfordshire while still maintaining its core university services, the Universitybus brand was confusing a third of the county's bus users, who did not realise they could travel on the operator's bus services. As a result, in March 2005, Universitybus was rebranded as Uno, with the operator's fleet adopting a pink and purple livery designed by Best Impressions.

Shortly after purchasing the St Albans operations of Centrebus in 2008, Uno helped to found a voluntary partnership of local authorities, the university and the bus and rail operators serving the city with the aim of co-ordinating and improving public transport across St Albans. The partnership uses powers under the most recent Transport Act as a Quality Network Partnership but is known publicly as 'Network St Albans'. Uno is currently the second largest bus operator in Hertfordshire.

On 20 April 2009, Uno recast many of its services to integrate a number of the former Centrebus routes. Further changes took place on 28 September 2009, following the opening of the new University of Hertfordshire Forum. These changes included improvements to late evening services and the extension of operating hours until as late as 3:30am for a select few routes. The main timetable change each year takes place in September to coincide with the start of the school, college and university academic year.

In September 2012, Uno commenced operating in Northampton, initially taking over routes 18 and 19, both of which serve The University of Northampton. A third service, route 21, began operating in 2013, covering some of Northampton's eastern district and serving Northampton College.

In September 2013, Uno began operating a small network of routes between Milton Keynes, Bedford and Flitwick for Cranfield University. On 25 July 2015, Uno became a contracted Transport for London (TfL) operator when it commenced operating route 383.

In November 2016, Uno's Northampton operations were shortlisted for the Top Independent Operator award in the national UK Bus Awards; they finished as a finalist.

In November 2018, Uno were shortlisted for several awards in the UK Bus Awards and won two - Marketing Initiative of the Year for The Comet routes 614 and 644 and Leadership & Inspiration for the MD, Jim Thorpe.

It was announced in November 2023 that Uno's University of Northampton operations would cease on 9 March 2024, with a new bus contract awarded by the university to Stagecoach Midlands set to commence later on the date. Stagecoach plans to integrate the contracted university bus network into Northampton's main bus network, as opposed to Uno's network remaining separate of the town and outlying areas.

=== Previous route changes ===
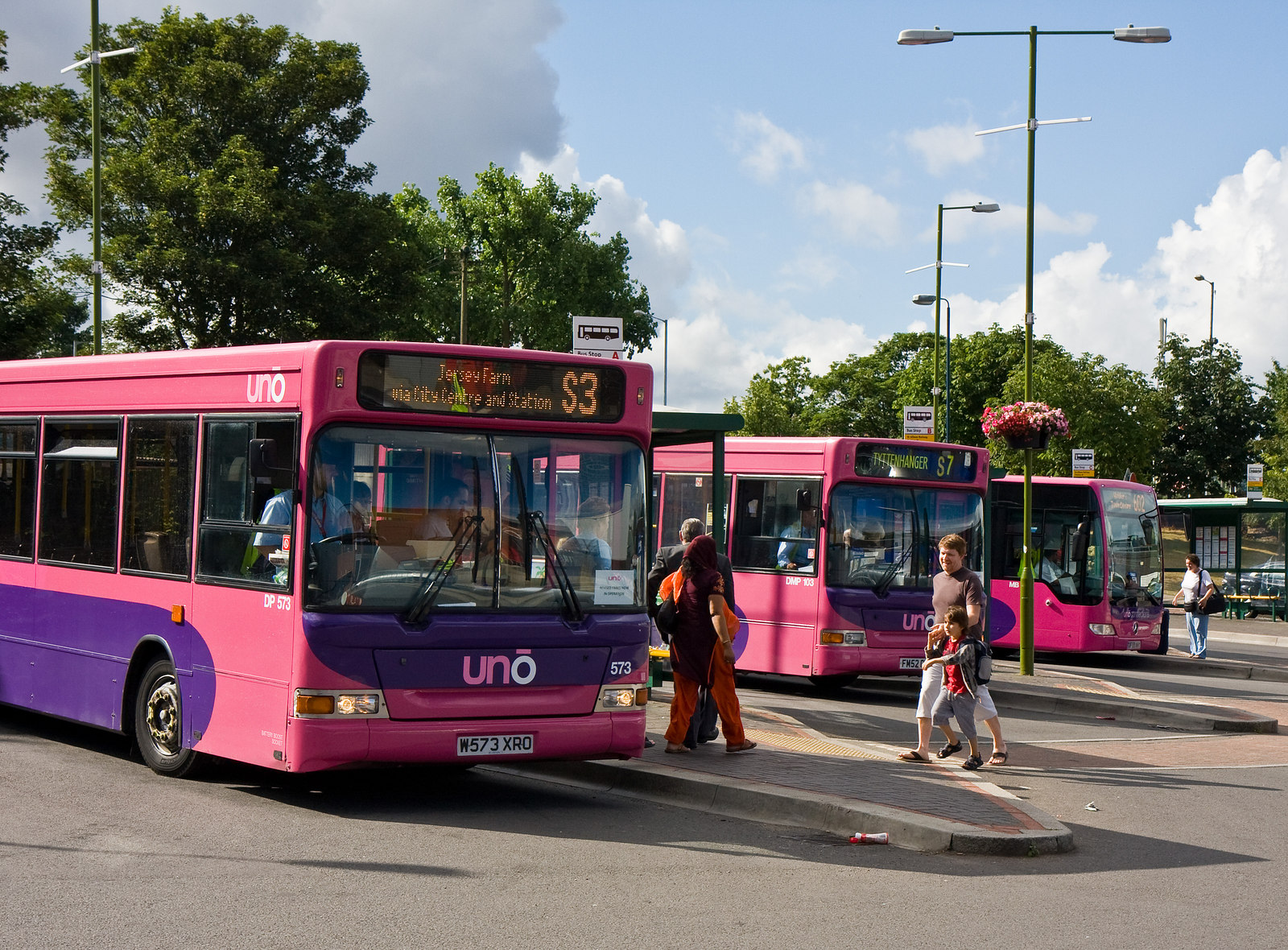
Uno Plaxton Pointer MPD buses at St Albans in July 2010

In March 2008, Uno purchased Centrebus's St Albans garage, taking over all Centrebus routes operating from there, including the S St Albans City route network, PB1 (a Potters Bar local route), various routes connecting St Albans with outlying towns and housing estates and a number of schools services provided under contract to Hertfordshire County Council.

In April 2009, several former Centrebus services were integrated into the main network (mainly as services 620 and 621) while one further route (304) provided under contract to Hertfordshire County Council was transferred to Arriva Herts & Essex.

In March 2010, a number of the routes around Hatfield and Welwyn Garden City, that only ran a couple of times a day or on one day a week, were lost to Sullivan Buses. The evening 620 service contract was also lost to Arriva Herts & Essex. The 694 service, introduced in September 2009 as a park and ride service between College Lane and Stanborough Lakes in WGC, was axed completely.

In September 2011, changes were made to routes 607, 610, 615, 625, 635, 658, 659 (frequency changes/new services); route 700 (reduction in service as result of 625/635 changes; routes 602, 603, 622, 634, 636 and 712 (general timing changes) and withdrawal of route 641, with assurances that the peak hour connection would be kept on the route 341.

However, in January 2012, the peak hour connection was lost from 341, along with shortening of some early and late journeys on the 602, 603, 620, 621, 622, 625, 635, 658 and PB1 services; the withdrawal of routes 604 and 634 outside of peak; and changing all evening 644 buses to run via Barnet via route 614).

In March 2015, Uno took the 797 Green Line route that previously operated from Stevenage to London Victoria (Green Line Coach Station) on, operating a shortened version of the route between London and Hatfield, on weekdays. The service was withdrawn the following year.

== Garages ==
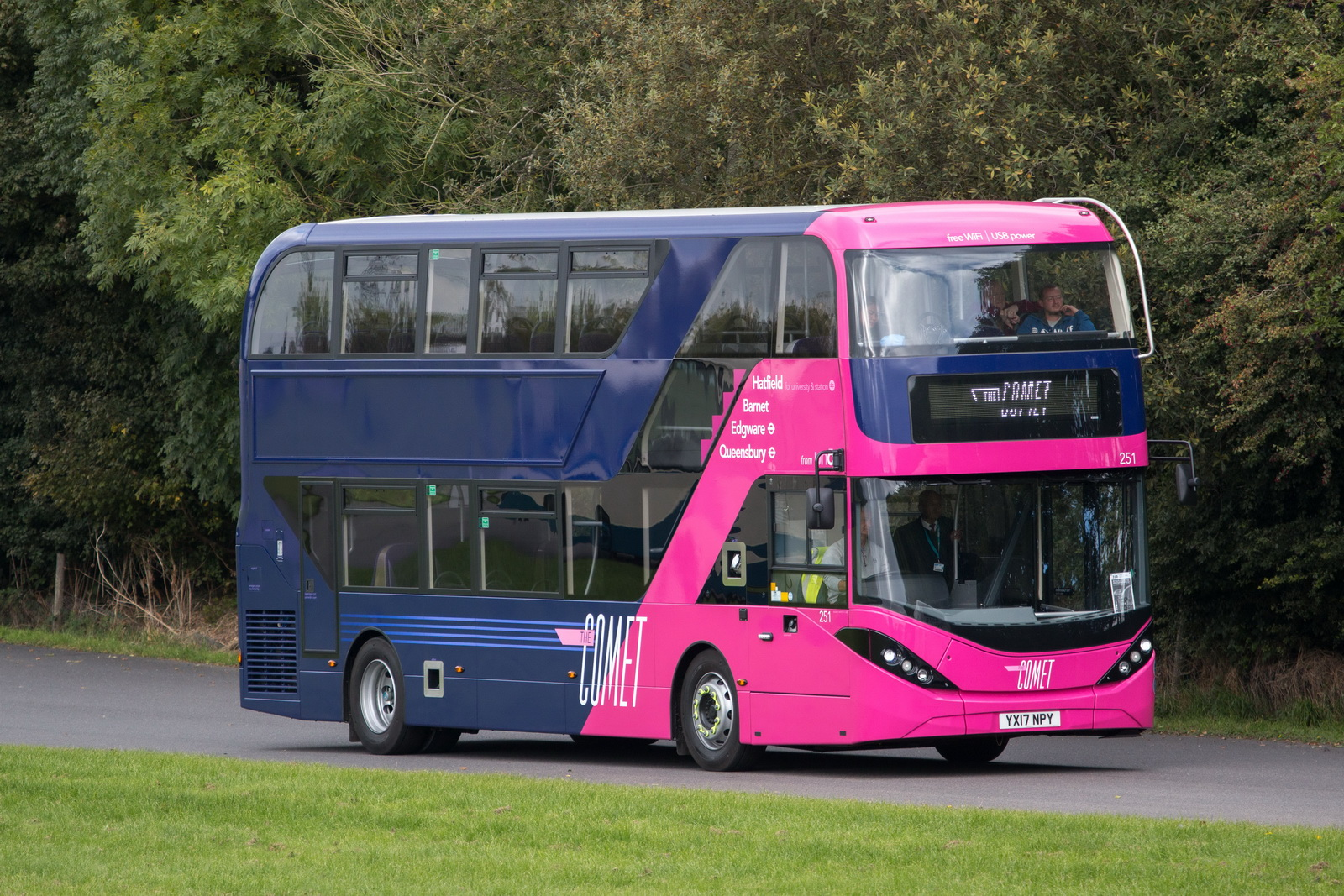
An Alexander Dennis Enviro400 City branded for The Comet at Showbus 2017

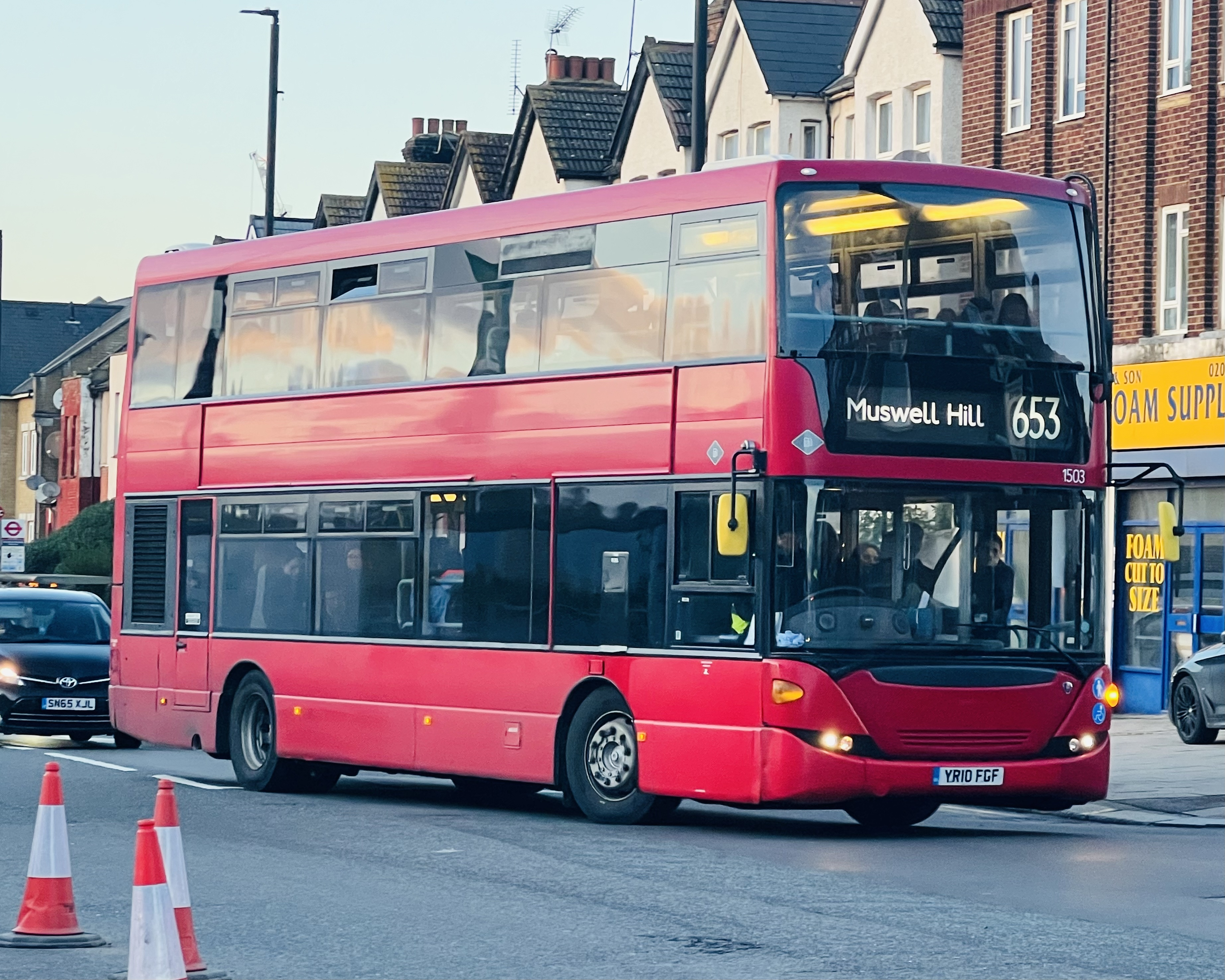
A Scania OmniCity on TfL route 653 in West Hendon

Uno operates two bus garages.

=== Hatfield (HF) ===
Hatfield garage operates routes 242, 243, 341, 602, 610, 614, 625, 635, 641, 644, 653, 843, SHTL and X10. Hatfield garage also operates Transport for London-contracted routes 292, 298, 383, 628, 643, 653, 683, 688 and 699.

==== History ====
Uno's main bus garage is a garage that was purpose-built in 2003 on Gypsy Moth Avenue in the Hatfield Business Park.

In September 2017, Uno launched a fleet of six brand-new, high specification buses on routes 614 and 644 between Hatfield and Queensbury, rebranded by the company as The Comet. The buses used are Alexander Dennis Enviro400 City double deckers.

At the end of May 2018, Uno started operating six brand-new single decker MCV Evora buses on the Volvo B8RLE chassis. These buses were branded Dragonfly, in reference to Hatfield's aircraft heritage, and allocated to route 610 (Luton - Hatfield). The buses feature WiFi, USB charging sockets, on-board stop announcements and an innovative sofa at the front.

In February 2019, further investment by the company saw a fleet of 8 buses launched under the Tigermoth brand for the 653 route - each bus named after the first eight female pilots from the Air Transport Auxiliary (ATA) - Joan Hughes, Margaret Cunnison, Mona Friedlander, Rosemary Rees, Marion Wilberforce, Margaret Fairweather, Gabrielle Patterson, and Winifred Crossley Fair - who were based at Hatfield in the Second World War.

In March 2025, Uno took delivery of and began operating 5 BYD B12 battery electric buses, from an overall order of 27. These buses were funded with assistance from Hertfordshire County Council and the Department for Transport, under the Zero Emissions Bus Regional Areas (ZEBRA) scheme. The first 5 were initially set to operate the Angerlands Park and Ride service, with the remaining vehicles set to be introduced gradually over the following 12 months. They have a maximum passenger capacity of 93, and a range of over 300 miles before requiring a return to the depot for a recharge.

=== Cranfield ===
Cranfield garage operates routes C1, C2, C3, C5, C10, C11 and CX.

== Former garages ==
=== St Albans ===
St Albans garage operated routes 620, 621, PB1, S1, S2, S3, S4, S5, S7 and S9.

==== History ====
Following the takeover of Centrebus' St Albans operations, Uno continued to operate them from St Albans garage. However, this was subsequently closed and operations consolidated into Hatfield.

=== Northampton ===
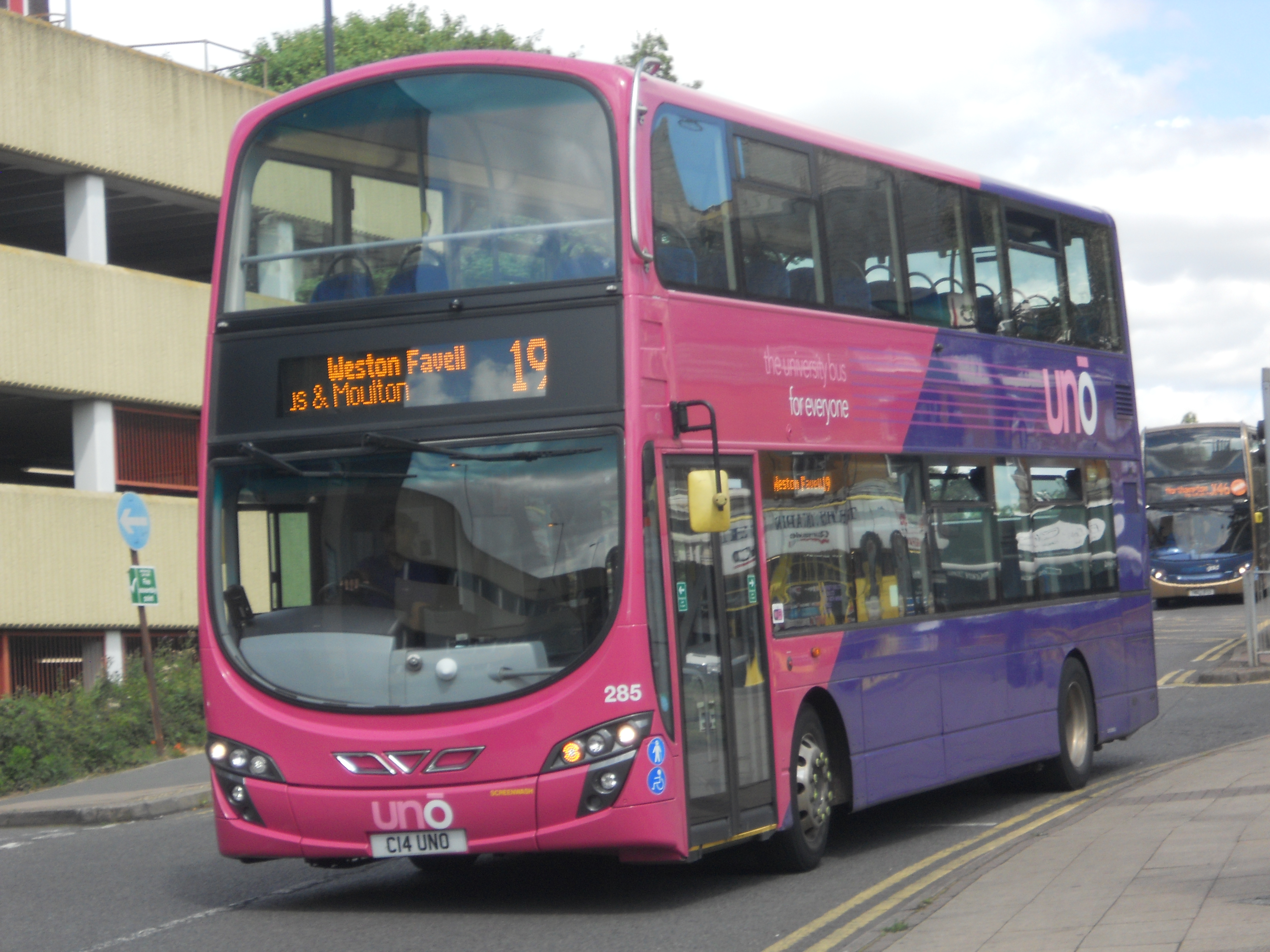
A Wright Eclipse Gemini bodied Volvo B9TL retrofitted with Wright Eclipse Gemini 2 bodywork in Northampton

Northampton garage operated routes 18, 19, 19A, 21, 59 and 60.

==== History ====
As a result of winning the Northampton University contracts a depot had opened at the Park Campus of the university by September 2012. This closed with the redevelopment of the university site and the depot moved to Riverside Industrial Estate. The Riverside depot closed in March 2024 when Uno's Northampton services ceased. A similar arrangement also operates at Cranfield University following initiation of services between Milton Keynes and Bedford in September 2013.

== Ticketing ==
The company participates in various county-wide ticketing schemes where appropriate, such as Plusbus (discounted combined rail and bus tickets), Intalink Connect (a multi-operator ticket allowing unlimited travel in various "zones" around Hertfordshire), and discounted travel for children and young adults with a Hertfordshire SaverCard.

Ticket machines on non-TfL services are supplied by Ticketer.

The company have their own mobile ticketing app, which allows passengers to buy their ticket before they travel and pay with credit or debit cards.
