= Janet Hendry =

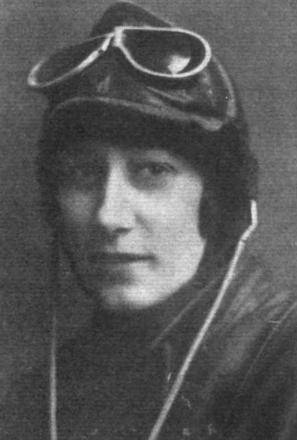
- Janet Hendry in Flight magazine, 21 March 1929
- Born: October 23, 1906; Ardrossan, Ayrshire, Scotland
- Died: February 21, 2004 (aged 97)
- Known for: First woman pilot in Scotland
- Spouse: James Murray
- Children: 2, Henry Murray and Fiona Roger (née Murray)

Janet Hendry (23 October 1906– 21 February 2004) was a Scottish pilot, and one of the pioneers of aviation in Scotland who had the distinction of being the first woman pilot in the country.

== Early life ==
Janet Hendry was born in Ardrossan, Ayrshire on 23 October 1906 to Annie and Robert Hendry F.S.I. Hendry went to The Park School in Glasgow from 1912 to 1924. She then left Scotland and spent the next two years in Switzerland, where she studied at the Riante Rive in Lausanne. It was here that she completed her studies and perfected her French.

== Flying career ==
Hendry initially took up flying as a hobby saying “I do not find it difficult at all, and, like motoring, it merely requires a certain amount of nerve. If a person has that amount of nerve, he or she will soon be able to ‘control a plane without trouble’ ’’ She became the first female member of the Scottish Flying Club on 12 September 1927; the club had been founded in April that year by 5 male former pilots, who had all served in the First World War. As a result of her being the first woman member of the Club, Lord Weir of Eastwood, the President of the Club was required to change the rules “of ladies not being allowed on the aerodrome”.

In those very early days when the Scottish Flying Club was becoming established, it was reliant on the support of its members to ensure it was on sound financial footing. This included Hendry, who along with her parents hosted various fund-raising events at her home, Crosslees House, Thornliebank, Renfrewshire to help raise funds for the club. Other notable female members of the Club a few years later were Winifred Drinkwater, the first woman in the world to hold a commercial pilot’s licence, and Margaret Cunnison and Margaret Fairweather who were both pilots in the Air Transport Auxiliary during the Second World War.

In 1928 Hendry was one of only 9 women in Great Britain that year who gained the Aviator’s Certificate of the Royal Aero Club. Hendry was based at Renfrew Aerodrome and trained under the supervision of First World War hero Captain John Houston MC, chief instructor of the Scottish Flying Club. She received licence number 8473, flying a De Havilland DH.60 Moth, on 3 December 1928, becoming Scotland’s first woman pilot. This was shortly before Amy Johnson received her licence the following year. The report from the Scottish Flying Club for the week ending 9 December 1928 in Flight magazine described this event thus:

‘Practically nothing of interest, either with regard to flying or general matters, falls to be recorded this week. Weather conditions have been a peculiar mixture of blue skies, gales and minor snowstorms, yet, withal, our total flying time for the week is quite satisfactory. On Monday Miss J. Hendry completed her “A” Licence tests most satisfactorily, and we look forward to congratulating her as the first lady holder of an “A” Licence in Scotland.’.

Hendry’s experience was with open cockpit flying which differed markedly from today's commercial flights, with navigation done largely through the recognition of local landmarks. Indeed, Hendry would tell of occasions when unsure of her way, she had to fly low enough to read train station signs in order to get her bearings. In poor weather, low cloud often left her following roads and railway tracks at altitudes now unthinkable simply to get her back to the airstrip.

Hendry's flying came to an abrupt end in 1932 at the request of her father, following the death of her brother Johnny in a car crash. Having lost one child, Hendry's father was not willing to risk another, and he asked her to stop flying, which she did. As a result, she relinquished her membership of the Scottish Flying Club.

== Later life ==
She married James Murray, a marine engineer, on 12 September 1940. Her love of travel continued throughout her life and following her flying career this was initially by motor car. She travelled extensively in Europe including through Holland, Belgium, Germany, France and Italy, on trips between 1932 and 1938. Following the War she continued to travel the globe widely, including Latin America and Rio de Janeiro, Brazil in 1957.
