= Gabrielle Patterson =

British aviator (1905–1968)

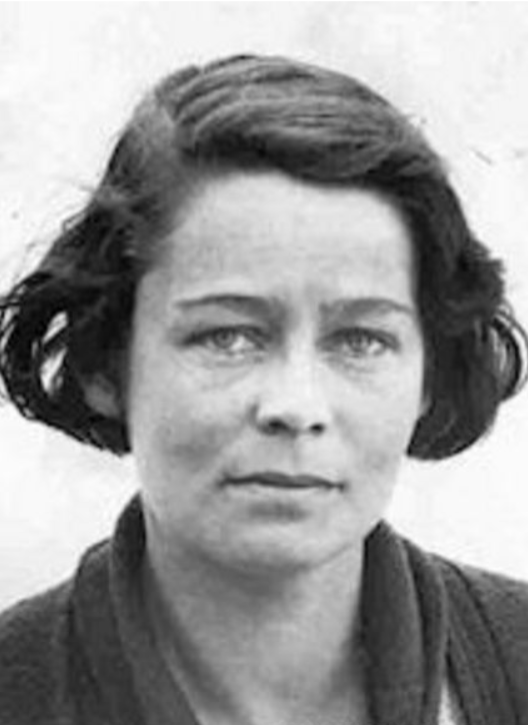
- Gabrielle Patterson in 1934
- Born: Gabrielle Ruth Millicent Burr; 6 July 1905; Paddington, London, England
- Died: 31 October 1968 (aged 63); High Wycombe, Buckinghamshire, England
- Education: Manchester University, Sorbonne
- Occupations: pilot, instructor
- Employer: Air Transport Auxiliary
- Known for: Britain's first woman flying instructor

Gabrielle Ruth Millicent Patterson (née Burr; 1905–1968) was a British aviator who worked for the Air Transport Auxiliary. She was Britain's first woman flying instructor.

== Early life ==
She was born in Maida Vale in London on 6 July 1905. She was the eldest of four children. Her father, Malcolm Burr, a mining engineer, earned his money as a teacher although his passion was insects. Her mother Clara Millicent Goode and her siblings moved with their father and she received an education in various European locations "including Paris, Berlin, Budapest, and Vienna". She became company secretary at her mother's family firm.

She was not tall but she was well off so she was able to gain a pilots licence and subsequently an instructors licence in 1931 in time for a flying event at Reading with other women pilots including Amy Johnson. She did not court publicity but she did in time attract attention.

Gabrielle Burr met her husband Arthur Patterson around the same time, and taught him to fly. They were married in June 1931 and their only child, a boy named Ian was born the following year. The couple both worked in airfields and bought a Miles Hawk plane. From May 1936 until August 1937 she was the instructor at the South Staffordshire Aero Club at the newly opened Walsall Airfield. Gabrielle Patterson earned a 'B' licence and began working as a commercial pilot for Silvertown Lubricants Ltd. then worked in sales management for Miles Aircraft Company, which was part owned by another pilot Maxine 'Blossom' Miles, who designed the Miles Hawk G-ACIZ aircraft which Patterson flew in the King's Cup Air Race in 1934.

For the opening of Chigwell aerodrome (the aerodrome was being made available to the Women's Air Reserve) in 1938 Patterson arranged an aerial event which included a number of aerial displays including those of representatives from other countries - including the German women pilots Melitta von Stauffenberg and Elly Beinhorn - against a backdrop of increased tension in Europe, the event coinciding with the Munich Crisis

== Second World War ==
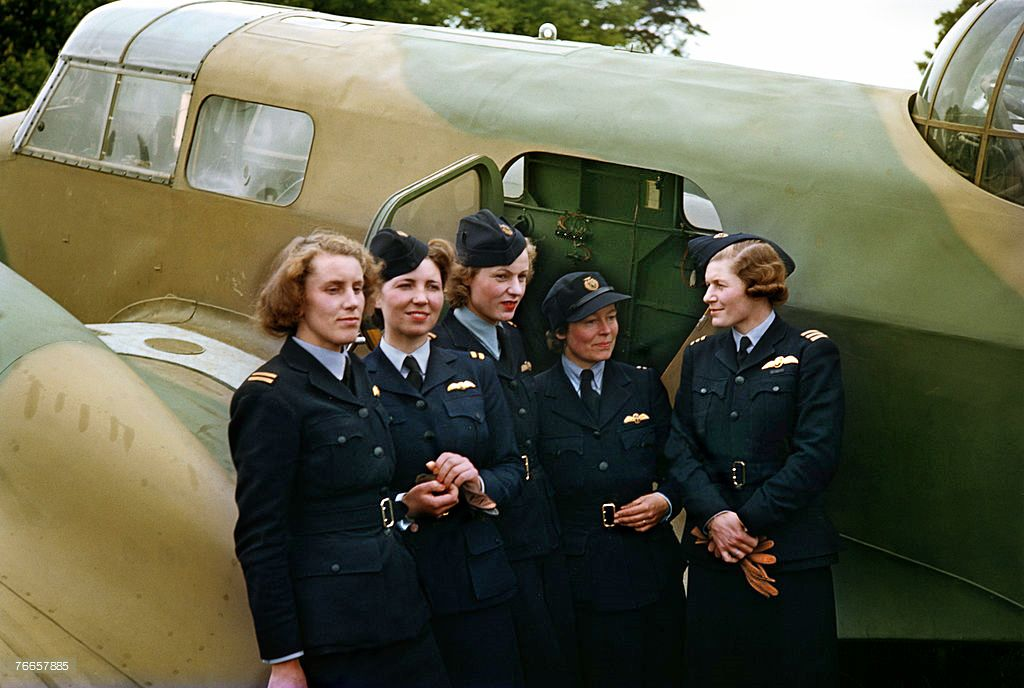
Five ATA flyers Lettice Curtis, Jenny Broad, Audrey Sale-Barker, Gabrielle Patterson and Pauline Gower in 1942 by an Airspeed Oxford trainer

When war broke out in 1939 she join the Air Transport Auxiliary (ATA). She was already well known as leader of the National Women’s Air Reserve as part of which she had taught fellow ATA pilot Margot Gore to fly and trained her as a flight instructor. She was the first woman flying instructor and she had several years experience as an instructor before she joined.

She became one of the ATA's first eight pilots alongside Joan Hughes, Margaret Cunnison, Mona Friedlander, Rosemary Rees, Marion Wilberforce, Margaret Fairweather, and Winifred Crossley Fair, under the command of Pauline Gower.

One of their first tasks was to deliver eight Tiger Moth planes to Scotland. They would need to fly in winter in these open cockpit planes. Patterson had a range of over twenty aircraft that she could fly although her short height was noted as a restriction on her abilities. In time Pauline Gower who had recruited the first eight was able to argue that they should be allowed to fly any type of aircraft. In 1943 they achieved pay parity with male pilots. Before that they had routinely been paid only 80% of the male wage.

In 1941, she approached the Women's Engineering Society (of which she was a member) to create the Amy Johnson Memorial Fund, in memory of her ATA colleague and former Women's Engineering Society president. Patterson devoted a lot of time and energy toward the project and created its initial publicity materials.

Due to illness Patterson was grounded in 1943 and left the ATA.

== Later life ==
When the war ended Patterson continued flying and instructing as the commandant of the Women’s Junior Air Corps until 1950. She taught flying at aero clubs until she had to stop for medical reasons following which she took a degree at Manchester University from 1954 to 1956. In 1956 she went to study through a scholarship at the Sorbonne, and moved to France. After falling ill she returned to the UK to live with her sisters. She died of cancer on 31 October 1968 and her ashes were released over White Waltham Airfield.

== Legacy ==
A bus company in Hatfield named its eight buses after the "first eight" of the Tiger Moth pilots in the ATA, including Gabrielle Patterson. The fifteen surviving women members of the ATA (and 100 surviving male pilots) were given a special award in 2008 by the Prime Minister Gordon Brown.
