= Pauline Gower =

British pilot and writer (1910–1947)

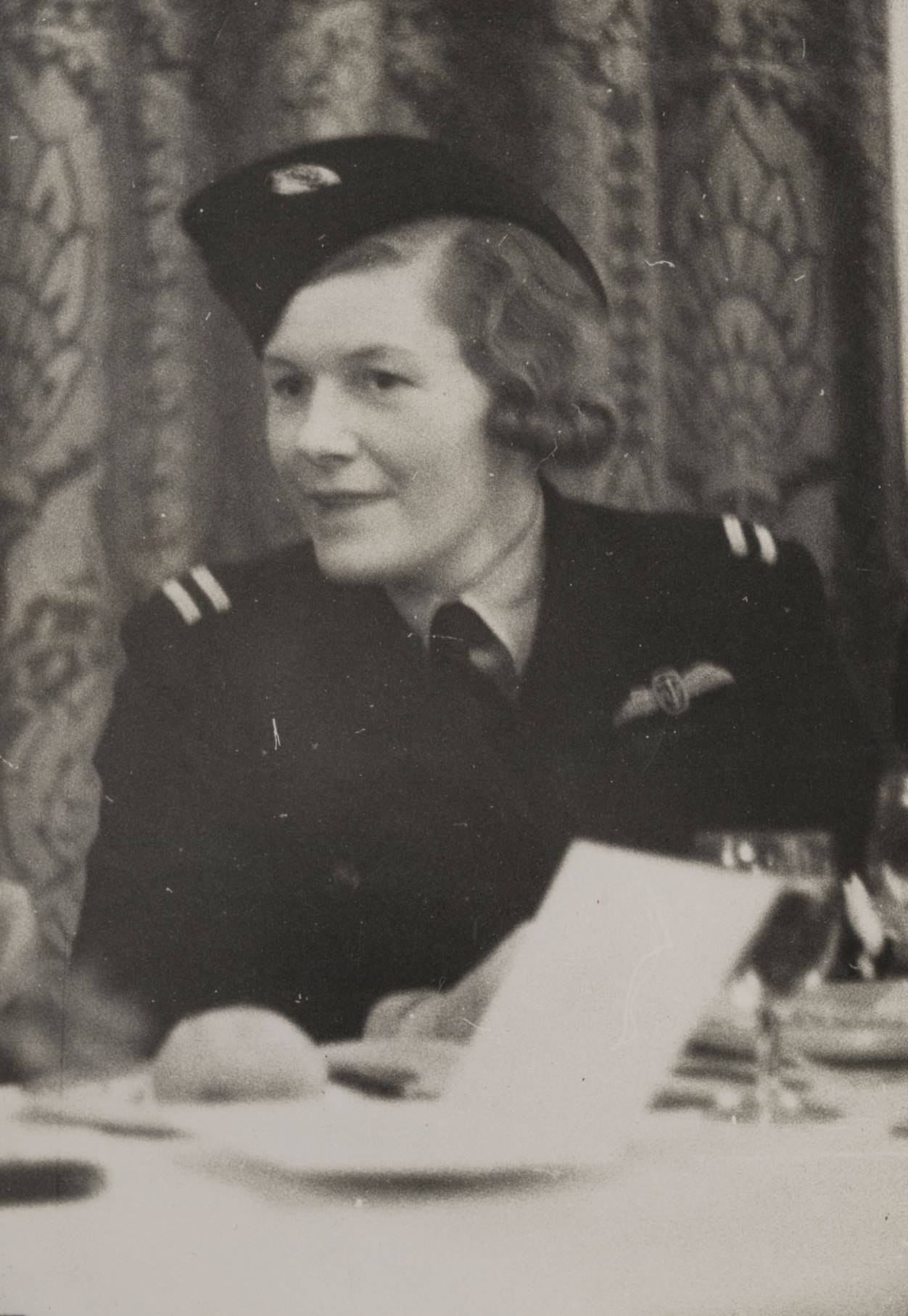
- Pauline Gower at a Women's Engineering Society awards dinner in the 1940s
- Born: Pauline Mary de Peauly Gower; 22 July 1910; Tunbridge Wells, Kent, England
- Died: 2 March 1947 (aged 36); Royal Tunbridge Wells, Kent, England
- Occupation: Pilot
- Spouse: William Cusack Fahie (m. 1945)
- Children: 2
- Father: Sir Robert Gower

Pauline Mary de Peauly Gower Fahie (22 July 1910 – 2 March 1947) was a British pilot and writer who established the women's branch of the Air Transport Auxiliary during the Second World War.

== Early life and education ==
Pauline Mary de Peauly Gower was born on 22 July 1910 to Dorothy Susie Eleanor (née Wills) (1882-1936) and Sir Robert Gower, MP. She had an older sister, named Dorothy Vaughan after their mother and they grew up at Sandown Court in Tunbridge Wells.

Pauline Gower was educated at Beechwood Sacred Heart School, which was run by Mother Ashton-Case, a cousin of her mother. She was a strong student and excelled at music and sport. At seventeen she became seriously ill and had to have a mastoidectomy which affected her health, particularly her lungs, for the rest of her life. Leaving school at 18, Gower did a season as a debutant, avoided finishing school in Paris and decided she needed a profession in which to earn her living.

== Flying ==
Gower first flew with Alan Cobham and was fascinated by flying. Gower earned her pilot's licence (no. 9442 from the Royal Aero Club) on 4 September 1930 at the Phillips and Powis school of flying at Woodley Aerodrome, Reading, flying a De Havilland DH.60 Moth.

Gower met Dorothy Spicer at the London Aeroplane Club at Stag Lane Aerodrome and they became friends. In August 1931 they established a joy-riding and air taxi service in Kent. Gower was licensed to carry passengers for 'hire or reward', and held a 'B' Pilot's licence after completing the test requirements which included a solo night flight and one hundred hours plus of flying in the day. Spicer was qualified as a ground engineer and held an 'A' (private) pilot's licence. They hired a plane and later bought a Gypsy Moth for the business, but struggled to make a living so decided to join the Crimson Fleet air circus and later the British Hospitals' air pageant.

== Piloting career ==
In 1932, to support British Hospitals, they toured the country with an Air Circus, giving air pageants in 200 towns. They joined the Aeronautical Section of the Women's Engineering Society in 1932. Gower also wrote for Girl's Own Paper and Chatterbox and published a collection of poetry, Piffling Poems for Pilots, in 1934. As a writer she was acquainted with W. E. Johns whose character Worrals was based on herself as well as Amy Johnson.

== Engineering work ==
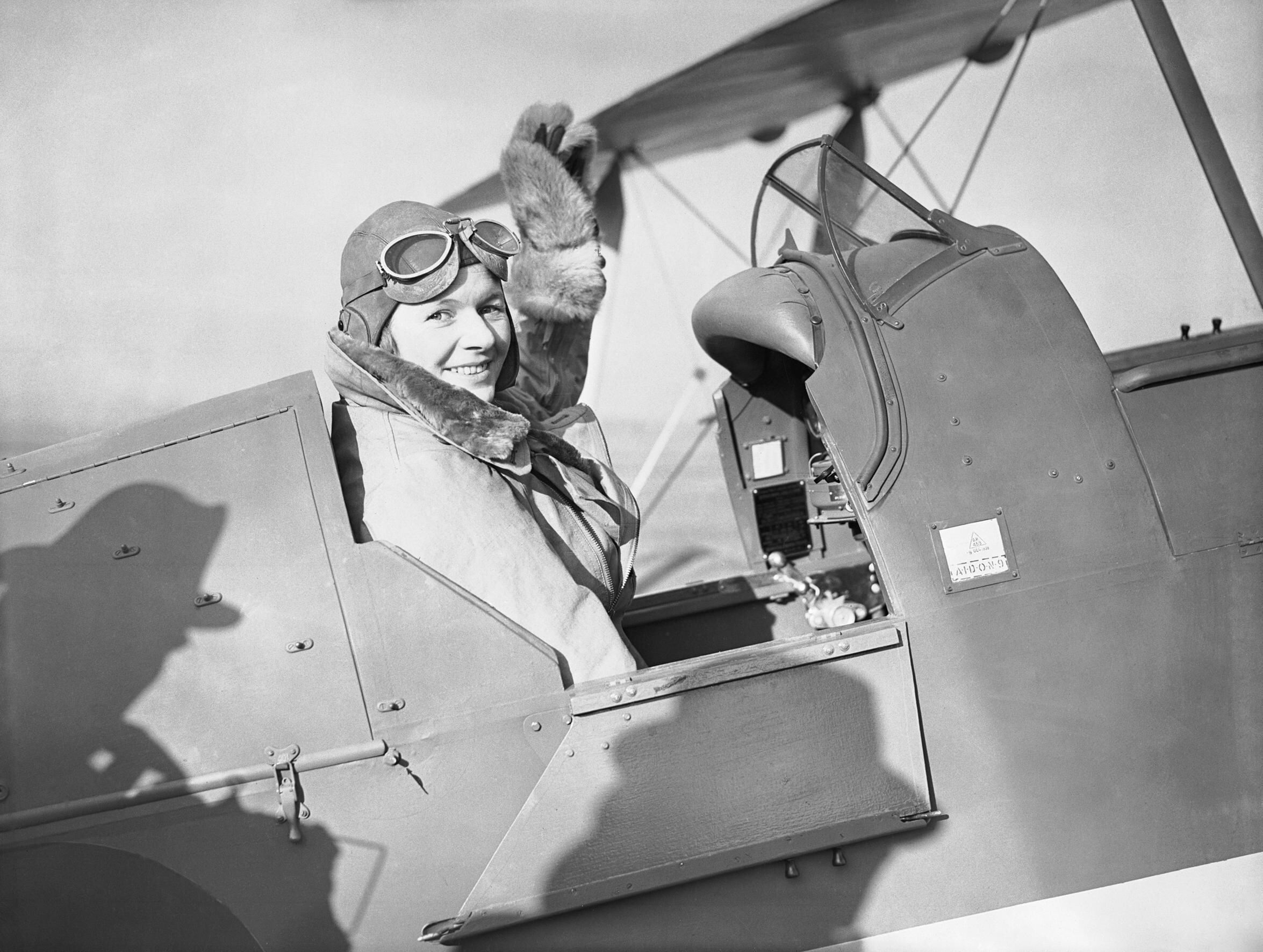
Gower in the cockpit of a de Havilland Tiger Moth

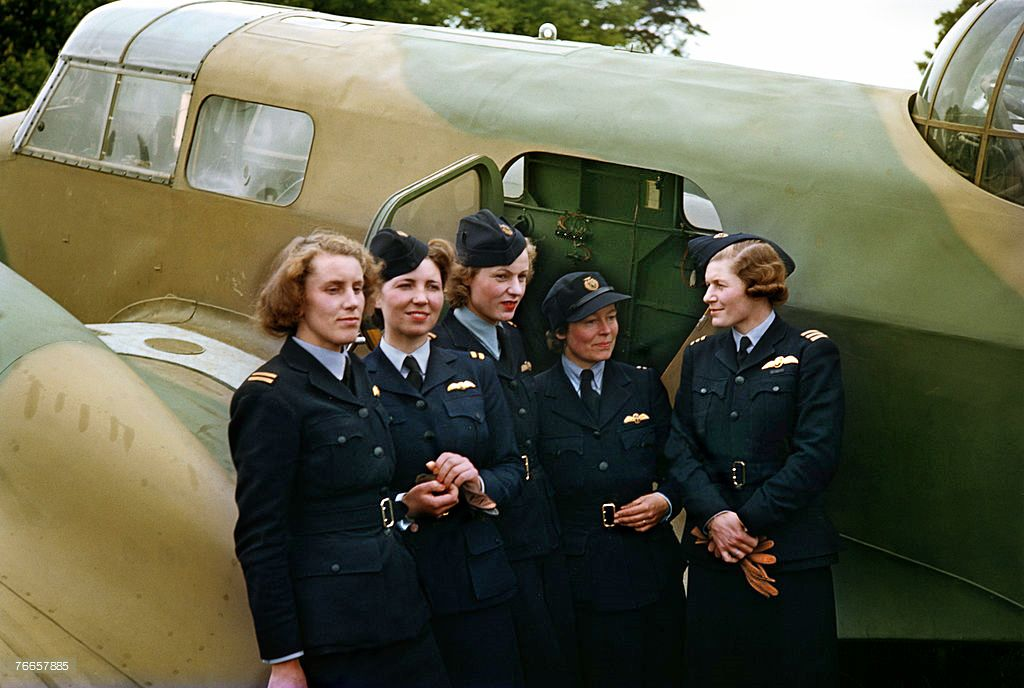
Five ATA flyers Lettice Curtis, Jenny Broad, Audrey Sale-Barker, Gabrielle Patterson and Gower

In 1935 she was appointed as a council member for the Women's Engineering Society. She chaired a meeting on "The History of British Airships", where Mr. M. Langley championed the airboat and Hon. A. F. de Moleyns the airship.

In 1936, Gower was the first woman to be awarded the Air Ministry's Second Class Navigator's Licence. Later that year, Gower and her colleague Dorothy Spicer ('daring aeronauts') presented a technical paper at the Women's Engineering Society Annual General Meeting on the treatment of metals for aircraft engineers.

In 1938, she was appointed a civil defence commissioner in London with the Civil Air Guard. That year her work on women in aviation—Women with Wings—was published.

== Air Transport Auxiliary ==
On the outbreak of the Second World War, Gower made use of her high-level connections to propose the establishment of a women's section in the new Air Transport Auxiliary —the ATA would be responsible for ferrying military aircraft from factory or repair facility to storage unit or operational unit—to the authorities. Based at Hatfield, Gower formed a ferry pool, initially made up of eight female pilots in December 1939. Joan Hughes, Margaret Cunnison, Mona Friedlander, Rosemary Rees, Marion Wilberforce, Margaret Fairweather, Gabrielle Patterson and Winifred Crossley Fair were known as the First Eight.

Gower was appointed as the head of the women's branch, and commenced the selection and testing of women pilots, the first eight being appointed by the ATA on 1 January 1940. Early members included ice-hockey international Mona Friedlander, Margaret Fairweather (Lord Runciman's daughter) and former ballet dancer Rona Rees. Later members included Amy Johnson, Lettice Curtis and former Olympic skier Lois Butler.

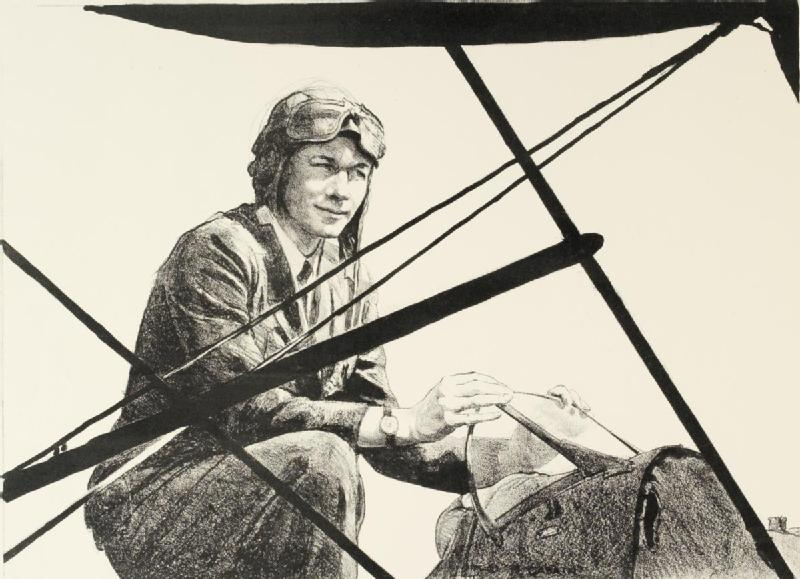
Captain Pauline Gower of the Women's Air Transport Auxiliary women's work in the War (other than the Services) by Ethel Gabain

In 1941, Gower's portrait was created by Ethel Léontine Gabain as part of a series commissioned by the War Artists Advisory Committee, it is now held by the Imperial War Museum.

Gower received the MBE for her services in 1942 In time Gower was able to argue that women in the ATA should be allowed to fly any type of aircraft. In 1943 they achieved pay parity with male pilots. Before that they had routinely been paid only 80% of the male wage.

The British Library holds a recording of Gower talking about her flying experiences over Kent during a night flight as well as her opinions of women being pilots.

Gower received a Harmon Trophy award posthumously in 1950.

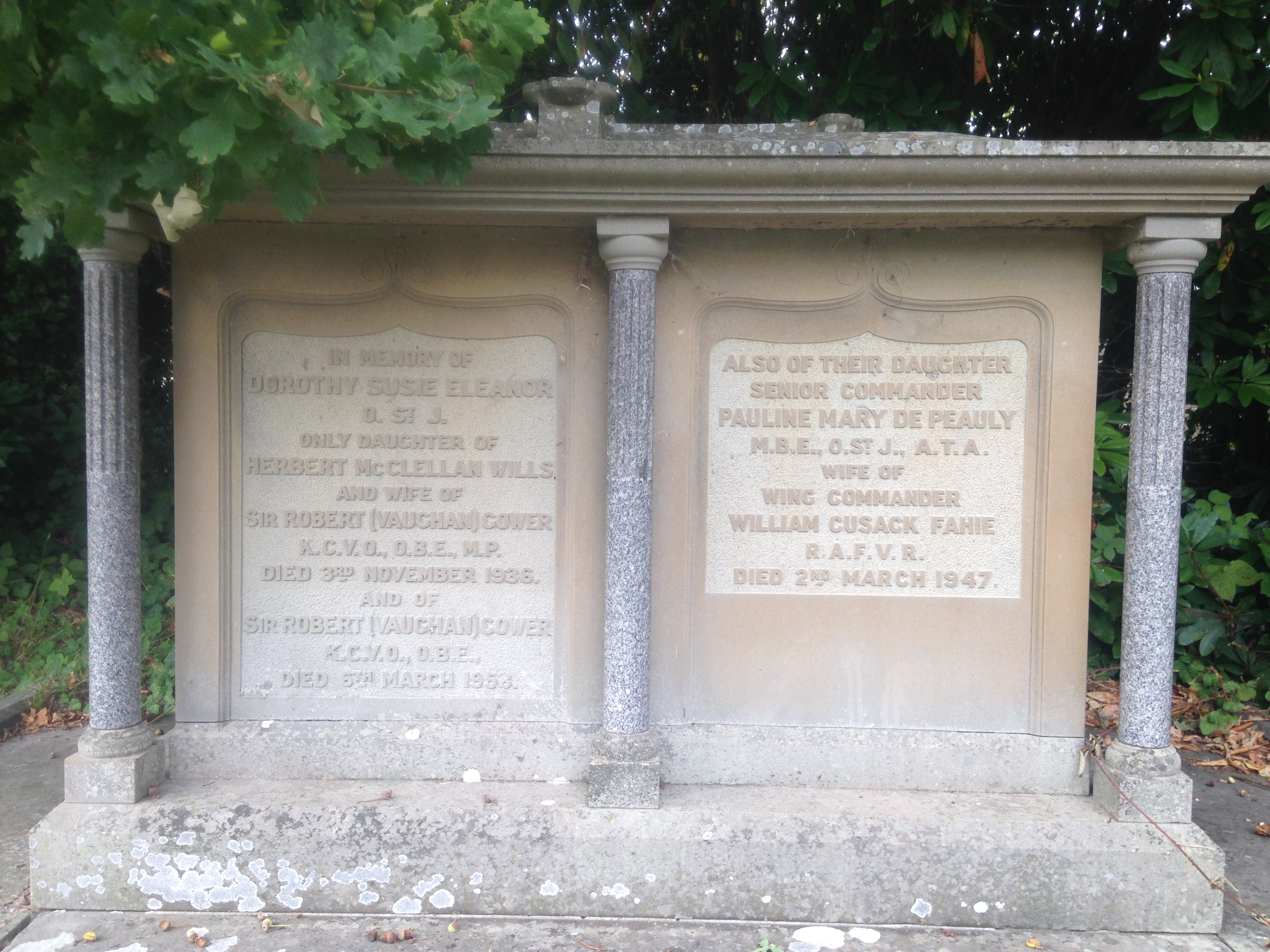
Pauline Gower's family memorial Tunbridge Wells Kent and Sussex Cemetery and Crematorium

== Recognition ==
A bus company in Hatfield named its eight buses after the "first eight" of the Tiger Moth pilots in the ATA, including Gower.

== Personal life ==
Gower married Wing Commander William Cusack "Bill" Fahie (b. Dublin 1918 - d. South Africa 1972) in 1945. She died on 2 March 1947 at her home, 2 The Vale, Chelsea, after giving birth to twin sons, Paul and Michael, who survived. She was buried on 7 March 1947 at the Kent and Sussex Crematorium and Cemetery in Tunbridge Wells.

== Sources ==
- Curtis, Lettice, The Forgotten Pilots, Nelson Saunders, Olney, Bucks, 1985; ISBN 0-947750-02-9
- Edwards, Owen Dudley, "The Battle of Britain and Children's Literature" in Paul Addison & Jeremy A. Crang (eds), The Burning Blue: a new history of the Battle of Britain. London: Pimlico, 2000; ISBN 0-7126-6475-0
- Edwards, Owen Dudley, British Children's Fiction of the Second World War. Edinburgh: Edinburgh University Press, 2007; ISBN 0-7486-1651-9
- Fahie, Michael, A Harvest of Memories: The Life of Pauline Gower, MBE. Peterborough: GMS Enterprises, 1995; ISBN 1-870384-37-7
- Whittell, Giles, Spitfire Women of World War II. (Hardcover) November 2007 by Harper Press; ISBN 0007235356 (ISBN 9780007235353)
