= Winifred Crossley Fair =

British aviator (1906–1984)

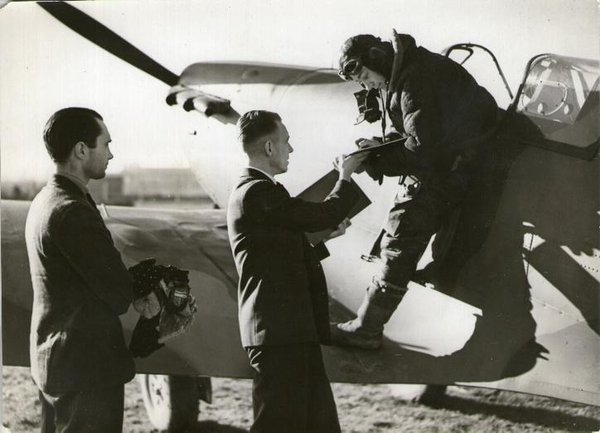
- Born: Winifred Mary Harrisson; 9 January 1906; St Neots, Cambridgeshire, England
- Died: 27 March 1984 (aged 78)
- Occupation: Pilot
- Known for: The first woman to be checked out on a Hurricane fighter
- Spouse: Peter Fair

Winifred Crossley (9 January 1906 – 27 March 1984) was a British aviator who was the first woman to be checked out on a Hurricane fighter. She was one of the First Eight, the initial group of women pilots to join the Air Transport Auxiliary.

== Early life ==
Winifred Mary Harrisson was born on 9 January 1906 in St Neots, Cambridgeshire, England, to Winifred Edith and Ernest Henry Harrisson, a general medical practitioner. She had a twin sister Daphne Louisa, an older brother John and a younger brother George. In the summer of 1926 she married James Francis Crossley.

== Career ==
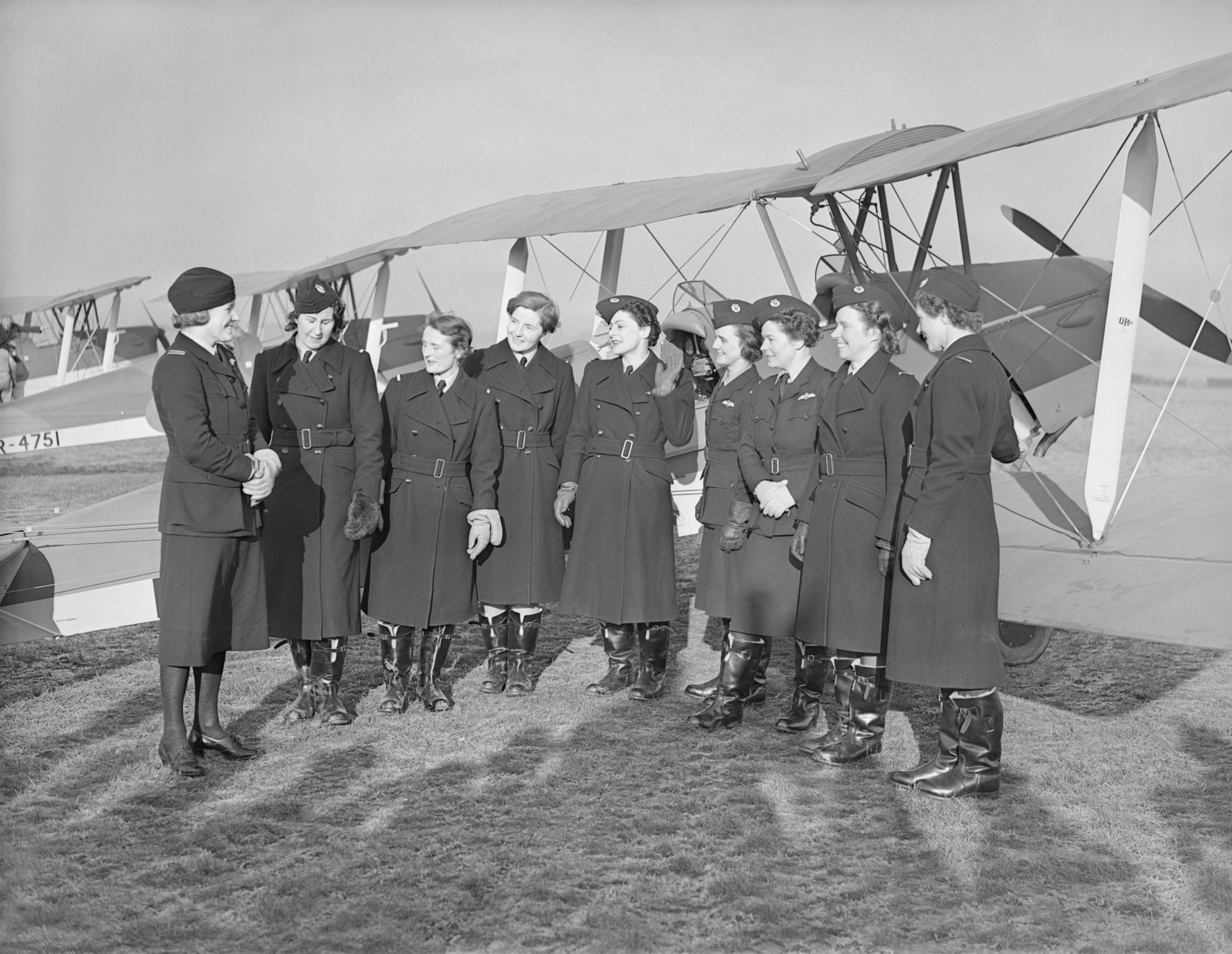
The Air Transport Auxiliary, 1939–1945. C389

Winifred "Winnie" Crossley was a pilot before the start of the Second World War. She had worked by towing banners for aerial advertising for five years. She had also been a stunt pilot in an air circus. In 1935, her father delivered and cared for the St Neots Quads, the first British quadruplets to survive. The babies needed special care and delivery of human milk from a London hospital, and Crossley was involved in "making arrangements to fly the milk from Hendon, landing on the common near St. Neots."

She was one of the first women (the "First Eight") to join the Air Transport Auxiliary (ATA), alongside Joan Hughes, Margaret Cunnison, Mona Friedlander, Gabrielle Patterson, Marion Wilberforce, Margaret Fairweather and Rosemary Rees, under the command of Pauline Gower. She served from 1940 to 1945. She became second in command at Ferry pool No. 5.

By 1940, Crossley was separated from her husband and rented a house called Abdale near the ATA Hatfield base, where she accommodated other ATA pilots and held social gatherings for them. She later married Peter Fair (1906–1961) an airline captain who was the head of BOAC's Bahamas Airways based in Nassau.

Winifred Crossley Fair died on 27 March 1984.

== Legacy ==
A bus company in Hatfield named its eight buses after the First Eight Tiger Moth pilots in the ATA, including Rees.

Fourteen years after her death in 2008, the fifteen surviving women members of the ATA (and 100 surviving male pilots) were given a special award by Prime Minister Gordon Brown.
