= Mona Friedlander =

British pilot

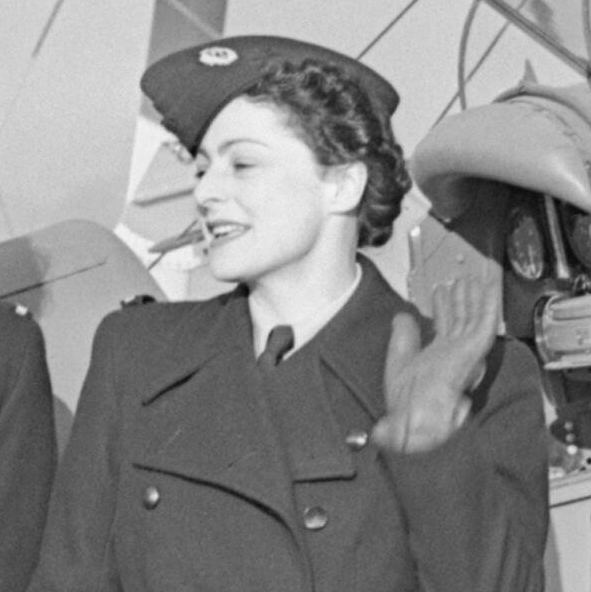
- Mona Friedlander in 1940
- Born: Mona Renee Vera Ernesta Friedlander; 2 June 1914; London, England
- Died: 24 December 1993 (aged 79); Halstock, Dorset, England
- Occupation: pilot
- Known for: founding pilot of the Air Transport Auxiliary

Mona Renee Vera Ernesta Forward (née Friedlander, 2 June 1914 – 24 December 1993) was a British pilot and one of the eight founding pilots who started the women's section of the Air Transport Auxiliary.

== Early life ==
Mona Renee Vera Ernesta Friedlander was born in Queensgate, London in June 1914. Her father was a rich banker and they lived in Park Lane. Age six her mother took her and her sister, who suffered from tuberculosis, to live in Paris. Friedlander went to school in Vienna, Switzerland and Germany, only returned to live in Britain age seventeen. She attended the LSE and took a secretarial course, which led to secretarial jobs. Age 21, she went to America as a secretary to a friend of her father. On her return, a friend took her to Brooklands, "gave me a couple of gins and tonics and sent me up in an aeroplane" and she became hooked on flying.

== Flying ==
She worked in a small aircraft factory near Brooklands and the machine place at Brooklands to understand the mechanics of flying. She took her 'B' licence (pilot's licence) Friedlander was issued with her licence (No. 14599) on 11 November 1936, having taken the test at Brooklands Flying Club in a De Havilland DH.60 Moth. She qualified as a 2nd class navigator and in night flying. Her parents initially funded her pursuit of a pilot's license, but they ended support with that goal achieved. Her father loved her flying, her mother was "horrified".

She wanted to train as a flying instructor and continued despite her parents objections by taking a job pulling aerial advertising banners. Some pilots would take off with the banner but Friedlander preferred to fly back at a defined height and pick up the banner. She flew banners around the Scottish coast, particularly Aberdeen. In the spring of 1939 she went to work for Air Taxis Ltd of Croydon, taking people up for joy rides and air taxi journeys and moved with them when the government moved the company to Manchester at the outbreak of the Second World War. In the 1939 Register she was listed as a pilot living in 16 Deansgate, Manchester. Friedland took the Air Transport Auxiliary test at Filton, Bristol having been written to because she had over 200 flying hours.

== Air Transport Auxiliary ==
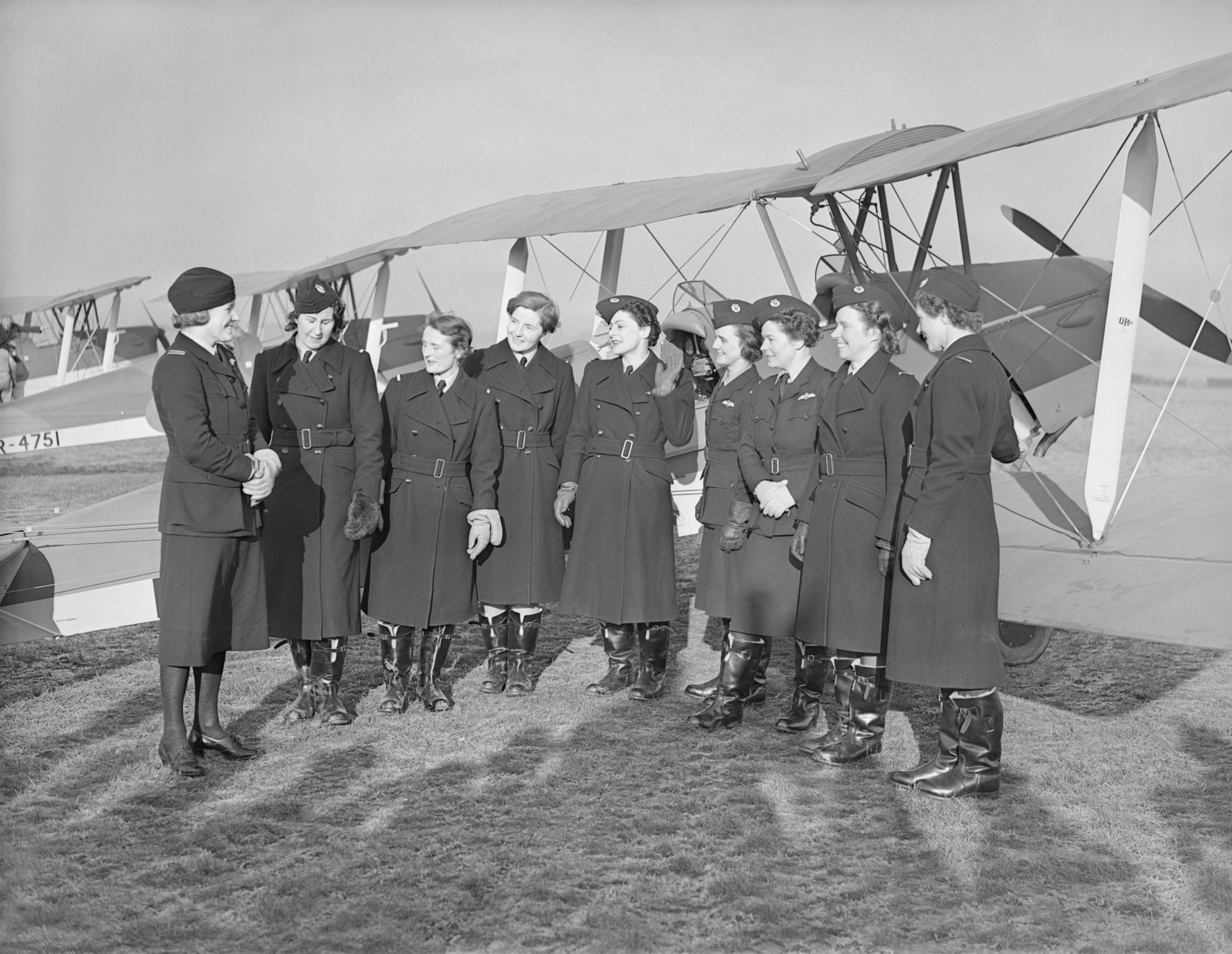
The founding ATA pilots and their Tiger Moths: left to right Pauline Gower, Winifred Crossley Fair, Margaret Cunnison, Hon. Margaret Fairweather, Mona Friedlander, Joan Hughes, Gabrielle Patterson, Rosemary Rees and Marion Wilberforce

Friedlander was one of the eight founding pilots in the women's section of the Air Transport Auxiliary (ATA) and started working at Hatfield airfield on 7 January 1940. Alongside Winifred Crossley Fair, Margaret Cunnison, Hon. Margaret Fairweather, Joan Hughes, Gabrielle Patterson, Rosemary Rees and Marion Wilberforce, they were known as the First Eight, all appointed by Commandant Pauline Gower.

The role was so new that she had to design and then get a tailor to make her uniform. Hers was based on the male uniform but with fewer pockets and in a lighter shade of blue. Friedlander did a lot of night flying as she would fly back and forth along a defined route so that gun batteries could use her plane to practice identifying her range and direction using their listening equipment and pick her out with their searchlights. It was known as Army Cooperation flying. The work was cold and initially she was unable to find a wireless operator to fly with her. Eventually one man proved amenable to flying with a female pilot. After that she had other willing crewmen. Her logbook was checked and signed every month by Pauline Gower.

In 1943 she was invalided out of the ATA and she took work as a censor. She was entrusted with inspecting press photographs to decide if they revealed secret information.

== Personal life ==
Mona Friedlander married Alan Forward in 1941 in Westminster.

Mona Forward died in Halstock, Dorset on Christmas Eve 1993 at the age of 79.

== Legacy ==
In 1985 the Imperial War Museum recorded her biography as an oral history.

A bus company in Hatfield named its eight buses after the "first eight" of the Tiger Moth pilots in the ATA, including Friedlander. The fifteen surviving women members of the ATA (and 100 surviving male pilots) were given a special award in 2008 by the Prime Minister Gordon Brown.
