= St Neots Quads =

First quadruplets to survive in the United Kingdom

The St Neots quads are a set of quadruplets who were born in 1935 to Doris Miles, living in Eynesbury, in St Neots, Huntingdonshire, England. A family doctor ensured that special attention was given to their care, and they were the first British quadruplets to survive more than a few days. They were regarded as a sensation by the press, and were sponsored by a baby formula manufacturer; they were frequently called on to be present at events for publicity purposes. At the end of 2025, only one of them was still alive.

== Birth and after ==
On 28 November 1935, Doris Miles gave birth to quadruplets. They were the first British quadruplets babies to survive more than a few days. In ante-natal check-ups Mrs Miles had been led to believe she was expecting twins, but later an X-ray indicated triplets.

Dr E H Harrisson, District Nurse Mailing, and Mrs Miles' mother delivered the babies. They were seven weeks premature, and were very underweight. Their toenails and fingernails had not yet formed, and they were unable to maintain body temperature without artificial aid. The fourth baby to be born needed artificial respiration for 50 minutes before he started to breathe independently.

The babies were Ann, weighing 3 lb 12 1/2 oz (1,720 g), Ernest 3 lb 5 oz (1,500 g), Paul 3 lb 7 oz (1,600 g), and Michael at 2 lb 13 oz (1,300 g). The babies were also unable to suckle properly at first, and were fed from a teaspoon by Mrs Miles' mother.

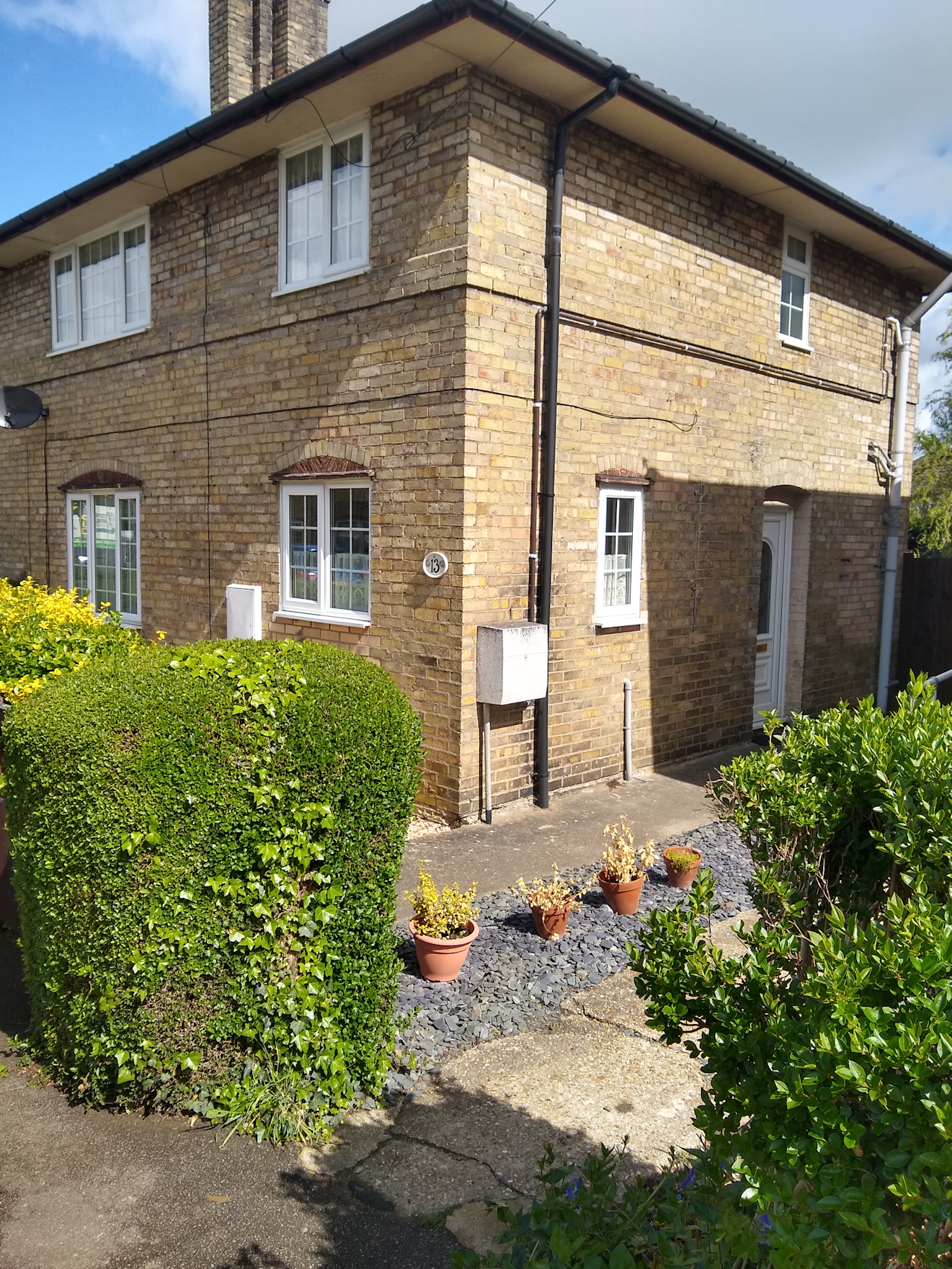
The house in Ferrars Avenue in Eynesbury where the quads were born

Newspaper reports soon publicised the birth:

St Neots Quadruplets Babies' Condition "Much Improved": The quadruplets – a girl and three boys – born on Thursday morning at the home of their parents, Mr. and Mrs. Walter Miles, in Ferrars Avenue, Eynesbury, St. Neots, were stated by Dr. Harrisson to be doing exceptionally well and to be very much improved yesterday. Mrs. Miles, too, was very comfortable, and the doctor was satisfied with her condition. A local business man has opened a fund to help Mr. and Mrs. Miles to rear their family, and Mr. A. J. Huckle, chairman of the local urban district council, is to suggest that the council should suitably recognize the event, especially as the quadruplets were born in one of the council houses. The quadruplets were christened at the house yesterday by Canon A. R. South Phillips, rector of Eynesbury.

== Initial media attention ==
The birth attracted worldwide attention. The British press immediately called them "The St Neots quads", and frequent reports of their progress were published in British and overseas newspapers.

The Times newspaper reported:

The Eynesbury quadruplets yesterday received the King's Bounty. Mrs. Miles, their mother, in the morning received a letter from Buckingham Palace, stating:- "The Keeper of the King's Privy Purse is commanded by his Majesty to pay the King's Bounty to Mrs. Miles, and, accordingly forwards herewith a cheque for £4."

Yesterday's report of the condition of the infants was quite satisfactory. One of the difficulties that have arisen is the necessity for taking human milk from London to St. Neots twice daily. Dr. Harrisson's daughter, Mrs. Winifred Crossley, who is an experienced pilot, is making arrangements to fly the milk from Hendon, landing on the common near St. Neots. Four nurses from the Hospital for Sick Children, Great Ormond Street, London, have been sent to St. Neots to help in their care. All were trained at the hospital and are on the private staff of resident nurses who hold themselves available for emergencies, but in this case the hospital will not charge the parents for their services. One of the hospital's medical consultants also has visited St. Neots and consulted with Dr. Harrisson. An oxygen tent has been placed at the service of the babies by the British Red Cross Society in case of need.

== The family ==
Mrs Miles and her husband Walter lived at 13 Ferrars Avenue, Eynesbury and already had a 2-year-old son, Gordon. Walter Miles was a lorry driver, and Doris Miles was a homemaker. Mr Miles was 28 and worked at Rowlatt Brothers in St Neots; he said "I am no longer Walter Miles, lorry driver: I am the father of the St Neots quads."

Mr Miles said that he went to work as usual that day, but confessed to being a 'little late', and came home at lunchtime to find a huge group of reporters on his doorstep, and by 3 pm he said he had 'still not had a bite'."

== Post-natal care ==
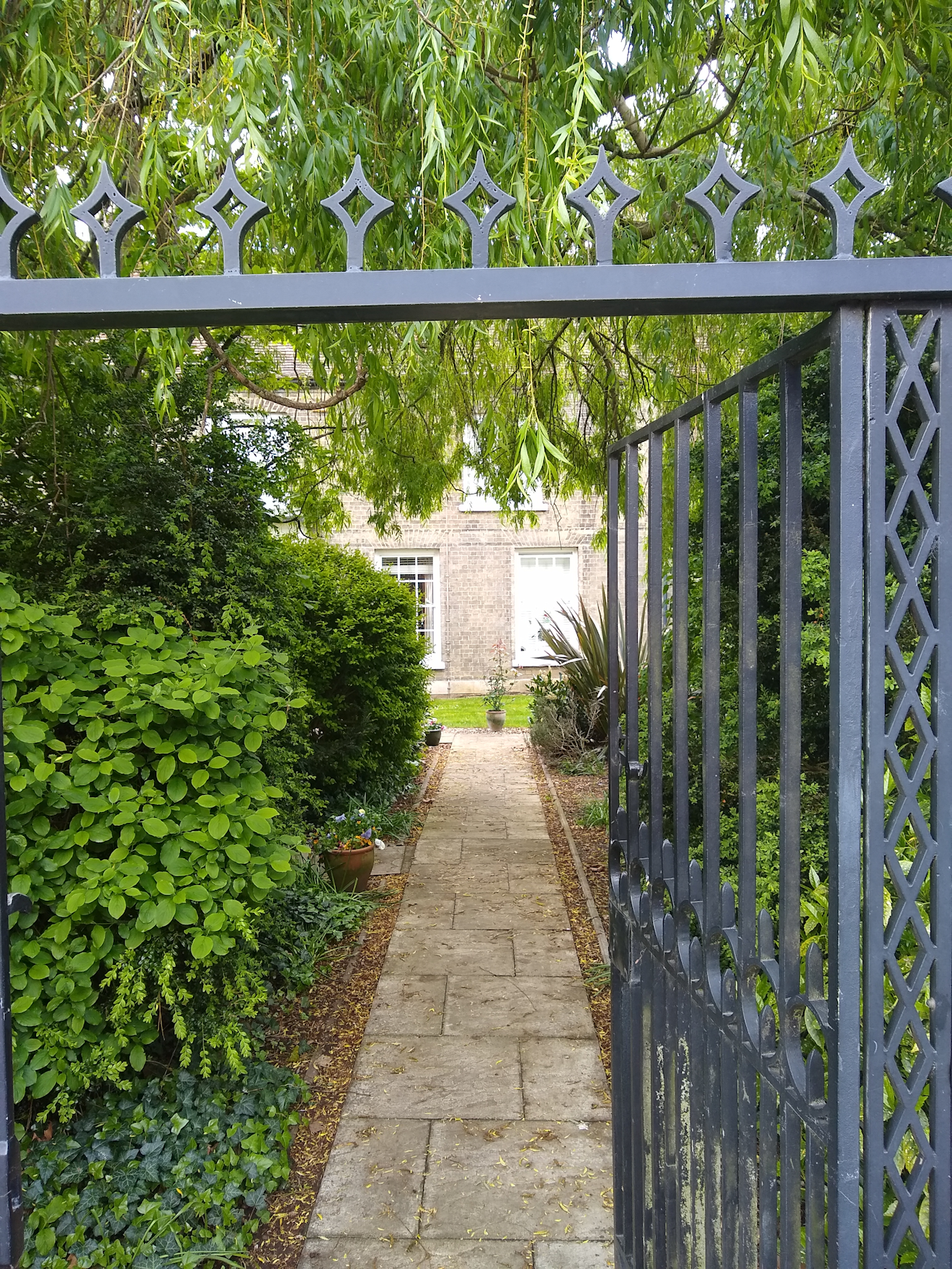
Dr Harrisson's house, the Shrubbery, in 2021

Medical knowledge about the care of premature babies was remarkably advanced in 1935, and it was quickly identified that specialist care would be essential. This could not be provided properly in the Miles home, and the quads were taken on 30 November to the home of Dr Ernest Harrisson at the Shrubbery in Church Street, St Neots. A dedicated nursery was provided there in a south-facing bedroom in Harrisson’s home.

It was necessary to keep them in a germ-free environment, with the temperature maintained at 78 deg F (26 deg C) and a humid atmosphere. A team of four nurses from Great Ormond Street Hospital attended to them, free of charge, (Note: The National Health Service had not yet come into existence.) to attend to their care. Milk was brought twice a day from Queen Charlotte's Hospital, London; it was skimmed and diluted with water to enable the babies to digest it. They were not bathed in water, but were rubbed with olive oil. The danger of infection meant that their parents were permitted only infrequent visits to their new babies.

The Times newspaper elaborated:

The quadruplets born to Mr. and Mrs. Miles at Eynesbury, Huntingdonshire, on Thursday, are being attended by four nurses from the Great Ormond Street Hospital, London. The babies are now lying in a specially heated room at Dr. Harrisson's house at St. Neot's, having been moved from their parents' home on Saturday. Dr. Harrisson explained that there had been a rush of people to see them at their home, and he thought it advisable to take them to his house, where also there was more convenience and better accommodation for the nurses. They were taken two at a time in the doctor's car. Dr. Harrisson said that the babies are costing about £15 a day, and he added, "Donations would be very acceptable, for the father is in poor circumstances." Human milk has to be brought by car from a London hospital at 10 a.m. and 6 p.m., the journeys totalling about 200 miles a day. "Any offer of help in fetching the milk would be gratefully received," said Dr. Harrisson.

== Childhood bronchitis ==
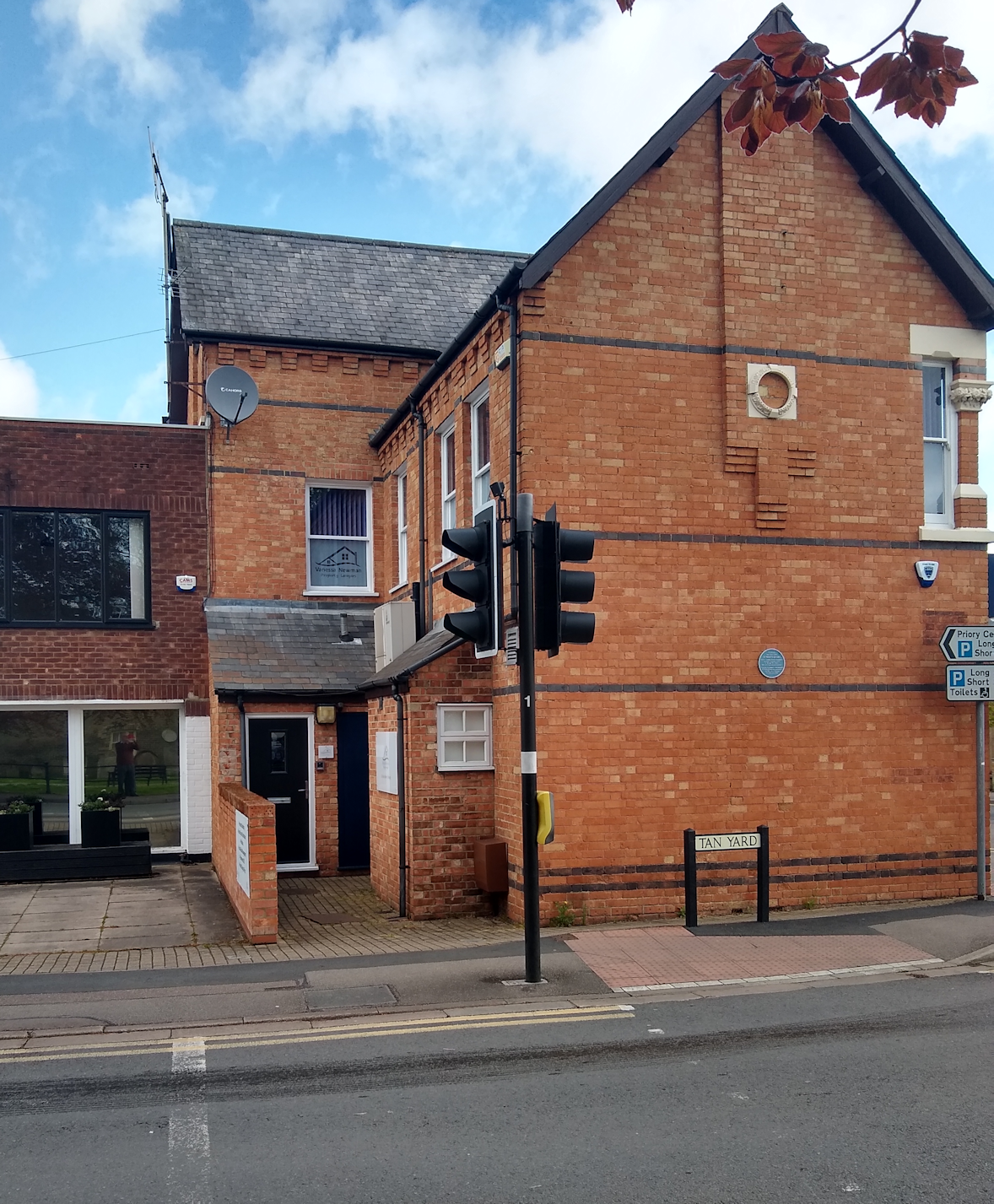
The house in New Street, St Neots showing the nursery extension for the quads

On 27 July 1939, the Times newspaper reported:

The St. Neots quads are all confined to bed. Paul and Ann developed bronchitis on Monday, the attack being severe, but not dangerous. Paul was much better yesterday, while Ann’s condition was about the same. Michael And Ernest have slight colds, and are being kept in bed as a matter of precaution. They are practically well again, but no visitors are allowed while they are in bed. The quads are now over 3½ years old.

== Fund raising ==
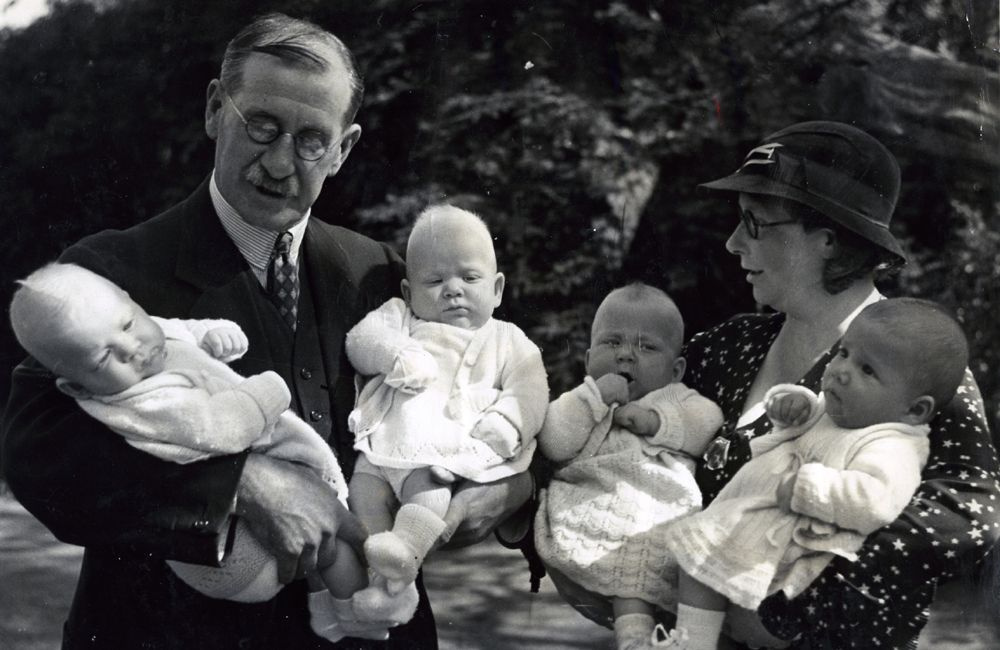
St Neots Quads in 1936 with Dr Harrisson and their Mother

Mr Miles' income at the time was £3 a week. Harrisson estimated that the care of the quads would be extremely expensive, amounting to about £5,000, and he started a public fund raising appeal. A limited contribution was available to the family in the form of a Royal Bounty, first established by Queen Victoria in 1849, for each child of a multiple birth "to enable the parents to meet sudden expenses thrown upon them". Mrs Miles received a bounty of £4 soon after the birth of the babies. A local newspaper, the St Neots Advertiser, started an appeal fund on 29 November, and donations came from local people and those who lived much further away.

The quads continued to thrive, and on 1 February 1936 they were given a first bath with soap and water. Their lives continued to be carefully regulated and their diets were monitored daily. Gradually they were able to digest ordinary breast milk and then moved on to unsweetened condensed milk with added sugar.

== Public events ==
St Bartholomew's Hospital in London held a children's fun event in July 1939. As well as funfair entertainments, and some gruesome medical exhibits, the St Neots Quads made an appearance on 5 July 1939.

When they were 21 years old, an event was staged in Grosvenor House in London at which they and three other sets of quadruplets took part. The other quads were 8, 8, and 6 years old respectively. Ann Miles cut an elaborate cake which her mother had baked. The event was portrayed in a Pathé newsreel as the Miles Quads' birthday party, but it was obviously a media stunt.

== Sponsorship and newsreel appearances ==
Soon after the birth, the babies moved to Cow & Gate 'Frailac', a formula milk, followed by Cow & Gate Half-cream Milk, and this began a longstanding connection with the Cow & Gate Company. The company supported the Miles Quads for many years, and when the family moved to a new home at 27 New Street, St Neots, (Note: The ground floor of the house is now a bookmaker's premises and the upper floors are occupied by a residential conveyancing practice.) Cow & Gate gave financial assistance toward making a nursery there, as well as providing baby milk and weaning foods, and giving them birthday presents. When they reached 21 years of age in 1956, in those days considered reaching adulthood, Cow & Gate paid for a grand 21st birthday party. The Quads appeared in many Cow & Gate advertising campaigns, and the income this provided helped Mr and Mrs Miles with the expense.

== Blue plaque ==
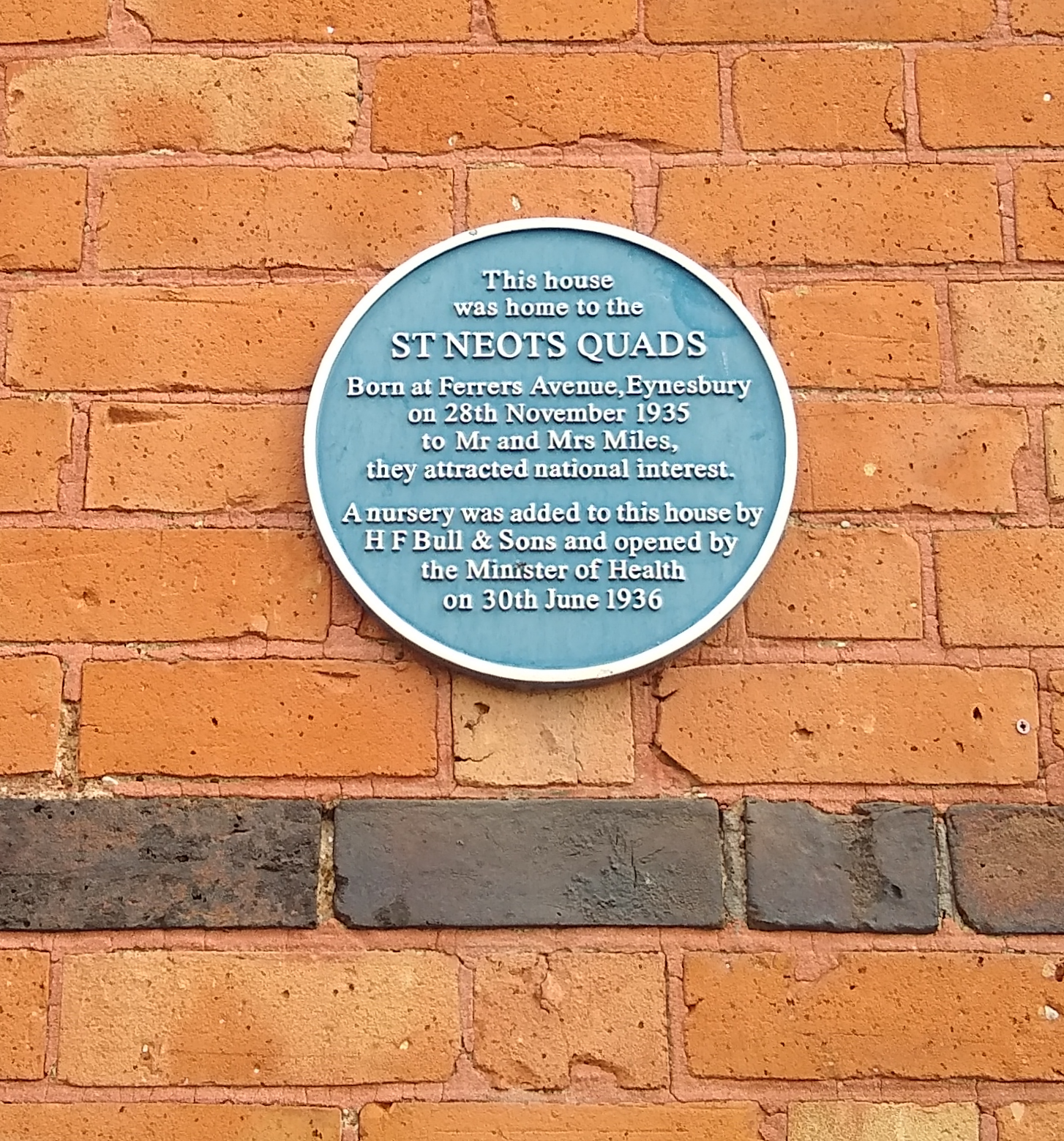
The blue plaque on the house at 27 New Street; "Ferrars" is incorrectly spelt

A blue plaque commemorating the birth of the quads has been fixed to the building at 27 New Street (in the Tan Yard elevation), stating "This house was home to the St Neots Quads. Born at Ferrers (sic) Avenue, Eynesbury on 28th November 1935 to Mr and Mrs Miles, they attracted national interest. A nursery was added to this house by H F Bull and sons and opened by the Minister of Health on 30th June 1936". On Wednesday 9 March three of the quads, Paul, Ernest and Ann, returned to unveil the blue plaque; Michael was unable to attend as he lives in South Africa.

== 79th birthday ==
The Mirror (newspaper) ran a headline on the 79th birthday in 2014, "Fourmidable: The world's oldest quads toast their 79th birthday against all the odds". Some information about their adult life was published in the article:

Ann moved to a nearby town and had three children with husband Bob Browning, later finding work as a school assistant. The three boys served stints in the Army and the RAF before going their separate ways. Dad-of-five Ernest worked at a power station and settled in Abingdon, Oxfordshire. Dad-of-three Paul started life as a boatbuilder but went on to work as an animal breeder near his home in Cambridgeshire. And dad-of-two Michael emigrated to South Africa where he worked for Kodak film. Between them, the quads now have 13 children, 23 grandchildren, and three great-grandchildren. Their father Walter died aged 64 while their Mother Doris passed away at the age of 74.

The St Neots quads are thought to be the oldest quads in the world.

Michael died on 20 September 2025, Paul on 29 September and Ann on Christmas Day that same year.

== Other multiple births ==
The St Neots Quads were the first quadruplets to survive in the United Kingdom, but two other surviving multiple births had taken place. The Dionne quintuplets, identical girls, had been born in Canada on 28 May 1934, and the Johnson quadruplets in New Zealand.
