= Rosemary Rees =

British aviator (1901–1994)

- Born: 23 September 1901; Brompton, London, England
- Died: 8 March 1994 (aged 92); Parkham, Devon
- Other names: Rosemary, Lady du Cros
- Occupation: pilot
- Employer: Air Transport Auxiliary
- Known for: One of the first women in the ATA
- Spouse: Philip Du Cros
- Parent: John Rees (civil servant)
- Relatives: Richard Rees

Rosemary Rees MBE (23 September 1901 – 8 March 1994) was a British aviator who worked for the Air Transport Auxiliary. She was second in command to Margot Gore at Hamble from the 29th September 1941 when the site became an all-women ATA ferry pool.

== Early life ==
Born Rosemary Theresa Rees to Sir John Rees and Mary Catherine Rees (née Dormer) on 23 September 1901 in Brompton, London. Her older brother Richard Rees (1900–1970) was a British diplomat, writer and painter.

Rees learned to dance through a ballet school in Chelsea. She then began dancing and performing in revue around the world including Ceylon, China and America.

== Flying ==
In the UK she took up flying and went solo after just seven hours instruction in 1933. Rees bought her own aeroplane. She visited European air-rallies with her Miles Hawk aircraft. She had over 600 hours before she joined the Air Transport Auxiliary and already had her instructors licence which she had achieved in 1938.

Rees joined the ATA on New Years Day 1940, one of the ATA's first eight female pilots alongside Joan Hughes, Margaret Cunnison, Mona Friedlander, Gabrielle Patterson, Marion Wilberforce, Margaret Fairweather, and Winifred Crossley Fair, under the command of Pauline Gower.

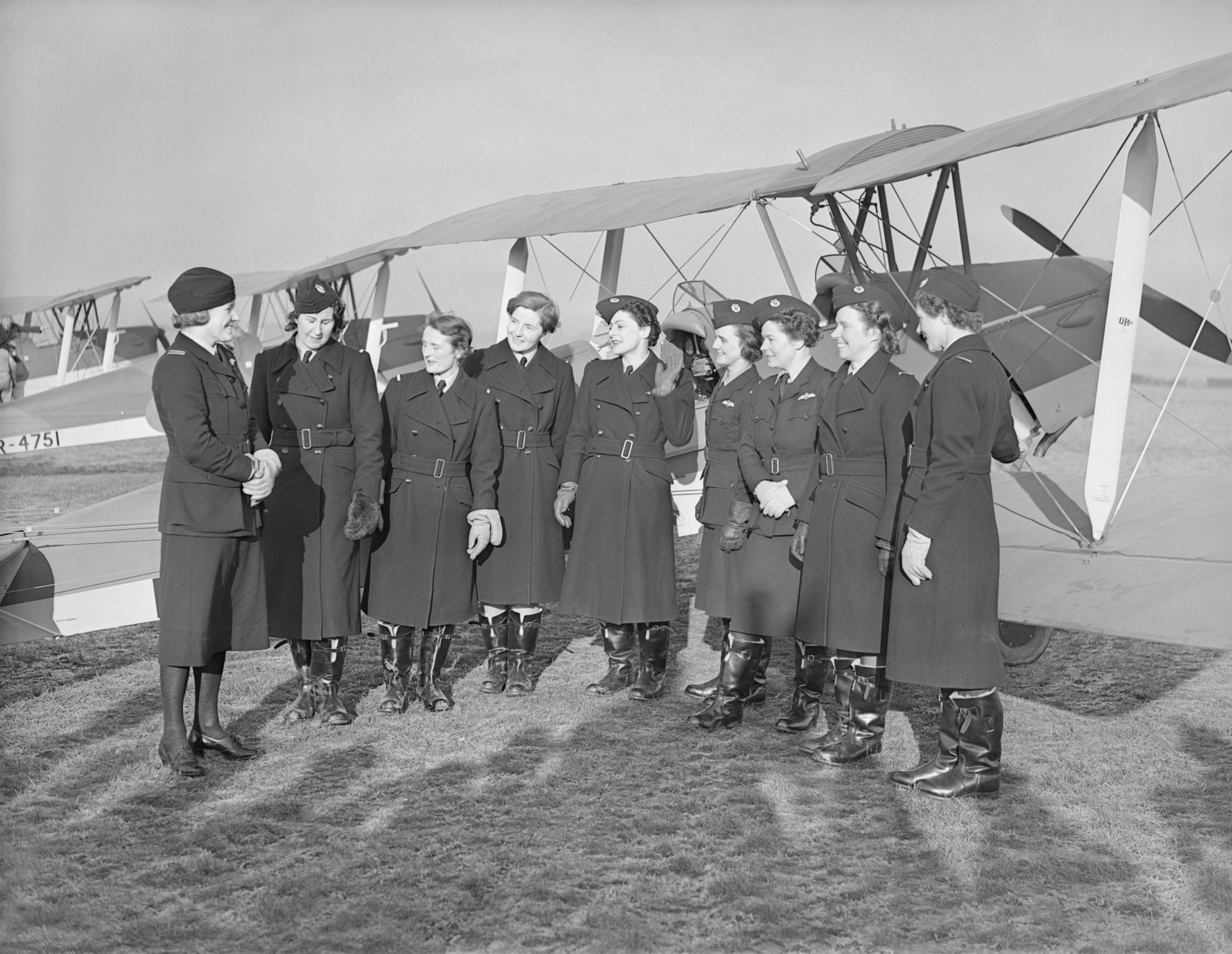
The Air Transport Auxiliary, 1939-1945. C389

In September 1941 she took on her role as deputy to Margot Gore at the all woman ferry pool at Hamble-on-Solent. She left the ATA in November 1945. By the end of the war she was one of only 11 women who had flown the 4-engine bombers and had flown 91 different aircraft types. In 1946 she started her own charter company called Sky Taxi.

Rees was one of the few ATA pilots that received a MBE.

== Life after flying ==
On 3 November 1950 she married Sir Philip Harvey Du Cros (1898–1975) becoming Rosemary, Lady du Cros. She moved to live with him in Parkham, Devon, where she became involved in politics, eventually becoming chairman of the Bideford area Conservative Association.

== Death ==
Rees died at Little Bocombe, Parkham, Devon, on 8 March 1994, aged ninety-two.

== Legacy ==
A bus company in Hatfield, Hertfordshire named its eight buses after the "first eight" of the Tiger Moth pilots in the ATA, including Rees.

Fourteen years after her death, in 2008 the fifteen surviving women members of the ATA (and 100 surviving male pilots) were given a special award by the Prime Minister Gordon Brown.

In December 2020, six pilot’s logbooks belonging to Rosemary Rees, were sold at auction for £7400, well above the expected estimate. The logbooks dated from June 25, 1933 to June 23, 1947, and were sold together with a leather flying helmet, leather gloves, two photograph albums, photographs of Rees as a dancer and related ephemera and books on flying.
