= Joan Hughes =

English test pilot (1918–1993)

Joan Hughes MBE
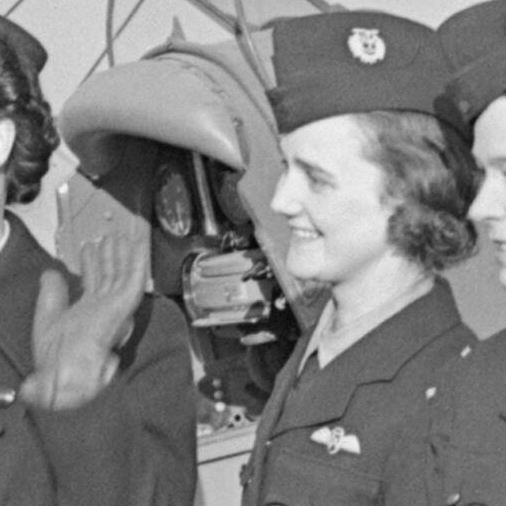
- Born: Joan Lily Amelia Hughes; 27 April 1918; West Ham, Essex, England
- Died: 16 August 1993 (aged 75); Somerset, England
- Occupation: Pilot
- Years active: 1933–1985

Joan Lily Amelia Hughes, MBE (27 April 1918 – 16 August 1993) was a World War II ferry pilot and one of Britain's first female test pilots. She was considered a capable instructor and flew everything except flying boats.

== Early life ==
Hughes was born in West Ham, Essex, in 1918. Her mother was Lily Amelia Leheup and her father Arthur Edward Hughes manufactured braids. She and her brother started flying training when she was fifteen and their parents paid the East Anglian Aero Club £2/10s an hour. At that time you could fly a plane at any age and so by 17 had she become the youngest qualified female pilot in Britain.

== Air Transport Auxiliary ==
As an experienced aviator, Hughes was one of the first eight female pilots (Note: The first eight women were Hughes, Margaret Cunnison, Mona Friedlander, Rosemary Rees, Marion Wilberforce, Margaret Fairweather, Gabrielle Patterson and Winifred Crossley Fair.) accepted into the Air Transport Auxiliary on 1 January 1940 and Hughes was the youngest female pilot to join the service.

Hughes initially flew Tiger Moths from Hatfield Aerodrome, Hertfordshire and soon Hughes had more than 600 hours' experience ferrying aircraft around the country. Though small in stature, she ferried all types of aircraft including heavy four-engined bombers such as the Short Stirling. She became both a senior pilot and the only woman qualified to instruct on all types of military aircraft then in service.

== Post war ==
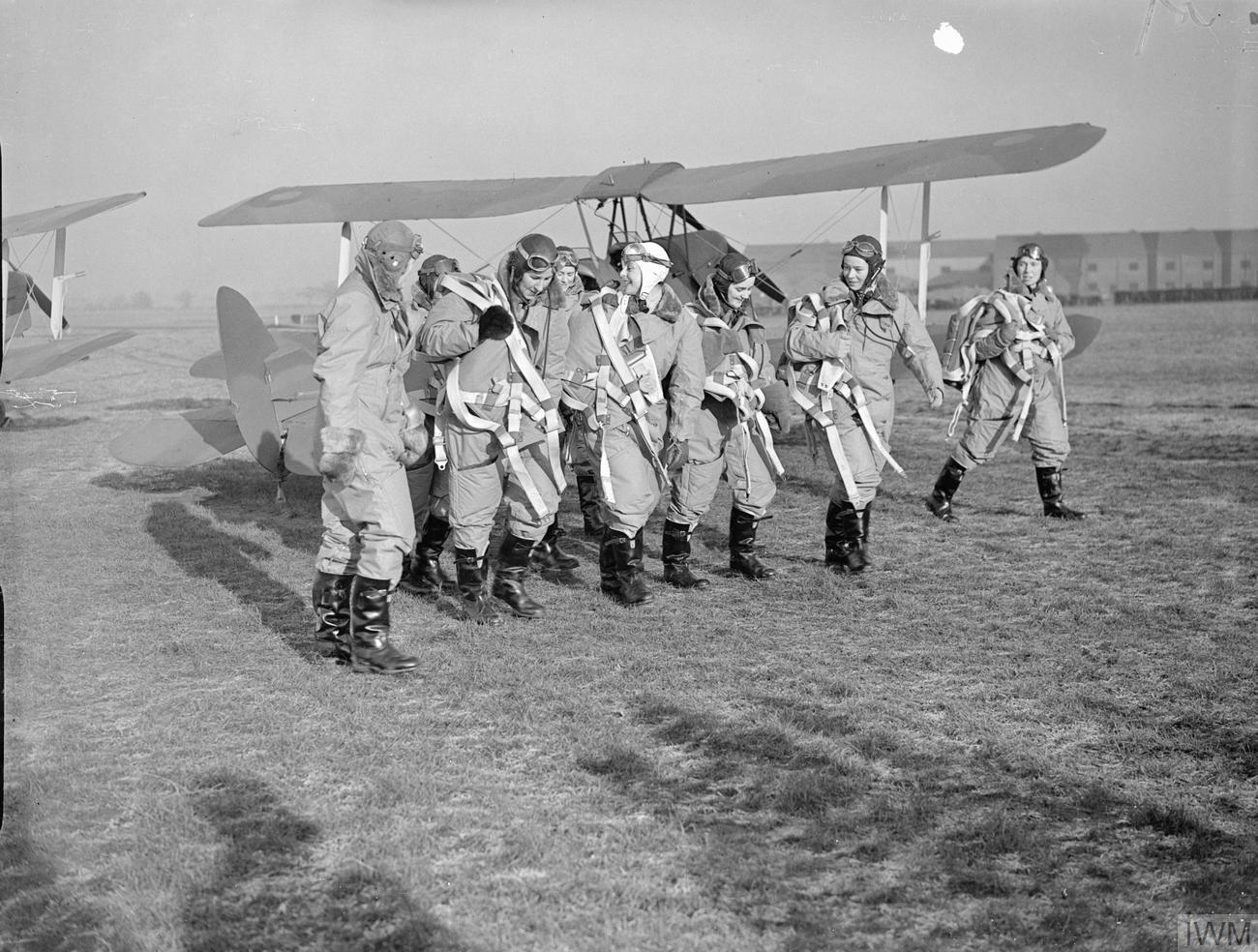
First eight women pilots in front of their De Havilland Tiger Moths (right to left): Pauline Gower (Commandant), Margaret Cunnison (obscured), Winifred Crossley, Hon.Margaret Fairweather, Mona Friedlander, Joan Hughes, Gabrielle Patterson and Rosemary Rees.

Hughes continued to fly after the war, using her talents as an instructor. She was featured in "The Eagle Special Investigator Meets Joan Mills in 'Special Investigator Flies Solo'" in the 1953 book Eagle Special Investigator. In the 1960s, Hughes served as a flying instructor with the Airways Aero Association, first at White Waltham Airfield, and then at Booker Airfield.

In early 1964, due to her low weight and considerable experience, Hughes was recruited for testing a near-replica of the 1909 Santos-Dumont Demoiselle monoplane, ultimately flying it for the shooting of the 1965 film Those Magnificent Men in Their Flying Machines. She also flew replica World War I aircraft for the film The Blue Max (1966) and a Tiger Moth bi-plane for the live-action flying shots in Thunderbird 6 (1968). In the latter film she ended up in court as it was alleged that she had flown under a motorway bridge in a dangerous manner. The case was abandoned after they heard that she had flown, rather than taxied under, the bridge because this was the safest choice.

During the 20 June 1966 episode of To Tell The Truth television panel show, Hughes appeared as herself; two of the four panelists correctly picked her as the contestant.

In 1984, Hughes was interviewed about her life and flying career as part of the Imperial War Museum's oral history project.

She retired at Booker Airfield in 1985, after spending over 10,000 hours instructing other pilots making up 11,800 flight hours in her logbook.

== Honours ==
Hughes was appointed a Member of the Order of the British Empire (MBE) in 1946 for her war work. In 1980 Hughes was awarded the Pike Trophy by the Honourable Company of Air Pilots, the prize is given to an individual who has made an outstanding contribution to civil flying instruction.

== Later life ==
Hughes died of cancer in Taunton on 16 August 1993, aged 75.

== Posthumous recognition ==
A bus company in Hatfield named its eight buses after the "first eight" of the Tiger Moth pilots in the ATA, including Hughes.

In 2008, the fifteen surviving women members of the ATA (and 100 surviving male pilots) were given a special award by the Prime Minister Gordon Brown.

Hughes' MBE medal was sold by Chilcotts Auctioneers in Honiton in December 2020 for £5800, alongside her Pike Trophy medal and a related scrapbook, considerably higher than its expected price.
