= Margaret Cunnison =

Scottish aviator and flying instructor

- Born: 29 May 1914; Haddington
- Died: 4 January 2004 (aged 89); Haddington
- Other names: Margaret Ebbage
- Occupation: pilot

Margaret Cunnison (29 May 1914 – 4 January 2004) was a Scottish aviator and the first Scottish woman flying instructor. She was one of the first women to join the Air Transport Auxiliary.

== Life ==
Margaret Cunnison was born in Bourneville, Birmingham in 1914. Her family was originally from Blairgowrie, in Perthshire. Her father, James Cunnison, was then lecturer in economics at the Working Men's Residential College in Bourneville - founded in 1909 by George Cadbury, and still operating today - and later at the University of Glasgow. Margaret was educated at Laurel Bank School in Glasgow.

In 1933 Cunnison entered a competition to win an "air scholarship" with the Evening News and won lessons with the Scottish Flying Club. She got her A Licence in Scotland then travelled to Lympne, Kent, to get her B licence, and gained the second Scottish woman's commercial pilot's licence.

She was already an instructor before the war and worked as an instructor with the Strathtay Aero Club.

== Air Transport Auxiliary ==
Cunnison joined the Air Transport Auxiliary (ATA) with the other initial 7 women in 1940. Together with Joan Hughes, Mona Friedlander, Rosemary Rees, Marion Wilberforce, Margaret Fairweather, Gabrielle Patterson and Winifred Crossley Fair they were known as the First Eight, and appointed by the Commandant of the ATA's women's section, Pauline Gower. Cunnison was the leading instructor at Hatfield Aerodrome responsible for evaluating and training the new pilots.

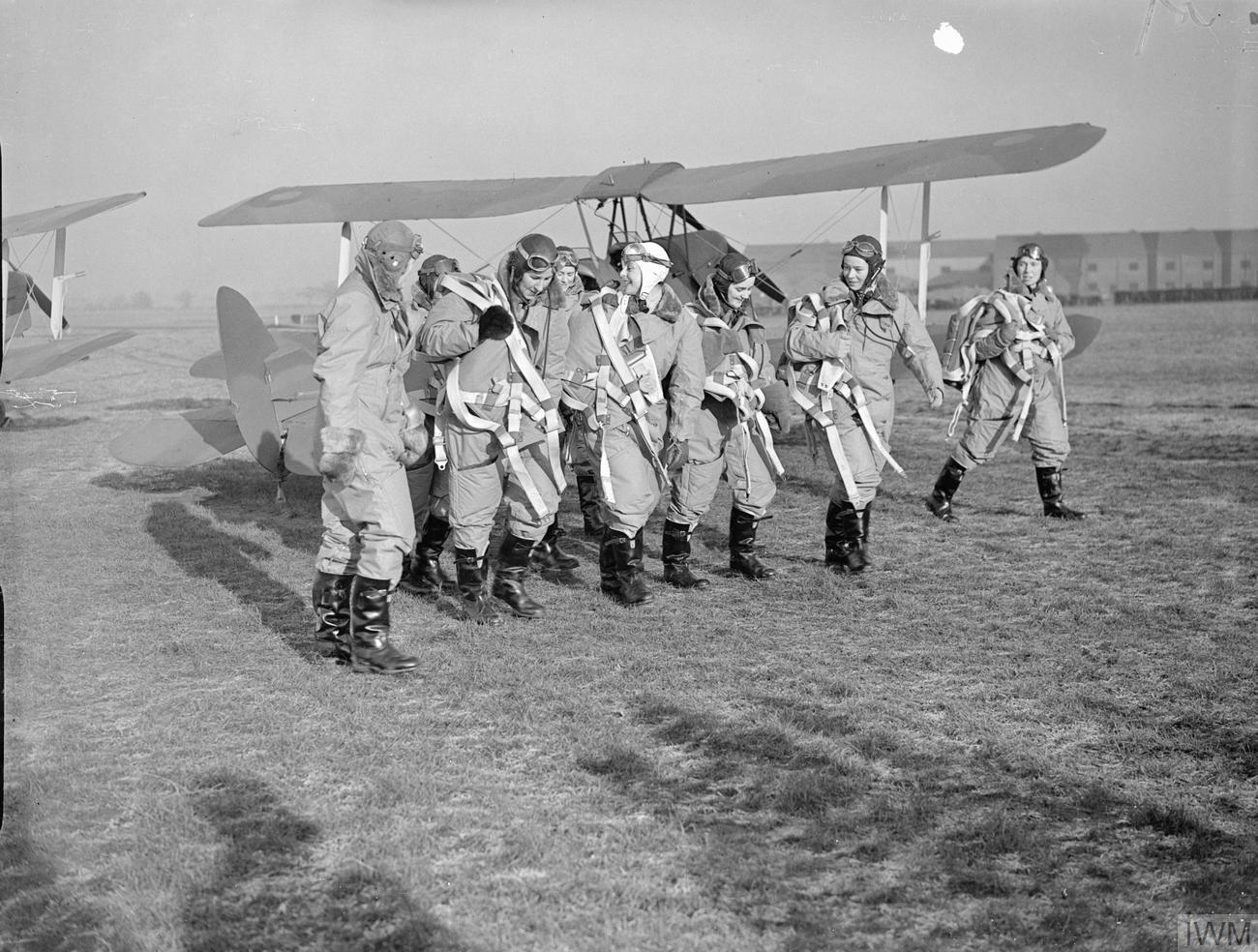
First eight women ATA pilots IWM-C382 ATA 205211860

She signed off on the American women pilots at Luton. As a result of her role, Cunnison mostly flew light aircraft.

She left the ATA to get married in 1943 to Geoffrey Ebbage, an ophthalmic surgeon with the RAMC. They lived in London and had a son. Cunnison died in Haddington in 2004.

== Legacy ==
A bus company in Hatfield named its eight buses after the "first eight" of the Tiger Moth pilots in the ATA, including Cunnison.

In 2008, four years after her death, the fifteen surviving women members of the ATA (and 100 surviving male pilots) were given a special award by the Prime Minister Gordon Brown.
