= Marion Wilberforce =

Scottish aviator (1902-1995)

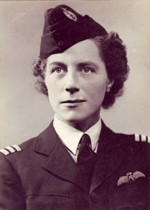
- Marion Wilberforce in Air Transport Auxiliary uniform during WW2
- Born: Marion Ogilvie Forbes; 22 July 1902; Aberdeen, Scotland
- Died: 17 December 1995 (aged 93)
- Education: Somerville College, Oxford
- Occupation: Aviator
- Spouse(s): Robert Wilberforce (30 October 1905 – 17 December 1984)
- Parent(s): Anne Ogilvie Forbes; John Ogilvie-Forbes, the 9th Laird of Boyndlie
- Relatives: Neill Ogilvie-Forbes

Marion Wilberforce (22 July 1902 – 17 December 1995) was a Scottish aviator and one of the first eight members of the Air Transport Auxiliary (ATA). She flew many planes including Spitfires, Hurricanes, Lancaster Bombers, Wellington Bombers and Mosquitos. She rose to become deputy commander of the No. 5 Ferry Pool at Hatfield, and later became commander of the No. 12 Ferry Pool at Cosford, one of only two women pool commanders in the whole ATA.

== Early life ==
She was born on 22 July 1902 to Anne Ogilvie Forbes (née Prendergast) and John Ogilvie-Forbes, the 9th Laird of Boyndlie, she was one of seven children. At the age of 12 her father ceased to take an interest in the running of the house and estate, entrusting her with its management, two years later she would be seen riding round on horseback to collect the rent from the tenants.

After a series of French governesses at home she went to the Convent of Jesus and Mary at Stony Stratford in Bucks from 1919 to 1921. In 1922 she went up to Somerville College Oxford to read for a degree in agriculture which in due course she obtained. Many years later she gave her books to Reading University library, assuming that what she had learnt was then contained in museum pieces. While there she acted in the French Club on one occasion performing the role of chambermaid in Les Deux Pierrots, and was a member of the university's Women's Mountaineering Team. She also obtained a certificate of merit in jiu-jitsu.

== Prewar flying ==
With two brothers in aviation she caught the bug of flying, and saved up to learn to fly by working on an outdoors magazine in Bedford Square. She obtained her private pilot's licence in 1930. She bought her first aircraft, a de Havilland Cirrus Moth, in 1937 from money made on the stock exchange as a child, having been taught how to invest on it by her uncle Reginald Prendergast. She graduated from this to a Hornet Moth.

For tax purposes these aircraft were classified as farm implements and kept in a barn. They were used to ferry poultry about in, as well as Dexter cattle which she bred at Nevendon Manor in Essex precisely because they would fit into the aeroplanes. On one occasion she flew a calf back from Hungary. By the outbreak of the Second World War she has 900 flying hours in her logbook.

== Air Transport Auxiliary ==
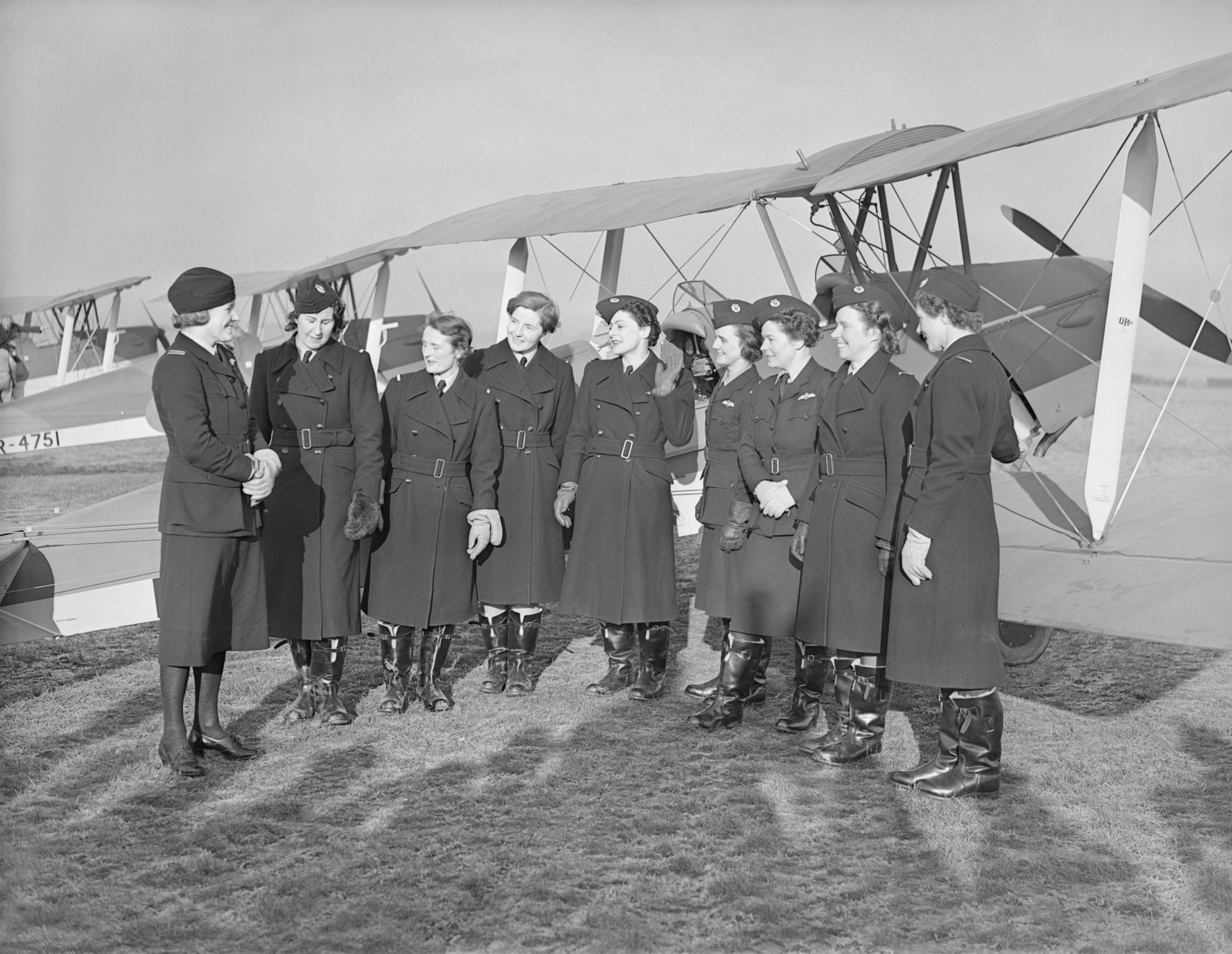
The founding ATA pilots and their Tiger Moths: left to right Pauline Gower, Winifred Crossley Fair, Margaret Cunnison, Hon. Margaret Fairweather, Mona Friedlander, Joan Hughes, Gabrielle Patterson, Rosemary Rees and Marion Wilberforce.

On 16 December 1939, the first group of twelve women pilots were assembled at Whitchurch, and flight-tested in a Gypsy Moth. From this group of twelve, eight were selected and appointed as second officers. Marion Wilberforce was one of these, known as the First Eight alongside Joan Hughes, Margaret Cunnison, Winifred Crossley Fair, Mona Friedlander, Gabrielle Patterson, Margaret Fairweather and Rosemary Rees, under the command of Pauline Gower. These women were tasked with the hazardous job of ferrying all types of aircraft from factories to aircraft storage units and despatch points, and on to operational stations. When she joined the ATA she had flown 900 hours. By March 1943 she had flown one thousand and eight hundred hours more.

She was first deputy and then commanding officer of the inaugural women's Ferry Pool at Hatfield, and in 1943 became commander of the No 12 Ferry Pool at Cosford, one of only two women pool commanders in the whole ATA.

On one occasion she arrived at a factory to discover that the employees were on strike and that the aircraft that she had been sent to collect could not be released. She went to the canteen, stood on a table and gave a resounding speech about the war effort. This secured the release of her aircraft.

One of her colleagues was Amy Johnson, the woman aviator who drowned in the Thames whilst on a mission. Marion Wilberforce, who knew her well, was often asked for recollections of her, which irritated her since she considered her to be overrated and a poor flyer prone to panic. She did not say this in public.

Initially, the ATA women flew the non operational aircraft with which they were most familiar, but by mid-1941 Marion Wilberforce was flying operational machines including Hurricanes and Spitfires which she piloted as a matter of course. The first Spitfire she flew was donated by the citizens of Grimsby and accordingly called Grimsby II. During 1942 she mastered the whole gamut of twin-engined medium bombers including the Wellington and Mosquito. Two years later she became one of only eleven women pilots trained to fly four-engined bombers such as the Lancaster. By the end of the War she had flown most of the one hundred and thirty aircraft flown by members of the ATA. In the early days she also had to fly civilian aircraft that had been impressed, including her own Hornet Moth which was later lost on a reconnaissance flight.

Aircraft piloted by her ended up in South Africa, North East India, Ceylon, the Middle East and Russia. They were otherwise variously used for the invasion of Madagascar, for bomber crew training, anti-submarine duties, air sea rescue and the spectacular attack on the Gestapo Headquarters in Oslo in 1942. On 27 October 1944 she delivered to Armstrong Whitworth at Baginton a particularly interesting Lancaster which was to be fitted with the company's first axial flow turbojet. This was the forerunner of the modern day jet fighter. On some days she would ferry as many as four different aircraft, hopping from one aerodrome to another, and in the second half of 1944 alone she effected 114 deliveries.

At the cessation of hostilities she flew to Europe with the ATA Air Movements flight, going as far afield as Pilsen in Czechoslovakia.

== Postwar flying ==
Disliking the noise, she refused to install a radio in her aeroplane until required to by the law, and on one occasion as a result disrupted a NATO exercise. If she wanted to land she would circle the airfield waving her wings and wait for someone to step onto the airstrip showing a flag indicating that she could do so. Her navigation used to involve following features on the ground. If she was lost she would land in the middle of nowhere to ask for directions or to read a signpost by a road. Fields were often her airstrips. On one occasion she landed close to a farmer raking his hay. "You can't land there" he politely pointed out. "But I already have done I'm afraid", she replied before asking the way.

She always carried a dinghy in her aeroplane in case she came down over water.

In 1949 she decided to visit her brother Neill, who was air attaché in the embassy in Moscow, and to take advantage of his posting there. She flew as far east as she could, to Helsinki, and continued her journey onwards piloted in another plane, or possibly by train. Once there she made a confounded nuisance of herself ignoring all the restrictions on movement by foreigners exploring wherever she liked. When confronted by Russian police or military she would pretend not to understand the regulations on account of the language barrier. On one occasion she discovered a car with a spare ration of petrol and vanished with it. She brought back with her some blue soap, relishing the colour in drab postwar Britain.

She would regularly fly around Britain and Ireland visiting friends and go off to the Continent. When feeling bored she would take off from Essex for lunch in Luxembourg, or opera in Vienna. On one occasion in 1953 she strayed out of Austrian and into Russian airspace, only to find herself being shot at.

When she was eighty she decided that the time had come to give up flying. In civilian life she flew Hornet Moths, of which only thirty were made. They were similar in size to the Tiger Moth but were built completely of wood and had the then luxury of leather seats and a fully enclosed cabin with two seats side by side, rather than in tandem as was the Tiger Moth. Her second she bought from a butcher in Aberdeen, and when she stopped flying it was sold to an Australian sheep farmer.

In peacetime she was best known in aviation as someone who did was she was not meant to do, whether it was skirting the ground at two hundred feet to avoid radar when on a route she shouldn't have been on, or disrupting that NATO exercise.

== Personal life ==
In 1932 she married Robert Wilberforce, a descendant of William Wilberforce (the British abolitionist), though this was not always definite. Her husband-to-be was for some time undecided between the state of matrimony and a vocation to the priesthood, eventually deciding to test the strength of the latter by spending six months in the monastery at Ampleforth Abbey. When this period was over Marion was at the monastery gates to collect him. They lived at Nevendon Manor in Wickford, Essex where they farmed poultry, Dexter cattle and pigs and she would regularly ferry the poultry and cattle around in her plane as far as Hungary.

She was a modest woman, refusing requests for interviews about her wartime exploits. She was invited to stand for Parliament but declined. She declined an MBE at the end of the war.

Fairbridge Charity

From 1929 she took interest in the work of the Fairbridge Charity, whose aim was to rehome orphaned children from overcrowded British cities into agricultural communities. The charity's work was of great interest to her as it incorporated two causes that were important to her; agriculture and children (the latter was especially personal to Wilberforce as she was unable to have her own children.).

In the late 1920s and early 1930s she visited Canada and Australia to look over farm schools there. She continued to be involved in the Fairbridge Farm Schools until late in her life. Having no children herself, she often had Fairbridge children to stay with her for extended periods.

== Commemoration ==
A blue plaque was unveiled at Nevendon Manor in Marion Wilberforce's honour on 9 August 2023 as part of the Essex Women’s Commemoration Project.

== See also ==
- Air Transport Auxiliary
