= Margaret Fairweather =

British aviator (1901–1944)

The Honourable Margaret Fairweather
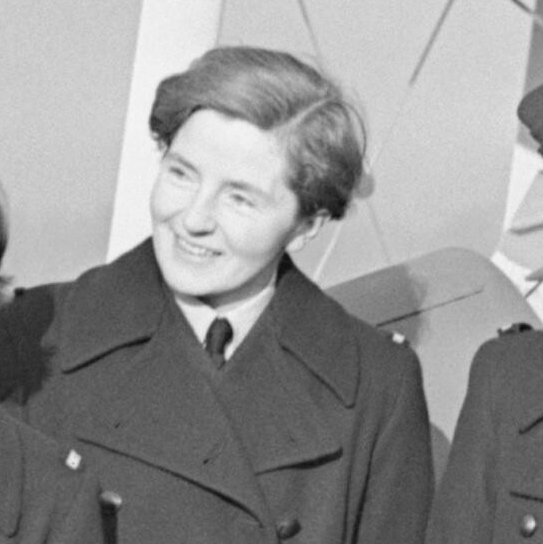
- One of the first eight
- Born: Margaret Runciman; 23 September 1901; West Denton Hall, near Newcastle upon Tyne
- Died: 4 August 1944 (aged 42); Malpas, Cheshire
- Cause of death: Extensive skull fracture caused by plane crash
- Resting place: Dunure Cemetery
- Monuments: She and her husband are both noted on a rare double CWGC headstone.
- Education: Girton College, Cambridge
- Occupation: Aviator
- Spouses: Roderick Sydney Nettleton King-Farlow (m. 1925–1936) Douglas Fairweather (m. 1938)
- Children: Elizabeth Fairweather
- Parents: Walter Runciman, 1st Viscount Runciman of Doxford; Hilda Stevenson

Margaret Fairweather (23 September 1901 – 4 August 1944) was a British aviator and one of the first eight women members of the Air Transport Auxiliary (ATA). She was the first woman to fly a Supermarine Spitfire.

== Life ==
Fairweather was born in 1901 in the West Denton part of Newcastle upon Tyne. Her mother, Hilda Runciman, Viscountess Runciman of Doxford and her father Walter Runciman, 1st Viscount Runciman of Doxford were both members of parliament. She was educated at Notting Hill High School for Girls

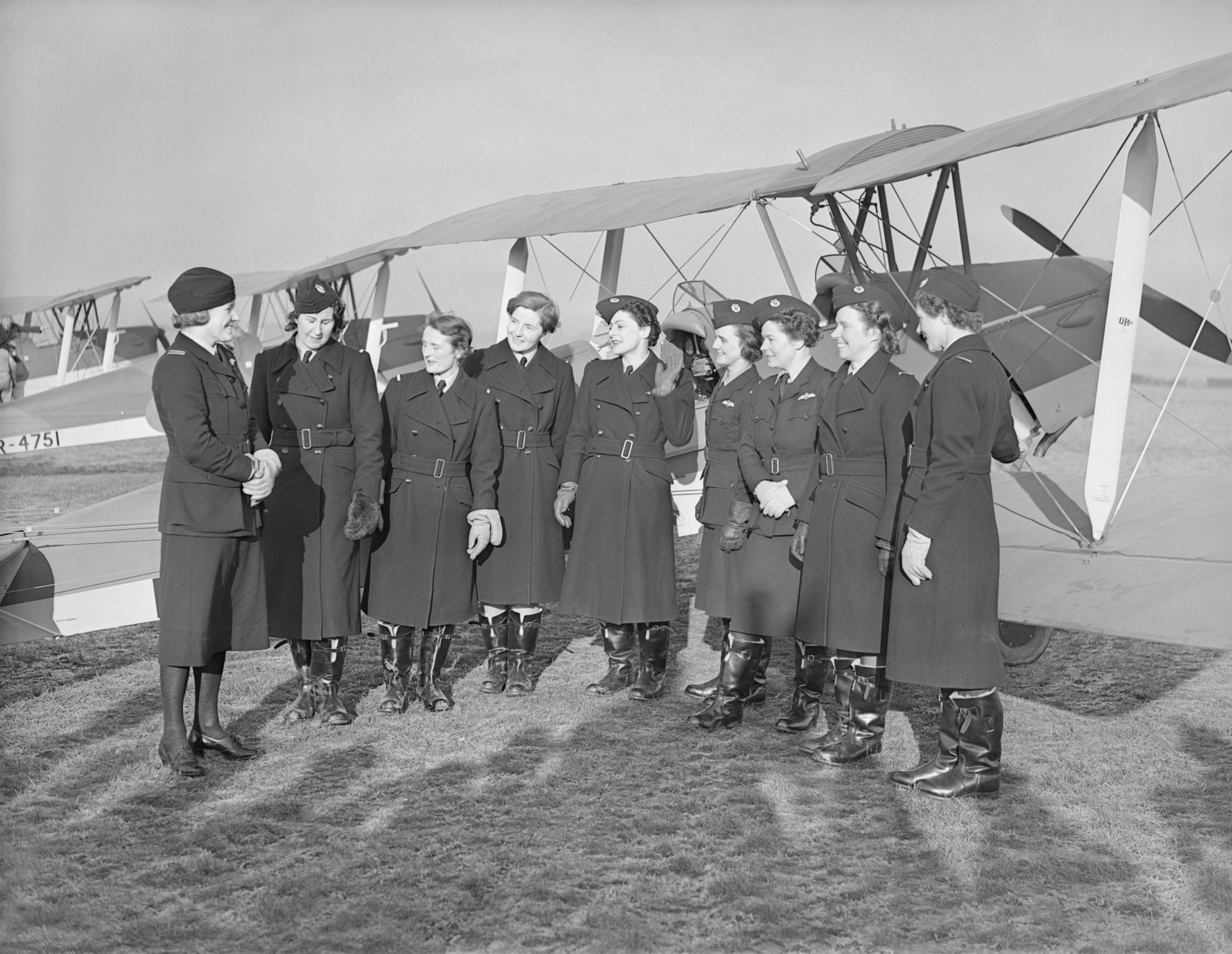
The founding ATA pilots and their Tiger Moths: left to right Pauline Gower, Winifred Crossley Fair, Margaret Cunnison, Margaret Fairweather, Mona Friedlander, Joan Hughes, Gabrielle Patterson, Rosemary Rees and Marion Wilberforce

She was an instructor for the Civil Air Guard at Renfrew.

== Air Transport Auxiliary ==
After war was declared in 1939, she was one of the first eight women members of the Air Transport Auxiliary (ATA). She was known as one of the First Eight, alongside Joan Hughes, Margaret Cunnison, Winifred Crossley Fair, Mona Friedlander, Gabrielle Patterson, Marion Wilberforce, and Rosemary Rees, under the command of Pauline Gower. She flew many planes including Tiger Moths and Hurricanes, and was the first woman to fly a Supermarine Spitfire.

Shortly after the death of her husband, Douglas, piloting an ATA aircraft on 3 April 1944, she died in a crash on 4 August that same year; also on board was her sister Kitty who was injured. The original cause of the aborted mission was a mechanical problem with the fuel tank. Because of the lack of fuel Margaret was obliged to make a forced landing at Hawarden in Cheshire which went well until they hit a ditch and she lost control as the Percival Proctor flipped over. She had the worst injuries and despite being rushed to a hospital she died the next day. She had only just returned to work after giving birth. She and her husband are the only ATA couple to share the same grave and headstone. They are buried at Dunure cemetery in Ayrshire.

== Legacy ==
A bus company in Hatfield named its eight buses after the "first eight" of the Tiger Moth pilots in the ATA, including Fairweather. The fifteen surviving women members of the ATA (and 100 surviving male pilots) were given a special award in 2008 by the Prime Minister Gordon Brown.
