= 1857 Manchester City Council election =

Local election in Manchester

- 2 November 1857

16 of 64 seats to Manchester City Council 33 seats needed for a majority

Elections to Manchester City Council were held on Monday, 2 November 1857. One third of the councillors seats were up for election, with each successful candidate to serve a three-year term of office.

== Ward results ==
=== All Saints' ===
All Saints'
Party	Candidate	Votes	%	±%
	John Fildes*	uncontested		
		Swing		

=== Ardwick ===
Ardwick
Party	Candidate	Votes	%	±%
Conservative	John Marsland Bennett*	uncontested		
Conservative hold		Swing		

=== Cheetham ===
Cheetham
Party	Candidate	Votes	%	±%
Liberal	Harry Rawson*	393	57.3	+4.8
Conservative	John Johnson	293	42.7	−4.8
Majority		100	14.6	+9.6
Turnout		686		
Liberal hold		Swing		

=== Collegiate Church ===
Collegiate Church
Party	Candidate	Votes	%	±%
Liberal	John Leigh	500	51.1	+0.2
Conservative	Peter Royle	478	48.9	−0.2
Majority		22	2.2	+0.4
Turnout		978		
Liberal hold		Swing		

=== Exchange ===
Exchange
Party	Candidate	Votes	%	±%
	James Woolley*	uncontested		
		Swing		

=== Medlock Street ===
Medlock Street
Party	Candidate	Votes	%	±%
Liberal	Edward Salmon Green	uncontested		
Liberal gain from		Swing		

=== New Cross ===
New Cross
Party	Candidate	Votes	%	±%
Conservative	Adam Woodward	309	52.9	N/A
Conservative	John Howard*	260	44.5	N/A
Liberal	Richard Higham	217	37.2	N/A
Independent	Henry Fletcher	82	14.0	N/A
Majority		43	8.3	N/A
Turnout		584		
Conservative gain from Liberal		Swing		
Conservative hold		Swing		

=== Oxford ===
Oxford
Party	Candidate	Votes	%	±%
	Thomas Beatt Sharp*	uncontested		
		Swing		

=== St. Ann's ===
St. Ann's
Party	Candidate	Votes	%	±%
Liberal	Samuel Fletcher*	uncontested		
Liberal hold		Swing		

=== St. Clement's ===
St. Clement's
Party	Candidate	Votes	%	±%
Conservative	Matthew Curtis*	uncontested		
Conservative hold		Swing		

=== St. George's ===
St. George's
Party	Candidate	Votes	%	±%
	Thomas Dilworth Crewdson*	uncontested		
		Swing		

=== St. James' ===
St. James'
Party	Candidate	Votes	%	±%
Conservative	John Grave*	268	66.5	N/A
Conservative	James Collinge	135	33.5	N/A
Majority		133	33.0	N/A
Turnout		403		
Conservative hold		Swing		

=== St. John's ===
St. John's
Party	Candidate	Votes	%	±%
	Joseph Nall*	uncontested		
		Swing		

=== St. Luke's ===
St. Luke's
Party	Candidate	Votes	%	±%
Liberal	Walter Clarke*	uncontested		
Liberal hold		Swing		

=== St. Michael's ===
St. Michael's
Party	Candidate	Votes	%	±%
Liberal	Thomas Worthington*	uncontested		
Liberal hold		Swing		
