= 1860 Manchester City Council election =

Local election in Manchester

- 1 November 1860

16 of 64 seats to Manchester City Council 33 seats needed for a majority

Elections to Manchester City Council were held on Thursday, 1 November 1860. One third of the councillors seats were up for election, with each successful candidate to serve a three-year term of office.

== Ward results ==
=== All Saints' ===
All Saints'
Party	Candidate	Votes	%	±%
Conservative	Thomas Clowes	576	57.4	N/A
Liberal	Charles Thompson	428	42.6	N/A
Majority		148	14.8	N/A
Turnout		1,004		
Conservative gain from		Swing		

=== Ardwick ===
Ardwick
Party	Candidate	Votes	%	±%
Liberal	Robert Rumney*	562	51.8	+4.7
Conservative	Isaac Phillipson	522	48.2	−4.7
Majority		40	3.6	
Turnout		1,084		
Liberal hold		Swing		

=== Cheetham ===
Cheetham
Party	Candidate	Votes	%	±%
Liberal	Harry Rawson*	10	90.9	N/A
Independent	Henry Fletcher	1	9.1	N/A
Majority		9	81.8	N/A
Turnout		11		
Liberal hold		Swing		

=== Collegiate Church ===
Collegiate Church
Party	Candidate	Votes	%	±%
Liberal	John Porteus	480	57.0	N/A
Conservative	George Anderton	362	43.0	N/A
Majority		118	14.0	N/A
Turnout		842		
Liberal hold		Swing		

=== Exchange ===
Exchange
Party	Candidate	Votes	%	±%
Liberal	Thomas Warburton	300	65.9	N/A
Liberal	Thomas Brittain*	155	34.1	N/A
Independent	Henry Fletcher	0	0.0	N/A
Majority		145	31.8	N/A
Turnout		455		
Liberal gain from Liberal		Swing		

=== Medlock Street ===
Medlock Street
Party	Candidate	Votes	%	±%
	Joseph Eltoft	910	58.5	
Ratepayers	Abraham Dearden	645	41.5	N/A
Majority		265	17.0	
Turnout		1,555		
gain from Liberal		Swing		

=== New Cross ===
New Cross
Party	Candidate	Votes	%	±%
Liberal	Edwin Butterworth	375	57.8	N/A
Conservative	Adam Woodward*	336	51.8	N/A
Conservative	John Howard*	211	32.5	N/A
Independent	Henry Fletcher	0	0.0	N/A
Majority		125	19.3	N/A
Turnout		649		
Liberal gain from Conservative		Swing		
Conservative hold		Swing		

=== Oxford ===
Oxford
Party	Candidate	Votes	%	±%
Liberal	Henry Patteson	uncontested		
Independent	Henry Fletcher	no votes		
Liberal gain from		Swing		

=== St. Ann's ===
St. Ann's
Party	Candidate	Votes	%	±%
Liberal	Thomas Baker	10	100.0	
Independent	Henry Fletcher	0	0.0	N/A
Majority		10	100.0	
Turnout		10		
Liberal hold		Swing		

=== St. Clement's ===
St. Clement's
Party	Candidate	Votes	%	±%
Conservative	Matthew Curtis*	5	100.0	+49.9
Independent	Henry Fletcher	0	0.0	N/A
Majority		5	100.0	+99.8
Turnout		5		
Conservative hold		Swing		

=== St. George's ===
St. George's
Party	Candidate	Votes	%	±%
	Thomas Dilworth Crewdson*	31	81.6	N/A
Independent	Henry Fletcher	7	18.4	N/A
Majority		24	63.2	N/A
Turnout		38		
		Swing		

=== St. James' ===
St. James'
Party	Candidate	Votes	%	±%
Conservative	John Grave*	uncontested		
Conservative hold		Swing		

=== St. John's ===
St. John's
Party	Candidate	Votes	%	±%
	Joseph Marsden	15	100.0	N/A
Independent	Henry Fletcher	0	0.0	N/A
Majority		15	100.0	N/A
Turnout		15		
		Swing		

=== St. Luke's ===
St. Luke's
Party	Candidate	Votes	%	±%
	Henry Walker*	uncontested		
		Swing		

=== St. Michael's ===
St. Michael's
Party	Candidate	Votes	%	±%
Conservative	Gregory Allcock	52	92.9	N/A
	John Armstrong	4	7.1	N/A
Independent	Henry Fletcher	0	0.0	N/A
Majority		48	85.8	N/A
Turnout		56		
Conservative gain from Liberal		Swing		
