= Spotter =

A spotter is someone trained to look for something.

Spotter may refer to:

== Sports ==
- Spotter (auto racing), a type of navigator in auto racing
- Spotter (weight training), someone who assists someone lifting a weight in order to prevent injuries
- Spotting (climbing), a person who stands below a climber for accident prevention

== Military or policing ==
- Spotter (sniping), member of a sniper team who assists in observation of targets and handles ancillary tasks
- Spotter plane, an aircraft used for surveillance
- Artillery observer or spotter, a person who is responsible for directing artillery and mortar fire
- Informant, a person who provides privileged information about a person or organization to an agency

== Hobby observation ==
- Weather spotter, an individual who observes the weather to inform media or others
  - Storm spotter, a weather spotter who observes severe weather events
- Aircraft spotter, a hobbyist who tracks and records the movement of aircraft
- Bus spotter, a hobbyist who seeks to see all buses in a particular fleet or produced by a particular manufacturer
- Wildlife observation, noting the occurrence or abundance of animal species for research or recreation
- Trainspotter, a person interested, recreationally, in rail transport
- Ship watching, tracking and observing the passage of various ships
- Satellite spotter, a hobbyist who observes and tracks artificial satellites that are orbiting Earth

== Other uses ==
- Spotter (maneuvering), an individual who helps guide a vehicle
- A local writer for Spotted by Locals travel guides
- Various dolphin species of the genus Stenella
- Shark spotter, someone who engages in shark surveillance for shark attack prevention
- An American term for a banksman

== See also ==
- Spot (disambiguation)
- Forward air control, the provision of guidance to military close air support aircraft
