= Guidebook =

Book about a place for visitors or tourists

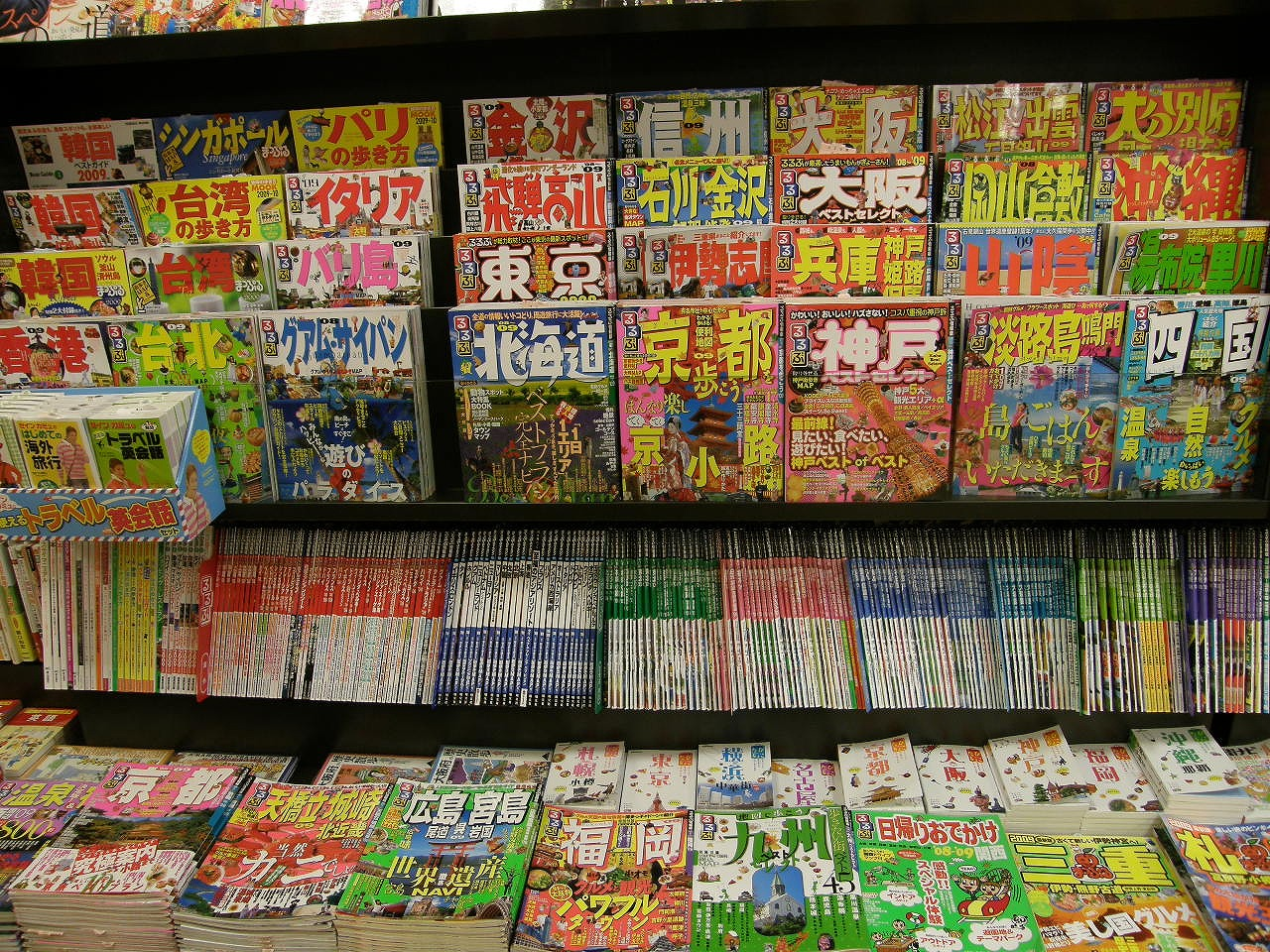
An assortment of guidebooks in Japan

A guidebook or travel guide is a book of information about a place designed for the use of visitors or tourists that normatively covers information about sights, accommodation, restaurants, transportation, and activities; they can also take the form of travel websites. Maps of varying detail and historical and cultural information are often included. Different kinds of guidebooks exist, focusing on different aspects of travel, from adventure travel to relaxation, to personal variables such as diets and incomes.

== History ==
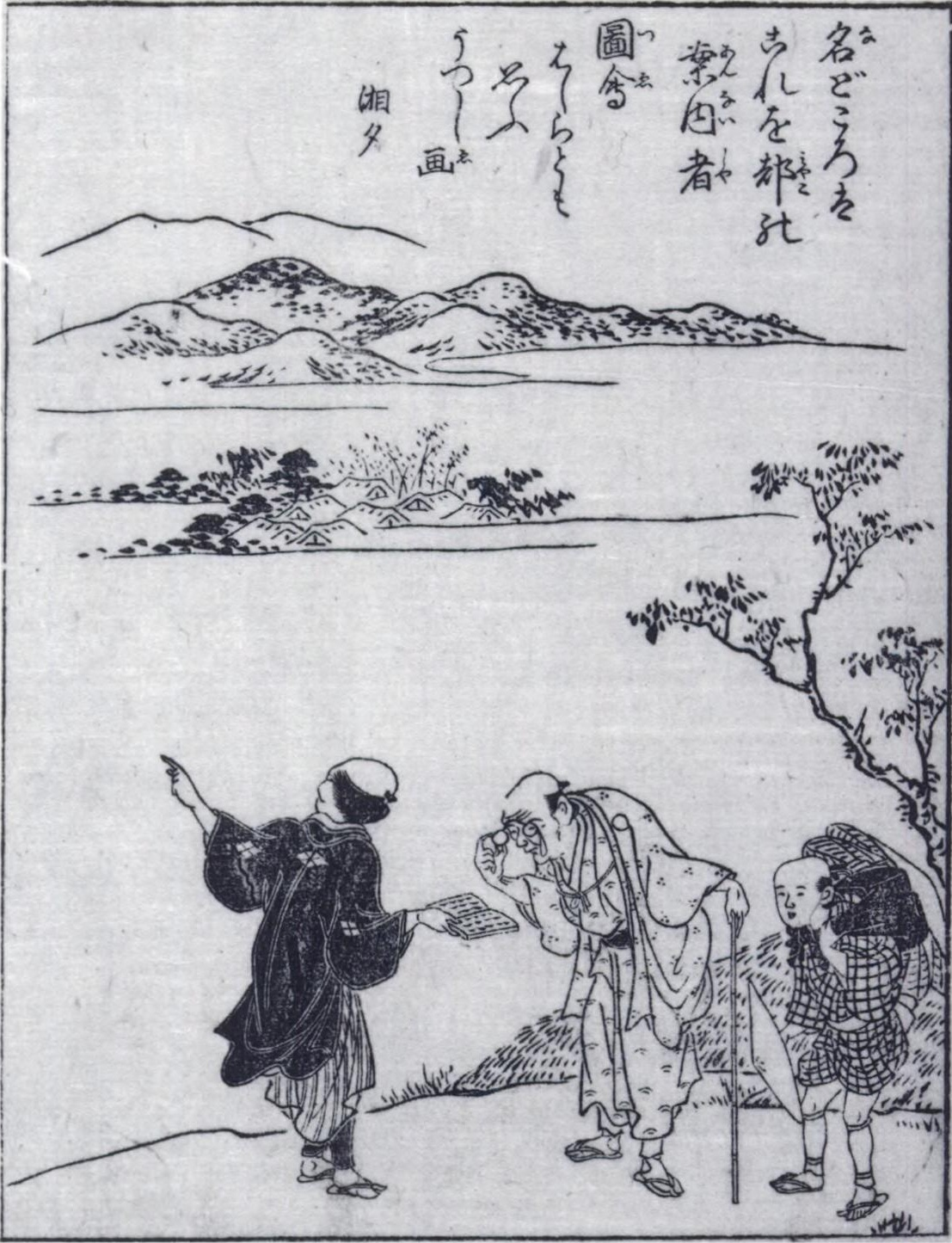
A Japanese tourist consulting a tour guide and a guidebook from Akizato Ritō's Miyako meisho zue (1787)

=== Antiquity ===
A forerunner of the guidebook was the periplus, an itinerary from landmark to landmark of the ports along a coast. A periplus such as the Periplus of the Erythraean Sea was a manuscript document that listed, in order, the ports and coastal landmarks, with approximate intervening distances, that the captain of a vessel could expect to find along a shore. This work was possibly written in the middle of the 1st century CE. It served the same purpose as the later Roman itinerarium of road stops.

The periegesis, or "progress around" was an established literary genre during the Hellenistic age. A lost work by Agaclytus describing Olympia (περὶ Ὀλυμπίας) is referred to by the Suda and Photius. Dionysius Periegetes (lit. 'Dionysius the Traveler') was the author of a description of the habitable world in Greek hexameter verse written in a terse and elegant style, intended for the klismos traveler rather than the actual tourist on the ground; he is believed to have worked in Alexandria and to have flourished around the time of Hadrian. An early "remarkably well-informed and interesting guidebook" was the Hellados Periegesis (Descriptions of Greece) of Pausanias of the 2nd century A.D. This most famous work is a guide to the interesting places, works of architecture, sculpture, and curious customs of Ancient Greece, and is still useful to Classicists today. With the advent of Christianity, the guide for the European religious pilgrim became a useful guidebook. An early account is that of the pilgrim Egeria, who visited the Holy Land in the 4th century CE and left a detailed itinerary.

In the medieval Arab world, guidebooks for travelers in search of artifacts and treasures were written by Arabic treasure hunters, magicians, and alchemists. This was particularly the case in Arab Egypt, where treasure hunters were eager to find valuable ancient Egyptian antiquities. Some of the books claimed to be imbued with magic that could dispel the magical barriers believed to be protecting the artifacts.

=== Travelogues ===
In China, travel record literature (遊記文學; yóujì wénxué) became popular during the Song Dynasty (960–1279). Often written in narrative, prose, essay and diary style, different travel literature authors used different styles in the works. For example, Fan Chengda (1126–1193) and Xu Xiake (1587–1641) incorporated a wealth of geographical and topographical information into their writing, while the "daytrip essay" Record of Stone Bell Mountain by the noted poet and statesman Su Shi (1037–1101) presented a philosophical and moral argument as its central purpose.

In the West, the guidebook developed from the published personal experiences of aristocrats who traveled through Europe on the Grand Tour. As the appreciation of art, architecture and antiquity became ever-more essential ingredients of the noble upbringing so they predominated in the guidebooks, particularly those devoted to the Italian peninsula. Richard Lassels (1603–1668) wrote a series of manuscript guides which were eventually published posthumously in Paris and London (1670) as The Voyage of Italy. Grand Tour guidebooks poured off the presses throughout the eighteenth century, those such as Patrick Brydone's A Tour Through Sicily and Malta being read by many who never left England.

Between 1626 and 1649, the Dutch publisher Officina Elzeviriana (House of Elzevir) published a bestselling pocketbook series, the Respublicae Elzevirianae (Elzevirian Republics), which has been described as the "ancestor of the modern travel guide". Each volume gave information (geography, population, economy, history) on a country in Europe, Africa, the Near East or the Far East.

An important transitional figure from the idiosyncratic style of the Grand Tour travelogues to the more informative and impersonal guidebook was Mariana Starke. Her 1824 guide to travel in France and Italy served as an essential companion for British travelers to the Continent in the early 19th century. She recognized that with the growing numbers of Britons traveling abroad after 1815 the majority of her readers would now be in family groups and on a budget. She therefore included for the first time a wealth of advice on luggage, obtaining passports, the precise cost of food and accommodation in each city and even advice on the care of invalid family members. She also devised a system of exclamation mark ratings [!!!], a forerunner of today's star ratings. Her books, published by John Murray, served as a template for later guides.

In the United States, the first published guidebook was Gideon Minor Davison's The Fashionable Tour, published in 1822, and Theodore Dwight's The Northern Traveler and Henry Gilpin's The Northern Tour, both from 1825.

=== Modern guidebook ===
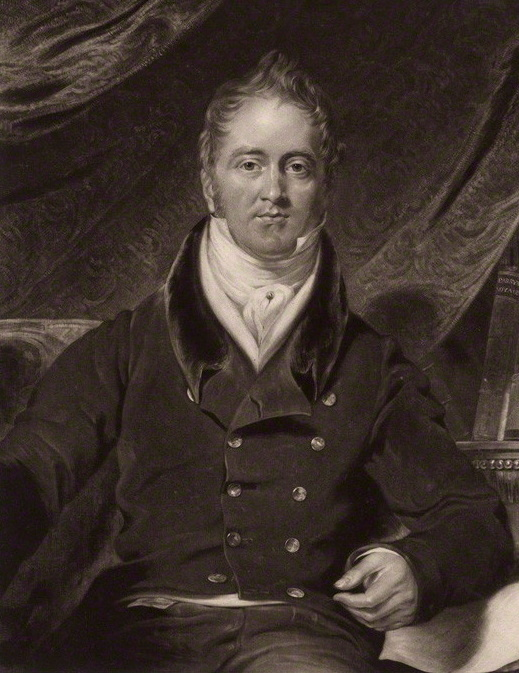
John Murray

The modern guidebook emerged in the 1830s, with the burgeoning market for long distance tourism. The publisher John Murray began printing Murray's Handbooks in London from 1836. The series covered tourist destinations in Europe, Asia and northern Africa, and he introduced the concept of "sights" which he rated in terms of their significance using stars for Starke's exclamation points. According to scholar James Buzard, the Murray style "exemplified the exhaustive rational planning that was as much an ideal of the emerging tourist industry as it was of British commercial and industrial organization generally."

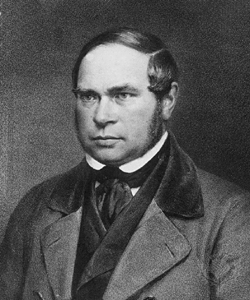
Karl Baedeker

In Germany, Karl Baedeker acquired the publishing house of Franz Friedrich Röhling in Koblenz, which in 1828 had published a handbook for travelers by Professor Johannes August Klein entitled Rheinreise von Mainz bis Köln; ein Handbuch für Schnellreisende (A Rhine Journey from Mainz to Cologne; A Handbook for Travelers on the Move). He published this book with little changes for the next ten years, which provided the seeds for Baedeker's new approach to travel guides. After Klein died, he decided to publish a new edition in 1839, to which he added many of his own ideas on what he thought a travel guide should offer the traveler. Baedeker's ultimate aim was to free the traveler from having to look for information anywhere outside the travel guide. Baedeker emulated the style of John Murray's guidebooks, but included unprecedented detailed information.

In 1846, Baedeker introduced his star ratings for sights, attractions and lodgings, following Mrs. Starke's and Murray's. This edition was also his first "experimental" red guide. He also decided to call his travel guides "handbooks", following the example of John Murray III. Baedeker's early guides had tan covers, but from 1856 onwards, Murray's red bindings and gilt lettering became the familiar hallmark of all Baedeker guides as well, and the content became famous for its clarity, detail and accuracy.

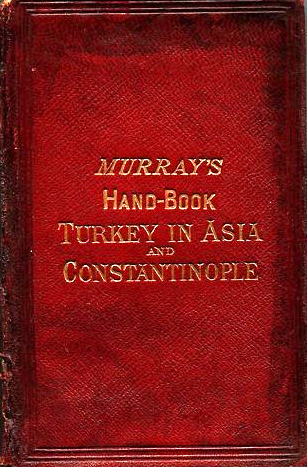
Cover of Murray's Handbook, 1871

Baedeker and Murray produced impersonal, objective guides; works prior to this combined factual information and personal sentimental reflection. The availability of the books by Baedeker and Murray helped sharpen and formalize the complementary genre of the personal travelogue, which was freed from the burden of serving as a guidebook. The Baedeker and Murray guidebooks were hugely popular and were standard resources for travelers well into the 20th century. As William Wetmore Story said in the 1860s, "Every Englishman abroad carries a Murray for information, and a Byron for sentiment, and finds out by them what he is to know and feel by every step."

After Karl Baedeker died, his son, also named Karl, inherited the Baedeker travel guide business; however, he was killed in action during World War I. British nationalism and anti-German sentiment resulted in some British people labeling Baedeker guides "instrumental to the German war effort", and their popularity in the United Kingdom dropped considerably. As a result, the two editors of Baedeker's English-language titles left the company and acquired the rights to Murray's Handbooks. The resulting guidebooks, called the Blue Guides to distinguish them from the red-covered Baedekers, constituted one of the major guidebook series for much of the 20th century and are still published today.

=== Postwar ===
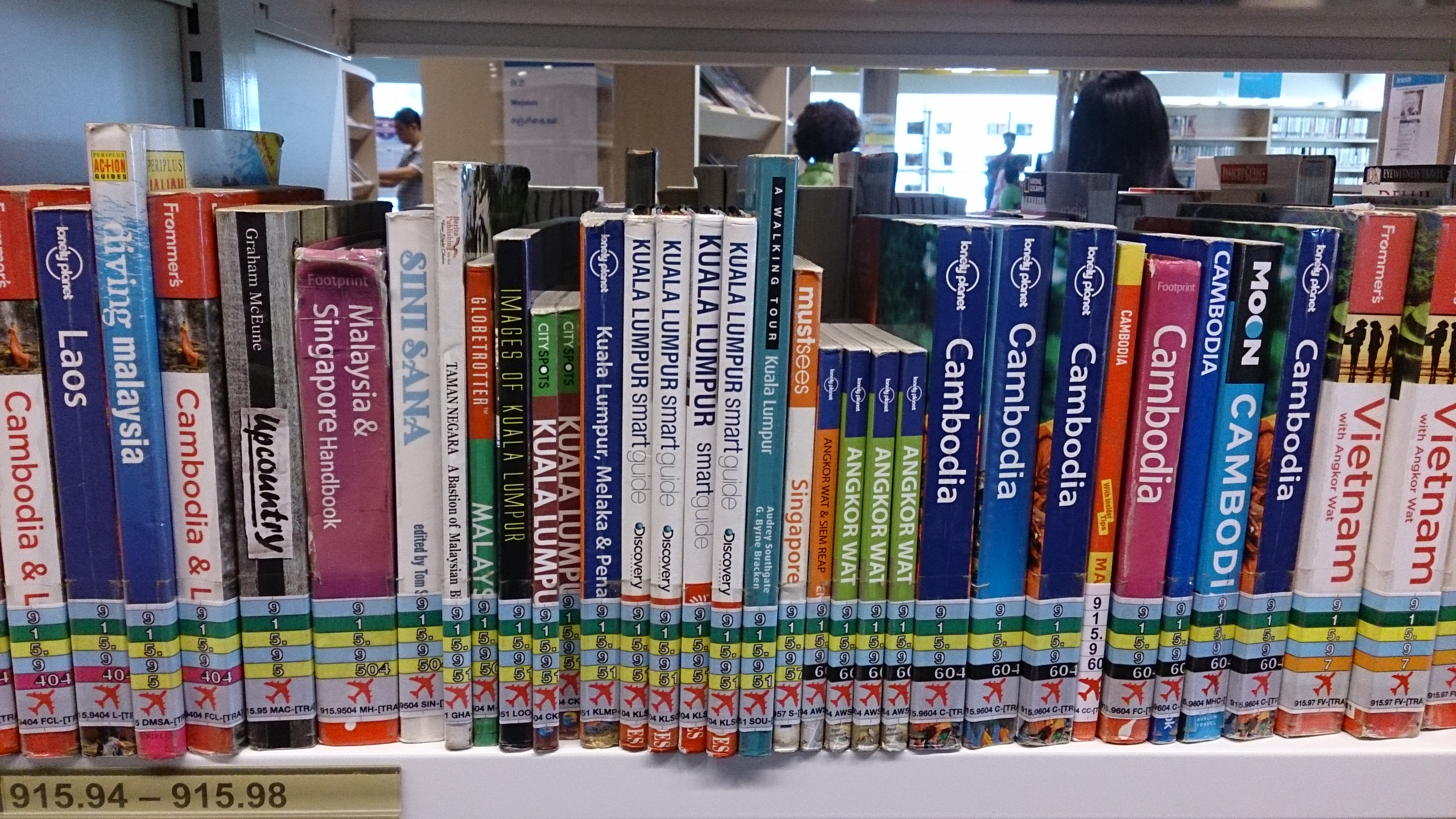
English-language guidebooks

Soon after World War II, two new names emerged which combined European and American perspectives on international travel. Eugene Fodor, a Hungarian-born author of travel articles, who had emigrated to the United States before the war, wrote guidebooks which introduced English-reading audiences to continental Europe. Arthur Frommer, an American soldier stationed in Europe during the Korean War, used his experience traveling around the Continent as the basis for Europe on $5 a Day (1957), which introduced readers to options for budget travel in Europe. Both authors' guidebooks became the foundations for extensive series, eventually covering global destinations.

Since then, Let's Go, Lonely Planet, Insight Guides, Rough Guides, Eyewitness Travel Guides and many other travel guide series have been published.

== For specific activities ==
Specialist climbing guidebooks for mountains have a long history owing to the special needs of mountaineering, rock climbing, hill walking, and scrambling. The guides by W A Poucher for example, are widely used for the hill regions of Britain. There are many more special guides to the numerous climbing grounds in Britain published by the Climbers Club, for example.

Travel guides are made for diving destinations and specific dive sites. These have been published as magazine articles, standalone books and websites, often publicizing the dive sites in the vicinity of specific service providers.

== Digital world ==
With the emergence of digital technology, many publishers turned to electronic distribution, either in addition to or instead of print publication. This can take the form of downloadable documents for reading on a portable computer or hand held device such a PDA or iPod, or online information accessible via a web site. This enabled guidebook publishers to keep their information more current. Traditional guidebook incumbents Lonely Planet, Frommers, Rough Guides, and In Your Pocket City Guides, and newcomers such as Schmap or Ulysses Travel Guides are now offering travel guides for download. New online and interactive guides such as Tripadvisor, Wikivoyage, and Travellerspoint enable individual travelers to share their own experiences and contribute information to the guide. Wikivoyage, CityLeaves, and Travellerspoint make the entire contents of their guides updatable by users, and make the information in their guides available as open content, free for others to use.

== Guidebook publishers ==
This list is a select sample of the full range of English language guidebook publishers - either contemporary or historical:

- W.J. Adams
- AAA/CAA TourBook
- D. Appleton & Co.
- Baedeker
- Berlitz
- Adam and Charles Black
- Blue Guides
- Bradt
- Cicerone Press
- Citysearch
- Coghlan's Guides
- Thomas Cook & Son
- DOM publishers
- DK Eyewitness Travel
- FalconGuides
- Fodor's
- For Dummies
- Forbes Travel Guide
- Foursquare City Guide
- Footprint Books
- Frommer's
- Green Book - specialized for Black car drivers in segregated America
- Harper & Brothers
- Heywood Guides
- History Press
- Insight Guides
- In Your Pocket
- Let's Go
- Lonely Planet
- Michelin Guide - specialized in restaurants
- Moon Handbooks
- John Murray
- National Geographic Traveler
- Nicholson Guides
- Not For Tourists
- Rick Steves
- Rough Guides
- Spartacus International Gay Guide - specialized in gay tourists
- Spotted by Locals
- Stanford's Guides
- Time Out
- Touring Club Italiano - covering tourism in Italy
- Vinologue
- Wallpaper City Guides
- Ward Lock & Co.
- Weird US
- Wikivoyage - edited by users
- wordtravels.com

== See also ==
- Audio tour, also known as Audioguide – Recorded commentary at a visitor attraction
- Mirabilia Urbis Romae – Collection of texts describing Rome
- De mirabilibus urbis Romae – Medieval guide in Latin to the splendours of Rome
- List of literary descriptions of cities (before 1550)
- Outdoor literature – Literary genre about or involving the outdoors
- Travel literature – Literary genre
- Textbook – Type of academic study book (for academic "guidebooks" i.e. brief reference works)
- Guide to Reference – Daniel Ayobami Obasa (selective guide to print and online reference sources)
