= Ievgeniia Gubkina =

Ukrainian activist and architectural historian

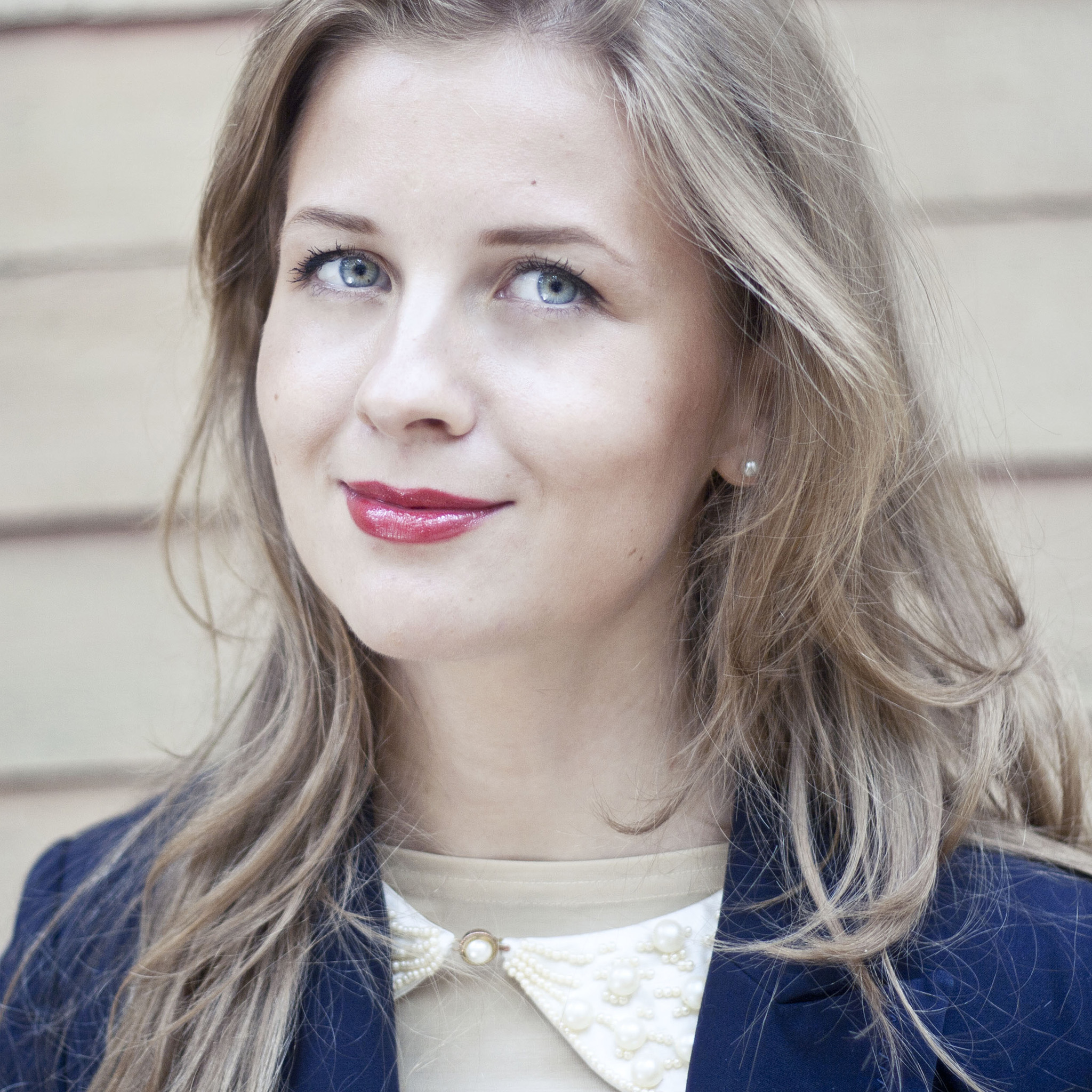
- Ievgeniia Gubkina in 2011
- Born: May 7, 1985 (age 40); Kharkiv
- Education: Kharkiv National Academy of Urban Economy
- Occupations: Architect; Architectural historian

Ievgeniia "Jenia" Gubkina (born 7 May 1985) is a Ukrainian architect, architectural and urban historian, and curator specializing in architecture and urban planning of the 20th century in Ukraine, and a multidisciplinary approach to heritage studies. Since 2014 she has co-founded the NGO Urban Forms Center and the avant-garde women's movement "Modernistki".

== Life and career ==
Ievgeniia Gubkina was born in Kharkiv in a family of architects. In 2008 she graduated with honors from the Faculty of Architecture of the Kharkiv National Academy of Urban Economy with a degree in urban planning. From 2008 to 2011 she studied in its PhD program Theory of Architecture and Restoration of Architectural Monuments.

From 2006 to 2008 she worked as an architect in OJSC "Kharkiv Design Institute".

In 2014 she co-founded the NGO Urban Forms Center, starting her involvement in activism in architecture and heritage preservation.

From 2015 to 2018 Gubkina was a researcher at the Center for Urban History of East Central Europe in Lviv. She launched and supervised the development of the very first architectural and interdisciplinary summer schools in Ukraine, in particular, "New Lviv" in Lviv (2015) and "The Idea of the City: Reality Check" in Slavutych (2016)

Her first book, Slavutych: Architectural Guide, was published in 2015 by DOM publishers in Germany and was dedicated to the architecture of the last Soviet city of Slavutych, built after the Chernobyl disaster for workers of the Chernobyl Nuclear Power Plant. In 2019, after many years of research, her second book, Soviet Modernism. Brutalism. Post-Modernism. Buildings and Structures in Ukraine 1955–1991, was published by Osnovy Publishing and DOM. The book was published in English and included photographs from all over Ukraine of the most stunning objects of Soviet-Ukrainian architecture of the second half of the 20th century.

In 2020, Gubkina curated Encyclopedia of Ukrainian Architecture, a multimedia online project that worked with architecture, history, criticism, cinema and visual arts. Through various media tools it demonstrates the panorama of Ukrainian architecture, analyzing how society and architecture shape each other.

In 2021, she became an author and screenwriter of the audiovisual project "Ukrainian Constructivism", created at the intersection of contemporary visual art, ballet, electro-folk music, and historical drama. The project involved Ukrainian musicians Nata Zhyzhchenko (Onuka) and Yevhen Filatov (the Maneken), Ukrainian-Danish artist and architect Sergei Sviatchenko, and Danish choreographer Sebastian Kloborg. The project is based on the true story of Lotte Stam-Beese, a young German modernist architect from the Bauhaus school, who lived and worked in Kharkiv in the early 1930s.

Regularly publishing scientific and journalistic articles in Ukrainian and foreign magazines and online media (The Calvert Journal, Springerin, RGOW, Obieg, ERA21, Dérive, Tribune, Bauwelt), in 2021 she became a columnist for L'Officiel Hommes Ukraine, publishing articles on architecture and interviews with famous architects.

Gubkina co-directed You See, Time Becomes Space Here (in collaboration with Tetjana Kononenko), a short documentary released in 2022 about Freedom Square and Derzhprom in Kharkiv, a large-scale modernist urban planning project of the interwar period.

In 2022, due to the outbreak of Russia's full-scale war against Ukraine, Ievgeniia Gubkina and her teenage daughter were forced to flee their hometown of Kharkiv. They found asylum in Jūrmala, then in Paris, and eventually settled in London where she received Randolph Quirk Fellowship at UCL. Giving public lectures and speeches at conferences, symposia, and other public events, as well as giving interviews and publishing her essays and manifestos throughout Europe, Gubkina has become one of the strongest voices calling for the protection of Ukrainian cultural heritage during wartime, appealing to inaction and connivance of international organizations in this domain.

== Selected publications ==
- Slavutych: Architectural Guide. Berlin: DOM publishers, 2015. ISBN 978-3869224244
- Soviet Modernism. Brutalism. Post-Modernism. Buildings and Structures in Ukraine 1955–1991. Berlin: DOM publishers, 2019 (with Alex Bykov). ISBN 978-3-86922-706-1
- Bauhaus – Zaporizhzhia. Zaporizhzhia Modernism and Bauhaus School: Universality of Phenomena. Problems of Preserving Modernist Heritage. Kharkiv: Urban Forms Center, 2018 (ed.). ISBN 978-617-7645-32-9
