= Manor of Denbury =

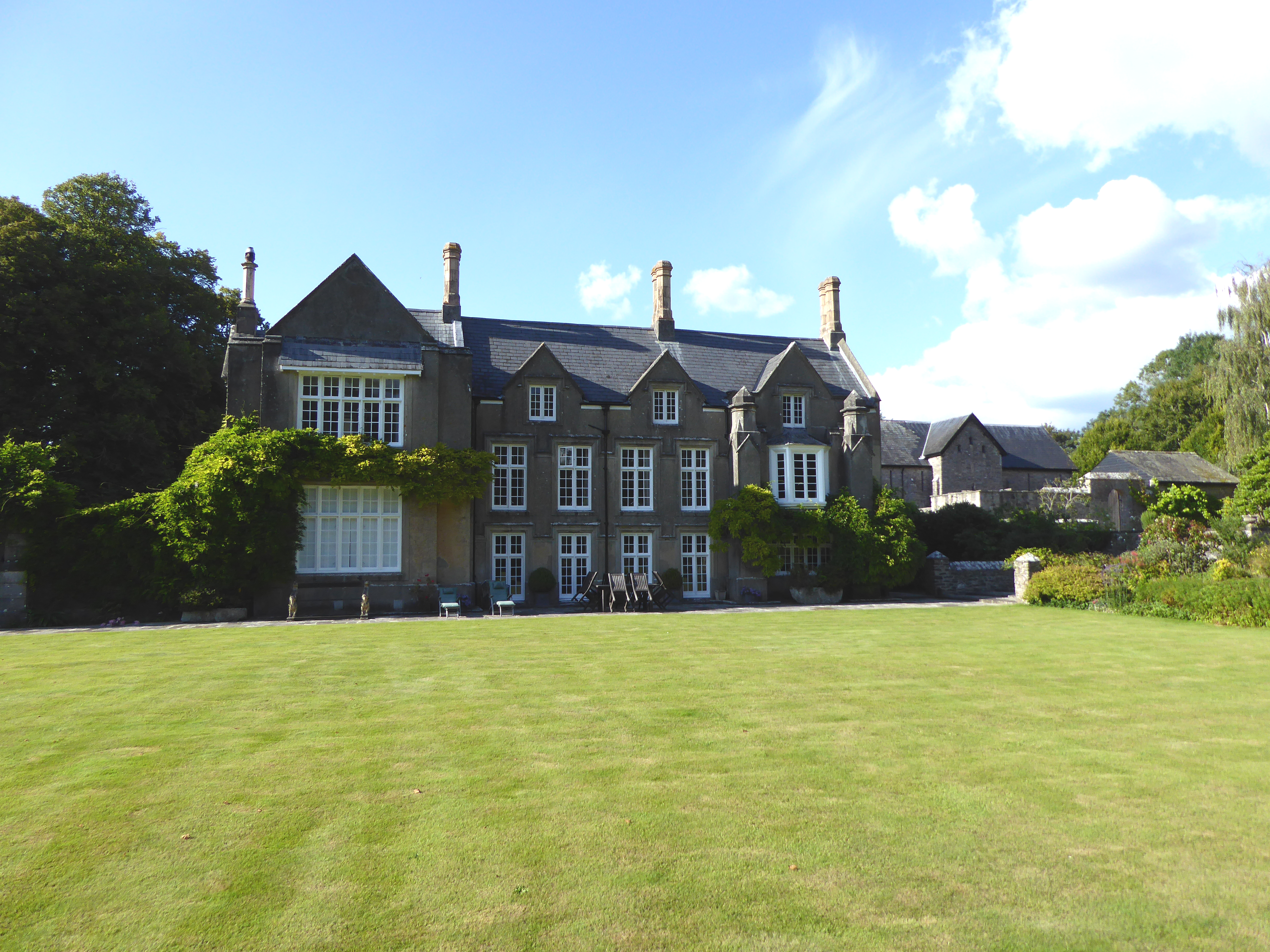
Denbury House in 2017

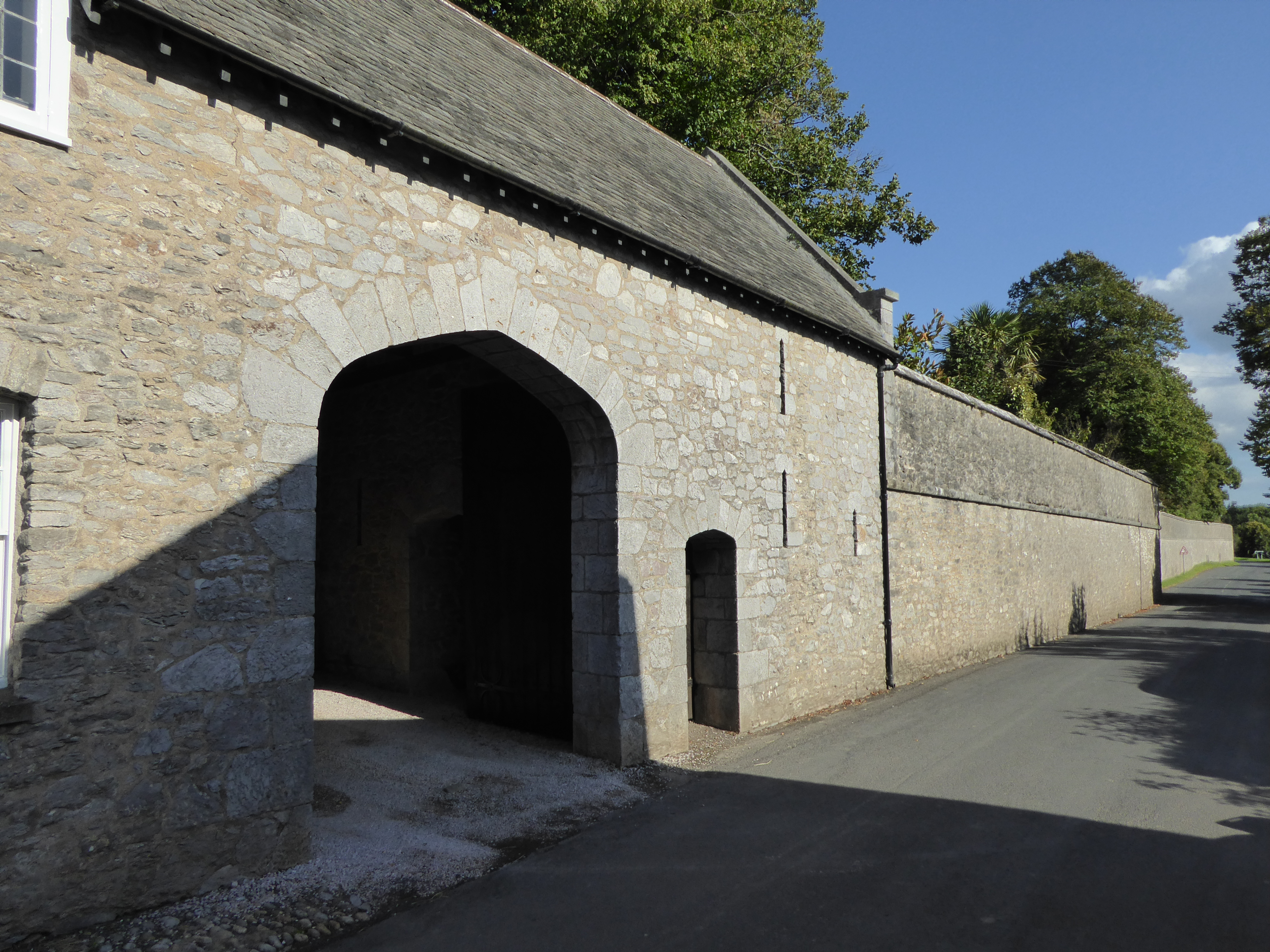
Gatehouse and boundary wall of Denbury House, built by Walter Septimus Curtis circa 1912-14 and displaying his coat of arms above the inner gate

Denbury is an historic manor in Devonshire, England. The manor house, known as Denbury Manor is situated on the edge of the village of Denbury.

== Descent ==
=== Reynell ===
The manor of Denbury was long owned by the Reynell family of East Ogwell in Devon, also seated at adjoining West Ogwell. The Reynell estates passed by marriage to the Taylor family.

=== Taylor ===
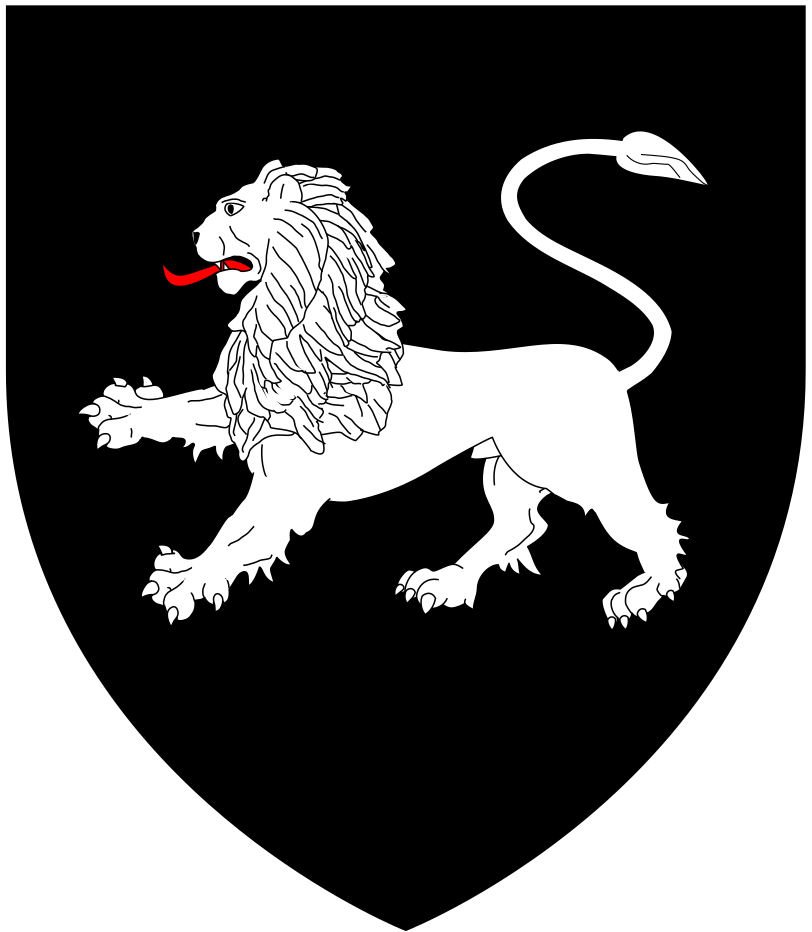
Arms of Taylor of West Ogwell: Sable, a lion passant argent

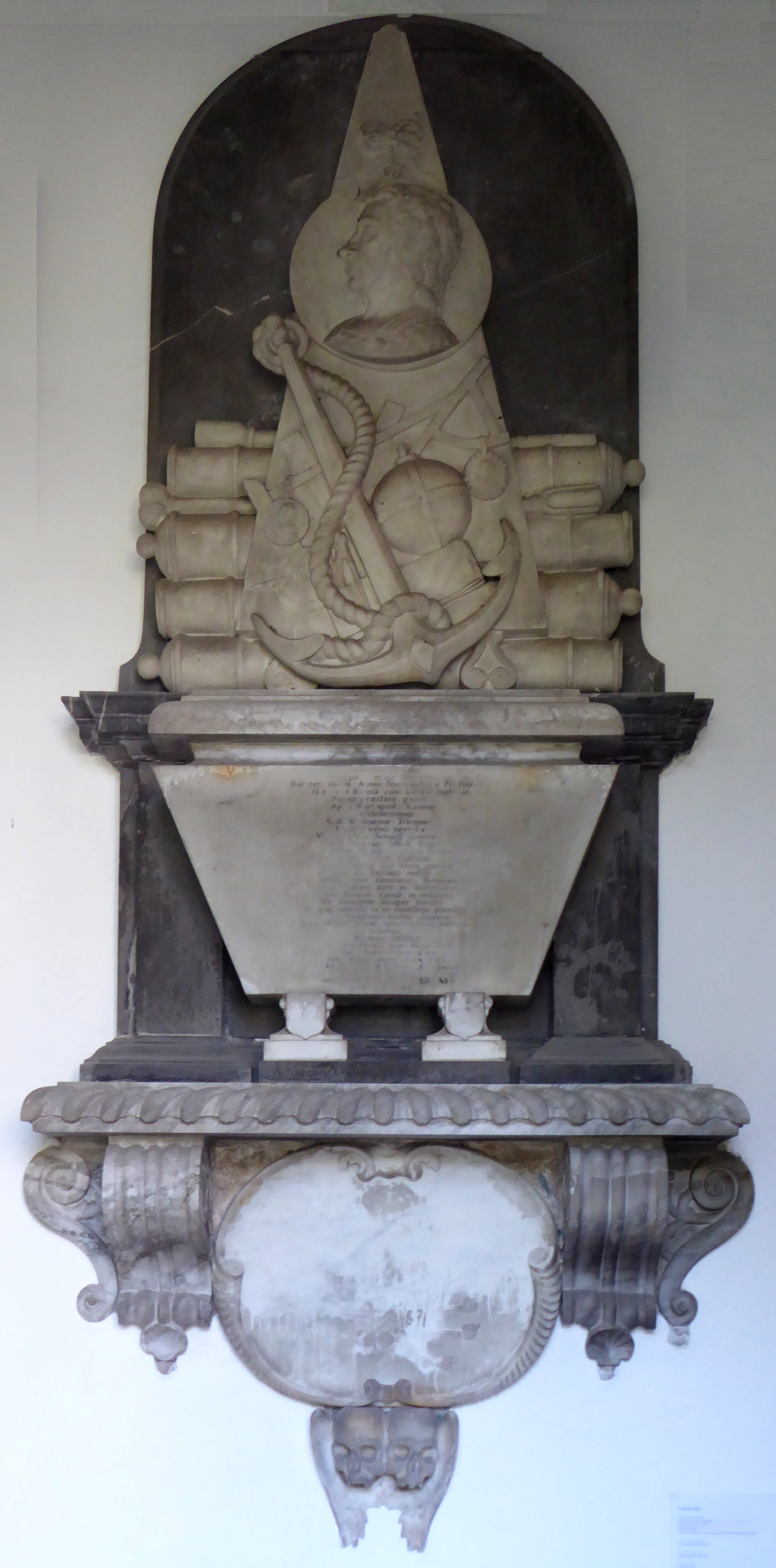
Mural monument of Capt. Joseph Taylor (d.1733), Royal Navy. Taylor Chapel in Denbury Church

==== Joseph Taylor (c.1693-1746) ====
In 1726 Joseph Taylor (c.1693-1746) married Rebecca Whitrow, daughter of John Whitrow of Dartmouth and niece and heiress of Richard Reynell (c.1681-1734/5) of East Ogwell, West Ogwell and of Denbury, twice elected a Member of Parliament for Ashburton 1702-8 and 1711-34. Joseph Taylor was the son of Captain Joseph Taylor (died 1733), Royal Navy, of Plymouth, whose family was from Lyme Regis in Dorset, who was captain of the flag-ship stationed at Plymouth at the time of the death of Queen Anne in 1714. The mural monument of Captain Joseph Taylor is in Denbury Church sculpted by John Weston of Exeter, is in the shape of a grey obelisk on the top part of which is sculpted a portrait medallion, and on the lower part a relief-sculpted anchor and other naval symbols and several canon which appear to lie behind the obelisk, with an inscribed sarcophagus below. The lengthy Latin inscription, now much faded, was composed by his friend Dr. Williams, of Exeter. Joseph Taylor (died 1746) was a Member of Parliament for Ashburton 1739-41 and was educated at Exeter College, Oxford and as a law student at the Middle Temple. Richard Reynell had bequeathed his estates "to be sold for the benefit of" his niece Rebecca Whitrow, Taylor's wife, and Taylor duly purchased such estates as the "absolute estate of inheritance — in Devon or elsewhere" which, as required by his marriage settlement, he settled upon his wife and his eldest son.

==== Thomas Taylor (born 1727) ====
Thomas Taylor (born 1727), eldest son, who married Eliza Pierce (d.1776), daughter and heiress of Adam Pierce of Yendacott in the parish of Shobrooke, Devon. As her surviving correspondence reveals she was "a cultured and intelligent woman, who had strong opinions of her own concerning not only the running of her life but also on the subjects of books and literature". In about 1750 Thomas Taylor began to rebuild the manor house at West Ogwell, as recorded by Polwhele (1793): "Three parts of this parish at present are the property of Mr Taylor who built a large house here about forty years ago but left it unfinished. It stands near the church and is occupied by Farmer Howard, who rents the estate and whose family are more than half the parisioners."

==== Pierce Joseph Taylor (1754-1832) ====
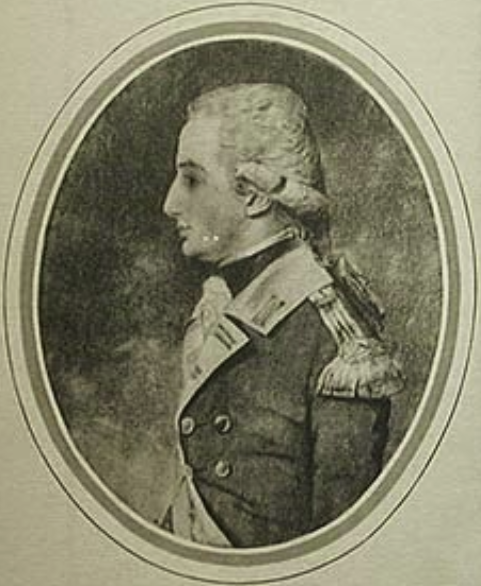
Portrait of Pierce Joseph Taylor (1754-1832) by John Downman (1750-1824)

Pierce Joseph Taylor (1754-1832) of West Ogwell and of Denbury House, son and heir, who in 1790 completed the rebuilding of West Ogwell House commenced by his father. The manor house of East Ogwell was then abandoned, and Polwhele (1793) wrote of East Ogwell Church: "Close adjoining to the church are the ivy-grown ruins of the mansion house of the Reynells, inhabited at present by large flocks of pigeons". Pierce Joseph Taylor was educated at Eton College and his correspondence whilst a pupil there to his mother survives (See: The Letters of Eliza Pierce 1751-1775, with Letters from her son Pierce Joseph Taylor, a schoolboy at Eton, Edited by Violet M. Macdonald, London, 1927). He was promoted to Lt-Captain to Captain in the 3rd Dragoon Guards in January 1779. In 1781 when a Captain in the 21st Light Dragoons his portrait was painted by John Downman. He married Charlotte Cooke (d.1837), 5th daughter ("one of the beautiful daughters") of Rev. William Cooke, Dean of Ely and Provost of King's College, Cambridge. His son was Maj-Gen Thomas William Taylor (1782-1854), CB, of West Ogwell House, an officer of the Honourable East India Company at Madras, and later Lt-Gov of the Royal Military College, Sandhurst and a Groom of the Bedchamber to King William IV, whose mural monument survives in Denbury Church.

=== Froude ===
In 1807 Denbury was sold by the Taylor family of West Ogwell to Mrs. Robert Froude, mother of Rev. Robert Froude (1771–1859), Archdeacon of Totnes, Rector of Dartington and Rector of Denbury. Denbury was conveyed to her two daughters for life. The present manor house comprises a 17th-century core to which was added a Georgian facade, with later pseudo-mediaeval alterations in 1825 by Rev. Hurrell Froude (1803-1836), son of the Archdeacon and an Anglican priest and an early leader of the Oxford Movement.

=== Curtis ===
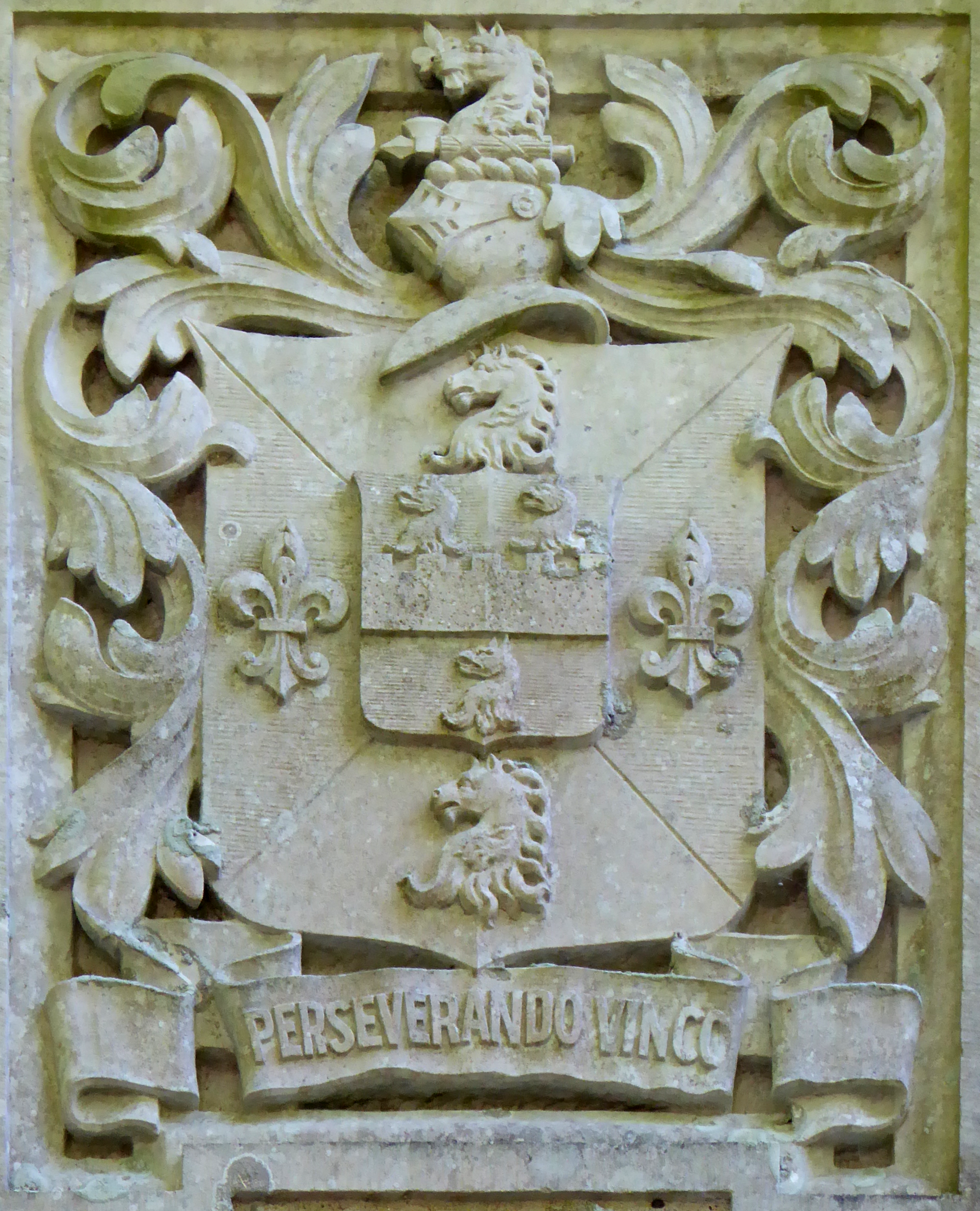
Arms of Curtis with inescutcheon of pretence of Masters, with Latin motto Perseverando Vinco ("I win by persevering"); gatehouse of Denbury House

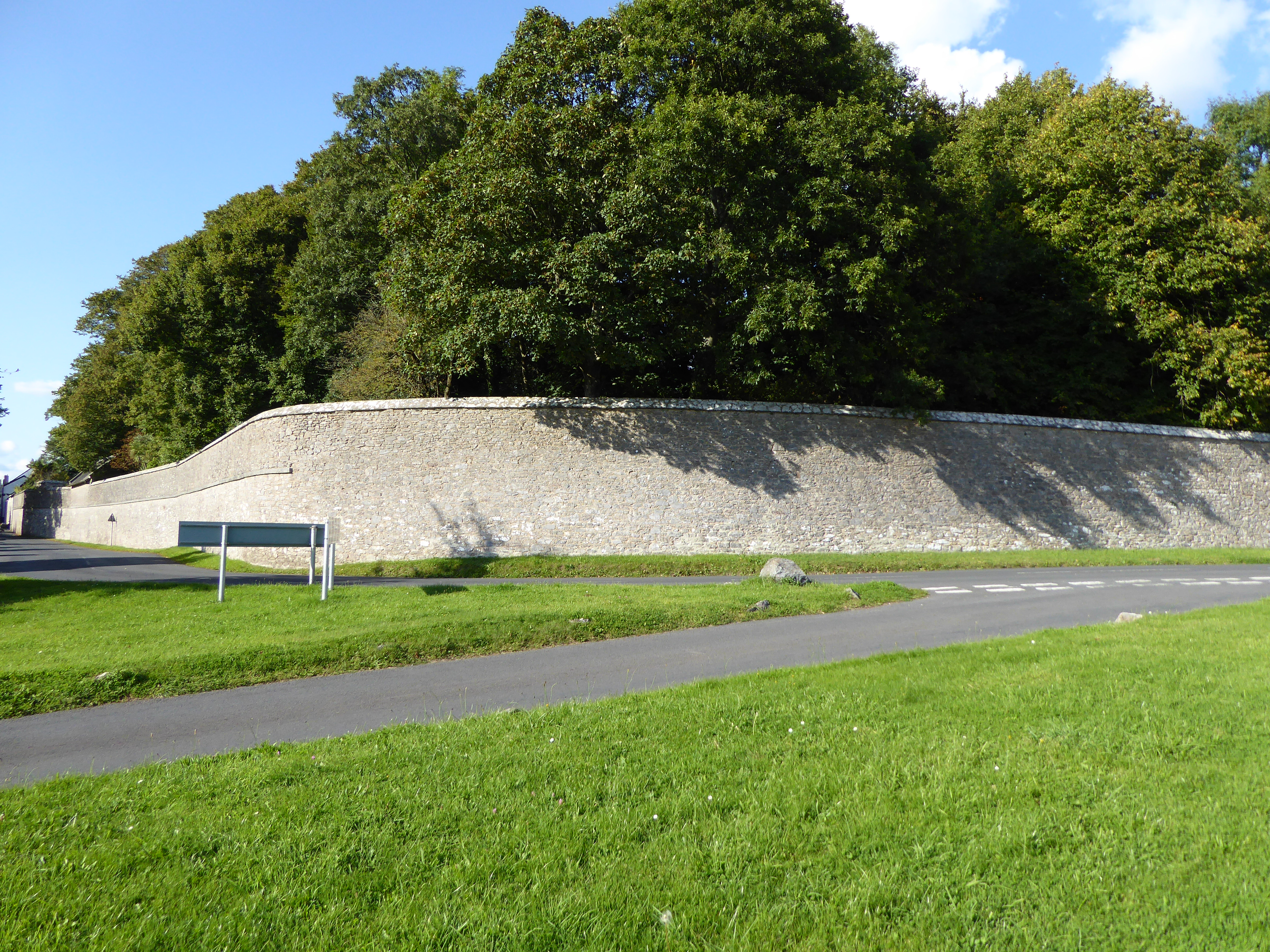
Part of the extraordinarily high and long fortress-like wall built by Walter Curtis c.1912-14 around the grounds of Denbury House. The gatehouse giving access to the house is at left, on the edge of the village

Walter Septimus Curtis (born 1871) was the owner of the estate in the early 1900s. He was lord of the manors of Denbury and of adjoining Newton Abbot and Newton Bushel. He was a barrister of Lincoln's Inn and was educated at Trinity Hall, Cambridge. He was the 3rd and youngest son of John Curtis (1836-1878) by his wife Juliana Davies, eldest daughter of John Davies of Manchester. Walter's grandfather was Matthew Curtis (1807–1887) of Thornfield in the parish of Heaton Mersey, Lancashire, the leading manufacturer of cotton-spinning machinery in Britain and thrice Mayor of Manchester. Walter married Eleanor Francis Master, daughter and heiress of Robert Edward Master, JP, Madras Civil Service, of Hillingdon Furze, Uxbridge, Middlesex, by whom he had one son, Robert Master Curtis (born 1920) and 6 daughters, including Lettice Curtis (1915-2014) an aviator, flight test engineer, air racing pilot, and sportswoman. Walter Curtis made substantial additions including the gatehouse and the very high (5 metre) and very long boundary wall in which it is set, probably built between 1912 and 1914, which stretches from the village of Denbury for several hundred yards along the roadside, past Denbury Green. His coat of arms (Per saltire argent and azure two horse's heads erased in pale gules and in fess as many fleurs-de-lys of the first with inescutcheon of pretence for Master Azure, a fess embattled between three griffin's heads erased or) is sculpted on a stone tablet above the inner entrance of the gatehouse.

=== Townsend ===
In 1975 Denbury manor house was the home of Lt-Col. Cyril Moseley Townsend (d.29 May 1997), Durham Light Infantry. He was the son of Admiral Cyril Samuel Townsend by his wife Mary Elizabeth Moseley. His gravestone in the graveyard of Denbury Church is inscribed: "In loving memory of Lt.Col. Cyril M. Townsend of Denbury Manor late the Durham Light Infantry. August 8th 1908 - May 29th 1997 and of Lois Isabel Townsend D.St.J. (née Henderson) March 31st 1907 - Dec 31st 1997 aged 90, beloved wife of the above for 63 years". His daughter is Mrs Tessa Carol Amies (living 2003), a trustee of the Parish Lands Charity of Denbury.

=== Howe ===
In 2017 Denbury Manor House is the home of Timothy Roger Howe (born 1951) a banker and fund-manager with Singer & Friedlander.
