= Lettice Curtis =

English female aviator; Air Transport Auxiliary pilot

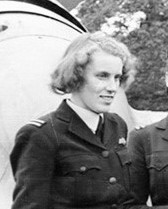
- Born: 1 February 1915; Denbury, Devon, England
- Died: 21 July 2014 (aged 99); Maidenhead, Berkshire, England
- Occupation: Engineer
- Known for: Flying

Eleanor Lettice Curtis (1 February 1915 – 21 July 2014) was an English aviator, flight test engineer, air racing pilot, and sportswoman.

== Origins ==
Curtis was born on 1 February 1915 at Denbury in Devon, a daughter of Eleanor Francis (née Master) and Walter Septimus Curtis (born 1871) of Denbury House. Her father was lord of the manor of Denbury, a barrister of Lincoln's Inn and a grandson of Matthew Curtis (1807–1887) of Thornfield in the parish of Heaton Mersey, Lancashire, a leading manufacturer of cotton-spinning machinery in Britain and thrice Mayor of Manchester. She had one brother and five sisters.

== Early life ==
Curtis was educated at Benenden School and St Hilda's College, Oxford where, in addition to studying Mathematics, she was Captain of the University Women's Lawn Tennis and Fencing teams. She also played Lacrosse for the University.

She learned to fly in 1937 at the Yapton Flying Club, Ford, West Sussex, earning a B–class licence.

== Air Transport Auxiliary ==
In early July 1940 Curtis became one of the first women pilots to join the British Air Transport Auxiliary (ATA), remaining with the ATA until 30 November 1945, when the organisation was closed down.

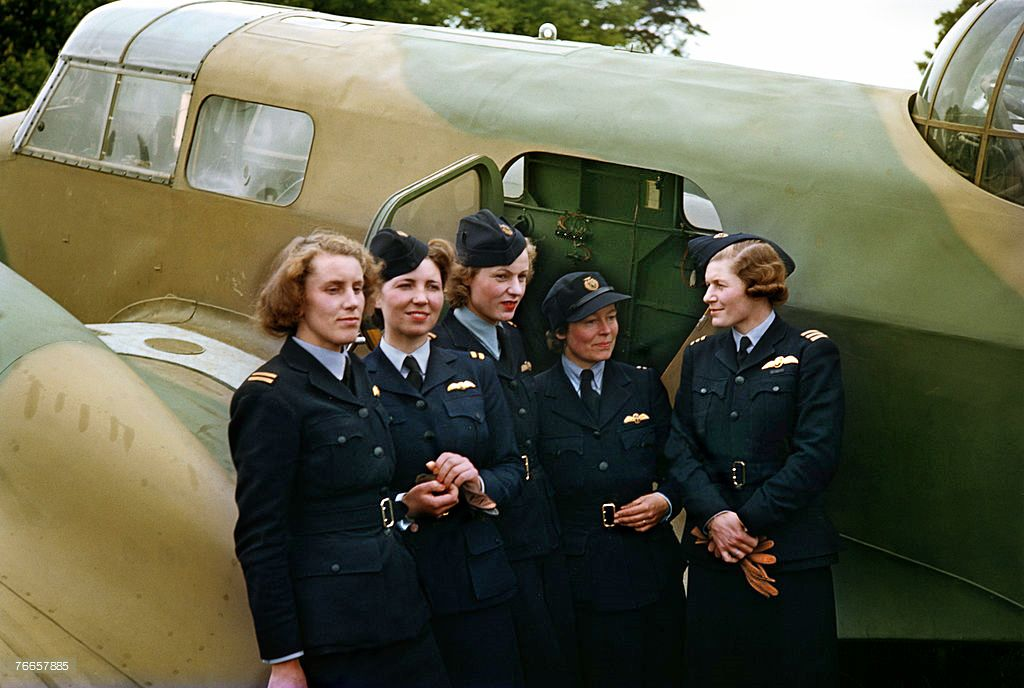
Five ATA flyers Lettice Curtis, Jenny Broad, Audrey Sale-Barker, Gabrielle Patterson and Pauline Gower by an Airspeed Oxford trainer in 1942

She commenced her ATA career by delivering primary training aircraft such as the Tiger Moth, progressing to the Miles Master and North American Harvard advanced trainers. During her ATA service she graduated to fly all categories of wartime aircraft and was one of the first dozen women to qualify to fly four-engined heavy bombers. She was the first woman pilot to deliver an Avro Lancaster bomber and also flew 222 Handley Page Halifaxes and 109 Short Stirlings. She flew continually during World War II from various Ferry Pool locations delivering all types through all weather to various destinations. According to Whittell [pp. 193–94] she flew "thirteen days on, two off, for sixty-two consecutive months", between July 1940 and September 1945.

On 26 October 1942 she was introduced to US First Lady Eleanor Roosevelt as the first woman pilot to be trained on four-engined bombers, during Roosevelt's visit to the ATA at White Waltham Airfield in Maidenhead. By that point, Curtis had already flown 90 different types of aircraft. Her final ATA rank was as First Officer.

== Post-war life ==
After the war, Curtis became a technician and flight test observer at the A&AEE military aircraft test establishment at Boscombe Down, moving later to Fairey Aviation, where she was a senior flight development engineer. She took an active part in British air racing, flying various aircraft including her Wicko and a Spitfire XI owned by the American air attaché in London. She was a founding member of the British Women Pilots' Association. She qualified to fly helicopters in October 1992 and continued to fly aircraft until voluntarily "grounding" herself in 1995.

With the nationalisation of the aircraft industry in the 1960s she left Fairey for the Ministry of Aviation, working for a number of years on the initial planning of the joint civil/RAF Air Traffic Control Centre at West Drayton. Later under the United Kingdom Civil Aviation Authority, she worked for the Flight Operations Directorate. Retiring from the CAA in 1976, she took a job with a firm supplying contractors to the Sperry Corporation at Bracknell.

Curtis died in Maidenhead, Berkshire on 21 July 2014 at the age of 99.

== Commemoration ==
In 2025, Curtis was one of ten women "who played vital roles during World War II" to be honoured with a silhouette statue created by Standing with Giants for the Women of War exhibition at Lincoln's International Bomber Command Centre.

== Notes ==
- Lettice Curtis, The Forgotten Pilots, Nelson & Saunders, Olney, Bucks, 1985, ISBN 0-947750-02-9
- Lettice Curtis, Lettice Curtis - her autobiography, Red Kite, Walton on Thames, 2004, ISBN 0-9546201-1-9
- Diana Barnato Walker, Spreading My Wings, Patrick Stephens, Yeovil, 1994, ISBN 1-85260-473-5
- Giles Whittell, "Spitfire Women of World War II", Harper Perennial, Hammersmith, 2008, ISBN 978-0-00-723536-0
