= Abel Heywood =

British publisher and radical (1810–1893)

Abel Heywood (25 February 1810 – 19 August 1893) was an English publisher, radical and mayor of Manchester.

== Early life ==
Abel was born into a poor family in Prestwich, who moved to Manchester after Heywood's father died in 1812. Abel obtained a basic education at the Anglican Bennett Street School, and at the age of nine started work in a warehouse for 1s and 6d a week. He supplemented his energetic autodidactism by attending the Mechanics' Institute, and following a summary dismissal by his manufacturing employer set up a penny reading room in Manchester at some point in 1831. He gained the Manchester agency for The Poor Man's Guardian, and made a point of refusing to pay the stamp duty intended to suppress mass publishing, being imprisoned in 1832 for four months for refusing to pay a £48 fine. Even though subject to heavy fines repeatedly throughout the next two years (which he paid), he continued his commitment to inexpensive newspapers. His bookselling business in Oldham Street was successful and continued for many years.

== Radicalism and Chartism ==
During the next two decades Heywood had an ambiguous relationship with Manchester's frenetic Radicalism and agitation. In 1828 he was involved in the protests to reform the management of the Mechanics' Institute. Run on the model of the Edinburgh School of Art, total power was given to honorary members, who paid £10 a year. The managers of the institution were then chosen by these honorary members, effectively ensuring constant middle class directorship. Anger over this and other matters such as the high annual subscription fee of £1 for ordinary members and the strict prohibition of political lectures or literature, including newspapers, eventually boiled over. A number of subscribers, including Heywood, signed a document demanding the right to be allowed to elect nine directors from their own ranks, and once this was met with an unsatisfactory compromise these protestors broke away and formed the New Mechanics' Institute, electing Rowland Detrosier president. Although it is not known for certain if Abel remained in the old Institute or joined the new one, his brother and business partner John was an important member of the new Institute's governing provisional committee. By 1834 the rebels were drawn back to the old Institute, after the flight of over one hundred members had forced them into the democratic reforms sought by the subscribers.

Despite these radical leanings, Abel's business prospered and he was able to be active in public life, becoming one of the Commissioners of Police, essentially a 180 strong town council, in 1836, having responsibility for paving and sanitation. In April 1840 he was again prosecuted for his publishing, this time for a blasphemy charge. Heywood presented an affidavit in extenuation, in which he declared that as soon as he had learned that the papers were blasphemous he withdrew them from sale. Having previously received fines and imprisonment on other charges, he was permitted to change his plea from not guilty to guilty in return for a suspended sentence. Pressed by the Government, the court decided to discharge him rather than press for judgment. Correspondence between Sir Charles Shaw, the Chief Commissioner of Police for Manchester, and the Home Office, have since revealed that Heywood had informed Shaw of a planned Chartist rising in Bolton on the night of 22/23 January 1840. In return, Shaw instructed the Government to pressure the court to let him off.

Despite this, Heywood remained an active Chartist, and his business published much of the reading material of the town's movement, including the Northern Star. He often used his wealth to bail out Chartists such as Feargus O'Connor, and in 1841 was elected treasurer of the National Charter Association, as well as sitting on the executive committee. At the same time he campaigned actively for the incorporation of the city and, once this was achieved, was elected to the council in 1843. His wider network included the Leeds-based publisher Alice Mann.

== Later publishing and political career as a Liberal ==
Heywood served as alderman in 1853 and in 1859 stood unsuccessfully as a Radical Liberal candidate for Manchester. His first term as mayor was in 1862–1863, during the cotton famine, and in 1865 he stood again as a Liberal for Manchester, again unsuccessfully. He would not repeat the attempt, instead becoming mayor again in 1876–1877. A major achievement was his role in guiding Manchester Town Hall to its completion.

Heywood & Son published An Up-To-Date Collection of Nigger Songs and Recitations in 1865. In 1866, Heywood noticed that working-class people were just beginning to use trains to travel for pleasure. Seeing no affordable travel guides, he began to publish a series of Penny Guides, short travel guides that covered such places as Buxton, Southport, Bath and the Isle of Wight. The first edition of A Guide to Bakewell and Haddon Hall was issued in 1893. By 1912, Heywood had about one hundred different guide pamphlets in publication.

The clock bell of the Town Hall, Great Abel, is named after Heywood and weighs 8 tons 2.5 cwt. It is inscribed with the initials AH and the Tennyson line Ring out the false, ring in the true.

== Family relationships ==
His wife was the widow of his predecessor Thomas Goadsby. John Heywood's business was continued by his son John and was still in existence in the 1970s. Abel Heywood also had a son Abel who continued his business. His eldest daughter, Jane, married Robert Trimble in 1856. The Trimble family emigrated to Taranaki in New Zealand in 1875.

Political offices
Preceded by Thomas Goadsby	Mayor of Manchester; 1862–1863; 1876–1877	Succeeded by John Marsland Bennett
Preceded by Matthew Curtis	Mayor of Manchester; 1862–1863; 1876–1877	Succeeded by Charles Sydney Grundy

== See also ==
- Heywood Guides

== Bibliography ==
- [Axon, W. E. A.] (1877) The Mayor of Manchester and his Slanderers
- Beetham, M. (2004) "Heywood, Abel (1810–1893)", Oxford Dictionary of National Biography, Oxford University Press, Retrieved 10 Aug 2008 (subscription, Wikipedia Library access or UK public library membership required)
- Boase, F. (1904) Modern English Biography
- Heywood, G. B. (1932) Abel Heywood, Abel Heywood & Son, Abel Heywood & Son Ltd, 1832–1932. Manchester
- [Johnson, Joseph] (1861) Clever Boys of our Time, and How they Became Famous Men
- Williams, Joanna M. (2017). Manchester's Radical Mayor: Abel Haywood, The Man who Built the Town Hall. The History Press. ISBN 978-0750984089.
