= In Your Pocket City Guides =

Publisher of guide books

UAB In Your Pocket
- Industry: Tourism
- Founded: December 1991; 34 years ago
- Headquarters: Vilnius, Lithuania
- Area served: Europe
- Products: Travel guides
- Website: www.inyourpocket.com

In Your Pocket City Guides is a publisher of free guide books for many European cities, available in print or electronically. It also publishes guide books for major events in Europe including the FIFA World Cup and the UEFA European Championship. It is based in Vilnius, Lithuania.
