= Heywood Guides =

Tourism in the United Kingdom

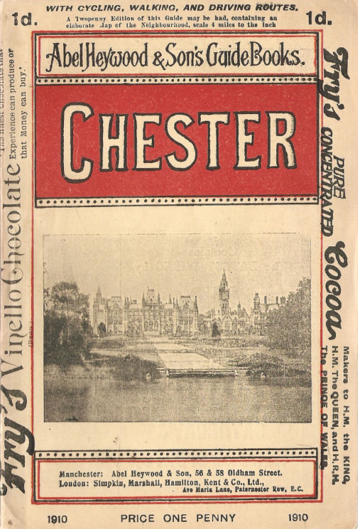
Heywood guide to Chester, 1910

Heywood's Guide was a series of travel guide books to England, Scotland, and Wales, published in the 1860s-1910s by Abel Heywood of Manchester.

== List of Heywood Guides by geographic coverage ==
=== England ===
- Guide to Hampton Court, Richmond, and Kew. Manchester: Abel Heywood & Son. 1883.

=== Wales ===
- North Wales. Manchester: Abel Heywood & Son. 1877.
- Abel Heywood & Son (1903), A guide to Bettws-y-Coed and Llanrwst with notices of Capel Curig, Trefriw, and Dolwyddelaf, Manchester, OCLC 13000127, OL 7051251M

== List of Heywood Guides A-Z ==
- Aberystwith
- Alderley Edge
- Alton Towers, Dove Dale &c.
- Bakewell and the Dales of the Wye
- Bala, North Wales
- Bangor and Beaumaris
- Barmouth and Harlech
- Bath
- Beddgelert
- Belle Vue Gardens, Manchester
- Birkenhead, New Brighton, &c.
- Birmingham
- Blackpool and Fleetwood
- Bournemouth
- Bridlington Quay
- Brighton
- Bristol and Clifton
- Buxton and Neighbourhood
- Carnarvon and Llanberis
- Castleton, Derbyshire
- Chatsworth and Haddon Hall
- Chester
- Coniston and Furness Abbey
- Dolgelly
- Douglas
- Dover
- Eastbourne
- Edinburgh
- Folkestone
- Grimsby and Cleethorpes
- Guernsey
- Harrogate and Neighljourhood
- Hastings
- Hayfield, Kinder Scout, and the Peak
- Ilkley, Bolton Abbey, &c.
- Ingleton
- Isle of Man
- Isle of Wight
- Jersey
- Kenilworth
- Keswick and Derwentwater
- Knaresborough
- Leamington
- Liverpool
- Llandudno
- Llangollen and Corwen
- Lliuirwst and Bettws-y-Coed
- Loch Lomond, Loch Katrine, and the Trossachs
- London
- Lytham and St. Anne's-on-the-Sea
- Malvern
- Manchester
- Margate
- Marple, Romiley, &c.
- Matlock Bath and Matlock Bank
- Morecambe and Neighbourhood
- Oxford
- Penmaenmawr and Conway
- Portsmouth
- Ramsey, Isle of Man
- Ramsgate
- Reading
- Redcar and Saltburn-by-the-Sea
- Rhyl, St. Asaph, Abergele, &c.
- Scarborough and Neighbourhood
- Snowdon and the Glyders
- Southampton
- Southend, Essex
- Southport
- Stratford-on-Avon
- Torquay
- Ulverston and Morceambe
- Warwick
- Weston-super-Mare
- Weymouth
- Whalley Abbey
- Whitby
- Windermere and Grasmere
- Worksop and Sherwood Forest
- York, its Antiquities, &c.
