= WordTravels =

Word Travels is a series of travel guides available on the internet. Originally launched in 2001, the guides were originally developed for use within travel agencies, offering travel consultants information on thousands of worldwide destinations. Word Travels makes most of its content available online, offering guides to more than 1000 worldwide destinations. A key feature of the site is the Word Travels Forum, where travelers questions get answered by travel professionals within each destination. The guides Word Travels produces are found on various airline, hotel and travel agency websites. The travel guides that Word Travels produces can be found as an iPhone app on Apple's App Store, and on the Kindle Store.

Word Travels is published by Globe Media Limited, a privately held company with offices in London and Cape Town. Globe Media also produces the Expat Arrivals city guides, which are used widely within the relocation industry and are relied upon as a source of information by their clients.
