= Slavutych =

City in Kyiv Oblast, Ukraine

Slavutych Славутич
- City
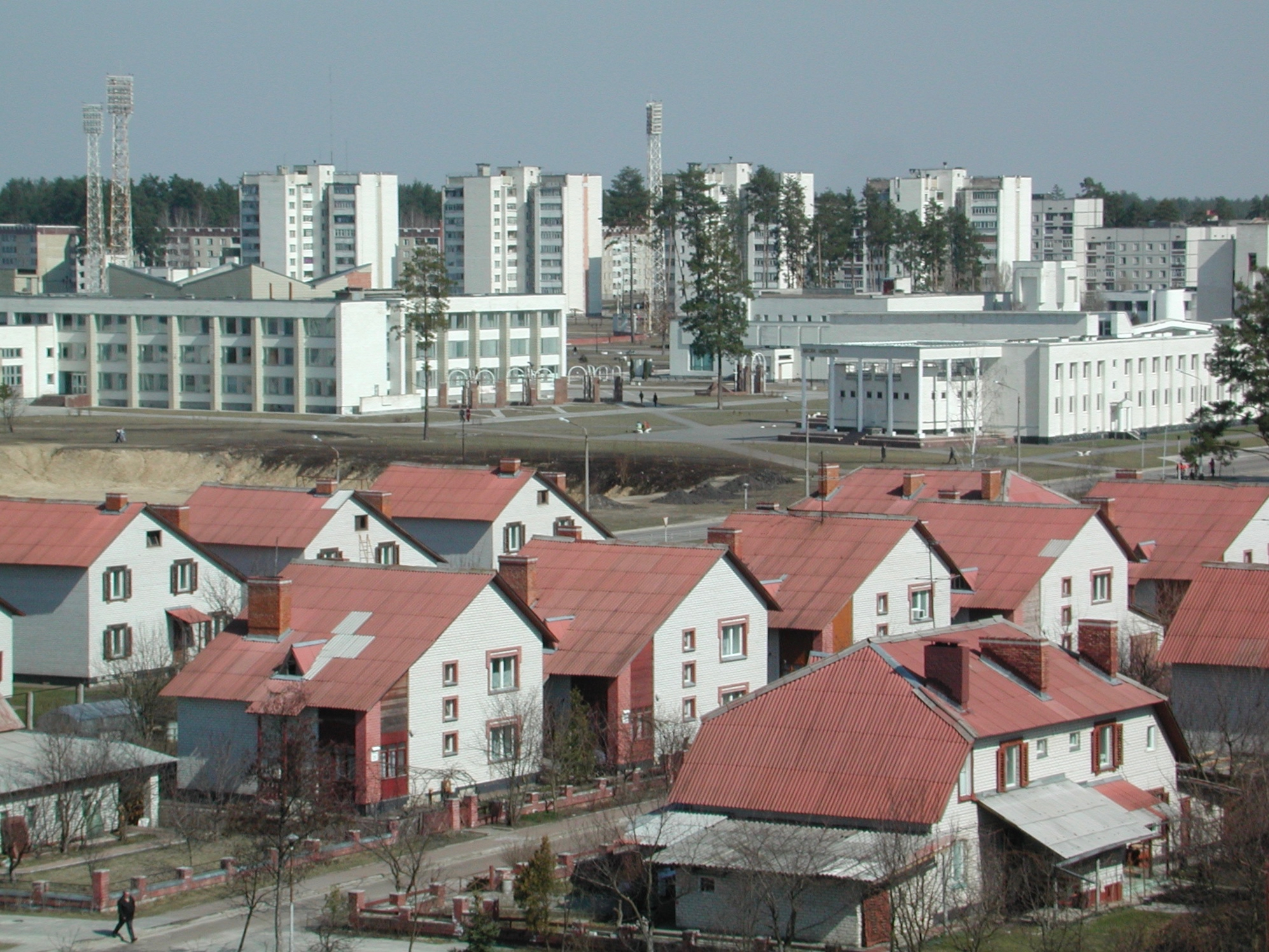
- One of Slavutych's residential areas

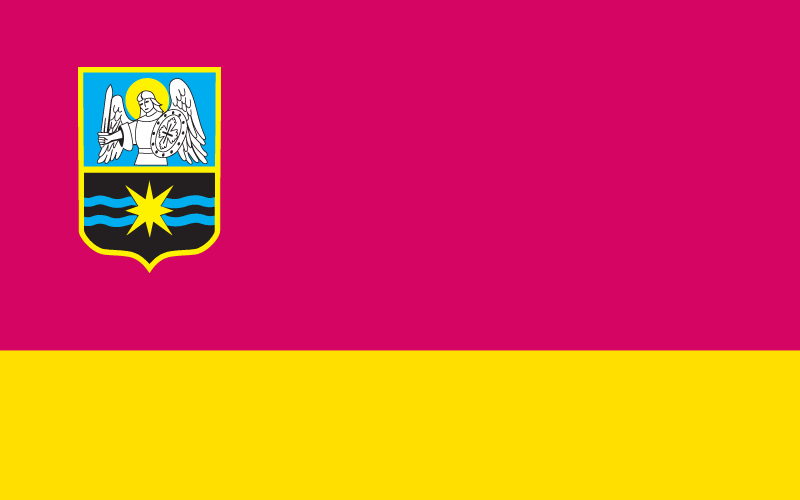
- Flag Coat of arms
- Interactive map of Slavutych
- Location of Slavutych in Ukraine Slavutych (Chernihiv Oblast) Slavutych (Ukraine)
- Coordinates: 51°31′14″N 30°45′25″E
- Country: Ukraine
- Oblast: Kyiv Oblast
- Raion: Vyshhorod Raion
- Hromada: Slavutych urban hromada
- Founded: 1986
- City rights: 1986

Government
  - Body: Slavutych City Council
  - Mayor: Yurii Fomichev

Area
  - Total: 2.53 km^{2} (0.98 sq mi)

Population (1 January 2022)
  - Total: 24,464
  - Density: 9,670/km^{2} (25,000/sq mi)
- Postal code: 07101
- Area code: +380 4579
- Website: e-slavutich.gov.ua

Slavutych (Ukrainian: Славутич, IPA: [slɐˈwutɪtʃ]) is a city and municipality in northern Ukraine, purpose-built for the evacuated personnel of the Chernobyl Nuclear Power Plant after the 1986 disaster that occurred near the city of Pripyat. Geographically located within Chernihiv Raion, Chernihiv Oblast, Slavutych is administratively subordinated to the Kyiv Oblast and is part of Vyshhorod Raion. It is coterminous with Slavutych urban hromada, one of the hromadas of Ukraine. In 2021 the city had a population of 24,464 (2022 estimate). In 2024, about 20,000 people lived in Slavutych.

== Geography ==
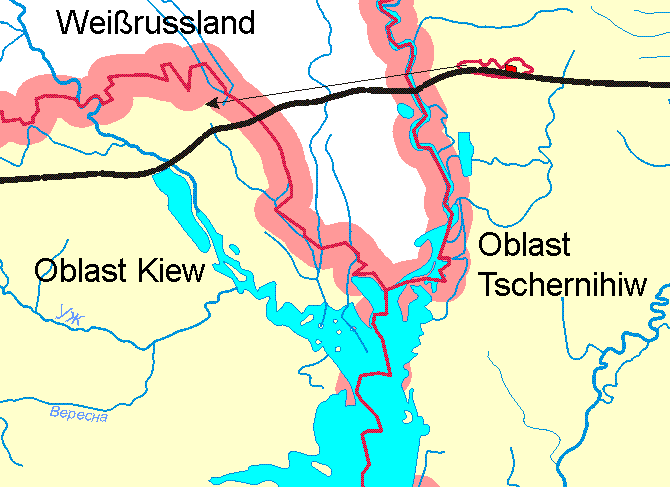
Transportation connection between Slavutych and Pripyat (map is in German)

Chernihiv Raion within Chernihiv Oblast. The non-shaded orange dot at the western edge of the raion indicates the city of Slavutych.

Slavutych is situated on the left bank of the Dnieper River, 40 kilometers (25 miles) from Chernihiv, 45 kilometers (30 miles) from the city of Pripyat, 50 kilometers (30 miles) from Chernobyl (both in Vyshhorod Raion) and 200 kilometers (100 miles) from Kyiv. While being geographically located in Chernihiv Raion (part of Chernihiv Oblast, until 2020 in Ripky Raion), administratively it belongs to Kyiv Oblast. It is an administrative exclave, that prior to 2020 did not belong to any raion. Prior to 2020 administrative reform the city was classified as a city of oblast significance. In 2020 Slavutych was downgraded to a city of district significance and made part of Vyshhorod Raion.

== History ==
Slavutych was named after the Old Slavic name for the Dnieper River. The city was built in 1986 shortly after the Chernobyl nuclear disaster, to provide homes for those who had worked at the Chernobyl nuclear power plant and their families. They were evacuated from the abandoned city of Pripyat. The economic and social situation of the city is still heavily influenced by the power plant and other Chernobyl zone installations. Many of the residents still work in the energy industry in the region.

In an interview with Pravda published on 10 October 1986, Erik Pozdyshev, the newly appointed Director of the Chernobyl nuclear power plant, officially announced that a new city was to be built. Construction of the town started shortly thereafter, and the first inhabitants settled in October 1988. The city was intended to replace Pripyat, which became a ghost town after it was evacuated thirty-six hours after the nuclear disaster, due to radioactive material. There is a memorial in Slavutych to remember the victims of the disaster, especially to those who lost their lives immediately after the event from radiation-related diseases.

The city is mostly home to survivors of the disaster who had to be relocated from the evacuation zone around the reactor, among them about 8,000 people who were children when the disaster occurred. Many inhabitants still work at the site of the former plant for monitoring, maintenance or scientific purposes. They commute to the zone on a regular basis. A rail line (twice crossing the international border with Belarus) runs directly from the city to the site of the plant.

Slavutych is located about 50 kilometers (30 miles) east of the former plant. The site had to be a reasonable distance away from the Chernobyl zone to ensure the risk of radiation-related illnesses was reduced. However, other factors that contributed to the choosing of the site were the availability of a nearby ready railroad infrastructure, and an accessible water supply from the nearby Dnieper River. To build the city, the ground was covered with a two-meter (6') layer of uncontaminated soil.

It is also the last city to be built by the USSR.

Until 18 July 2020, Slavutych was incorporated as a city of oblast significance. In July 2020, as part of the administrative reform of Ukraine, which reduced the number of raions of Kyiv Oblast to seven, the city of Slavutych was merged into Vyshhorod Raion.

During the Russian invasion of Ukraine, due to the siege of Chernihiv by Russian forces, the city of Slavutych was completely isolated from most of Ukraine by late February, leading to shortages of food and medicine. On 26 March 2022, following days of shelling, the Russian troops entered the city, seized a hospital and detained the mayor Yuri Fomichev, while locals took to the streets to protest the occupation.

Following the persistence of the protests when confronted with flashbang grenades and warning shots, the Russian forces agreed to leave Slavutych and release the mayor on the conditions that the Ukrainian military would not be present in the town and most weapons would be handed over to the mayor.

Following Russia's withdrawal over 5,000 of the city's 24,464 residents fled the city due to fears of another Russian attack on the city. On 26 April 2024, the city hosted a conference on the security situation for the entire Chernobyl exclusion zone and its surrounding areas. The conference was attended by President Volodymyr Zelenskyy, interior minister Ihor Klymenko, Commander of the National Guard of Ukraine Oleksandr Pivnenko, Head of the State Border Guard Service of Ukraine Serhii Deineko, the Head of the Main Directorate of the Security Service of Ukraine in Kyiv Artem Bondarenko, and Slavutych's mayor Yuriy Fomichev, as well as various other politicians and military officials. On 29 May 2024 Slavutych hosted the "Unbreakable Ukraine" interregional forum with the "Mayors for Economic Growth" demonstrating how the city dealt with the exodus of its population, and how the city's economy has rebounded, as a model for other cities in the region facing similar difficulties.

== Infrastructure ==
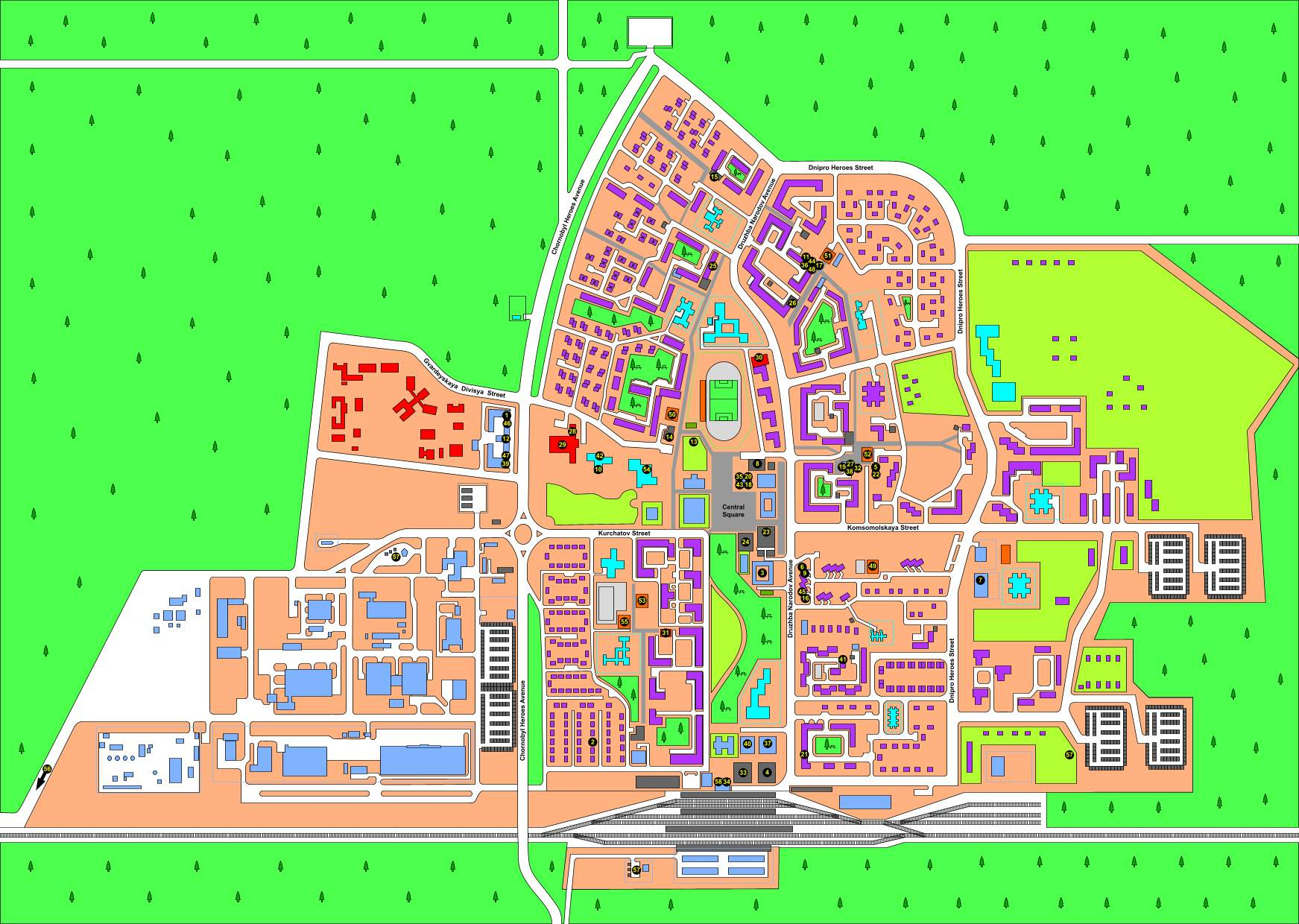
Plan of the city

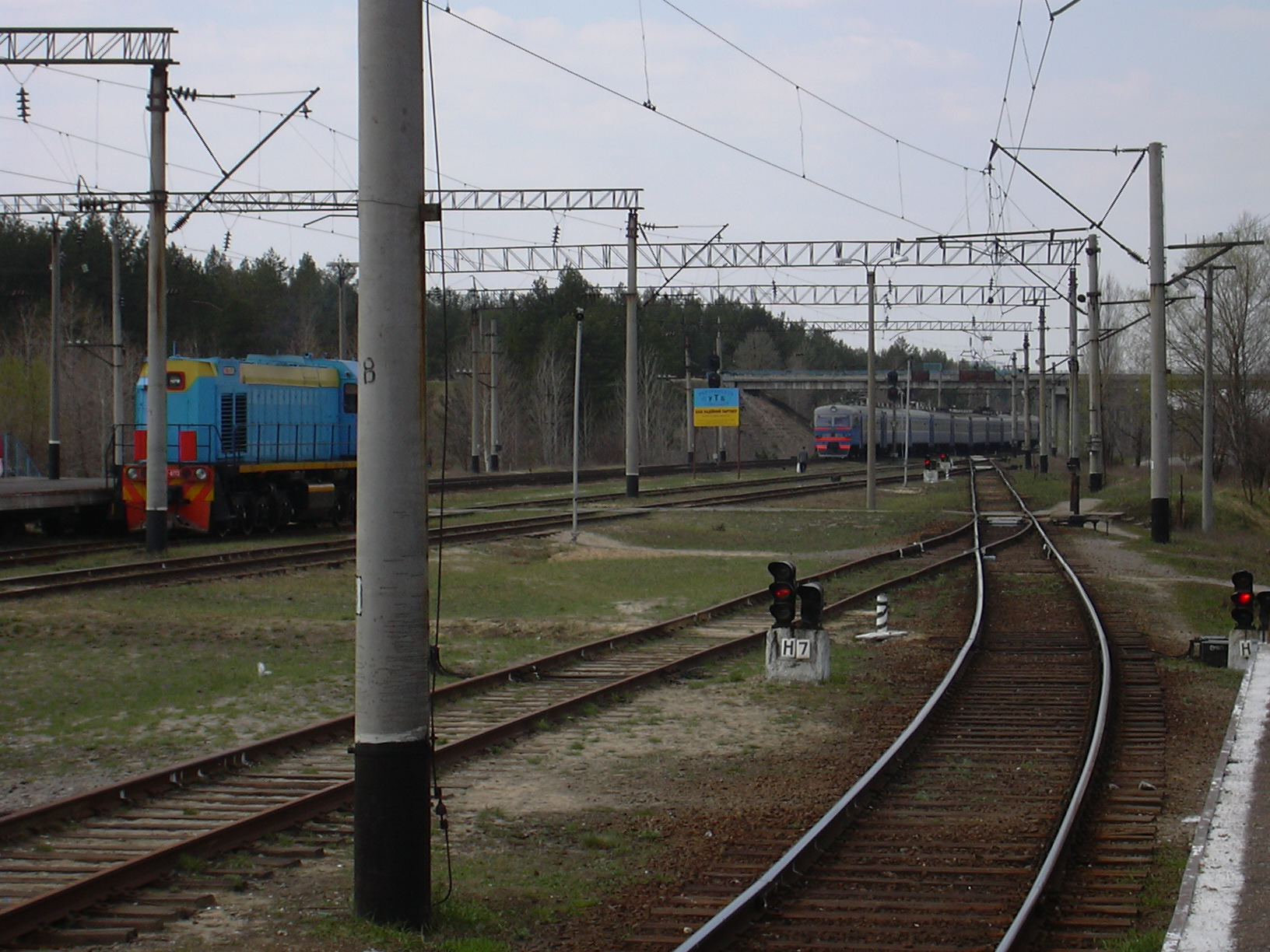
The railway lines at Slavutych station connecting it with the Chernobyl Exclusion Zone

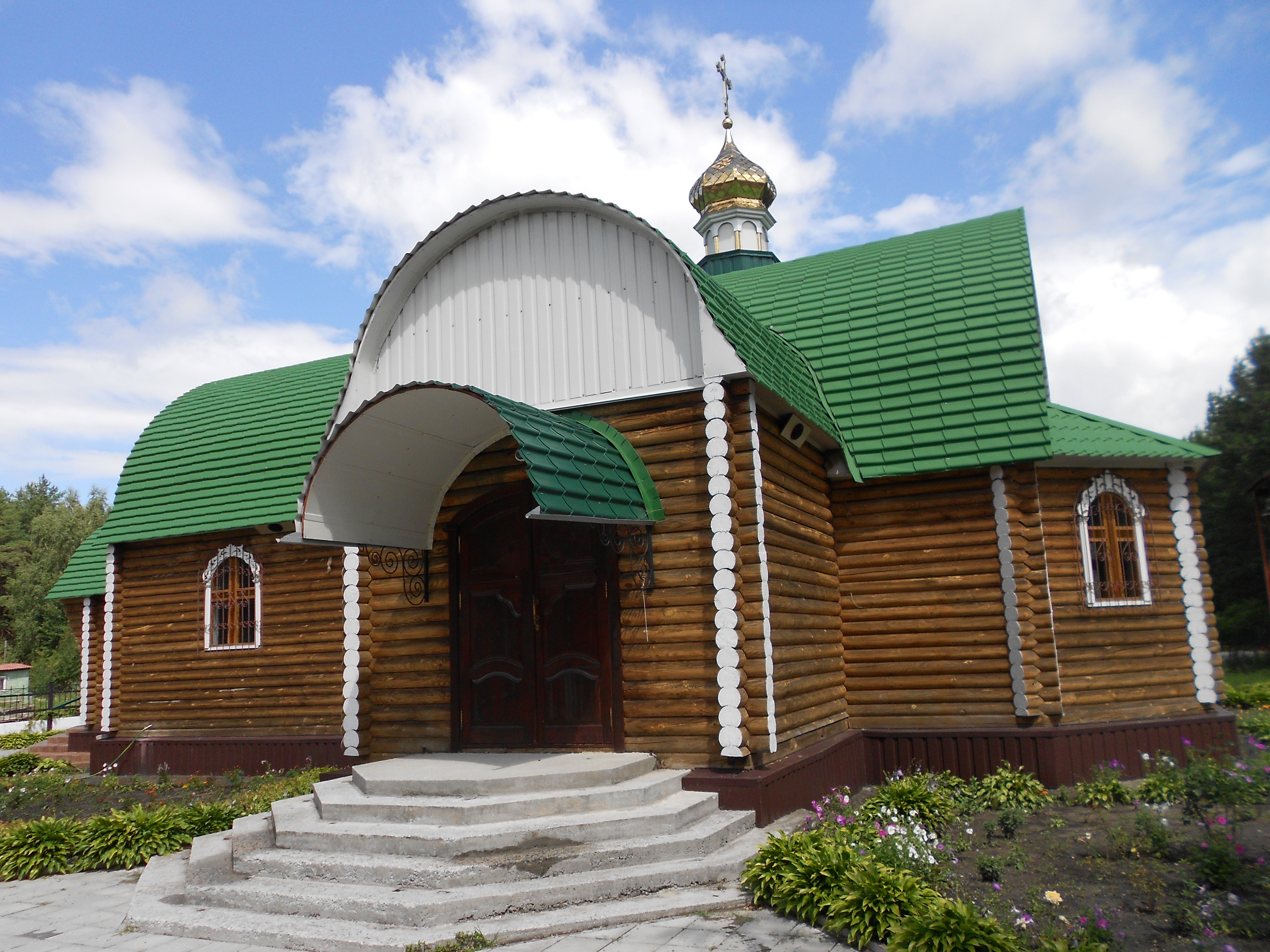
St. Elias church

From the start, Slavutych was planned to become a "21st century city". Compared to other cities in Ukraine, Slavutych has modern architecture with pleasant surroundings, and the standard of living in the city is much higher than in most other Ukrainian cities. During the construction of the city, workers and architects from eight former Soviet republics became involved: Armenian SSR, Azerbaijan SSR, Estonian SSR, Georgian SSR, Latvian SSR, Lithuanian SSR, Russian SFSR and Ukrainian SSR. As a result, the city is divided into eight districts originally named after the capitals of the contributing republics, each with its own unique style and atmosphere; some of these districts have been renamed to comply with decommunization and derussification laws. In addition, the city has a youth center, a modern community center, a town hall, an Internet café, numerous sports facilities, modern clinics, and a hotel. Around 80% of housing in the city is formed by apartments while the other 20% is formed by small, family houses.

The infrastructure and public facilities of the city were mostly funded by the company which operated the Chernobyl nuclear plant. Because the remaining units of the nuclear power plant were shut down in 2001, the city faces significant social problems and an uncertain future. Until 2001, approximately 9,000 people worked at the plant. Since the shutdown, this number has dropped to 3,000, most of them working on monitoring and maintenance. 85% of the city budget was funded by the operator of the plant. To support the settlement and establishment of new companies, Slavutych was declared a Special Economic Zone. In addition, substantial vocational retraining programs are provided by the government to improve the occupational outlook of those who lost jobs. Despite these efforts, about 1,500 people have already left the city, a trend which is predicted to continue for the foreseeable future.

== Culture ==
Slavutych has been the venue of numerous cultural activities since its foundation in 1989. Most recently, the 86 Film and Urbanism Festival, which ran six editions (2013–2018) and EASA/SESAM, which was due to take place in 2020, but was postponed to 2021 due to the COVID-19 pandemic.

The unique modernist architecture of the city remains one of its main attractions, as captured in the architectural guide Slavutych, by author Ievgeniia Gubkina.

== Demographics ==
The city has a high birth rate, as well as a low mortality. As a result, the average age in Slavutych is the lowest of any city in Ukraine. More than ⅓ of its inhabitants are children under 18.

Historical population
Year	Pop.	±%
1989	11,364	—
2001	24,402	+114.7%
2011	24,492	+0.4%
2012	24,726	+1.0%
2013	24,826	+0.4%
2014	25,112	+1.2%

=== Ethnic groups and languages ===
As of the 2001 Ukrainian census, the city had a population of 24,569 inhabitants. The majority of the population are ethnic Ukrainians, Russians and Belarusians make up significant minorities. In terms of spoken languages, a slim majority speaks Ukrainian as their primary language, while a significant minority speaks Russian. The exact ethnic and linguistic composition was as follows:

Ethnic groups in Slavutych
	percent
Ukrainians	63.26%
Russians	30.01%
Belarusians	4.07%
Armenians	0.54%
Tatars	0.29%
Azerbaijanis	0.21%
Moldovans	0.20%
Jews	0.11%
Poles	0.09%

First languages in Slavutych
	percent
Ukrainian	55.4%
Russian	42.4%
Belarusian	1.3%
Armenian	0.3%
Moldovan	0.1%
others	0.4%

== Transport ==
Slavutych has a railway station, and a minor stop in the locality of Poselok Lesnoi, on the Chernihiv–Ovruch line. It is served by a branch (Semenyahivka-Slavutych) of the regional highway P56 Chernihiv-Chernobyl, and by the provincial road T2506.

== Notable people ==
- Andriy Porokhnya football player
- Serhiy Rozhok (1985–2024), football player
- Ivan Dorn (born 1988), singer, actor

== See also ==
- FC Slavutych
