= Spotted by Locals =

Travel guide publisher

- City guides made by Locals
- Founded: 2008
- Founders: Bart van Poll & Sanne van Poll
- Country of origin: The Netherlands
- Key people: Jorn van der Eng
- Publication types: Mobile apps Blog
- Nonfiction topics: Travel guides Travel
- Owner: Marcel Beemsterboer
- No. of employees: 497 authors
- Official website: www.spottedbylocals.com

Spotted by Locals is a publisher of a series of travel guides (apps & blogs) with up-to-date tips curated by handpicked locals in over 80 cities in Europe, the Middle East and North America.

The city guides are curated by "Spotters", people who live in the city they write about and speak the local language. They recommend where to eat, shop, and be entertained.

Spotted by Locals has created content for publications such as The Guardian Sueddeutsche Zeitung, The Independent, De Volkskrant, Kathimerini and commercial content licensing partners like Volkswagen.

The website won website of the year in The Guardian and Observer Travel Awards 2010.
