= List of lord mayors of Manchester =

This is a list of the lord mayors of the City of Manchester in the North West of England. The position is not to be confused with the directly elected Greater Manchester mayor.

The current and 128th Lord mayor is Councillor Shaukat Ali (Labour), who has served in the role since May 2026, and was elected councillor for the Cheetham ward.

The lord mayor position is selected by a vote of councillors, and is a ceremonial role, with the holder attending civic events, promoting chosen causes and chairing meetings of Manchester City Council, while acting as a city Ambassador. The lord mayor’s term lasts for one year, and a new lord mayor is elected in a full council meeting, usually in May.

== History ==
Manchester was incorporated in 1838 under the Municipal Corporations Act 1835 as the Corporation of Manchester or Manchester Corporation. It achieved city status in 1853, only the second such grant since the Reformation. The area included in the city has been increased many times, in 1885 (Bradford, Harpurhey and Rusholme), 1890 (Blackley, Crumpsall, part of Droylsden, Kirkmanshulme, Moston, Newton Heath, Openshaw, and West Gorton), 1903 (Heaton), 1904 (Burnage, Chorlton cum Hardy, Didsbury, and Moss Side), 1909 (Gorton, and Levenshulme), 1931 (Wythenshawe: Baguley, Northenden, and Northen Etchells), and Ringway. A new town hall was opened in 1877 (by Alderman Abel Heywood) and the then-current and future mayors of Manchester were granted the title of Lord Mayor in 1893. Anthony Marshall was the last mayor and the first lord mayor.

In 1984, the city council – at that time controlled by the Labour party – voted to reduce the pomp and rate-payer cost associated with the position, changing the title to Chair of the Manchester City Council (often shortened), following the lead of some Greater London boroughs. This change dispensed with the elaborate robes and chain of office (a gilded ornament worn on the shoulders and around the neck), and no longer provided the traditional tax-funded, eight-room apartment for the officeholder to live in (instead opening this fancy traditional residence to the public as a tourist attraction). These changes were unpopular in the area, especially after focused agitation against them by the Manchester Evening News, which labelled them a political move originated by non-local leftist activists. The title Lord Mayor continued to be used frequently, especially outside the city council. The first of the three successive chairs of council was Kenneth Strath in the 1985–1986 term, and the last was Eileen Kelly, 1987–1988, Later officeholders were referred to again as lord mayors consistently, and permitted to use the traditional vestments associated with the office. Today, vestments have returned and the title Lord Mayor is used.

== Mayors of Manchester ==
=== 1838–1893 ===
No.	Mayor	Tenure began	Tenure ended	Terms	Notes
1	Sir Thomas Potter	1838	1840	2	Father of Sir John Potter, who was mayor 1848–1851
2	William Neild	1840	1842	2	
3	James Kershaw	1842	1843	1	
4	Alexander Kay	1843	1845	2	
5	William Benjamin Watkins	1845	1846	1	
6	Sir Elkanah Armitage	1846	1848	2	
7	Sir John Potter	1848	1851	3	Son of Sir Thomas Potter, who was mayor 1838–1840
8	Robert Barnes	1851	1853	2	
9	Benjamin Nicholls	1853	1855	2	
10	Sir James Watts	1855	1857	2	
11	Ivie Mackie	1857	1860	3	
12	Matthew Curtis	1860	1861	1	1st term
13	Thomas Goadsby	1861	1862	1	
14	Abel Heywood	1862	1863	1	1st term
15	John Marsland Bennett	1863	1865	2	
16	William Bowker	1865	1866	1	
17	Robert Neill	1866	1868	2	
18	John Grave	1868	1871	3	
19	William Booth	1871	1873	2	
20	Alfred Watkin	1873	1874	1	
21	John King	1874	1875	1	
22	Matthew Curtis	1875	1876	1	2nd term
23	Abel Heywood	1876	1877	1	2nd term
24	Charles Sydney Grundy	1877	1879	2	
25	Henry Patteson	1879	1880	1	
26	Sir Thomas Baker	1880	1882	2	
27	John Hopkinson	1882	1883	1	
28	Philip Goldschmidt	1883	1884	1	1st term
29	Sir John James Harwood	1884	1885	1	1st term
30	Philip Goldschmidt	1885	1886	1	2nd term
31	Matthew Curtis	1886	1887	1	3rd term
32	Sir John James Harwood	1887	1888	2	2nd term
33	William Batty	1888	1889	1	
34	Sir John Mark	1889	1891	2	First mayor of the County Borough
35	Sir Bosdin Thomas Leech	1891	1892	1	
36	Anthony Marshall	1892	1893	2	First term

== Lord mayors of Manchester ==
=== 19th century ===
No.	Lord mayor	Tenure began	Tenure ended	Term(s)	Notes
1	Sir Anthony Marshall	1893	1894	2	Second term; knighted at the opening of the Manchester Ship Canal on 21 May 1894
2	Abraham Evans Lloyd	1894	1896	2	
3	John Foulkes Roberts	1896	1897	1	
4	Robert Gibson	1897	1898	1	
5	Sir William Henry Vaudrey	1898	1899	1	
6	Thomas Briggs	1899	1901	2	Briggs was born in 1830 in Little Heaton, Prestwich. Son of James Briggs, manufacturer, Blackley, Manchester. Director Royal Exchange, Manchester.

=== 20th century ===
No.	Lord Mayor	Tenure Begin	Tenure End	Terms	Notes
7	Sir James Hoy	1901	1902	1	
8	John Royle	1902	1903	1	Liberal party
9	Sir Thomas Thornhill Shann	1903	1905	2	
10	James Herbert Thewlis	1905	1906	1	
11	John Harrop	1906	1907	1	
12	Sir Edward Holt	1907	1909	2	
13	Sir Charles Behrens	1909	1911	2	
14	Sir Samuel Walter Royse	1911	1913	2	
15	Sir Daniel McCabe	1913	1915	2	
16	Arthur George Copeland	1915	1916	1	
17	Sir Thomas Smethhurst	1916	1917	1	
18	Sir Alexander Porter	1917	1918	1	
19	John Makeague	1918	1919	1	
20	Sir William Kay	1919	1919	1	1st term
21	Tom Fox	1919	1920	1	
22	Sir William Kay	1920	1921	1	2nd term
23	Ernest Emil Darwin Simon	1921	1922	1	Knighted in 1932, created Baron Simon of Wythenshawe in 1947
24	Sir William Cundiff	1922	1923	1	
25	William Turner Jackson	1923	1924	1	
26	Sir Frederick Joseph West	1924	1925	1	
27	Sir Miles Ewart Mitchell	1925	1926	1	
28	James Henry Swales	1926	1927	1	
29	Sir William Davy	1927	1928	1	
30	Lt-Col George Westcott	1928	1929	1	
31	Sir Robert Noton Barclay	1929	1930	1	
32	George Frank Titt	1930	1931	1	
33	Ellis Green	1931	1932	1	
34	Sir William Walker	1932	1933	1	
35	Joseph Binns	1933	1934	1	
36	Samuel Woollam	1934	1935	1	
37	Thomas Stone Williams	1935	1936	1	
38	Joseph Toole	1936	1937	1	
39	Joseph Crookes Grime	1937	1938	1	
40	Sir William Kay	1938	1938	1	3rd term
41	Elijah John Hart	1938	1939	1	
42	George Harold White	1939	1940	1	
43	Robert Griffith Edwards	1940	1941	1	
44	Wright Robinson	1941	1942	1	
45	John Septimus Hill	1942	1943	1	
46	Leonard Bramwell Cox	1943	1944	1	
47	William Philip Jackson	1944	1945	1	
48	Hugh Lee	1945	1946	1	Father of Hugh Lee, who was Lord Mayor 1981–1982
49	Thomas Henry Adams	1946	1947	1	
50	Dame Mary Latchford Kingsmill Jones	1947	1949	2	First woman to hold the office
51	Robert Moss	1949	1950	1	
52	Colonel Samuel Percy Dawson	1950	1951	1	
53	William Collingson	1951	1952	1	
54	Douglas Gosling	1952	1953	1	
55	Abraham Moss	1953	1954	1	
56	Sir Richard Harper	1954	1955	1	
57	Tom Regan	1955	1956	1	
58	Harry Sharp	1956	1957	1	
59	Sir Leslie Lever MP	1957	1958	1	Created Baron Lever in 1975.
60	James Edward Fitzsimons	1958	1959	1	
61	Harold Quinney	1959	1960	1	
62	Arthur Donovan	1960	1961	1	
63	Sir Lionel Biggs	1961	1962	1	
64	Robert E. Thomas	1962	1963	1	
65	Robert Carr Rogers	1963	1964	1	
66	Dr William Chadwick	1964	1965	1	
67	Bernard Sydney Langton	1965	1966	1	
68	Nellie Beer	1966	1967	1	Conservative.
69	Dame Elizabeth Yarwood	1967	1968	1	
70	Harold Stockdale	1968	1969	1	
71	Neil Gowanloch Westbrook	1969	1970	1	
72	William Atkinson Downward	1970	1971	1	
73	Douglas John Edwards	1971	1972	1	
74	Edward Grant	1972	1973	1	
75	Kenneth Collis	1973	1974	1	Opened T1 Manchester Airport and also given an OBE in 1992
76	Frederick Balcombe	1974	1975	1	First lord mayor of the Metropolitan Borough
77	Dame Kathleen Ollerenshaw	1975	1976	1	
78	Kenneth Franklin	1976	1977	1	
79	Robert Crawford	1977	1978	1	
80	Trevor Thomas	1978	1979	1	
81	G.W.G. Fitzsimons	1979	1980	1	
82	Winnie Smith	1980	1981	1	
83	Hugh Lee	1981	1982	1	Son of Hugh Lee, (who was Lord Mayor 1945–1946)
84	Clifford Tomlinson	1982	1983	1	
85	Dr M. J. Taylor	1983	1984	1	Son of Joe Taylor, founder and first chairman of the Greater Manchester Council
86	Harold Tucker	1984	1985	1	The last Conservative to date to serve as Lord Mayor of Manchester.
87	Kenneth Strath	1985	1986	1	First chair of the council
88	Kathleen Robinson	1986	1987	1	
89	Eileen Kelly	1987	1988	1	Last chair of the council
90	Patricia Conquest	1988	1989	1	
91	Yomi Mambu	1989	1990	1	
92	John Gilmore	1990	1991	1	
93	George Chadwick	1991	1992	1	
94	Bill Egerton	1992	1993	1	
95	William T Risby	1993	1994	1	
96	Sheila Smith	1994	1995	1	
97	Joyce Keller	1995	1996	1	
98	Derek Shaw	1996	1997	1	
99	Gerry Carroll	1997	1998	1	
100	Gordon Conquest	1998	1999	1	
101	Tony Burns	1999	2000	1	

=== 21st century ===
No.	Lord mayor	Tenure began	Tenure ended	Notes	Refs
102	Hugh Barrett	2000	2001		
103	John Smith	2001	2002		
104	Roy Walters	2002	2003		
105	Audrey Jones	2003	2004		
106	Tom O'Callaghan	2004	2005		
107	Mohammed Afzal Khan	2005	17 May 2006		
108	James Ashley	17 May 2006	12 August 2006	Liberal Democrat, Died in office.	
109	David Sandiford	11 October 2006	16 May 2007		
110	Glynn Evans	16 May 2007	14 May 2008		
111	Mavis Smitheman	14 May 2008	13 May 2009		
112	Alison Firth	13 May 2009	19 May 2010		
113	Mark Hackett	19 May 2010	18 May 2011		
114	Harry Lyons	18 May 2011	19 May 2012		
115	Elaine Boyes	19 May 2012	19 May 2013		
116	Naeem ul Hassan	19 May 2013	17 May 2014		
117	Susan Cooley	17 May 2014	18 May 2015		
118	Paul Murphy	17 May 2015	17 May 2016		
119	Carl Austin-Behan	13 May 2016	17 May 2017		
120	Eddy Newman	17 May 2017	16 May 2018		
121	June Hitchen	16 May 2018	15 May 2019		
122	Abid Latif Chohan	15 May 2019	27 October 2020		
123	Tommy Judge	27 October 2020	18 May 2022		
124	Donna Ludford	18 May 2022	17 May 2023		
125	Yasmine Dar	17 May 2023	15 May 2024	First Asian woman to hold the mayoralty	
126	Paul Andrews	15 May 2024	14 May 2025		
127	Carmine Grimshaw	14 May 2025	20 May 2026		
128	Shaukat Ali	20 May 2026	incumbent		

== See also ==
- List of mayors of Manchester, New Hampshire
- Mayor of Greater Manchester, England
