= Matthew Curtis (mayor) =

British industrialist and politician

Matthew Curtis (1807–1887) was an industrialist and civic leader in Manchester. He was Mayor of Manchester three times and elected to membership of the Manchester Literary and Philosophical Society on 18 April 1843.

== Life ==
Born in Manchester in 1807, Curtis was initially apprenticed to the firm of Joseph Chessborough Dyer, subsequently becoming foreman, and then succeeding in 1836 to the ownership of Dyer's business, which became Curtis, Parr & Walton. By trade, Curtis was a wire-card manufacturer and a machine-maker. He was a partner in two businesses: Curtis, Parr & Walton, wire-card makers (with James Walton), and Parr, Curtis & Madely, machine-makers. These firms were involved in the manufacture of equipment for spinning cotton, the former in the production of Dyer's Frame and the latter producing Smith & Orr's Self-Acting Mule. By the middle of the nineteenth century, Curtis's firms were the largest manufacturers of cotton-spinning machinery in Britain.

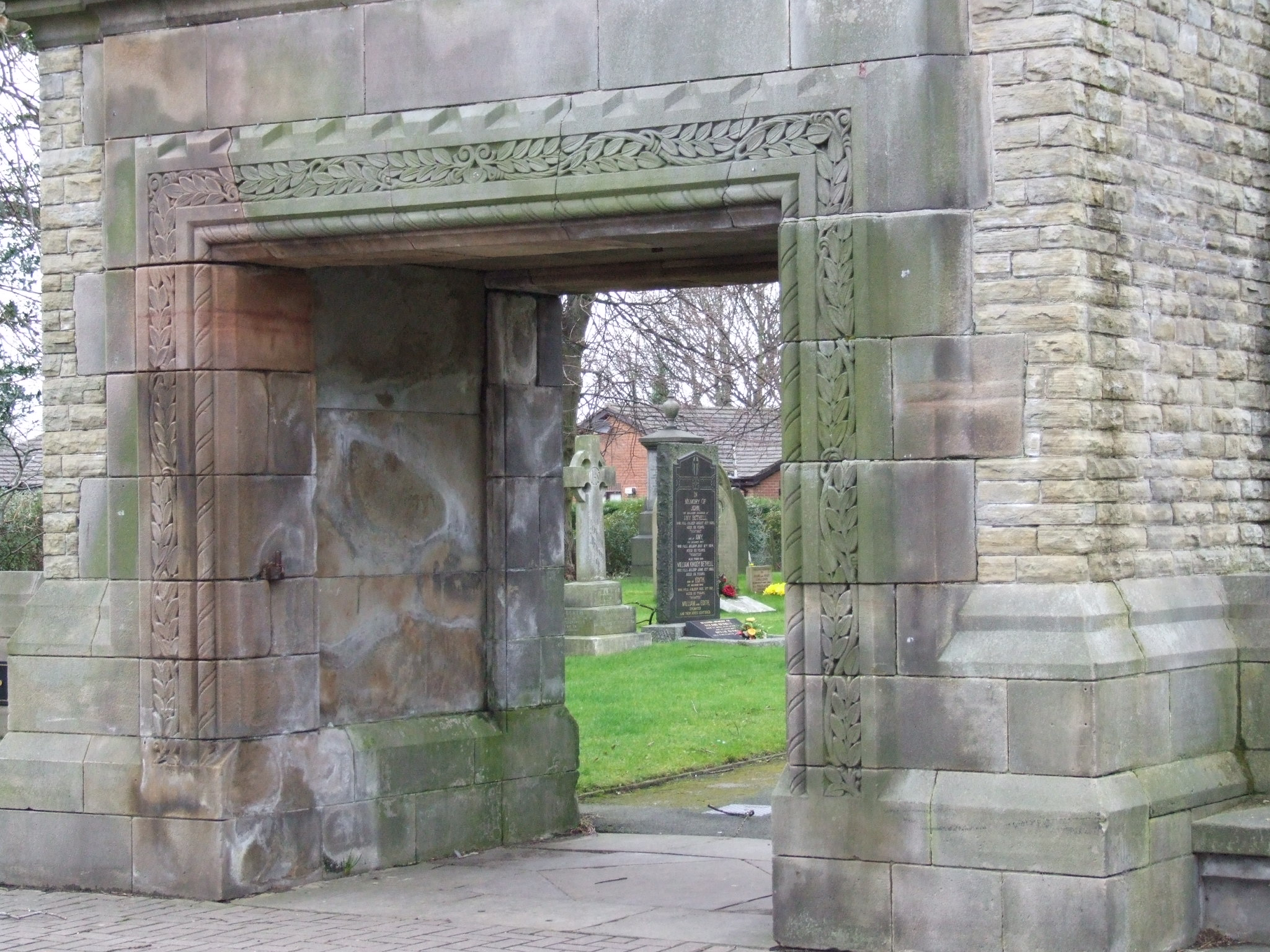
The lych gate of St John's Church, Heaton Mersey, showing what little can still be made out of the memorial inscription to Matthew Curtis

In December 1875, during his second term as Mayor of Manchester, Curtis put in place the copper ball on the summit of the Albert Square tower of the new Manchester Town Hall, which was nearing its completion in 1877. Curtis was a council member of the Manchester Anti-Corn Law Association and a founding director of the Manchester Athenaeum. He resided at Thornfield in Heaton Mersey, south of the city, and died on 9 June 1887 or 11 June 1887, during his third term as Mayor.

== Marriages and children ==
Curtis married twice:

- Firstly to Amelia Weaver (1810–1877), daughter of Richard Weaver of Tarvin in Cheshire, by whom he had 2 sons and 1 daughter, including:
  - John Curtis (1836–1878), eldest son, who predeceased his father, leaving 3 sons including the youngest Walter Septimus Curtis (born 1871) lord of the manor of Denbury in Devon, a barrister of Lincoln's Inn. One of Walter's daughters was Lettice Curtis (1915–2014) an aviator, flight test engineer, air racing pilot, and sportswoman.
  - Richard Curtis, 2nd son;
- Secondly he married Charlotte Laughton (1824–1918), 5th daughter of Edmund Laughton of Tickhill, Yorkshire.

The lych gate (1927) of St John's Church, Heaton Mersey carries an inscription, much faded, dedicated to Curtis and other, later members of the Curtis family.

Political offices
| Preceded by Ivie Mackie | Mayor of Manchester (1st Term); 1860–1861 | Succeeded by Thomas Goadsby |
| Preceded by John King | Mayor of Manchester (2nd Term); 1875–1876 | Succeeded by Abel Heywood |
| Preceded by Philip Goldschmidt | Mayor of Manchester (3rd Term); 1886–1887 | Succeeded by Sir John James Harwood |
