= DOM publishers =

German publishing company

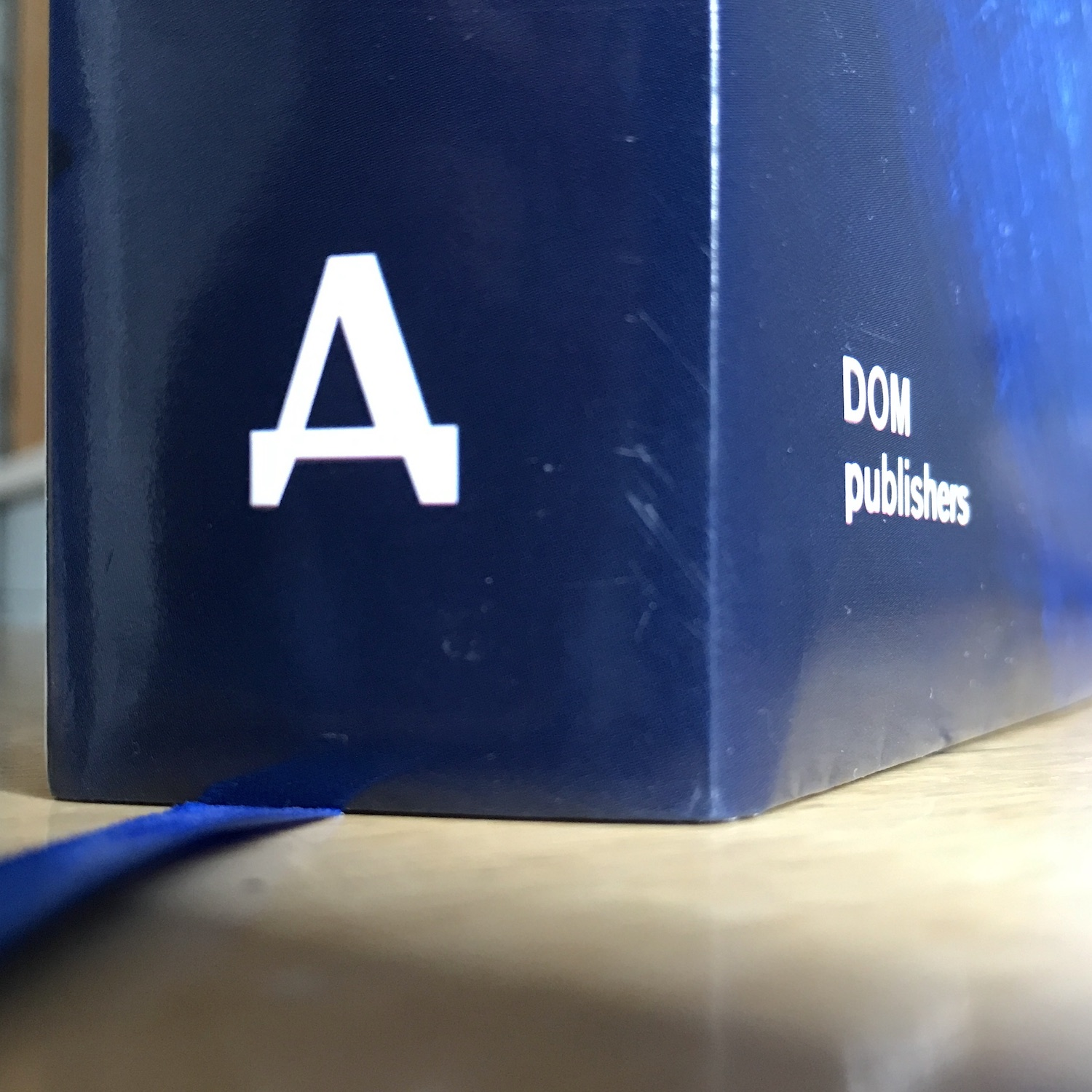
- Book by DOM publishers, showing the Cyrillic 'd' Logo
- Founded: 2005
- Founder: Philipp Meuser and Natascha Meuser
- Country of origin: Germany
- Headquarters location: Berlin
- Publication types: Books, Architectural Guides, Photobooks
- Nonfiction topics: architecture, urban planning, design
- Owners: Philipp Meuser and Natascha Meuser
- Official website: www.dom-publishers.com

DOM publishers, founded in Berlin in 2005, publishes architectural guides and specialist publications on architecture, urban planning, and design within an international context. The publishing house is owned and managed by Philipp Meuser and Natascha Meuser, who are also practising architects at their firm, Meuser Architekten. It releases around 40 books per year.

== Profile ==
In addition to individual publications, the company publishes various series: Manuals, Basics, and Architectural Guides. Its unique selling point is that it releases books on architecture in regions that normally fall outside the scope of public discussion – in particular on the history of architecture in the territory of the former Soviet Union. This interest in the East is reflected in the company's logo, a Cyrillic 'd' for DOM.

The publishing house's owner-manager Phillip Meuser has authored several publications with an Eastern focus, such as a monograph on the female architect of the Soviet space programme, Galina Balashova. He co-edited a comprehensive study of the Moscow Metro.

DOM publishers' titles have also garnered praise in design publications. For instance, Decommunized: Ukrainian Soviet Mosaics, Day VII-Architecture: A Catalogue of Polish Churches Post 1945, and the Construction and Design Manual Zoo Buildings.

Since 2017 the yearbook for the German Architecture Museum (Deutsches Architekturmuseum, DAM) in Frankfurt am Main has also been published by the company.

== Accolades and awards ==
The Architectural Guides series, which received an Iconic Award from the German Design Council in 2014, have also attracted attention in the media. The two-volume guide to Pyongyang has been featured in the German, British, and American press.

In 2018, Urbanity and Density in 20th Century Urban Design, received the prize for the most innovative book in planning history written in English and based on original new research from the International Planning History Society (IPHS).

In 2017, Architecture in Archives: The Collection of the Akademie der Künste, was among the winners of the German Architecture Museum's Architectural Book Award.

Also in 2017, at the ITB Berlin Book Awards, the publishing house received special recognition for its Architectural Guide series, in particular for the guides to the United Arab Emirates, Berlin, New York City, and Saint Petersburg.

In 2020, DOM publishers won the German Publishing Prize for its "valuable contribution to the debate on contemporary architecture and urban development". The jury was impressed by the publishing house's "practically oriented and pertinent" Manuals, its "monographs on international architectural history" and the Architectural Guide series, which covers more than 100 cities worldwide. The award was announced by the German Minister for Culture and Media on 25 May 2020.
