= Women in government =

Share of women in parliament

In many countries, women have been underrepresented in the government and different institutions. As of 2026, women were still underrepresented in most countries, but were increasingly being elected to be heads of state and government.

As of 2026, women are heads of state in 28 countries and 27.4% of members of parliament; they make up a smaller percentage of cabinet ministers (22%) than in 2024. In 2019, the global participation rate of women in national-level parliaments was 24.5%. In 2013, women accounted for 8% of all national leaders and 2% of all presidential posts. Furthermore, 75% of all female prime ministers and presidents took office in the two decades prior to 2016.

Women may face a number of challenges that affect their ability to participate in political life and become political leaders. Several countries explored measures that could increase women's participation in government at all levels, from the local to the national and international. Political parties advocating for women can be categorized as either gender egalitarian or gender essentialist.

== Women in government office ==
Map showing countries which since independence have had (counting governors-general as heads of state, but excluding monarchs): Female head of government (Note: Although the Peruvian constitution and the government itself state that the president is the head of government, other sources name the president of the Council of Ministers as the head of government.) Female head of state (Note: Including female representatives of heads of state, such as governors-general and French representatives of Andorra) Female head of state/government (combined) (Note: Heads of government of constitutional monarchies without a vice-regal representative are included.) Female head of state and female head of government Female prime minister/state counselor acting as deputy to the combined head of state and government (de facto leader) Three former sovereign states (East Germany, Tannu Tuva, and Yugoslavia) have also had a female Head of State or Head of Government

Women have been notably in fewer numbers in the executive branch of government. The gender gap has been closing, however, albeit slowly, and they are still underrepresented.

=== Current heads of state or government ===
The following women leaders are currently head of state or the head of their nation's government:

Date term began	Title of office	Name	Country
10 August 1983	Queen mother	Ntfombi of Eswatini	Eswatini
25 May 2018	Prime minister	Mia Mottley	Barbados
16 December 2018	President	Salome Zourabichvili (Note: The presidency has been disputed between Zourabichvili and Mikheil Kavelashvili since 29 December 2024, with all Georgian institutions asserting her term has ended, while Zourabichvili, her supporters and significant parts of the international community asserting that she continues to be the legitimate president.)	Georgia
27 June 2019	Prime minister	Mette Frederiksen	Denmark
24 December 2020	President	Maia Sandu	Moldova
19 March 2021	President	Samia Suluhu Hassan	Tanzania
25 July 2022	President	Droupadi Murmu	India
22 October 2022	Prime minister	Giorgia Meloni	Italy
16 November 2022	Member of the presidency	Željka Cvijanović	Bosnia and Herzegovina
27 September 2023	Prime minister	Evika Siliņa	Latvia
23 December 2022	President	Nataša Pirc Musar	Slovenia
25 January 2023	Chairwoman of the Council of Ministers	Borjana Krišto	Bosnia and Herzegovina
20 March 2023	President	Christine Kangaloo	Trinidad and Tobago
3 January 2024	President	Hilda Heine	Marshall Islands
1 April 2024	Prime minister	Judith Suminwa	DR Congo
4 April 2024	President	Myriam Spiteli Debono	Malta
12 May 2024	President	Gordana Siljanovska-Davkova	North Macedonia
1 August 2024	President	Halla Tomasdottir	Iceland
24 September 2024	Prime Minister	Harini Amarasuriya	Sri Lanka
1 October 2024	President	Claudia Sheinbaum	Mexico
21 December 2024	Prime minister	Kristrun Frostadottir	Iceland
2 October 2023	President	Sylvanie Burton	Dominica
18 February 2025	Co-President	Rosario Murillo	Nicaragua
1 March 2025	President of the Pontifical Commission	Raffaella Petrini	Vatican City
21 March 2025	President	Netumbo Nandi-Ndaitwah	Namibia
21 March 2025	Prime minister	Sara Zaafarani	Tunisia
10 April 2025	Prime minister	Brigitte Haas	Liechtenstein
1 May 2025	Prime Minister	Kamla Persad-Bissessarg	Trinidad & Tobago
16 July 2025	President	Jennifer Geerlings-Simons	Suriname
21 October 2025	Prime minister	Sanae Takaichi	Japan
11 November 2025	President	Catherine Connolly	Ireland
23 January 2026	President	Iliana Iotova	Bulgaria
4 April 2026	President	Albulena Haxhiu	Kosovo
8 May 2026	President	Laura Fernández	Costa Rica

=== Historic firsts as head of state or government ===
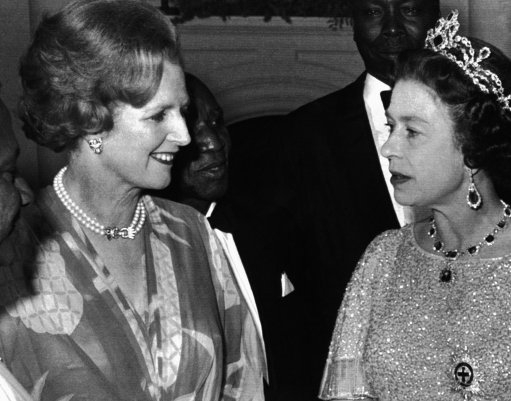
Queen Elizabeth II and Prime Minister Margaret Thatcher of the United Kingdom in 1979

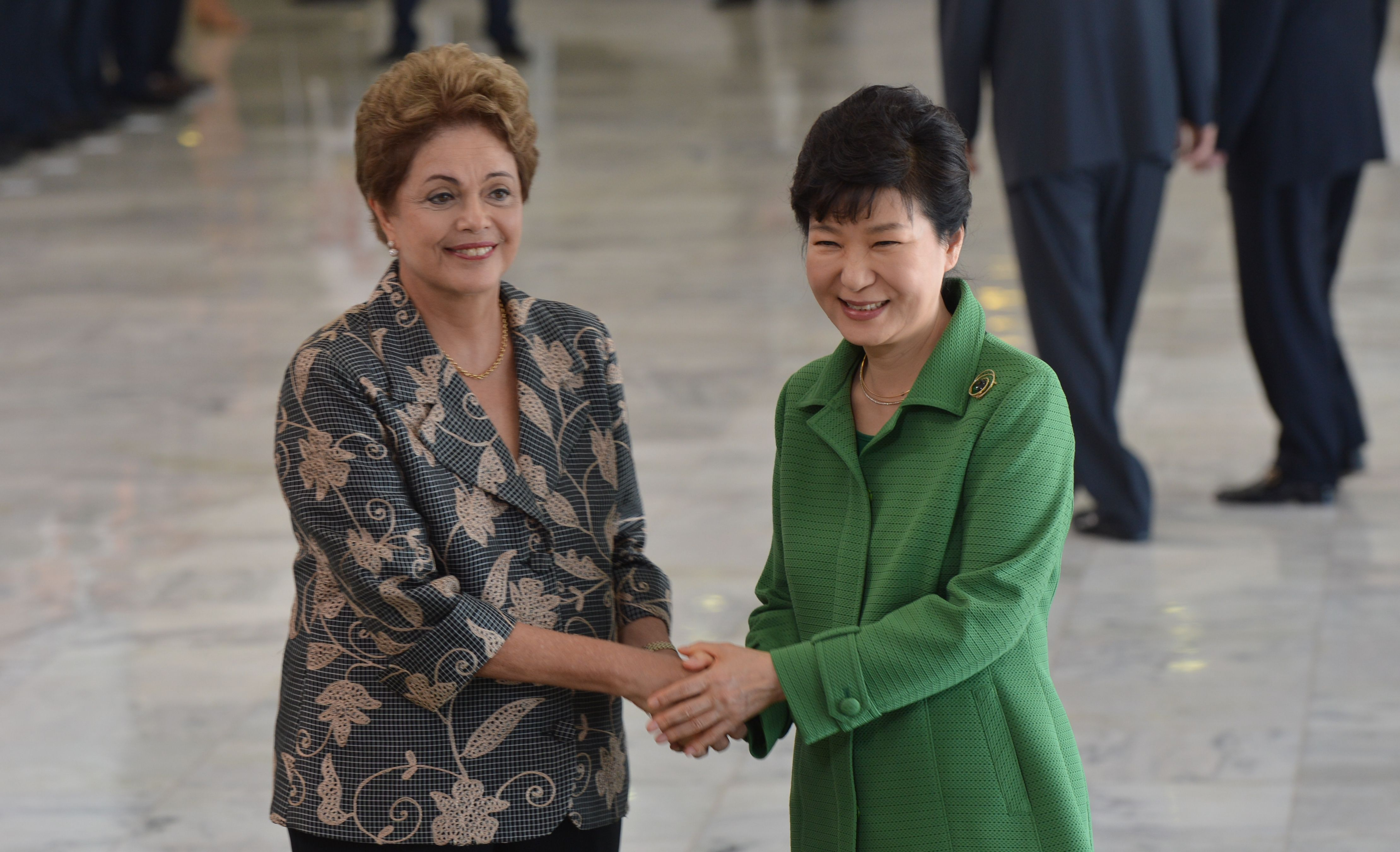
Brazilian president Dilma Rousseff and South Korean president Park Geun-hye in 2015

The socialist revolutions taking place during World War I saw the first few women become members of governments. The first government organization formed with the goal of women's equality was the Zhenotdel, in Soviet Russia in the 1920s. Yevgenia Bosch held the position of Minister of Interior and Acting Leader of the People's Secretariat of Ukraine, one of a number of competing ruling bodies in the Ukrainian People's Republic, the predecessor of Soviet Ukraine (it proclaimed its from the Russian Soviet Republic on 25 January 1918). She is sometimes considered the first modern woman leader of a national government.

The first women, other than female hereditary rulers, to hold head of state positions were in socialist countries. Khertek Anchimaa-Toka led the Tuvan People's Republic, a little recognized state that is today part of Russia, from 1940 to 1944. Sükhbaataryn Yanjmaa was acting leader of the Mongolian People's Republic 1953–1954 and Soong Ching-ling was acting co-chair of the People's Republic of China from 1968 to 1972 and again in 1981.

The first democratically elected female prime minister (head of government) of a sovereign country was Sirimavo Bandaranaike of Ceylon (now Sri Lanka) in 1960–1965. She served again in 1970–77 and 1994–2000; a total of 17 years. Other early elected female prime ministers were Indira Gandhi of India (1966–1977; she served again 1980–1984), Golda Meir of Israel (1969–1974) and Margaret Thatcher of the United Kingdom (1979–1990). Angela Merkel of Germany is the longest (continuously) serving elected female head of government (2005–2021). (Note: Second longest when considering non-consecutive terms, after the Sri Lankan leader, Sirimavo Bandaranaike.)

The first woman to hold the title of "president", as opposed to a queen or prime minister, was Isabel Perón of Argentina (appointed head of state and government, 1974–76). The world's first elected female president was Vigdís Finnbogadóttir of Iceland, whose term lasted from 1980 to 1996. She is the longest-serving elected female head of state of any country to date. Corazon Aquino, President of the Philippines (1986–1992), was the first woman president in Southeast Asia.

Benazir Bhutto, prime minister of Pakistan (1988–1990), was the first female prime minister of a Muslim-majority country. She served again from 1993–96. The second was Khaleda Zia (1991–1996) of Bangladesh. Tansu Çiller of Turkey was the first elected Muslim female prime minister in Europe (1993–1996).

Elisabeth Domitien was appointed prime minister of the Central African Republic (1975–1976). Carmen Pereira of Guinea-Bissau (1984) and Sylvie Kinigi of Burundi (1993) acted as head of state for 2 days and 101 days respectively. Ruth Perry of Liberia was the first appointed female head of state in Africa (1996–1997). Ten years later, Ellen Johnson Sirleaf of Liberia was Africa's first elected female head of state (2006–2018).

Sri Lanka was the first nation to have a female president, Chandrika Kumaratunga (1994–2000), and a female prime minister (her mother, Sirimavo Bandaranaike) simultaneously. Mary McAleese's election as president of Ireland (1997–2011) was the first time that a female president directly succeeded another female president, Mary Robinson. Jóhanna Sigurðardóttir, prime minister of Iceland (2009–2013), was the world's first openly lesbian world leader, and the first female world leader to wed a same-sex partner while in office.

The first woman to be appointed President of the European Commission was Ursula von der Leyen in 2019.

Elizabeth II, head of state of the United Kingdom and Commonwealth realms from 1952 to 2022, is the longest-serving female head of state and longest-reigning queen regnant in world history.

When Barbados became a republic in November 2021, it became the first nation to have a woman as its first president, Sandra Mason (2021–2025).

Sushila Karki is a former chief justice of Nepal and the first woman to hold that office, serving from 11 July 2016 to 6 June 2017. In September 2025, she became that country's first female prime minister.

=== Cabinet ministers ===
Sofia Panina was the world's first Deputy Minister of State Welfare and Vice Minister of Education in Russia in 1917. Alexandra Kollontai became the first female to hold a ministerial position, as the People's Commissar for Social Welfare in Soviet Russia in October 1917. Yevgenia Bosch held the position of Minister of Interior and Acting Leader of the People's Secretariat of Ukraine from December 1917 to March 1918. The Countess Markievicz was Minister of Labour in the Irish Republic from 1919 to 1922.

The world's first female cabinet minister in an internationally recognized government was Nina Bang, Danish Minister of Education from 1924 to 1926. Miina Sillanpää was Second Minister of Social Affairs in Finland from 1926 to 1927. Margaret Bondfield was Minister of Labour in the United Kingdom from 1929 to 1931; she was the first female cabinet minister and first female member of the Privy Council of the United Kingdom. Dolgor Puntsag was the world's first female Minister of Health in Mongolia in 1930. The first woman to hold the position of finance minister was Varvara Yakovleva, the People's Commissar for Finance of the Soviet Union from 1930 to 1937. Frances Perkins, Secretary of Labor from 1933 to 1945, was the first woman to hold a cabinet position in the United States federal government. Azerbaijan appointed the first female justice minister, Ayna Sultanova, in 1938. Ana Pauker of Romania was the first woman to be a foreign minister in 1947, a position she held for four years. Qian Ying of China was the first female interior minister from 1959 to 1960. The position of defence minister was first held by a woman, Sirimavo Bandaranaike of Ceylon, from 1960 to 1965.

While women's representation as ministers grew through the 20th century, women holding the most senior cabinet posts was relatively rare until the 21st century. In recent years, women have increasingly held the top profile portfolios for their governments in non-traditional areas for women in government, such as foreign relations, defense and national security, and finance or revenue.

Kamala Harris is the first woman to serve as Vice President of the United States, making her the highest ranking female politician in US history. Janet Yellen is the first woman to serve as the U.S. Secretary of the Treasury having previously been chair of the Federal Reserve and chair of the White House Council of Economic Advisers.

=== First women governors and chief ministers ===
Yevgenia Bosch, the Bolshevik military leader, held the People's Secretary of Internal Affairs position in the Ukraine People's Republic from 1917 to 1918, part of the Russian Soviet Republic.

Nellie Ross was the first woman to be sworn in as governor of a U.S. state (Wyoming) in January 1925, followed later that month by Miriam A. Ferguson in Texas.

Louise Schroeder was the first female member of the Weimar National Assembly. After the division of Germany following World War II, she served as governing mayor of West Berlin from 1948 to 1951.

Sucheta Kripalani was India's first woman Chief Minister, serving as the head of the Uttar Pradesh government from 1963 to 1967.

Savka Dabčević-Kučar, of the Socialist Republic of Croatia (1967–1969), was the first female premier of a non-sovereign European constituent state. She held the position of Chairman of the Executive Council (Prime Minister) of Croatia when it was a constituent republic of Socialist Federal Republic of Yugoslavia.

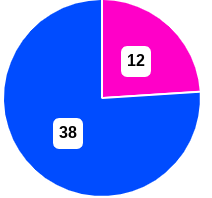
United States Governors (Pie chart)

Griselda Álvarez was the first female governor in Mexico, serving as governor of the state of Colima from 1979 to 1985.

Carrie Lam became the first female Chief Executive of Hong Kong in 2017 and before that was Chief Secretary for Administration from 2012.

Claudia Sheinbaum in 2018 became the first female mayor of Mexico City, serving in the role until 2023. She was elected the first female president of Mexico in 2024.

== Worldwide status of women's representation in government ==
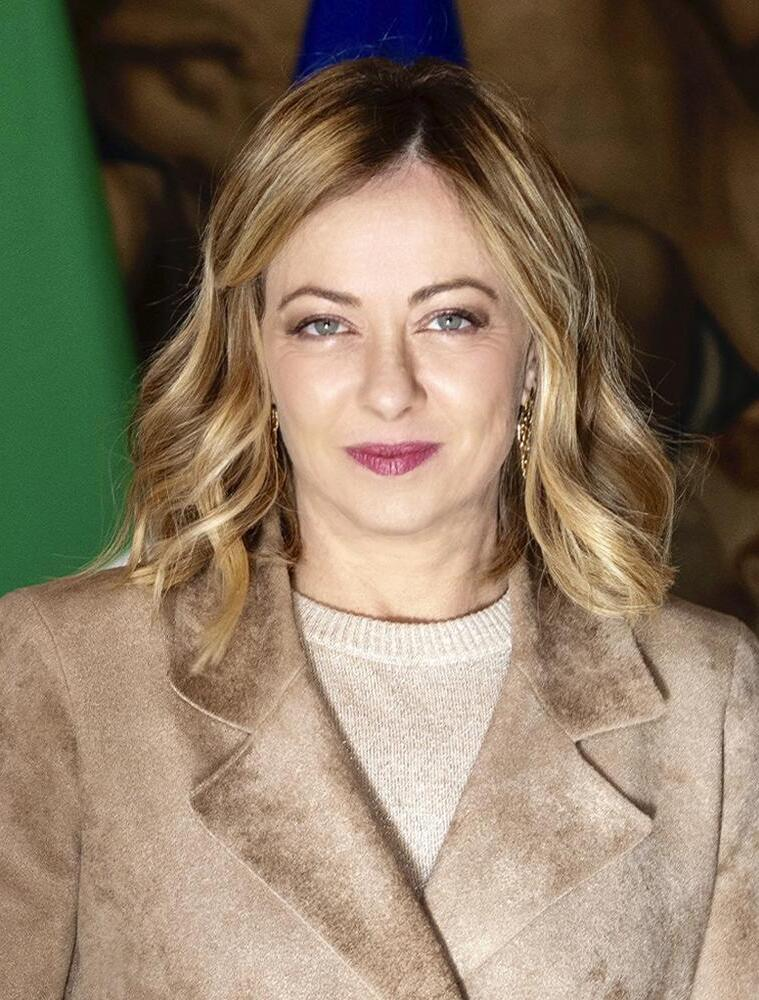
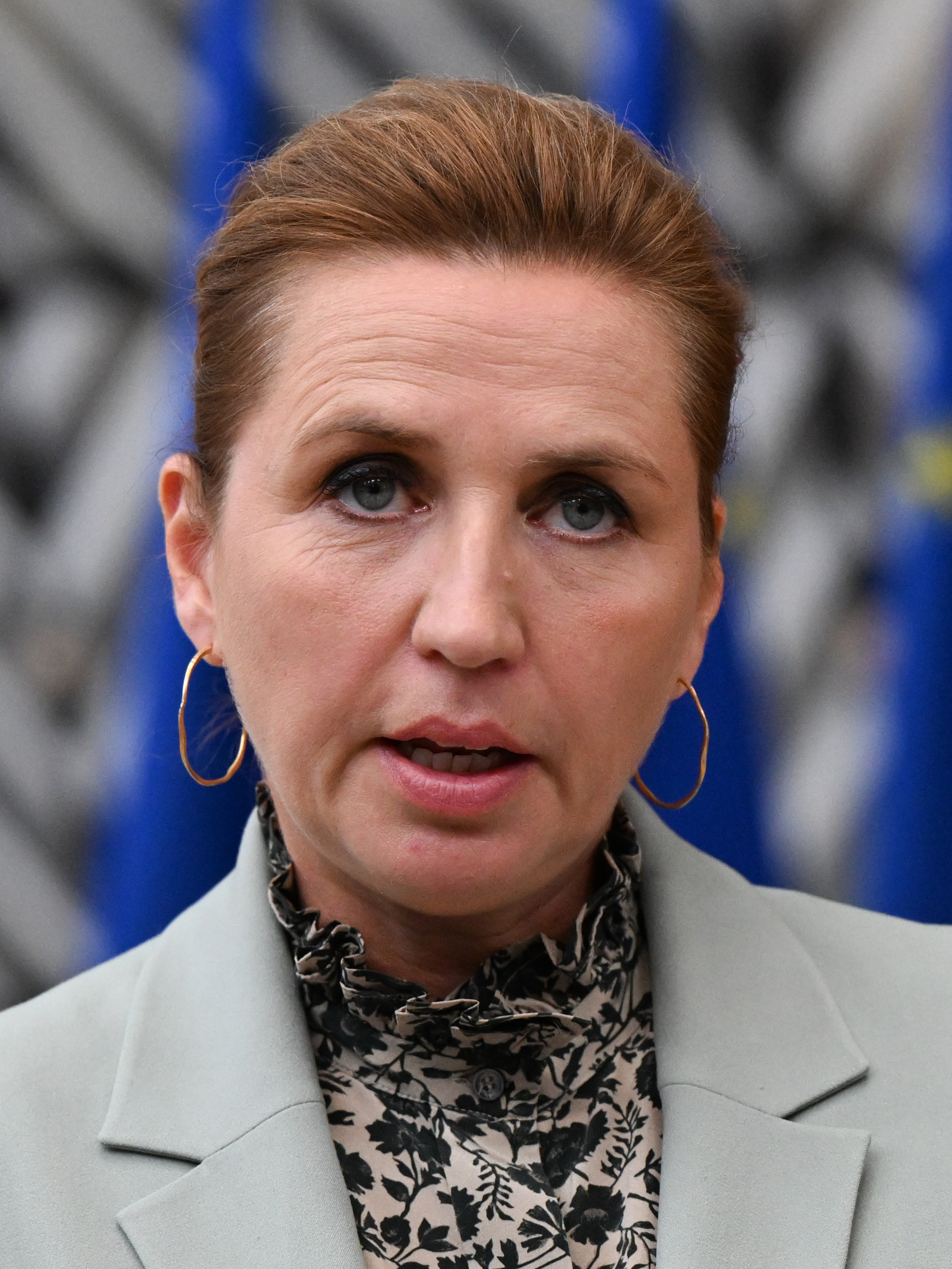
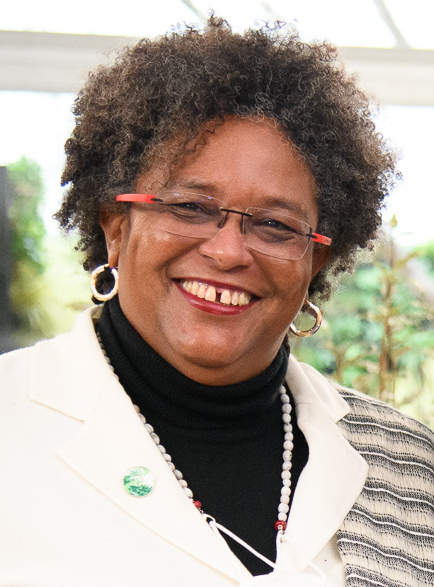
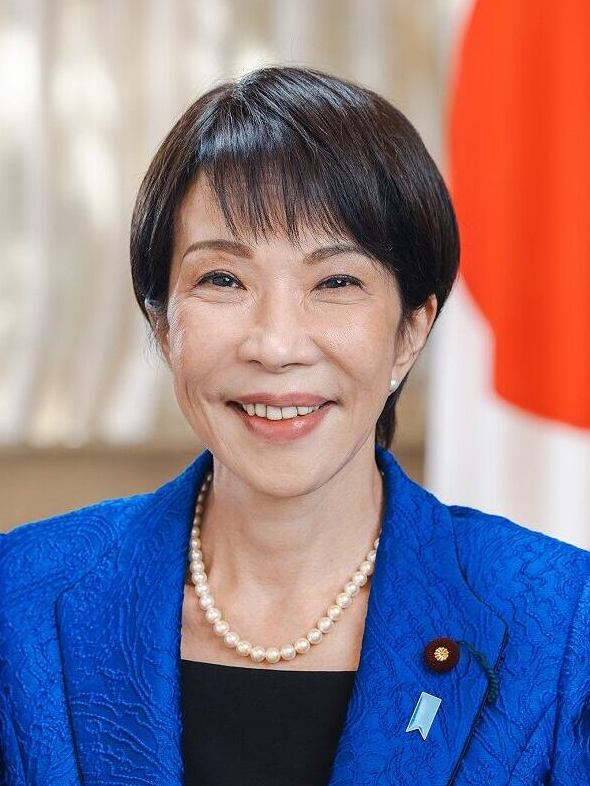
Current executive heads of government:
- Giorgia Meloni, Prime Minister of Italy
- Mette Frederiksen, Prime Minister of Denmark
- Mia Mottley, Prime Minister of Barbados
- Sanae Takaichi, Prime Minister of Japan
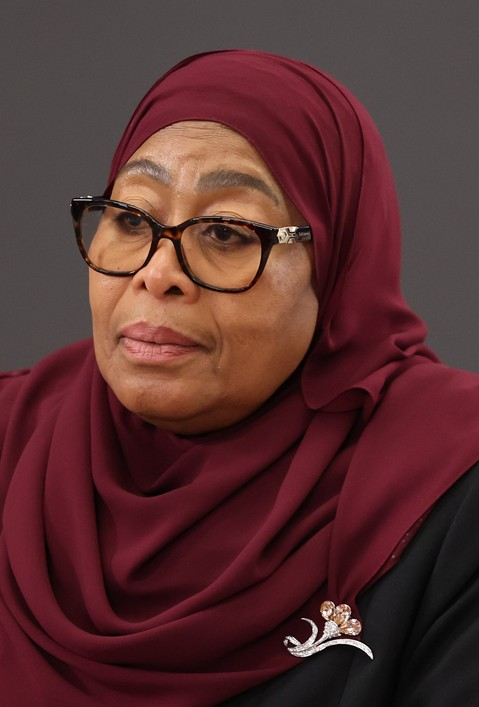
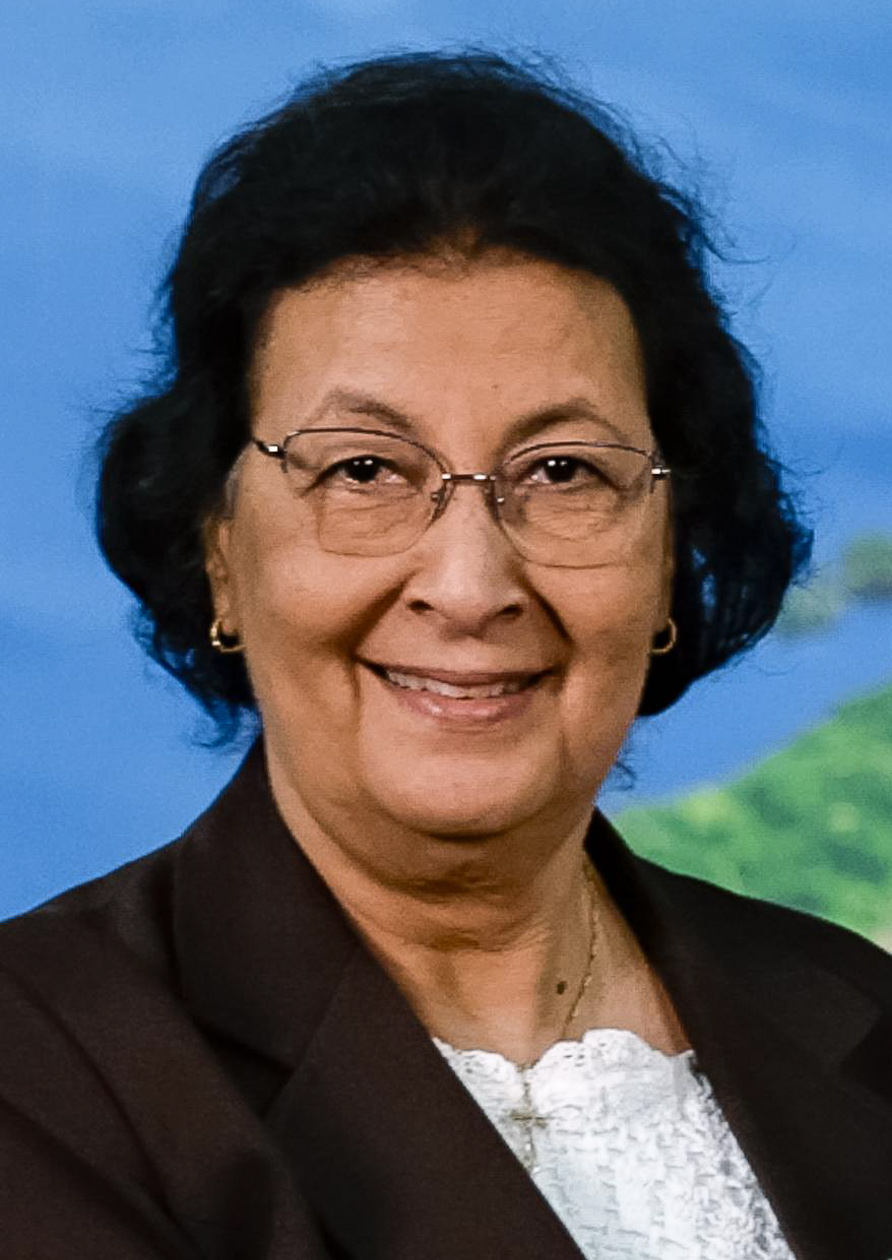
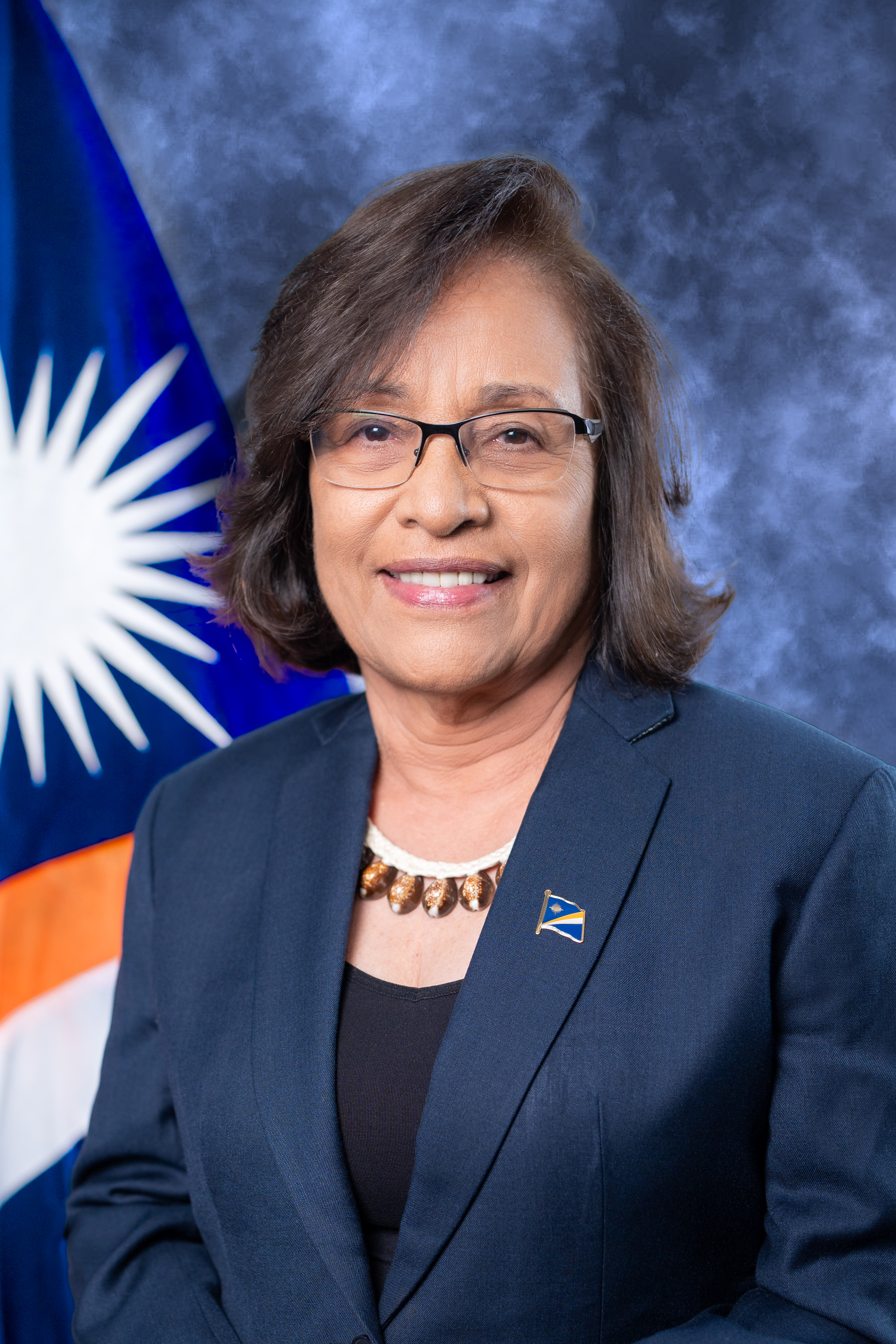
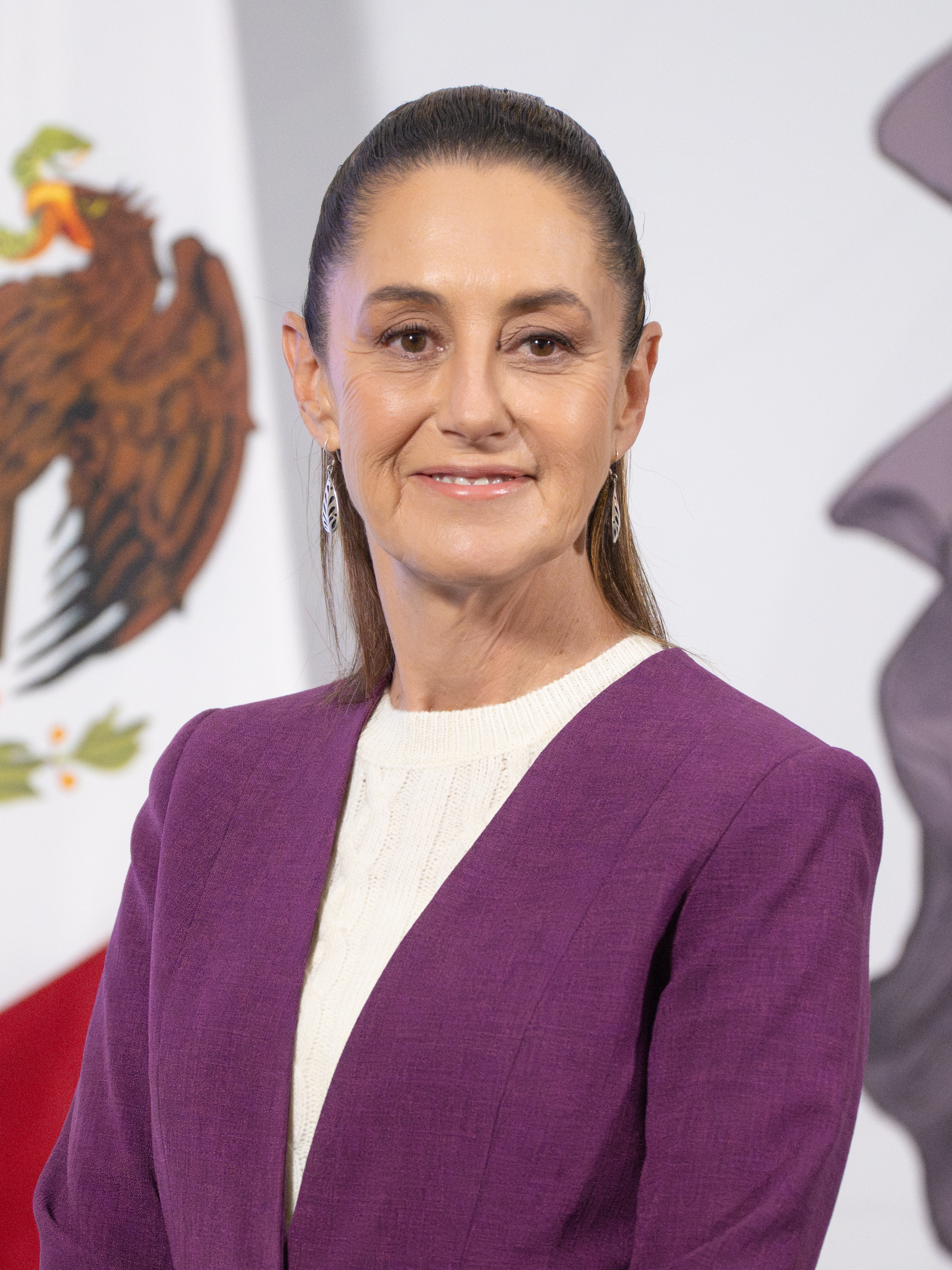
Current heads of state and government:
- Samia Suluhu Hassan, President of Tanzania
- Jennifer Geerlings-Simons, President of Suriname
- Hilda Heine, President of the Marshall Islands
- Claudia Sheinbaum, President of Mexico

=== Presidents and prime ministers ===
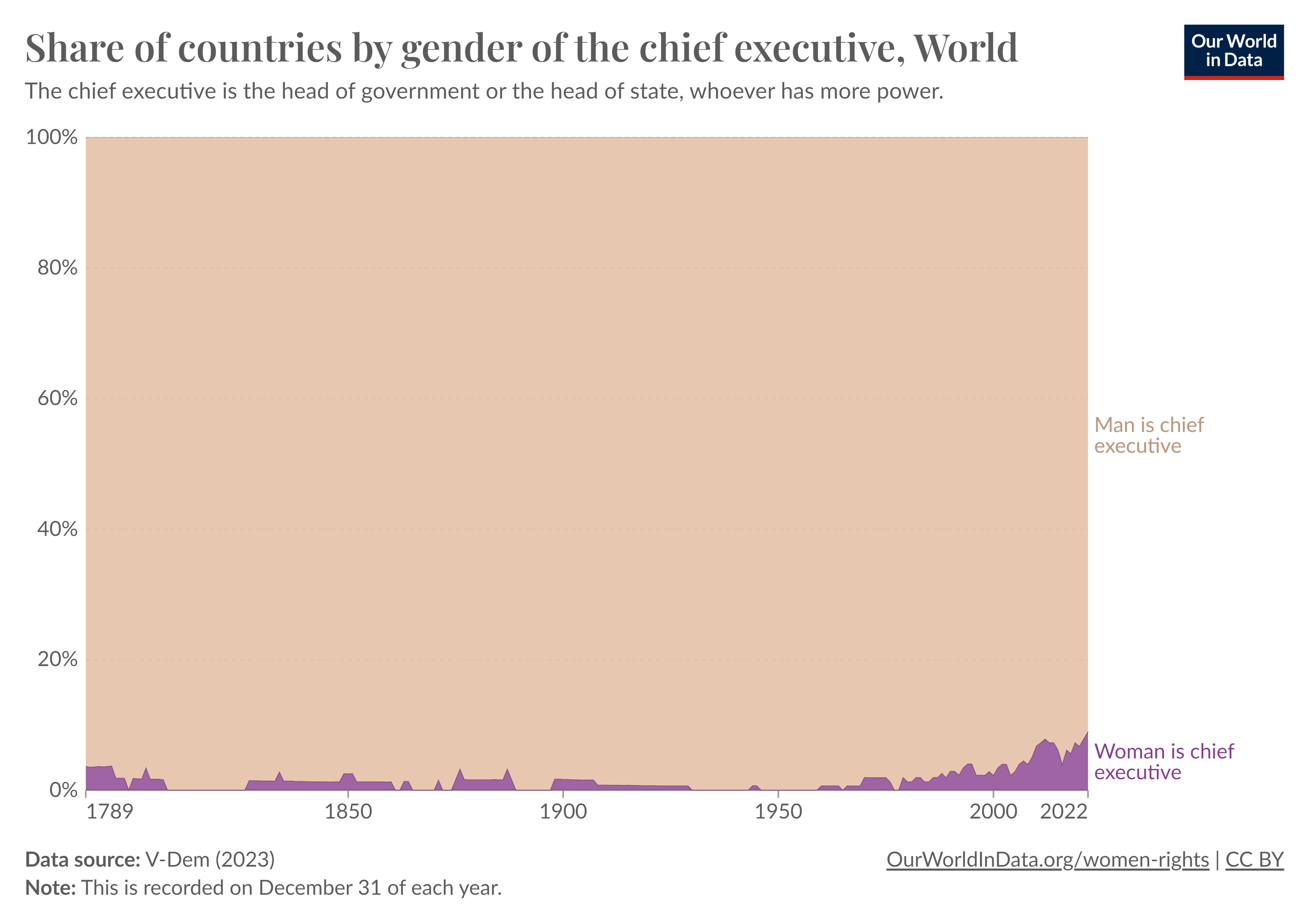
Share of countries by gender of the chief executive

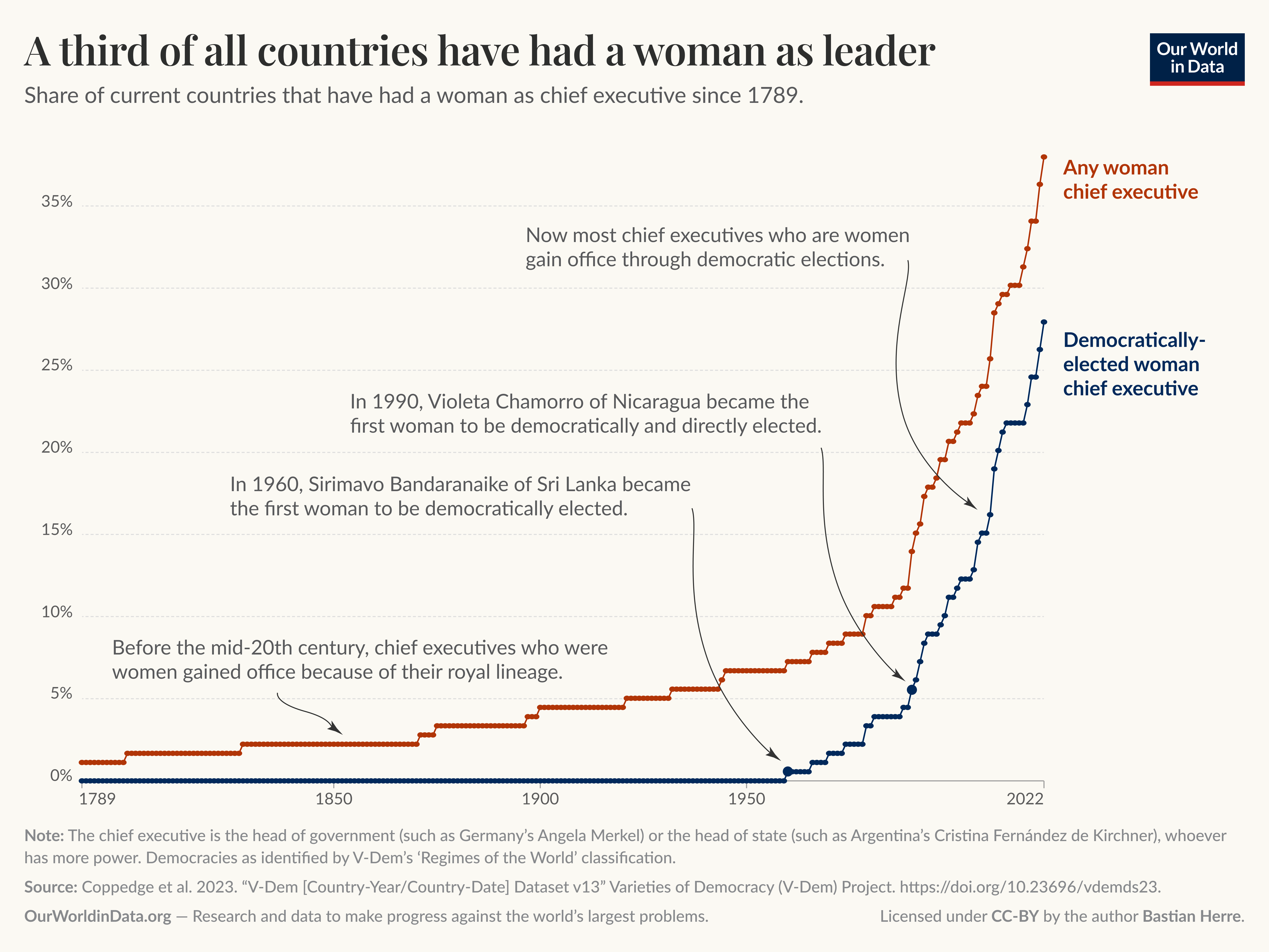
A third of all countries have had a woman as leader

The number of women leaders around the world has grown, but they still represent a small group. At the executive levels of government, women become prime ministers more often than they become presidents. Part of the differences in these roads to power is that prime ministers are elected by political party members themselves while presidents are elected by the public. In 2013, women accounted for 8 percent of all national leaders and 2 percent of all presidential posts. Furthermore, 75 percent of all female prime ministers and presidents have taken office in the two decades prior to 2016. Since 1960 to 2015, 108 women have become national leaders in 70 countries, with more being prime ministers than presidents.

Individual female executives usually have high levels of education and may have close relationships with politically prominent or upper-class families. The general status of women in a country does not predict if a woman will reach an executive position since, paradoxically, female executives have routinely ascended to power in countries where women's social standing lags behind men's.

Women have long struggled in more developed countries to become president or prime minister. Israel elected its first female prime minister, Golda Meir, in 1969, but has never done so again. The United States, on the other hand, has had no female presidents.

Sri Lanka was the first nation to have a female president, Chandrika Kumaratunga (1994–2006), and a female prime minister (her mother, Sirimavo Bandaranaike) simultaneously. Mary McAleese's election as president of Ireland (1997–2011) was the first time that a female president directly succeeded another female president, Mary Robinson. Jóhanna Sigurðardóttir, prime minister of Iceland (2009–2013), was the world's first openly lesbian world leader, and first female world leader to wed a same-sex partner while in office. Barbados was the first nation to have a female inaugural president, Sandra Mason (2021–2025).

One of the longest serving female non-royal heads of government is Sheikh Hasina. She is the longest-serving prime minister in the history of Bangladesh, having served for a combined total of 22 years, 349 days. Until her ouster in 2024, she was the world's longest serving elected female head of government.

In 2021, Estonia became the first country to have both a female elected head of state and elected head of government. (Among the countries where the head of state is directly elected, the first country to have both an elected female head of state and an elected female head of government is Moldova, also in 2021).

As of May 2024, 28 women serve as heads of state and/or government across 28 countries. Of these, 15 are serving as head of state, and 16 as head of government. The societal status of women does not necessarily correlate with their likelihood of achieving high executive positions, as evidenced by the emergence of many female leaders in nations where women generally have lower social standing. Notable examples include Sri Lanka, which was the first country to have both a female president and a female prime minister simultaneously, and Barbados, which has had a female head of state since it became a republic.

The United States has yet to have a female president. In 2020, the United States elected its first female vice president. The Democratic Party has had females as their nominee twice, with Hillary Clinton in 2016, and Kamala Harris in 2024 after Joe Biden withdrew from the presidential race.

=== National parliaments ===
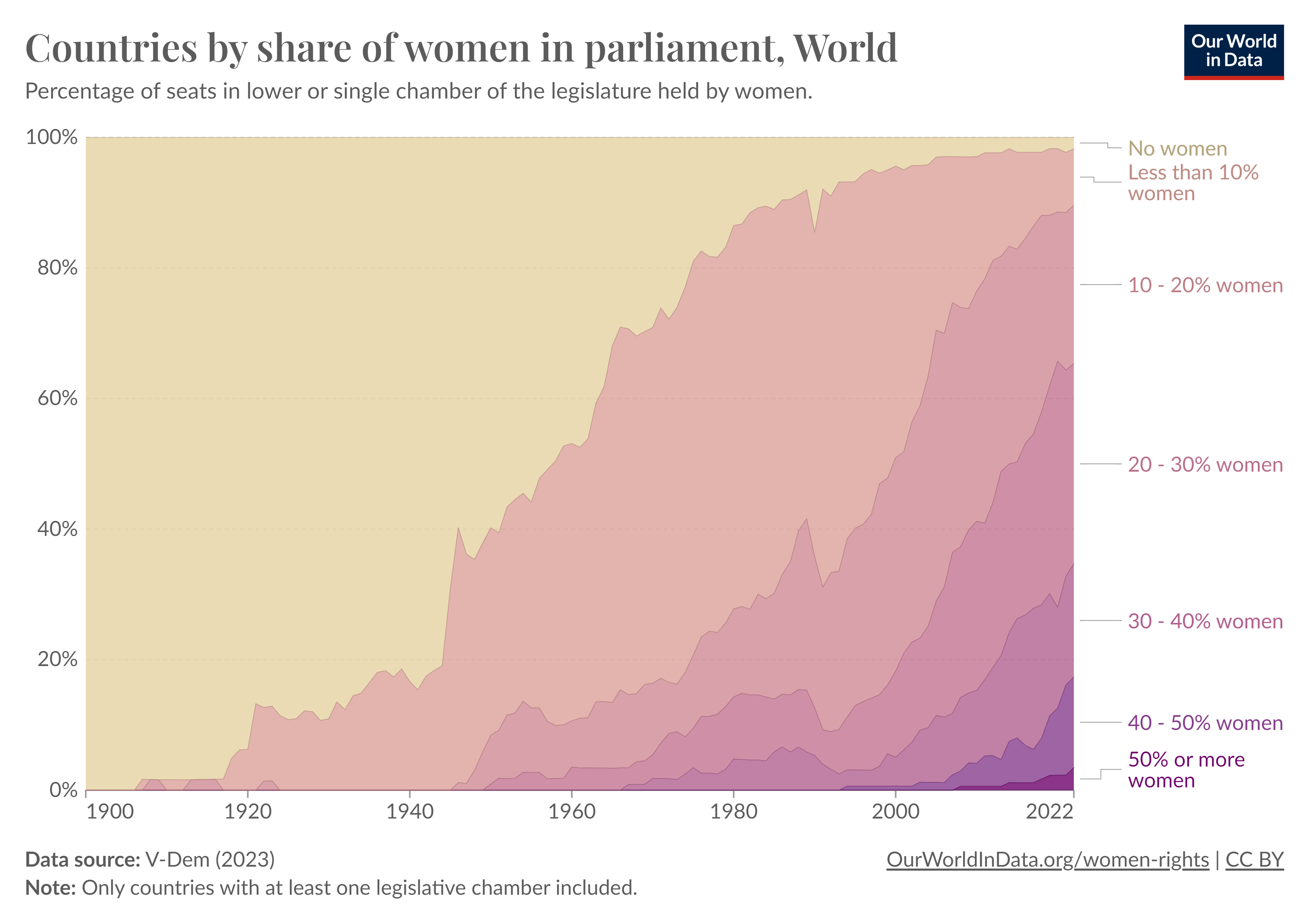
Countries by share of women in parliament

The proportion of women in national parliaments around the world is growing, but they are still underrepresented. As of 2026, the global average of women in national assemblies is just over 27%; in 2019, that average was 24.3 percent. At the same time, large differences exist between countries, e.g. Sri Lanka has quite low female participation rates in parliament compared with Rwanda, Cuba, and Nicaragua, where female representation rates are the highest. Three of the top ten countries in 2019 were in Latin America (Bolivia, Cuba, and Mexico), and the Americas have seen the greatest aggregate change over the past 20 years. In 2026, Latin American countries made up five of the top ten countries (Bolivia, Cuba, Mexico, Nicaragua and Costa Rica).

In 2007, researchers noted that "although women's representation in Latin America, Africa, and the West progressed slowly until 1995, in the most recent decade, these regions show substantial growth, doubling their previous percentage".

Out of 192 countries listed in descending order by the percentage of women in the lower or single house, the top 20 countries with the greatest representation of women in national parliaments are (figures reflect information as of January 1, 2020; a – represents a unicameral legislature with no upper house):

United States (lower house)

United States (Upper house)

1. Male 387 (59.5%)
2. Female 263 (40.5%)

France (Lower House)

Rank	Country	Lower or Single House	Upper House or Senate
1	Rwanda	61.25%	38.46%
2	Cuba	53.22%	–
3	Bolivia	53.08%	47.22%
4	New Zealand	50.42%	-
5	United Arab Emirates	50%	–
6	Mexico	48.2%	49.22%
7	Nicaragua	47.25%	–
8	Sweden	46.99%	–
9	Grenada	46.67%	30.77%
10	Andorra	46.4%	–
11	South Africa	46.35%	38.89%
12	Finland	46%	–
13	Costa Rica	45.61%	–
14	Spain	44%	39.02%
15	Senegal	43.03%	–
16	Namibia	42.71%	23.81%
17	Switzerland	41.5%	26.09%
18	Norway	41.42%	–
19	Mozambique	41.2%	–
20	Argentina	40.86%	40.28%

New figures are available for up to February 2014 from International IDEA, Stockholm University and Inter-Parliamentary Union.

As of 2026, 30 countries have 40% or more female representation in unicameral parliaments or the lower house of parliament. Among the major English-speaking democracies, Australia ranks at number 9 with 46% in the lower house, 56.6% in the upper house; New Zealand ranks at number 14 with women comprising 45.5% of its parliament; and the United Kingdom ranks at number 30 with 40.6% in the lower house, 31.5% in the upper house. Lower ranked are Canada, which is number 73 (30.3% lower house, 55.1% upper house); the United States is 84 (28.9% in the lower house, 26% in the upper house); and Ireland is 99 with 25%. Not all of these lower and/or upper houses in national parliaments are directly elected; for example, in Canada, members of the upper house (the Senate) are appointed.

As of 1 March 2022, Cuba has the highest percentage for countries without a quota. In South Asia, Nepal is highest in the rank of women participation in politics with 33%. Among East Asian countries, Taiwan has the highest percentage of women in Parliament (38.0%).

Pamela Paxton describes three factors that are reasons why national-level representation has become much larger over the past several decades. The first is the changing structural and economic conditions of nations, which says that educational advancements along with an increase in women's participation in the labor force encourages representation. The second is the political factor; representation of women in office being based on a proportionality system. Some voting systems are built so that a party that gains 25% of the votes gains 25% of the seats. In these processes, a political party feels obligated to balance the representation within their votes between genders, increasing women's activity in political standing. A plurality-majority system, such as used in the United States, United Kingdom, and India, allows only single-candidate elections, and thus allows political parties to entirely dictate regions' representatives even if they only control a small majority of the vote. Last, there is the ideological disposition of a country; the concept that the cultural aspects of women's roles or positions in the places they live dictate where they stand in that society, ultimately either helping or handicapping those women from entering political positions.

In 1995, the United Nations set a goal of 30% female representation. The current annual growth rate of women in national parliaments is about 0.5% worldwide. At this rate, gender parity in national legislatures will not be achieved until 2068.

=== Diplomacy ===
In Brazil, the Secretariat of Policies for Women, was until recently the main Brazilian state-feminism agency at the federal level. Under Workers' Party governments (2003–2016), Brazil carried out women-focused policies in three dimensions of its foreign policy: diplomacy, development cooperation, and security.

In Ireland, Ann Marie O'Brien has studied the women in the Irish Department of External Affairs associated with the League of Nations and United Nations, 1923–1976. She finds that women had greater opportunities at the UN.

In the United States, Frances E. Willis joined the Foreign Service in 1927, becoming only the third American woman to do so. She served in Chile, Sweden, Belgium, Spain, Britain, and Finland as well as the State Department. In 1953, she became the first female US ambassador to Switzerland and later served as ambassador to Norway and Ceylon.

=== State/province representation ===
In the U.S., on December 18, 2018, Nevada became the first state to have a female majority in its legislature. Women held nine of the 21 seats in the Nevada Senate, and 23 of the 42 seats in the Nevada Assembly. In 2025, Nevada still had the most female representation of any state; the only other states to have 50% or higher female representation were New Mexico and Colorado.

=== Local representation ===
According to UN Women, in 2025, women made up 35.6% of local governments worldwide. This is a significant increase from 2003, when a survey conducted by United Cities and Local Governments (UCLG), a global network supporting inclusive local governments, found that the average proportion of women in local councils was 15%. However, progress has been relatively stagnant since 2020. Notably, three countries have achieved gender parity, and 22 others report more than 40% female representation in these bodies. Despite these advances, substantial regional variations exist: representation is as high as 41% in Central and Southern Asia, but falls to just 20% in Western Asia and Northern Africa. This disparity underscores the diverse challenges and varying degrees of progress in promoting women's participation in local governance globally.

In leadership positions, the proportion of women was lower: In 2025, less than 15% of the world's mayors were women. However, women lead several of the world's largest cities, including Yoriko Koike, governor of Tokyo; Rekha Gupta, chief minister of Delhi; and Clara Brugada, head of government of Mexico City. In May 2024, of US cities with populations over 30,000, 26.8% of mayors are women.

There has been an increasing focus on women's representation at a local level. Most of this research is focused on developing countries. Governmental decentralization often results in local government structures that are more open to the participation of women, both as elected local councilors and as the clients of local government services.

According to a comparative study of women in local governments in East Asia and the Pacific, women have been more successful in reaching decision-making position in local governments than at the national level. Local governments tend to be more accessible and have more available positions. Also, women's role in local governments may be more accepted because it is seen as an extension of their involvement in the community.

=== Regime type ===
Democracies on average have twice the share of women in cabinets compared to autocracies. In authoritarian systems of government, rulers have relatively weak incentives to appoint women to cabinet positions. Rather, authoritarian rulers have greater incentives to appoint loyal individuals to the cabinet in order to increase their chance of survival and decrease the risk of coups and revolutions. In democracies, leaders are incentivized to appoint cabinet positions that will help them win re-election.

Unstable and anti-democracy regimes can be a threat to women's political advancement: "These gains can be easily rolled back when regimes change. The failure to make the private sphere part of political contestation diminishes the power of formal democratic rights and limits solutions to gender inequality".

== Challenges faced by women ==
Gender inequality within families, inequitable division of labor within households, and cultural attitudes about gender roles further subjugate women and serve to limit their representation in public life. Democracies with high levels of corruption also tend to underrepresent women in their governments. Societies that are highly patriarchal often have local power structures that make it difficult for women to combat. Thus, their interests are often not represented or are under-represented.

Political scientists separate the causes behind the underrepresentation of women in governmental positions into two categories: supply and demand. Supply refers to women's general ambition to run for office and access to resources like education and time, while demand refers to elite support, voter bias and institutional sexism. Women face numerous obstacles in achieving representation in governance. Studies show that one of the big challenges is financing a campaign. Studies also show that women running for political office raise a similar amount of money in comparison to their male counterparts, however they feel they need to work harder to do so. Sexual harassment and violence against women in politics also dissuades women from running.

Some have argued that politics is a "matrix of domination" impacted by race, class, gender and sexuality. Intersectional bias plays a large role in treatment women face when running for political office and their time serving in a political position. One study in Brazil found racial disparities that fall even heavier on women candidates during candidate recruitment and selection processes. Afro-descendant Brazilian women were the most disadvantaged when running for political office.

=== Pipeline challenges ===
According to a survey conducted with 3,640 elected municipal officeholders, women face adversity financing a campaign because they are not as heavily recruited as men by party leaders. There are two factors that contribute to this trend. Firstly, party leaders tend to recruit candidates who are similar to them. Since most party leaders are men, they usually see men as prime candidates because they share more similarities than they do with women.Also, recruitment works through networks such as lower level office holders or affiliated businesses. However, globally, women are often in the minority in the professions that are feeders for political office, such as law and business. Since women are underrepresented in these networks, they are less likely to be recruited than men. Due to these challenges, women have to spend time and conscious effort building a financial support system, unlike men.

The leaky pipeline occurs when party leaders or gatekeepers fail to actively recruit women, causing many qualified aspirants to drop out before the candidate stage. In one study that looked at campaign funding in Chile, researchers found a significant gender bias against women in campaign funding. In Chile, parties are given money directly from the government to allocate to their various candidates, and candidates are limited to a certain amount of money they can spend on their campaign. The Chilean government instituted multiple policies to try and increase gender representation. They placed a 40% quota on political seats and reimbursed political parties when they chose female political candidates in an effort to incentivize them. Even in this "least-likely" case, researchers found that in candidates with no prior experience running for office, men would out fundraise women.

Additionally, research shows that women are 60% less likely than men to believe they are qualified for political responsibility, which prevents them from even entering the race. Women are even significantly less likely than men to believe they are qualified when their professional credentials are equal or superior to those of male counterparts.

This phenomenon is heavily influenced by childhood socialization, where politics is frequently framed as a masculine domain. In the case of women's representation in government, it says that sex stereotyping begins at an early age and affects the public's disposition on which genders are fit for public office. Socialization agents can include family, school, higher education, mass media, and religion. Each of these agents plays a pivotal role in either fostering a desire to enter politics, or dissuading one to do so. Generally, girls are conditioned to see politics as a "male domain". Jacquetta Newman and Linda White suggest that women who run for political office have been "socialized toward an interest in and life in politics" and that "many female politicians report being born into political families with weak gender-role norms."

Researchers Richard Fox and Jennifer Lawless, who have tracked this data for 20 years, also find that women express less political ambition than their male counterparts:

What they identify as the primary reasons for that gap have also remain largely unchanged: traditional family role orientations, a masculinized ethos in political organizations and institutions, and a gendered psyche whereby women are more likely than men to doubt they have the qualifications necessary to run for office and win.

A 2015 study by Kristin Kanthak and Jonathan Woon explored why women's involvement in government is not at parity in the US. While there are multiple factors that are discussed throughout this page, the authors contend that women tend to be more election averse as opposed to men. It seems that women's willingness and ability to be involved in government is similar to the level of ambition in men, but when there is an election involved, their interest drops dramatically. Elections tend to be messy, damaging, and costly, driving many women away from running.

=== Voter bias and stereotypes ===
One major challenge female candidates must overcome to obtain political positions is voter bias. According to one study in Malawi, 58% of men and 73% of women claimed it was easier for men to get elected into higher office. In the US, according to one 2008 survey, 15% of Americans believe men make better political candidates than women. A 2017 study found that female Republican candidates in the US fare worse in elections than Republican men and Democratic women.

Some researchers have found that women are held to higher expectations in the electoral sphere. One study found that women are held to a higher ethical and moral standard than men. Data from eighteen Latin American countries showed that when certain scandals or accusations of misconduct were levied against an executive administration, public approval rating was lowered by a greater amount against the female executive rather than males on average. A 2026 survey of 1,700 Americans in Politics & Gender also found that when women "deviate from expectations or the views of their party, they are judged far more harshly than men by voters."

Sex stereotyping assumes that masculine and feminine traits are intertwined with leadership. Hence, the bias leveled against women stems from the perception that femininity inherently produces weak leadership. Due to the aggressive and competitive nature of politics, many insist that participation in elected office requires masculine traits.

In the US, many voters assume men and women possess traits that reflect traditional gender stereotypes: One 2022 study found that voters assume women are more liberal than men, and more compassionate, and weaker on issues such as the economy, law enforcement and the military than men. However, these stereotypes do not always disadvantage women. It also found that voters tend to credit women with being more competent in areas like education and welfare. Researchers also found that these gender biases may be less pronounced than in the past, and that strong partisanship may cancel out disadvantage from gender stereotypes.

=== Intersectionality and challenges faced by women ===
Race, specifically, plays an increasingly large role in the challenges faced by women when deciding to run for office, actively running for office, and actively holding office. In one study which focused on the treatment of Afro-Brazilian women, researchers found that institutionalizing parties increases the chance that parties will elect women; however the effect was more muted for Afro-Brazilians. In Brazil, Afro-Brazilians already face a significant resource gap like lower average income and higher illiteracy rates. In conjunction with these barriers, Afro-Brazilian women also face barriers to access to power. Researchers found that Afro-descendant women consistently raised less money and won fewer voters even when they possessed other traditional characteristics of a successful political candidate.

One study found that intersectionality plays a significant role in the ambition of women and their decision to run for political office in the US. Researchers found that when women were told the varying reasons for underrepresentation of women in political office, women of different races responded very differently. Researchers stated that:

Attributing women's lack of parity to demand factors allows white and Asian women to "discount" the possibility that failure rests on their own abilities, thus increasing women's political ambition. Alternatively, framing women's underrepresentation as due to supply factors depresses white and Asian women's political ambition possibly because of stereotype threat. Black women respond in an opposite manner, with depressed political ambition in demand scenarios, while Latinas are unaffected by these narratives.

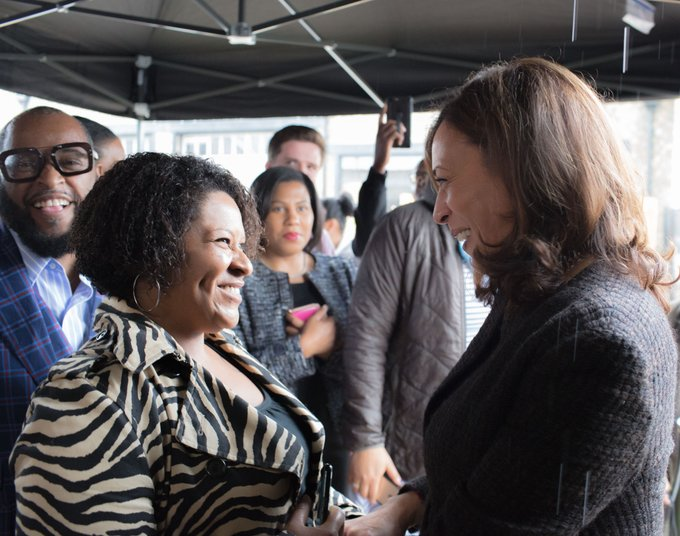
Kamala Harris, example of a woman who overcame systemic challenges, now in a high position of government

=== Systematic challenges ===
There have been many arguments saying the plurality-majority voting system is a disadvantage to the chance that women get into office. Andrew Reynolds brings forth one of these arguments by stating: "Plurality-majority single-member-district systems, whether of the Anglo-American first-past-the-post (FPTP) variety, the Australian preference ballot alternative vote (AV), or the French two-round system (TRS), are deemed to be particularly unfavorable to women's chances of being elected to office". Andrew believes that the best systems are list-proportional systems. "In these systems of high proportionality between seats won and votes cast, small parties are able to gain representation and parties have an incentive to broaden their overall electoral appeal by making their candidate lists as diverse as possible".

Even once elected, women tend to hold lesser valued cabinet ministries or similar positions. These are sometimes described as "soft industries" and include health, education, and welfare. Far less often do women hold executive decision-making authority in more powerful domains or those that are associated with traditional notions of masculinity (such as finance and the military). Typically, the more powerful the institution, the less likely it is that women's interests will be represented. Additionally, in more autocratic nations, women are less likely to have their interests represented.

Many women attain political standing due to kinship ties, as they have male family members who are involved in politics. Studies have found women's desire to run is heavily bolstered by relational encouragement. These women tend to be from higher income, higher status families and thus may not be as focused on the issues faced by lower income families. In The United States, the lower end of the professional ladder contains a higher proportion of women while the upper level contains a higher proportion of men. Research shows that women are underrepresented in head positions in state agencies making up only 18% of Congress and 15% of corporate board positions. When women do gain any level of representation it is often in the fields more heavily associated with traditionally feminine traits such as health, welfare, and labor.

When women are represented, however, it can open doors for other female candidates. A 2018 study in the American Economic Journal: Economic Policy found that for German local elections "female council candidates advance more from their initial list rank when the mayor is female. This effect spreads to neighboring municipalities and leads to a rising share of female council members."

=== Unequal scrutiny ===
Women running for public office typically experience excessive scrutiny on their private lives. The Harvard Civil Rights-Civil Liberties Review wrote that women in politics "are expected to be both likeable and qualified, where men running for similar positions only have to be qualified (and likeability is just a bonus). Women who are seen as assertive and driven are written off as being too power hungry, whereas men are praised (and, often, elected) for exhibiting the same traits."

The fashion choices of politically active women are often picked apart by the media. In these "analyses" women rarely gain approval from those in the media, who usually say they either they show too much skin or too little, or perhaps that they either look too feminine or too masculine. Sylvia Bashevkin also notes that their romantic lives are often subject of much interest to the general population, at times more so than their political agenda or stances on issues. She points out that those who "appear to be sexually active outside a monogamous heterosexual marriage run into particular difficulties, since they tend to be portrayed as vexatious vixens" who are more interested in their private romantic lives than in their public responsibilities. If they are in a monogamous, married relationship but have children, then their fitness for office becomes a question of how they manage being a politician while taking care of their children, something that a male politician would rarely, if ever, be asked about.

Women are shown to face more consequences when facing scandals. A study done in 2019 by Catherine Reyes-Housholder uses former Chilean president Michelle Bachelet as a case study on the effect of approval rating as determined by gender during controversy. The study found that male presidents' approval ratings do not change with perceived corruption in government, but women's ratings do.

=== Work-life balance ===
Family duties and family forming can cause significant delays in aspiring women's political careers. The work life balance is invariably more difficult for women, because they are generally expected by most societies to act as the primary caregivers for children and maintainers of the home. Due to these demands, some assume that women would choose to delay political aspirations until their children are older. Also, a woman may postpone or deny her own desire for a career in politics if she feels her family duties might interfere. Research has shown that new female politicians in Canada and the U.S. are older than their male counterparts. Conversely, a woman may be pushed to remain childless in order to seek political office.

Institutional barriers may also pose as a hindrance for balancing a political career and family. For instance, in Canada, Members of Parliament do not contribute to Employment Insurance; therefore, they are not entitled to paternity benefits. Such lack of parental leave would undoubtedly be a reason for women to delay seeking electoral office. Furthermore, mobility plays a crucial role in the work-family dynamic. Elected officials are usually required to commute long distances to and from their respective capital cities, which can be a deterrent for women seeking political office. In the media, women are often asked how they would balance the responsibilities of elected office with those to their families, something men are never asked.

While campaigning in the 2018 United States House of Representatives elections in New York, Democratic primary candidate Liuba Grechen Shirley used campaign funds to pay a caregiver for her two young children. The FEC ruled that federal candidates can use campaign funds to pay for child care costs that result from time spent running for office. Grechen Shirley became the first woman in history to receive approval to spend campaign funds on child care.

A 2020 study found that being promoted to the position of mayor or parliamentarian doubles the probability of divorce for women, but not for men.

=== Sexism within political parties ===
While a majority of some political parties' elected legislators have been women (i.e. the New Zealand Labour and Green parties in 2020), that remains the exception globally. As a result, institutional bias against women within parties is still a challenge.

In Canada, there is evidence that female politicians face gender stigma from male members of the political parties to which they belong which can undermine the ability of women to reach or maintain leadership roles. Pauline Marois, leader of the Parti Québécois (PQ) and the official opposition of the National Assembly of Quebec, was the subject of a claim by Claude Pinard, a PQ "backbencher", that many Quebecers do not support a female politician: "I believe that one of her serious handicaps is the fact she's a woman [...] I sincerely believe that a good segment of the population won't support her because she's a woman". A 2000 study that analyzed 1993 election results in Canada found that among "similarly situated women and men candidates", women actually had a small vote advantage. The study showed that neither voter turnout nor urban/rural constituencies were factors that help or hurt a female candidate, but "office-holding experience in non-political organizations made a modest contribution to women's electoral advantage".

Bruce M. Hicks, an electoral studies researcher at Université de Montréal, states that evidence shows that female candidates begin with a head start in voters' eyes of as much as 10 percent, and that female candidates are often more favorably associated by voters with issues like health care and education. The electorate's perception that female candidates have more proficiency with traditional women's spheres such as education and health care presents a possibility that gender stereotypes can work in a female candidate's favor, at least among the electorate. In politics, however, Hicks points out that sexism is nothing new:

(Marois' issue) does reflect what has been going on for some time now: women in positions of authority have problems in terms of the way they manage authority [...] The problem isn't them, it's the men under them who resent taking direction from strong women. And the backroom dirty dialogue can come into the public eye.

Within Quebec itself, Don McPherson pointed out that Pinard himself has enjoyed greater electoral success with Marois as party leader than under a previous male party leader, when Pinard failed to be elected in his riding. Demographically, Pinard's electoral riding is rural, with "relatively older, less-well educated voters".

In Nigeria, there are few women in national leadership. In 2026, only seven of the 107 senators and 15 of the 356 members of the House of Representatives are women. This number has been on a downward trend since 2011. Ekor Nkereuwem has reasoned this is due to four main factors:

In the preelection phase, individual and systemic factors converge to heighten the entry bar for women politicians. Well-noted systemic factors, such as gatekeeping by political parties, limit women’s access to high offices. Similarly, cultural and religious factors create significant variety in women’s representation across the country.

=== Violence and harassment against women politicians ===
In Kenya, a woman's rights activist named Asha Ali was threatened and beaten by three men for standing as a candidate in front of her kids and elderly mother. A 2010 survey of eight hundred likely U.S. voters found that even very mild sexist language had an impact on their likelihood of voting for a woman (Krook, 2017). Even in early 2016, a 14-year-old girl was kidnapped from her bed late at night and raped as revenge for her mother's victory in local elections in India, which is an example of sexual violence. All of this evidence suggests that women face many challenges in a political environment where men try to suppress women whenever they try to raise their voices in politics for making positive change for women's empowerment.

According to the Center for Countering Digital Hate, of 1000 abusive comments (including rape and death threats) that were reported to Instagram or targeting female politicians in the US, parent company Meta took no action on 93% of them. Forty-three percent of women legislators at the state level report experiencing threats or abuse, and 40% were unwilling to seek reelection or pursue higher office as a result.

In another form of sexual harassment, female politicians are increasingly being subjected to images of themselves in deepfake AI pornography. In the US, Rep. Alexandria Ocasio-Cortez (D-NY) and Rep. Laurel Lee (R-FL) have introduced the DEFIANCE Act, a bill that would let victims of deepfake AI pornography sue in civil court against the makers and purveyors of the pornography.

=== Media invisibility ===
Women running for office are often underrepresented in news coverage. One study of US Senate candidates found female candidates were treated differently in the media than their male counterparts, receiving less news coverage and/or coverage that concentrates more on their viability and less on their issue positions. This combination of factors can cause female candidates to be overlooked and underrated during elections.

== Mirror representation ==
Rates of women's participation in formal politics is lower than men's throughout the world. The argument put forth by scholars Jacquetta Newman and Linda White is that women's participation in politics is crucial if the goal is to affect the quality of public policy. As such, the concept of mirror representation aims to achieve gender parity in public office. Mirror representation says that the proportion of women in leadership should match the proportion of women in the population that they govern, and should be a miniature reflection of the population's diversity. When a significant gap exists between the percentage of women in the population and their presence in office, the mirror is described as distorted. This distortion is not merely a statistical anomaly but a reflection of barriers in the system. The degree of distortion in office is often tied to the specific electoral system used by a nation, where majority take all systems tend to show an increase in representation gaps more than proportional representation systems. Mirror representation is premised on the assumption that elected officials of a particular gender would likely support policies that seek to benefit constituents of the same gender.

=== Effects on public policy ===
A key critique is that mirror representation assumes that all members of a particular sex operate under the rubric of a shared identity, without taking into consideration other factors such as age, education, culture, or socioeconomic status. According to the Recruitment Gap theory, the mirror of representation is distorted much earlier in the political recruitment model. The focus shifts from the demand side to the supply side. A major barrier exists at the very beginning of the process because childhood socialization often frames politics as a male domain, discouraging women from seeing themselves as political leaders. However, proponents of mirror representation argue that women have a different relationship with government institutions and public policy than men, and therefore merit proportional representation. This feature is based on the historical reality that women, regardless of background, have largely been excluded from influential legislative and leadership positions. As Sylvia Bashevkin notes, "representative democracy seems impaired, partial, and unjust when women, as a majority of citizens, fail to see themselves reflected in the leadership of their polity." In fact, the issue of participation of women in politics is of such importance that the United Nations has identified gender equality in representation (i.e. mirror representation) as a goal in the Convention on the Elimination of All Forms of Discrimination against Women (CEDAW) and the Beijing Platform for Action. Besides seeking equality, the goal of mirror representation is also to recognize the significance of women's involvement in politics, which subsequently legitimizes said involvement.

There have been differing results between studies that looked at the significance of women's representation on actual policy outcomes. Though women in the United States are more likely to identify as feminists, a 2014 study looking at the United States finds "no effect of gender of the mayor on policy outcomes." A 2012 study finds mixed evidence that the share of female councilors in Sweden affected conditions for women citizens, such as women's income, unemployment, health, and parental leave. A 2015 study in Sweden said that: "The findings show that female legislators defend feminist interests more than their male colleagues but that they only marginally respond to women's electoral preferences." A 2016 study looking at African politicians finds "gender differences in policy priorities [to be] quite small on average, vary across policy domains and countries".

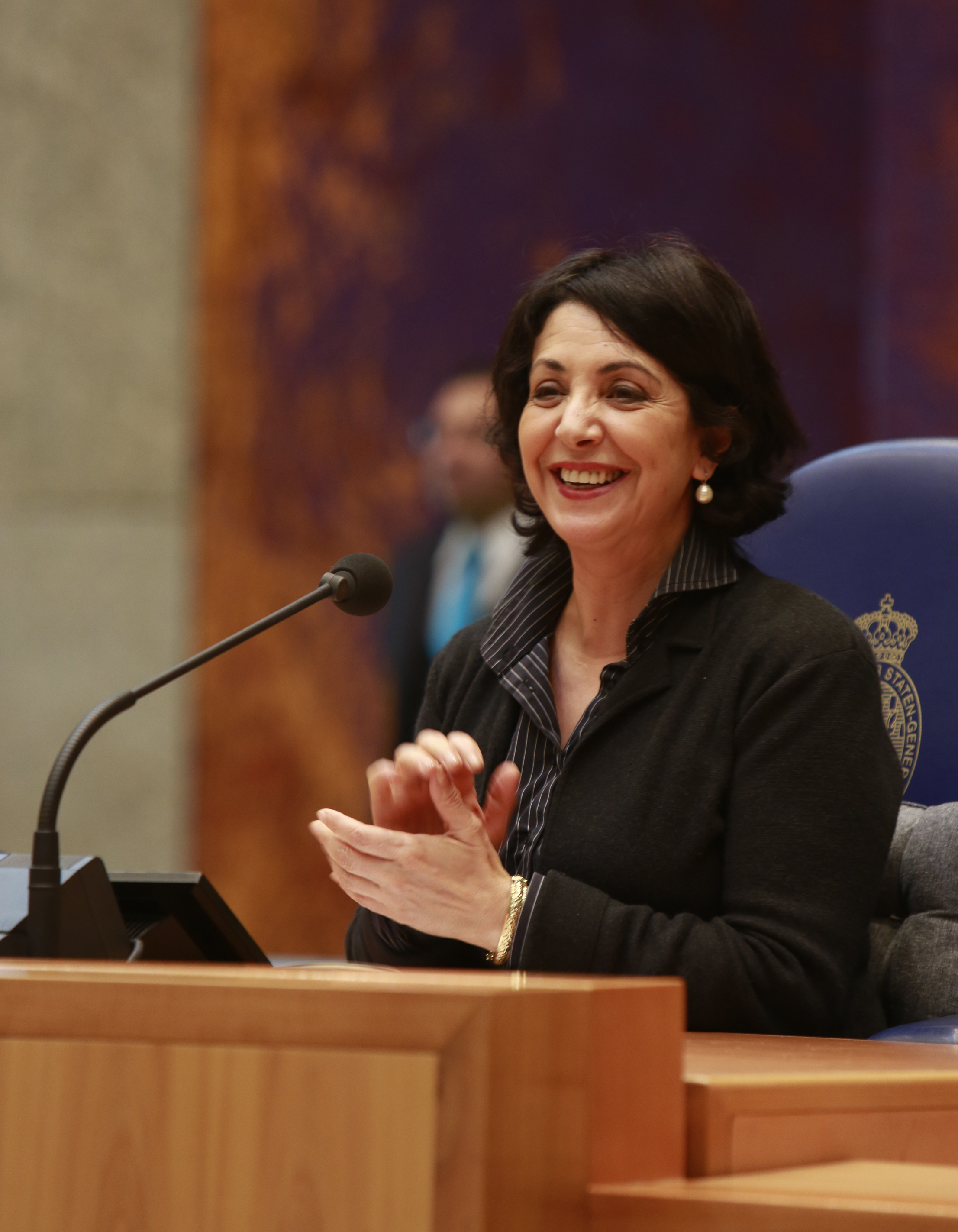
Khadija Arib at the Dutch Parliament

According to the OECD, the increased presence of women cabinet ministers is associated with a rise in public health spending across many countries.

== Pathways to political involvement ==
Globally, there have been four general pathways that have led women into political office:

- Political family – women in this path come from families that have a long history of involvement in electoral politics.
- Surrogate – women in this path have assumed office, often temporarily, as a surrogate for a father, husband, or brother who has recently died.
- Party or political insider – women in this path start at the bottom of a party or political ladder and work their way up over time filling in necessary roles to show loyalty to the party.
- Political outsider – women in this path usually lack political experience but they run on a platform emphasizing new political changes and serve as an alternative to the status quo.

In 2017, Farida Jalalzai studied 108 women executives (presidents and prime ministers) from countries around the world. Of those, 22 were provisional. Of the non-provisional executives, more than a quarter of female executives overall were from a political family. In Latin America, 75% of non-provisional executives had blood ties to a former president or political figure; in Asia, that rate was 78%.

Jalalzai also noted that while women often lead or participate in revolutionary or democratization movements, this rarely leads to political ascension. Familial ties are found to be a larger determinant of political ascension than any sort of merit.

== Policies to increase women's participation ==
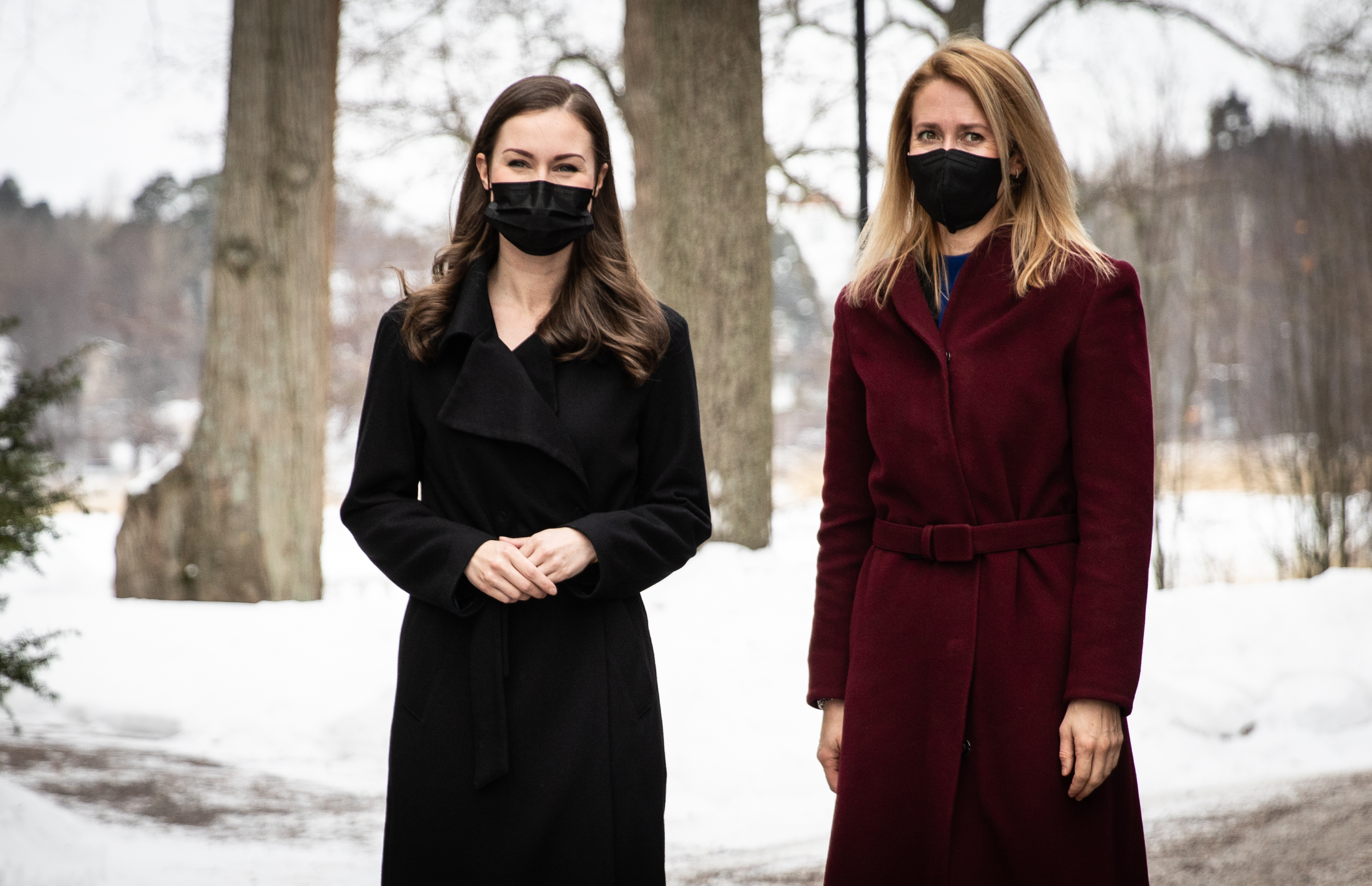
Finnish prime minister Sanna Marin with Estonian prime minister Kaja Kallas in Helsinki, 2021

The political recruitment model is a term coined by political scientists who studied why women do not hold political positions at the same rates men do. The political recruitment model categorizes the steps between a citizen and politician, and many political scientists use this to study where women are losing the opportunity and chances to hold elected office. The political recruitment model has four parts: eligible, aspirants, candidates, and elected.

The United Nations has identified six avenues by which female participation in politics and government may be strengthened. These avenues are:

- equalization of educational opportunities,
- quotas for female participation in governing bodies,
- legislative reform to increase focus on issues concerning women and children,
- financing gender-responsive budgets to equally take into account the needs of men and women,
- increasing the presence of sex-disaggregated statistics in national research/data,
- furthering the presence and agency of grassroots women's empowerment movements

=== Education ===
Women with formal education (at any level) are more likely to delay marriage and subsequent childbirth, be better informed about infant and child nutrition, and ensure childhood immunization. Children of mothers with formal education are better nourished and have higher survival rates. Education is a vital tool for any person in society to better themselves in their career path, and equalization of educational opportunities for boys and girls may take the form of several initiatives:

- abolishment of educational fees which would require parents to consider financial issues when deciding which of their children to educate. Poor children in rural areas are particularly affected by inequality resulting from educational fees.
- encouragement of parents and communities to institute gender-equal educational agenda. Perceived opportunity cost of educating girls may be addressed through a conditional cash transfer program which financially reward families who educate their daughters (thus removing the financial barrier that results from girls substituting school attendance for work in the family labor force).
- creation of "girl-friendly" schools to minimize bias and create a safe school environment for girls and young women. Currently, a barrier to female school attendance is the risk of sexual violence en route to school. A "safe school environment" is one in which the school is located to minimize such violence, in addition to providing girls with educational opportunities (as opposed to using female students to perform janitorial work or other menial labor).

Mark P. Jones, in reference to Norris's Legislative Recruitment, states that: "Unlike other factors that have been identified as influencing the level of women's legislative representation, such as a country's political culture and level of economic development, institutional rules are relatively easy to change".

In an article about the exclusion of Women from politics in southern Africa, Amanda Gouws said "The biggest hurdles to overcome for women are still on the local level where both men and women are often recruited from the communities and have limited political skills". The level of education in these local governments or, for that matter, the people in those positions of power, are substandard.

One example of the hurdles women face in receiving good education comes from Beijing. "Most women who attended the NGO Forums accompanying the UN conferences, which are for government delegations (though increasingly many governments include activists and NGO members among their official delegates), were middle-class educated women from INGOS, donors, academics, and activists". Lydia Kompe, a well-known South African activist, was one of these rural women. She noted that she felt overwhelmed and completely disempowered. In the beginning, she did not think she could finish her term of office because of her lack of education. Manisha Desai explains that: "There is an inequality simply around the fact that the UN system and its locations say a lot about the current focus of those systems, such positions being in the US and Western Europe allow easier access to those women in the area." It is also important to note that institutions affect the cultural propensity to elect women candidates in different ways in different parts of the world.

The study of the history of women's representation has been a major contribution in helping scholars view such concepts. Andrew Reynolds states: "historical experience often leads to gender advancement, and political liberalization enables women to mobilize within the public sphere". He argues that we will see a larger number of women in higher office positions in established democracy than in democracies that are developing, and "the more illiberal a state is, the fewer women will be in positions of power". As countries open education systems to women, and more women participate in historically male dominated fields, it is possible to see a shift in political views regarding women in government.

=== Quotas ===
Example of a TRS ballot papers

Quotas are explicit requirements on the number of women in political positions. "Gender quotas for the election of legislators have been used since the late 1970s by a few political parties (via the party charter) in a small number of advanced industrial democracies; such examples would be like Germany and Norway". Andrew Reynolds says there is "an increasing practice in legislatures for the state, or the parties themselves, to utilize formal or informal quota mechanisms to promote women as candidates and MPs". The statistics surrounding quota systems have been examined thoroughly by academia. The European Court of Human Rights decided its first female quota case in 2019, and as of December 2019, one male quota case is pending with the court. In the case Zevnik and Others v Slovenia, the court expressed its strong support for gender quotas as a tool to increase women participation in politics. Gender quotas are popular form of state feminism.

Types of quotas include:

- Sex quota systems: institute a "critical value" below which a government is deemed imbalanced. Examples of such a critical value could include a goal that 30% of legislators are female.
- Legal quota systems regulate the governance of political parties and bodies. Such quotas may be mandated by electoral law (as the Argentine quota law, for example) or may be constitutionally required (as in Nepal).
- Voluntary party quota systems may be used by political parties at will, yet not mandated by electoral law or by a country's constitution. If a country's leading or majority political party engages in a voluntary party quota system, the effect may "trickle down" to minority political parties in the country (as in the case of the African National Congress in South Africa).

Quotas may be utilized during different stages of the political nomination/selection process to address different junctures at which women may be inherently disadvantaged:

- Potential candidacy: sex quota systems can mandate that from the pool of aspirants, a certain percentage of them must be female.
- Nomination: legal or voluntary quotas are enforced upon this stage, during which a certain portion of nominated candidates on the party's ballot must be female.
- Election: "reserved seats" may be filled only by women.

Quota usage can have marked effects on female representation in governance. Stronger quotas are estimated to increase the number of women elected to parliament by about three times as compared to weaker quotas. In 1995, Rwanda ranked 24th in terms of female representation, and jumped to 1st in 2003 after quotas were introduced. Similar effects can be seen in Argentina, Iraq, Burundi, Mozambique, and South Africa. Of the top-ranked 20 countries in terms of female representation in government, 17 of these countries utilize some sort of quota system to ensure female inclusion. Though such inclusion is mainly instituted at the national level, there have been efforts in India to addresses female inclusion at the subnational level, through quotas for parliamentary positions.

With quotas drastically changing the number of female representatives in political power, a bigger picture unravels. Though countries are entitled to regulate their own laws, the quota system helps explain social and cultural institutions and their understandings and overall view of women in general. "At first glance, these shifts seem to coincide with the adoption of candidate gender quotas around the globe as quotas have appeared in countries in all major world regions with a broad range of institutional, social, economic and cultural characteristics".

Quotas have been quite useful in allowing women to gain support and opportunities when attempting to achieve seats of power, but many see this as a wrongdoing. Drude Dahlerup and Lenita Freidenvall make this argument: "From a liberal perspective, quotas as a specific group right conflict with the principle of equal opportunity for all. Explicitly favoring certain groups of citizens, i.e. women, means that not all citizens (men) are given an equal chance to attain a political career". Dahlerup and Freidenvall claim that even though quotas create theoretical imbalance in opportunity for men and that they necessarily break the concept of "classical liberal notion of equality", quotas are almost required to bring the relation of women in politics to a higher state, whether that is through equal opportunity or just equal results. They continue, "According to this understanding of women's under-representation, mandated quotas for the recruitment and election of female candidates, possibly also including time-limit provisions, are needed".

The introduction of gender quotas in the electoral process has spurred controversy, resulting in resistance to the acceptance of quotas. Historically, male power and domination hindered the mobilization of women in politics. But the implementation of gender quotas can mean fewer slots for male candidates, since they have to make room for their female counterparts. Commonly referred to as the "negative sum," critics say this can result in a more qualified male being rejected in order to allow a female politician to participate.

Argentina, which is currently mandated for a 30% female party at each level of government, saw the introduction of 'quota women'; females that were said to be less experienced, and only elected due to the legal requirement of quotas. The introduction of 'quota women' has triggered what political scientists refer to as a 'mandate effect,' in which quota women feel obligated to represent solely the interests of the female public.

Advocates for quotas say that the notion of what constitutes being "more qualified" remains unclear, and this critique is often used as an oppressive tool to maintain the status quo, namely, excluding women. Indeed, we can only use proxies to predict future performances. For example, research has since long proven that the use of SAT scores in the U.S. for university admission favours privileged classes which can receive extra training before the test, while less favoured classes could have succeeded as much or even more once in college. The problem of proxies is even worse in the case of women, as this is added to the cognitive bias of Homophily, which lead men already in power to favour other males to work with them. Moreover, in order to preserve male political survival, "domination techniques" have been utilized to both exclude and delegitimize female representation in politics, and this can be depicted in the case of Argentina, where it took several elections to gain 35% female representation. With that increase, however, issues that were rarely discussed before became paramount in debates, such as "penal laws, sexual assault laws, and laws on maternity leave and pregnancy... sexual education, [and] emergency contraceptive."

According to Susan Franceschet and Jennifer Piscopo, substantive representation contains two distinct parts: both the process and outcome of having female politicians. Substantive representation based on the process is concerned with the gendered perspective, themes that female representatives discuss in political debates, and the impact they have on the creation of bills. Likewise, this process also includes the networking between women in government and female organizations. Substantive representation by outcome relates to the success of passing legislation that enables gender equality to both public and private issues. Moreover, substantive representation as process does not always result in substantive representation by outcome; the implementation of gender quotas and female representation does not directly instigate an influx in legislation.

Critical mass theory has correlations with both substantive representation as process and substantive representation as outcome. Critical mass theory suggests that once a certain percentage of women representatives has been reached, that female legislators will be able to create and enable transformative policies, and this has the potential to place pressure on quota women to act on behalf of all women. Reaching a critical mass eliminates the pressure of maintaining the status quo, to which minorities are forced to conform to avoid being labeled as outsiders by the majority. One major criticism of critical mass theory is its attention to numbers, and the understanding that 'quota women' are to represent women collectively. Furthermore, the representation of women as a collective group remains controversial, say Franceschet and Piscopo, as "[if] she is a white straight, middle-class mother, she cannot speak for African-American women, or poor women, or lesbian women on the basis of her own experience anymore than men can speak for women merely on the basis of theirs."

One cross-national study found that the implementation of electoral gender quotas, which substantially increased women's representation in parliament, led to increased government expenditures toward public health and relative decreases in military spending, consistent with a presumption that women favor the former while men favor the latter in the countries included in the study. However, while a numerical boost in women legislators may nudge policy in the direction of women's interests, women legislators can be pigeon-holed into specializing in legislation on women's issues, as a study finds for legislators in Argentina, Colombia, and Costa Rica. In Argentina, another study finds that the introduction of gender quotas increased the total frequency of bills introduced regarding women's issues, while lowering the frequency men introduced bills in this legislative area – this evidence leads the authors to conclude that the introduction of female legislators may decrease the incentive of men legislators to introduce policies in line with women's interests.

=== Legislative focuses ===
Women's representation in the political arena tends to benefit issues that impact women. However, women tend to have more success politically in areas stereotypically associated with them, such as health and education: "Looking at ministerial positions broken down by portfolio allocation, one sees a worldwide tendency to place women in the softer sociocultural ministerial positions rather than in the harder and politically more prestigious positions of economic planning, national security, and foreign affairs, which are often seen as stepping-stones to national leadership".

Legislative agendas, some pushed by female political figures, may focus on several key issues to address ongoing gender disparities:

- Reducing domestic and gender-based violence. The Convention on the Rights of the Child, published by the United Nations in 1989, addressed domestic violence and its effects on children. The convention stipulates that children are holders of human rights, and authorizes the State to 1) prevent all forms of violence, and 2) respond to past violence effectively. Gender-based violence, such as the use of rape as a tool of warfare, was addressed in Resolution 1325 of the UN Security Council in 2000. It calls for "all parties of armed conflict to take special measures to protect women and girls from gender-based violence."
- Reducing in-home discrimination through equalizing property and inheritance rights. National legislation can supersede traditionally male-dominated inheritance models. Such legislation has been proven effective in countries like Colombia, where 60% of land is held in joint titles between men and women (compared to 18% before the passage of joint titling legislation in 1996).

=== Financing ===
Gender-responsive budgets incorporates a gender perspective through all stages of the budget process, allowing for inclusive distribution of resources. Benefits of gender-responsive budgets include:

- Improved budget efficiency by ensuring that funds are allocated where they are needed most
- Strengthened government position by advocating for needs of all, including the underrepresented
- Increased information flow surrounding needs of those who are usually discriminated against

A gender-responsive budget may also work to address issues of unpaid care work and caring labor gaps.

In the last several decades, a number of countries have tied state funding of political parties to compliance with gender quotas, known as gender-targeted public funding. The idea is to use state funding to incentivize political parties to increase gender diversity on their ballot by either giving a fine or give extra resources to parties depending on whether they satisfy a fixed gender balance goal. A 2021 study published in American Political Science Review found that this type of state-driven gendered electoral financing is likely to lead to success when combined with either proportional representation of a 15% minimum of women MPs.

=== Research/data improvements ===
Current research which uses sex-aggregated statistics may underplay or minimize the quantitative presentation of issues such as maternal mortality, violence against women, and girls' school attendance. Sex-disaggregated statistics are lacking in the assessment of maternal mortality rates, for example. Prior to UNICEF and UNIFEM efforts to gather more accurate and comprehensive data, 62 countries had no recent national data available regarding maternal mortality rates and only 38 countries had sex-disaggregated statistics available to report frequency of violence against women. As of 2023, UN agencies collect data on maternal mortality, violence against women and school attendance by gender from over 190 countries and territories, The World Economic Forum also tracks the gender wage gap across 148 economies.

=== Grassroots empowerment movements ===
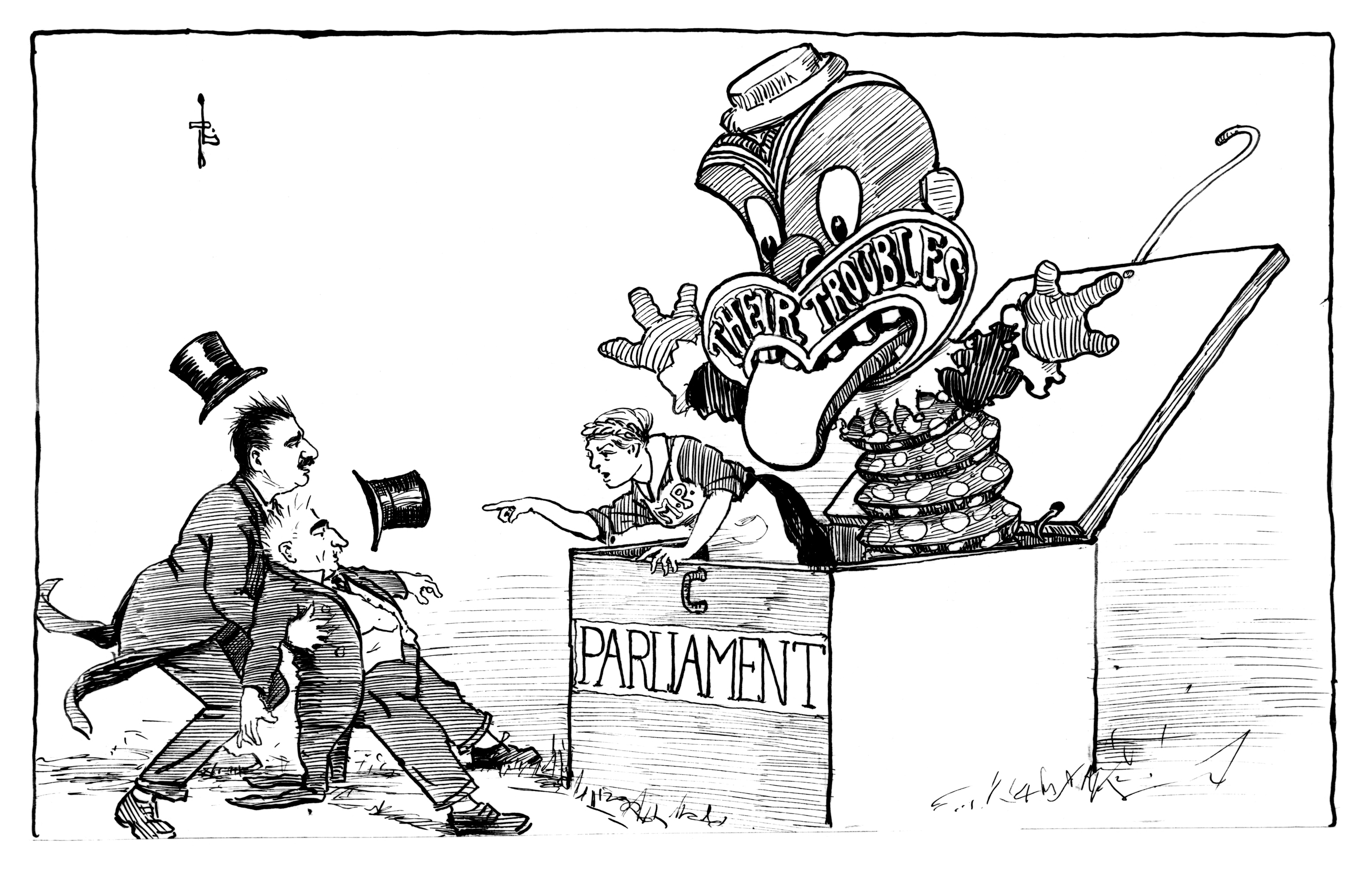
The lady in the case, an example of how some have interpreted women's involvement in government

Women's informal collectives are crucial to improving the standard of living for women worldwide. Collectives can address such issues as nutrition, education, shelter, food distribution, and help generally improve standard of living. Empowering such collectives can increase their reach to the women most in need of support. Though women's movements have had great success in this area, other groups are taking different approaches to the issue. For example, Mala Htun and Laurel Weldon explain that a democratic country is more likely to listen to "autonomous organizing" within the government.

When it comes to local government issues, women's political standing may not be a paramount issue. Amanda Gouws notes "Even civil society organizations left women's issues off the agenda. At this level, traditional leaders also have a vested interest that generally opposes women's interests". She argues that "direct action should shift to the transnational level, where feminist solidarity on that level can lead to changes on a local level."

== Effects of women's representation in government ==
As established elsewhere on this page, women are largely underrepresented in government bodies for a variety of reasons, including a leaky pipeline, contending with bias, violence and harassment, and gender role expectations. These factors prevent many women from attempting to enter the political field. More demographics often bring different experiences, attitudes and resources that greatly affect legislation, party agendas, and constituency service. A study by Chris Bonneau and Kristin Kanthak on responses to Hillary Clinton's 2016 presidential campaign videos found that women supporters who witnessed her run for presidency were more likely to want to run themselves. (Non-supporters were less likely to say they would run for office after viewing the videos.)

Since women have been historically marginalized, the symbolic effect of women entering politics impacts whether women feel represented and heard. Studies find that the more women in state legislature, the more likely women are to run for office than in a male dominated government system. The increased representation in government roles also incentivizes political engagement and activity, whether that means voting or campaigning.

There have been agencies of the US government and numerous nonprofit organizations dedicated to improving representation for women, such as the Office of Public Engagement and Intergovernmental Affairs, a past United States government office specifically focused on representation in the White House. Another example is the White House Council of Women and Girls, another United States governmental organization which was disbanded in 2017 under the Trump Administration. It should be mentioned that intersectionality is a common approach in these agencies, as gender, race and sexuality can overlap.

=== Women's leadership in the COVID-19 crisis ===
Affirmative action both corrects existing unfair treatment and gives women equal opportunity in the future. Moreover, the impact that gender representation can have on politics cannot be emphasized enough. In their noteworthy paper on examining the effects of female leadership in the times of crisis, Raphael Bruce et al. show that women as mayors in Brazilian municipalities had a significant impact on reducing the number of COVID-19 deaths and hospitalizations per 100,000 inhabitants, outperforming their male counterparts. It is interesting to note that the effect of women in power in Brazil was stronger in strongholds of President Jair Bolsonaro, who was infamous for not wearing a mask and being skeptical of vaccines.

Supriya Garikipati and Uma Kambhampati also conducted an analysis to determine if there was significant difference between women's handling COVID-19 pandemic as compared to men. Their findings show that COVID-death related outcomes were better in countries led by women across 194 nations. They even found that testing rates per 100,000 people are significantly higher in countries led by women, and still report fewer cases than countries led by men. Women were noted to have reacted quicker in enacting lockdowns and ensuring proper communication to the public once the pandemic hit. In the conclusion of the study, it was found that overall women-led countries handled the COVID-19 outbreak better, especially in countries with more affordable healthcare such as Germany.

=== Effect of women's representation on crime rates ===
The evidence that women in power have a positive influence is also highlighted by Lakshmi Iyer at al. through their paper on how political representation of women led to higher rates of crime reporting. They also found that women are willing to report crime in villages with female representation in the council. Moreover, the police force is more responsive to crimes against women in areas which have gender-based affirmative action policies.

=== Variation in federal domestic spending ===
One study found that about 9% more US federal spending is brought to districts who are represented by a woman as opposed to a man. The study found that the type of women who tend to get elected are often "better" politicians because they have to outperform men to be elected into office.

=== Legislation regarding women's rights ===
One study found that in Argentina, bills regarding violence against women, sexual harassment, reproduction, and gender quotas were introduced more often when a larger number of women were in chambers.

=== Effect of women's representation on public goods provision ===
A study also finds that the percentage of women in global legislatures promotes the substantive representation of women as it pertains to the provision of public goods and infrastructure development that women perceive to be important.

== By country ==
=== Africa ===
==== Benin ====
In the Kingdom of Dahomey (now Benin), women played a crucial role in pushing back against colonial oppressors. Warriors called agojie formed the only all-female army in modern history. Despite this powerful history, women have struggled to hold political power in Benin. Women attained the right to vote in 1960, and the first woman was voted into parliament in 1979.

Since the 2019 Electoral Code established 24 of 109 seats to be reserved for women, Benin has seen more female representation. In 2026, 28 seats were held by women in the National Assembly. President Romauld Wadagni appointed six women to his cabinet, including Elvire Toupé as the first female aide-de-camp, which the African Tribune described as "a significant milestone."

==== Cabo Verde ====
Uniquely, the Cabo Verde electoral law passed in 2019 mandates that the National Assembly, as well as city councils and municipal assemblies must have a minimum of 40% representation of both women and men. In 2026, 47% of the Assembly is represented by women. The National Assembly Speaker elected in June 2026 is Janira Almada.

==== Morocco ====
In September 2026, Morocco elected its first woman prime minister, Fatima Ezzahra El Mansouri, the previous mayor of Marrakesh. El Mansouri "pledged to expand women's participation in decision making, strengthen economic independence, and to combat violence against women." Currently women make up 27% of the 395-member House of Representatives and 11% of the 120-member House of Councillors. Women in Morocco received the right to vote in 1959, and the first woman was elected to parliament in 1993.

==== Namibia ====
Netumbo Nandi-Ndaitwah became the first woman president of Namibia in 2025, after serving as the third vice president under President Nangolo Mbumba. In 2026, the National Assembly is 42% female, and both the Speaker and Secretary General of the Assembly are women. The dominant political party in Namibia, the South West Africa People's Organisation (SWAPO), adopted gender parity requirements in 2014 that doubled women's representation in parliament.

==== Rwanda ====
In 2006, Rwanda became the first country to have a majority of women in legislature. Rwanda is an example of a developing country that radically increased its female leadership because of national conflict. After the 1994 Rwandan genocide that killed 800,000 Tutsis in 100 days, the percentage of women in the legislature went from about 18% before the conflict to 56% in 2008. Two pieces of legislature enabled and supported women into leadership positions: the Security Council Resolution of 1325 urged women to take part in the post-conflict reconstruction and the 2003 Rwandan Constitution included a mandated quota of 30% reserved seats for all women in the legislature. Of the 24 women who gained seats directly after the quota implementation in 2003, many joined political parties and chose to run again. Though it took almost 10 years, after implementing the gender quotas, Rwanda reached levels of female representation which are the highest in the world. Once again we can see the quota working as an "incubator" for driving women's participation in leadership.

It is argued that the increase in female leadership in Rwanda also led to an increase in gender equality. World Focus (2009) writes: "Rwandan voters have elected women in numbers well beyond the mandates dictated by the post-genocide constitution. And though women in Rwanda still face discrimination, female legislators have influenced major reforms in banking and property laws." A parliamentary women's caucus in Rwanda, the Rwanda Women Parliamentary Forum (FFRP) has also "led a successful effort to pass ground-breaking legislation on gender-based violence in part by involving and garnering support from their male colleagues".

While some researchers see reform, others see dominant party tactics. Shireen Hassim (2009) writes, "It could be argued that in both countries [Uganda and Rwanda] women's representation provided a kind of alibi for the progressive, 'democratic' nature of new governments that at their core nevertheless remained authoritarian, and increasingly so". Rwanda shows that increased participation by women in democracy is conducive to progress in gender equal legislature and reform, but research must be careful not to immediately relate increased gender equality in politics to increased gender equality in policies.

In 2026, women hold 63.8% of seats in the Rwandan parliament's Chamber of Deputies – still the highest in the world.

==== Tunisia ====
In 1957, women in Tunisia gained universal suffrage, and elected the first woman to parliament just two years later. In 2025, Sara Zaafarani was elected first woman prime minister. In 2026, however, only 15.8% of the members of the Assembly of People's Representatives are women, and just 11% of the National Council of Regions and Districts.

=== Asia ===
==== Afghanistan ====
After the Taliban was toppled in 2001 by the United States invasion of Afghanistan, Afghan women's political participation significantly improved. Afghan women worked in various layers of decision-making positions in the Government of Afghanistan. There were several women running as vice-presidential candidates in the presidential elections of Afghanistan in 2014. The proportion of seats held by women in the Parliament of Afghanistan increased from 4 percent in 1995 to 28 percent in 2018. There were four female cabinet ministers, and there are many Afghan women who were ambassadors, such as Roya Rahmani, Suraya Dalil, and Shukria Barekzai. There were hundreds of women working running private companies, non-profit organizations, and civil society organizations in Afghanistan.

Since the 2021 Taliban offensive, which overthrew the Islamic Republic of Afghanistan and re-established Taliban rule of Afghanistan, women's rights to political participation have contracted sharply. Women in Afghanistan is now considered the world's "most severe women's rights crisis." Women and girls have had most of their basic rights stripped away, barred from education, professions, and most of public life.

==== Azerbaijan ====
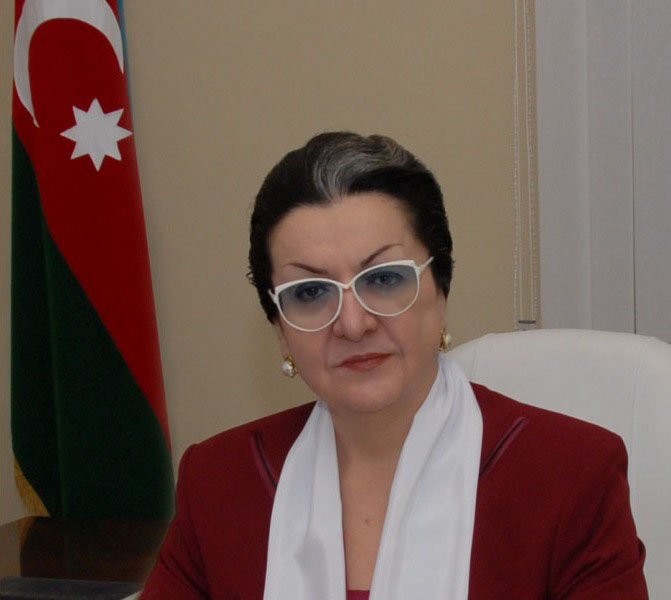
Azerbaijan's first female Secretary of State Lala Shevket at the office of Azerbaijan Liberal Party

In 1918, universal suffrage was introduced by the Azerbaijan Democratic Republic, thus making Azerbaijan the first Muslim-majority country and Turk-majority country to enfranchise women. In 2026, 26 women are members of the Azerbaijan Parliament (Milli Məclis). As of 2015, there were 21 women in the 125-seat parliament. The percentage of female members of parliament increased from 11 to 17 percent between 2005 and 2015. Traditional social norms and lagging economic development in the country's rural regions continued to restrict the role of women in the economy, and there were reports that women had difficulty exercising their legal rights due to gender discrimination.

In 2026, the National Assembly speaker is Sahiba Gafarova. Hijran Huseynova chairs the Committee on Family, Women and Children Affairs. As of May 2009, women held the positions of Deputy Chairman of the Constitutional Court, Deputy Chairman of the Nakhchivan AR Cabinet of Ministers, four Deputy Ministers, an Ambassador, and Ombudsmen of Azerbaijan and Nakhchivan AR. Women constituted 4 of the 16 members of the Central Election Commission and chaired 3 of the 125 district election commissions. Some notable female politicians in Azerbaijan include:

- Elena Stasova – world's first communist female president (chairman) during 1 week in 1919
- Ayna Sultanova – the first Azerbaijani female cabinet minister (People's Commissar of Justice) in 1938.
- Zuleykha Seyidmammadova – Minister of Social Security in 1952 and first female Azerbaijani military pilot.
- Sima Eyvazova – first non-Russian diplomat of USSR 1982, Minister of Foreign Affairs of Azerbaijan
- Sakina Aliyeva – first Azerbaijani female head of parliament 1963.
- Tahira Tahirova – Minister of Foreign Affairs of Azerbaijan 1959.
- Elmira Gafarova – Speaker of the National Assembly of Azerbaijan, and Minister of Foreign Affairs of Azerbaijan 1983
- Lydia Rasulova – was a Minister of Social Security (1988–1992), Minister of Education (1993–1997).
- Leyla Yunus – Chairman of Information and Analysis at the Center of Ministry of Defence.
- Lala Shevket – first female Secretary of State (1993–1994).
- Sudaba Hasanova – Minister of Justice 1995
- Mehriban Aliyeva – Vice President 2017, head of Heydar Aliyev Foundation.
- Maleyka Abbaszadeh – chair of the State Students Admission Commission 2000.
- Hijran Huseynova – chair of the State Committee for Family, Women and Children Affairs (2006–2026)
- Elmira Süleymanova – first Ombudsman 2002
- Ganira Pashayeva – member of the National Assembly of Azerbaijan 2005.
- Havva Mammadova – diplomat, Member of National Assembly of Azerbaijan.
- Leyla Aliyeva – director of International Dialogue for Environmental Action.
- Govhar Bakhshaliyeva – director of the Institute of Oriental Studies of the Russian Academy of Sciences.

==== Bangladesh ====
Women in Bangladesh gained the right to vote in 1937, although the vote is restricted to those who can read, who have an income and pay taxes. Sheikh Hasina was the nation's longest serving prime minister (1996-2001, 2009-2024); as of 2024, she was also the longest serving female prime minister worldwide. Khaleda Zia was Bangladesh's first woman prime minister, serving from 1991-1996 and 2001-2006.

In 2026, of the 350 members of Jatiya Sangsad, the Bangladeshi parliament, 57 (16%) were women. The Constitutional Act passed in 2011 reserves 50 seats for women, up from a previous quota of 45. These seats are distributed to parties in proportion to the number of votes they received in the previous election. Women meet enormous obstacles to running for office or participating in political life. According to Human Rights Watch:

Despite Bangladesh previously having two women prime ministers and many women participating in the 2024 student-led protests, women are still largely denied political participation. In the upcoming general elections, 30 out of the 51 political parties do not have any women candidates. Jamaat-e-Islami, an Islamist political group and one of Bangladesh’s two leading political parties, does not have a single woman candidate among its 276 nominations.

==== China ====
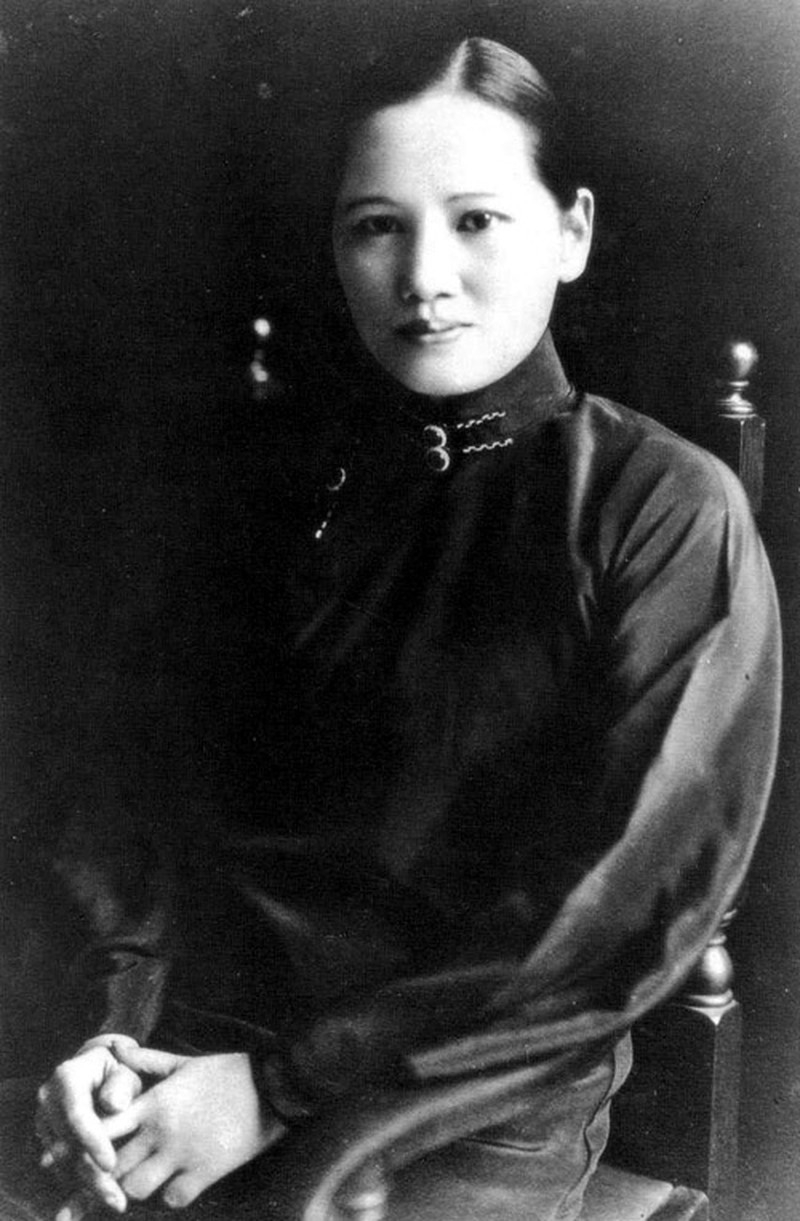
Soong Ching-ling, former Chinese Vice-president

In the 1954 Constitution, the Chinese Communist Party stated that men and women enjoy equal rights in the aspects of political, economic, cultural, social, and family dimensions, especially highlighting a legitimate voting right and the right to be elected. In the People's Republic of China's Law on the Protection of Rights and Interests of Woman, the Chinese Communist Party also outlined an official requirement of "appropriate number of women deputies", combined with the State's obligations to "gradually increase the proportion of the women deputies" and "actively train[s] and select[s] female cadres" in fundamental national institutions and political organizations. In the following decades, the Chinese Communist Party has revised its constitutional laws and State announcements to give recognition to women's role in the domain of governance. For example, the proclamation issued on the 5th meeting session of the 10th National People's Congress (NPC) stated that "the proportion of women delegates to be elected to the 11th People's Congress should be no less than 20%".

In spite of these declarations, the political system in China remains overwhelmingly male-dominated which, in turn, drives the low engagement rate of female delegates. Despite the new 13th NPC lineup including 742 women out of 2,980 representatives, about 24.9% of the total with a 1.5% increase from the prior term, there is little presence of women in the central power structure of major government organs and their political influence is vastly diminished as they climb up the political ladder. Only 33 women (9%) are recorded to have a seat at the table of the Central Committee for the election of members into the Politburo, a key cornerstone for the approval of all national affairs. In fact, except for the two consecutive offices in 1973 and 1977, the Central Committee has never witnessed over 10% of women engagement in the organization. Additionally, there was a decline in the number of women in the 25-member CCP Politburo from two down to one. In addition, the reappointment of Xi Jinping, General Secretary of the Chinese Communist Party, sparked controversy on the unbroken record of no-women Politburo Standing Committees and the absence of female top leaders in any legislature in China's political history, apart from Vice Premier Liu Yandong and Vice Foreign Minister Fu Ying. This contrasts with Hong Kong and Taiwan where female presidents – Carrie Lam and Tsai Ing-wen – took office in 2017 and 2016 respectively.

Men's domination of politics in China despite written protections for women's rights can be explained by the following underlying causes:

(1) Deprivation of upward mobility

While the implied prerequisite of national appointment is years of experience serving at middle-to-top management, women in the PRC government often struggle to obtain promotion to high-ranked positions, such as party secretary or principal governor. The reason contributing to the captioned phenomenon is gender division of labor across all levels of political structures. Contrary to Chairman Mao Zedong's saying that 'Women hold up half of the sky', Confucians principles' deeply ingrained advocacy "nan zhu wai, nu zhu nei" (men working on the outside, women's place remains on the inside) has shaped gender division of labor. Being assigned highly gender-biased responsibilities within the spectrum of 'women affairs', such as family planning that are reproduction-oriented or with connection to social construction, women's public role and scope of duty are framed under constraints. Women are, at the same time, missing the opportunities to keep a foothold in strategic national affairs, including but not limited to economic development, military planning and diplomatic involvement. The mentioned dilemma is reflected by an actual example in Ning Xiang County, Hunan Province. Women commonly maintain highest authority as head in women-related bodies, administering concerns on women's unfair treatments and suggesting for children's health development. By the same token, the gendered portfolio gives rise to empowerment of men in the political hierarchy. Consequently, with the lack of exposure to the exemplary official posts and the exclusive offering of key national assignments for men, women's upward mobility is aggravated, resulting in the substantially dwindling likelihood of taking residence in key leading positions.

(2) Biased retirement precondition prejudicing against women

In China, there is a discrepancy in the mandatory retirement age between men and women, in which men are entitled to enjoy 10 more years of work. This policy was established on the ground that women are primary and central support for domestic subjects and their early retirement (at the age of 50–55) would be beneficial to their overall family functioning. This discriminatory policy mirrors the cause in the previous part, in which the working capacity of women is restricted by the society's stereotype on their gender role and corresponding gender responsibilities. In addition, the average age of a Chinese chief in Central Committee is 56.1 years old; top leaders in Politburo were appointed at an average age of 61.1 years old; and the Standing Committee of Politburo has the highest average age of 63.4 for its office. All figures being examined, the aggregated average age of appointed leaders exceeds the legal retirement age of women in the nation, meaning that women are least likely to become the center of power before their career comes to an end.

(3) Anti-feminism

The conservative and politically sensitive Chinese government's censorship efforts have spread fear among feminist advocates. An illustrative case is the 2015 backlash against the 'Feminist Five' in China. For distributing stickers on Beijing subways, drawing the wider community's awareness to sexual harassment against women, the activists were subjected to interrogation, detention and month-long imprisonment. That was followed by the government's forced suspension of the Weibo account 'Feminist Voices'.

Since 2015, public awareness of gender equality has increased, with more women and LGBTQ+ voices coming forward about issues like domestic violence, harassment and discrimination. But the government has clamped down hard on gender advocacy in online platforms.

==== India ====
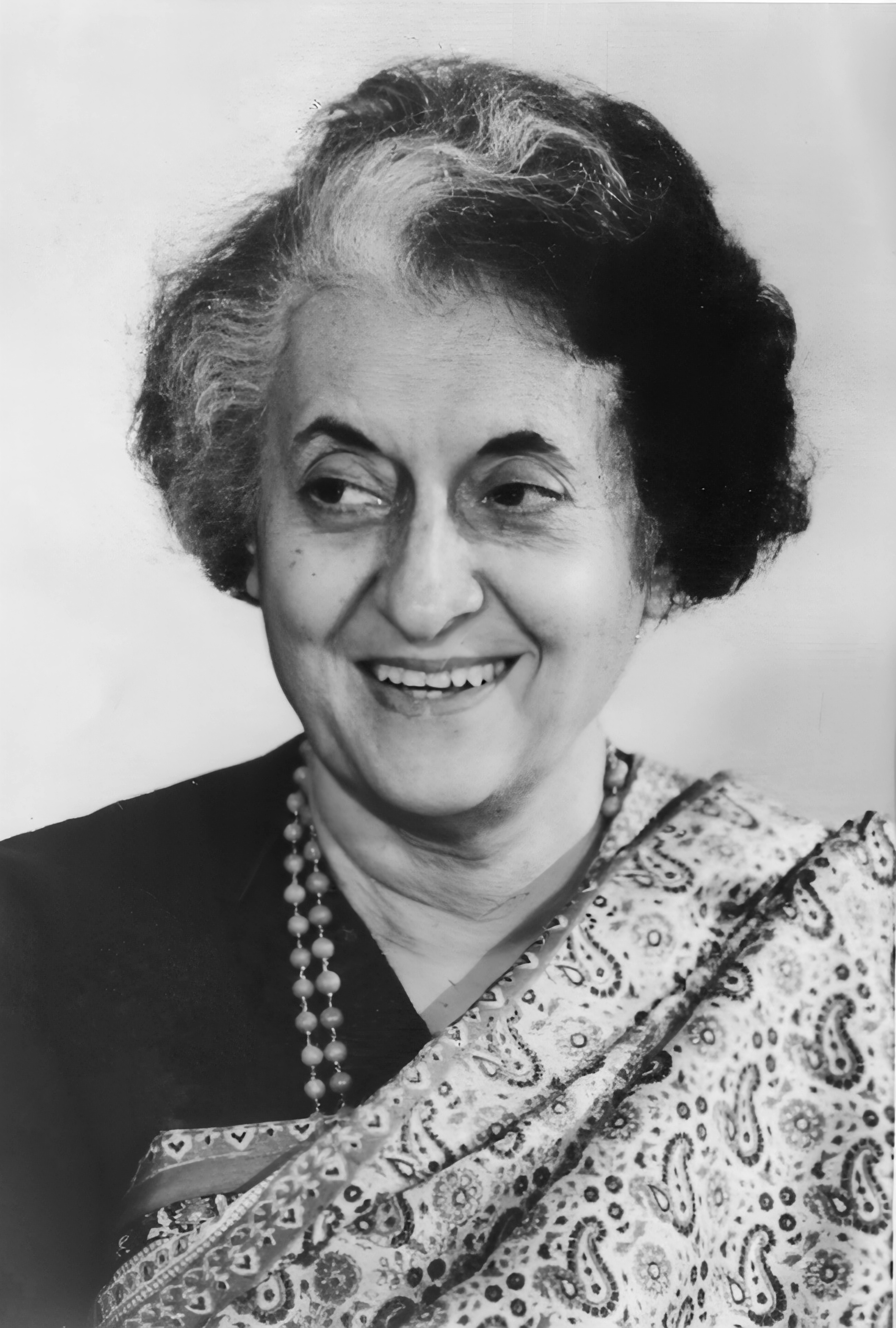
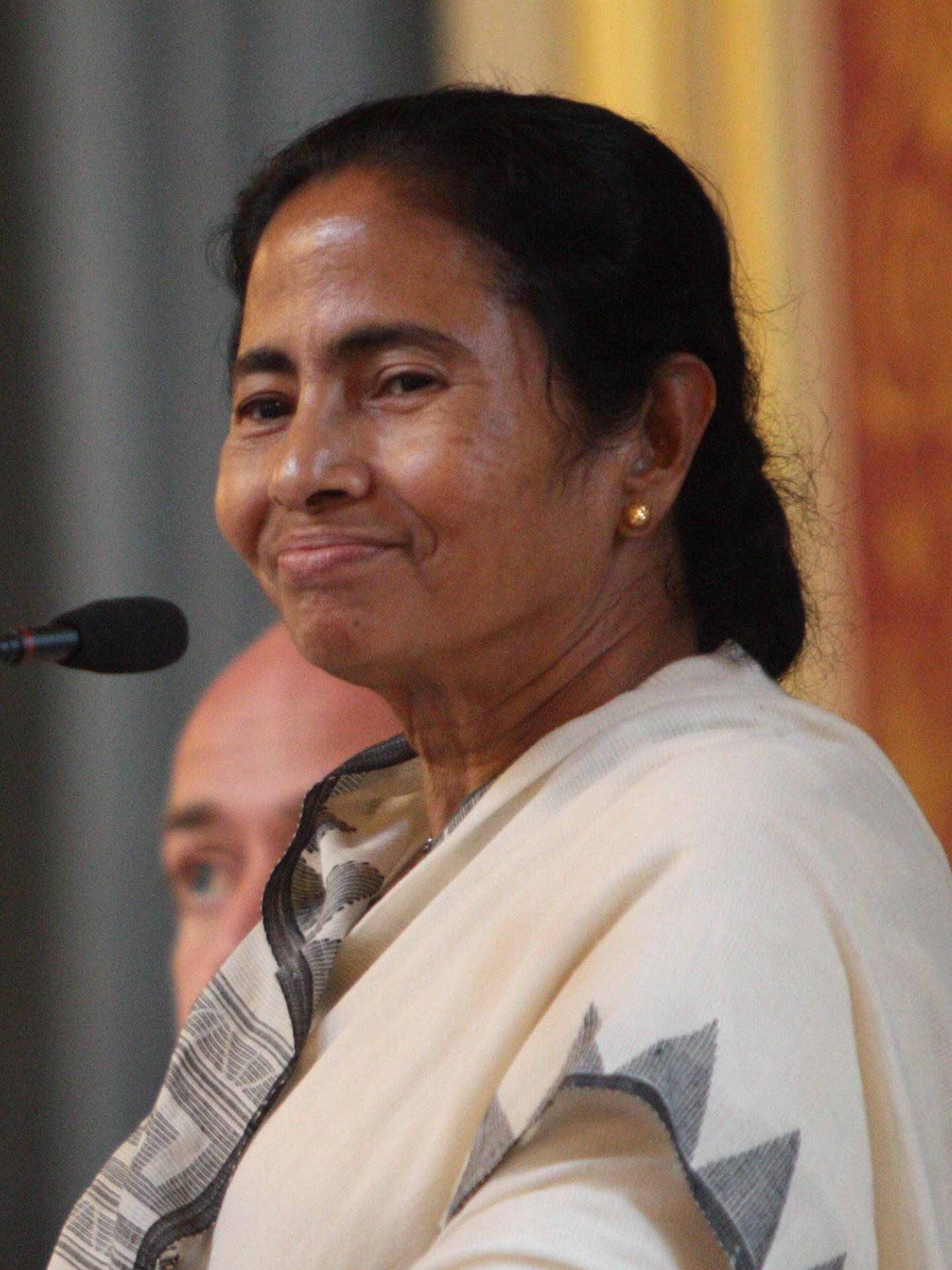
Female leaders in India:
- Indira Gandhi, first female prime minister of India
- Mamata Banerjee, former chief minister of West Bengal

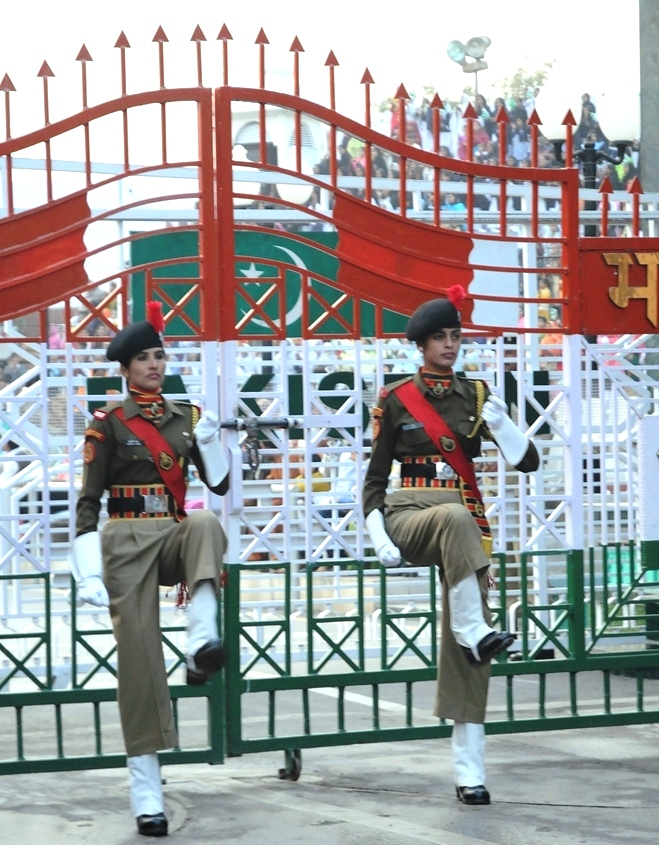
Female government employees in India (Border Security force)

Indira Gandhi was the first female prime minister of India. The daughter of Jawaharlal Nehru, the first prime minister of India, she served as prime minister from January 1966 to March 1977 and again from January 1980 until her assassination in October 1984, making her the second longest-serving Indian prime minister, after her father. Pratibha Patil was the first female president of India. She served as the 12th president of India from 2007 to 2012. Droupadi Murmu assumed office on 25 July 2022 as the 15th President of India. Sixteen women have served as the chief minister of an Indian state. As of 2026, one is in office — Rekha Gupta of Delhi.

Following the 2019 elections, the Lok Sabha has the highest ever representation of women at 14.3%, which includes 81 women MPs out of 543, higher than 62 in 2014.

===== Quota system =====
In an effort to increase women's participation in politics in India, a 1993 constitutional amendment mandated a randomly selected third of leadership positions at every level of local government to be reserved for women. These political reservation quotas randomly choose one third of cities to implement a women-only election. In these cities, parties are mandated to give a ticket to a woman candidate or choose to not run in those locations. Due to the randomized selection of cities who must enforce the reservation for women each election year, some cities have implemented the quota multiple times, once or never. This addresses the political discrimination of women at various levels: parties are forced to give women the opportunity to run, the women candidates are not disadvantaged by a male incumbent or general biases for male over female leadership, and the pool of women candidates is increased because of the guaranteed opportunity for female participation.

The effects of the quota system in India have been studied by various researchers. In Mumbai, it was found that the probability of a woman winning office conditional on the constituency being reserved for women in the previous election is approximately five times the probability of a woman winning office if the constituency had not been reserved for women". When the mandates are withdrawn, women have been able to keep their positions of leadership. Given the opportunity to get a party ticket, create a platform and obtain the experience to run for a political position, women who have participated in this system are more likely to be able to overcome these hurdles in the future. The quota system has also affected policy choices. Research in West Bengal and Rajasthan has indicated that reservation affected policy choices in ways that seem to better reflect women's preferences. In terms of voters' perception of female leaders, reservation did not change bias for or against female leaders; the relative explicit preference for male leaders was strengthened in villages that had experienced a quota. However, while reservation did not make male villagers inherently more sympathetic to the idea of female leaders, it caused them to recognize that women were able to lead. Moreover, the reservation policy (once enacted twice in the same village) significantly improved women's prospects in elections open to both genders moving forward. Political reservation for women has also positively impacted the aspirations and educational attainment for teenage girls in India.

Indian panchayats (local government)

The local panchayati raj system in India provides an example of women's representation at the local governmental level. The 73rd and 74th Constitutional Amendments in 1992 mandated panchayat elections throughout the country. The reforms reserved 33% of the seats for women and for castes and tribes proportional to their population. Over 700,000 women were elected after the reforms were implemented in April 1993. In 2026, women now make up about 50% of elected panchayat representatives nationwide, placing India in the top tier globally for local women leaders.

==== Israel ====
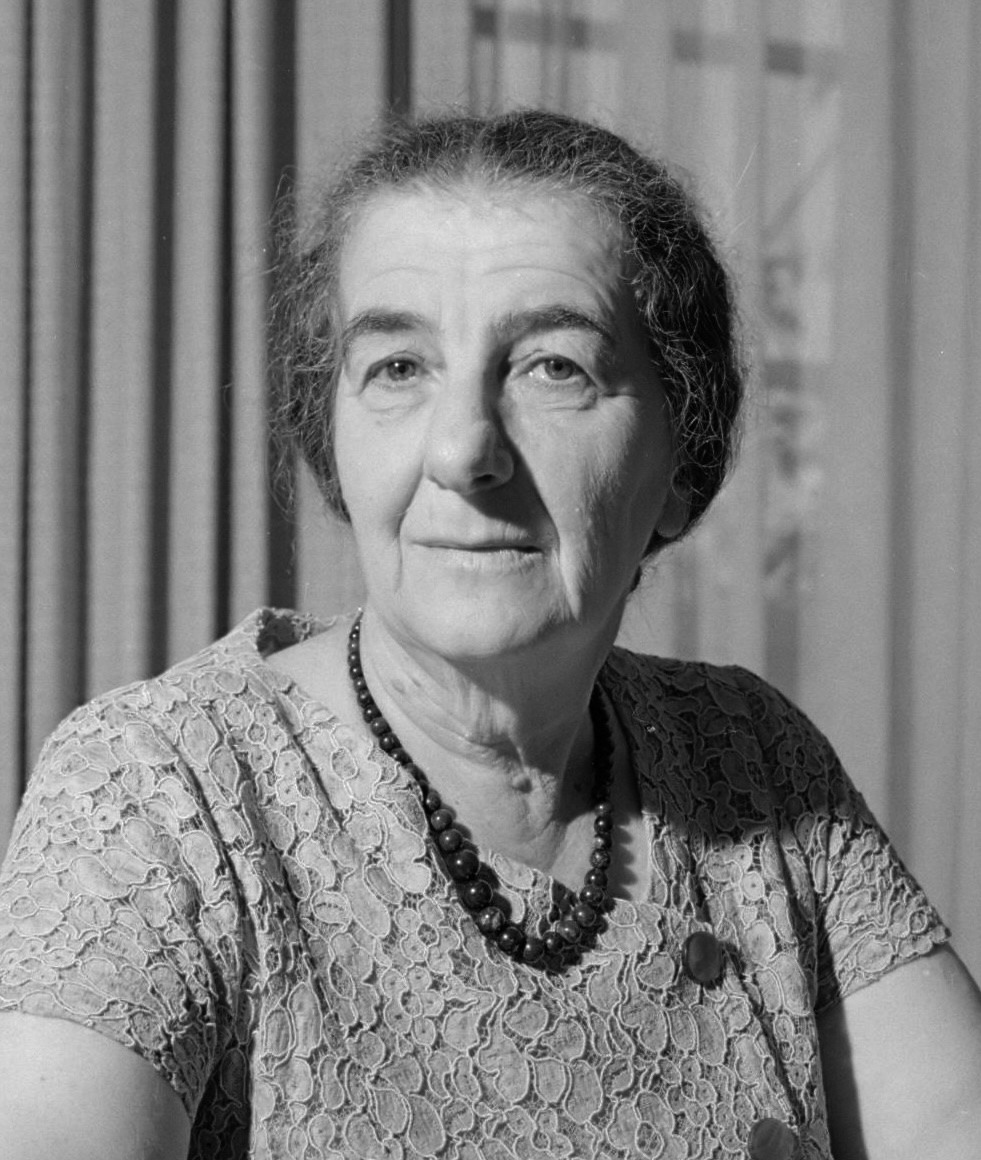
Golda Meir, the first woman prime minister of Israel

Since the founding of the State of Israel, relatively few women have served in the Israeli government, and fewer still have served in the leading ministerial offices. While Israel is one of a small number of countries where a woman—Golda Meir—has served as prime minister, it is behind most Western countries in the representation of women in both the parliament and government.

As of 2019, women comprised 25% of Israel's 120-member Knesset. By 2025, that number had only increased slightly to 26%. In March 2026, the Israel Democracy Institute noted that:

The impressive improvement in women's representation in the Knesset that was seen between 1999 and 2015 has halted in the past decade. This is true in government as well, where the representation of women is actually regressing rather than improving compared to the previous government, and is particularly low compared to other democracies.

==== Japan ====
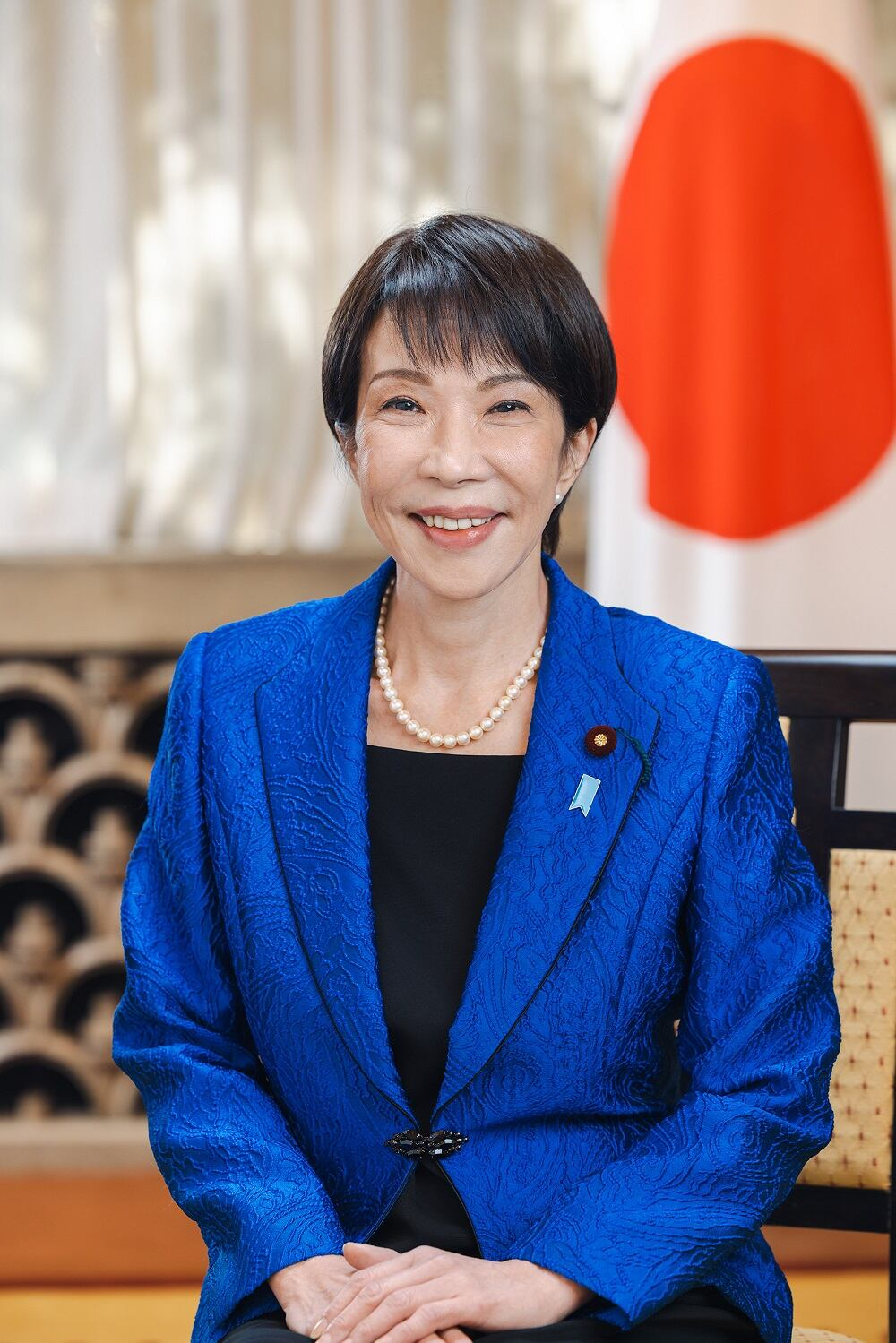
Sanae Takaichi, first woman Prime Minister of Japan

In October 2025, Sanae Takaichi became the first woman prime minister of Japan. Despite this milestone, Japan has been losing ground in female political representation over the last decade. In February 2026, there were 68 women (15%) in the House of Representatives, and 74 in the House of Councillors (30%), ranking them 148th worldwide for the number of women in parliament. This is a downward trajectory from 2013, when they ranked 122nd, with 39 women in the House of Representatives.

Despite the stated goal of then-Prime Minister Shinzō Abe to have "no less than 30 per cent of leadership positions in all areas of society filled by women by 2020," as of 2026, progress is still needed.

Since the enactment of the modern Japanese Constitution in 1947, Japanese women gained the right to vote, and the new version of the constitution also allows for a more democratic form of government that guarantees women equality under the law. The first female cabinet member, Masa Nakayama, was appointed as the Minister of Health and Welfare in Japan in 1960. Until 1994, the electoral system for the House of Representatives was based on a single non-transferable vote in multi-member districts. Part of the new system was not conducive to women's advancement in public office because it promoted contests between parties and rival candidates within the same party, but part was helpful to women candidates in that it reduced the role of money and corruption in elections. In Japanese politics, the kōenkai is a major factor for a successful outcome of an election. The kōenkai, or "local support groups", serve as pipelines through which funds and other support are conveyed to legislators and through which the legislators can distribute favors to constituents in return. Because gaining support from these groups is usually based on personal connections, women's historically disadvantaged position in networking circles hurts their ability to run for public office.

By 1996, Japan had implemented its 1994 electoral system for the House of Representatives that combined single-seat districts with proportional representation. Out of 480 seats, 300 were contested in single seat constituencies. The other 180 members were elected through allocations to an electoral list submitted by each party. Candidates who lacked a strong support system were listed on a party's proportional representation section. In the 2009 election, only two of eight female Liberal Democratic Party members were elected from a single-seat district, which indicated that few female candidates had enough political support to win a single-seat election.

==== Lebanon ====
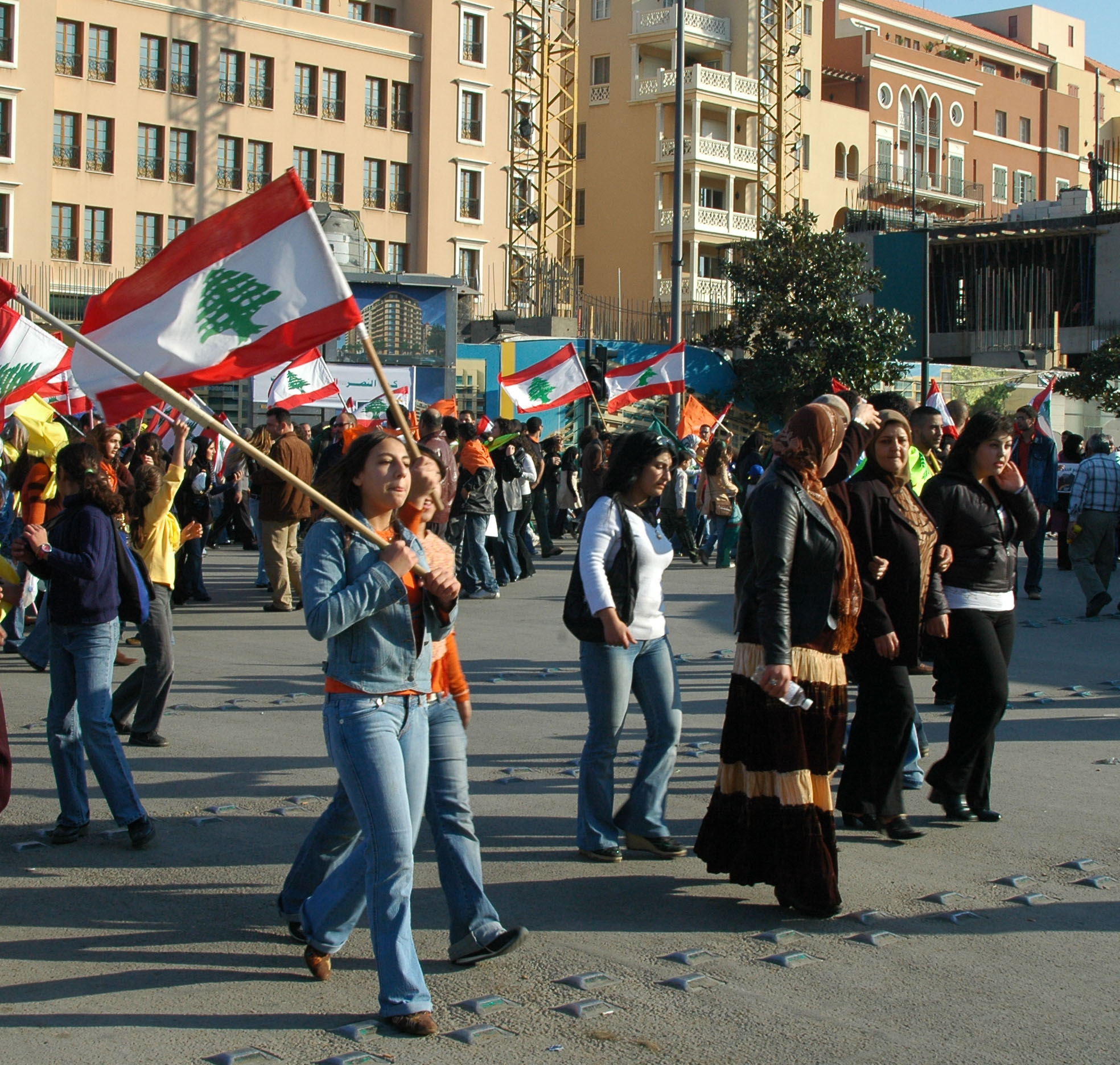
Lebanese women marching for their rights

Although women gained the right to vote in 1926 (at age 21 with proof of education), nearly a half century went by before Lebanon elected its first female official to parliament. In 1963, Mirna Boustany became the first woman to be elected to the national assembly in Lebanon. In 2022, eight women - a record number - were elected to that body of 128 members.

==== Myanmar ====
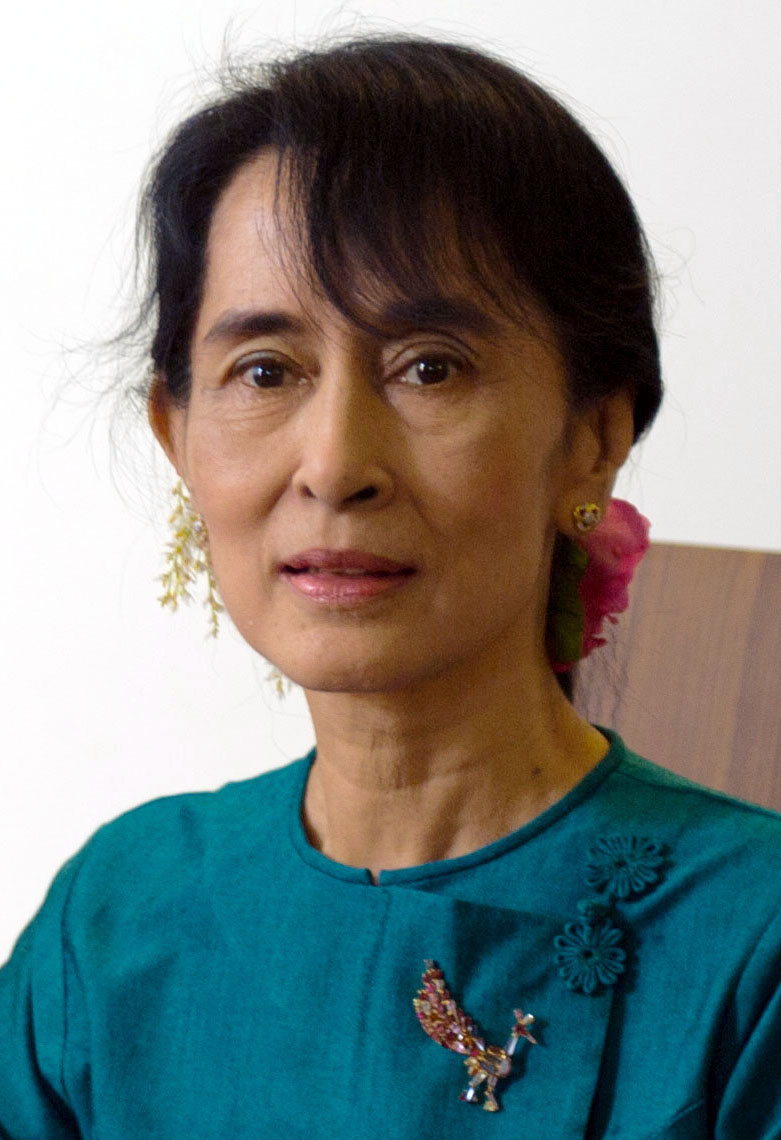
Aung San Suu Kyi, State Counsellor of Myanmar (from 2016 to 2021)

Aung San Suu Kyi is a Burmese politician and Nobel Peace Prize laureate (1991) who was the de facto head of the government of Myanmar from 2016-2021. She remained under house arrest for almost 15 years from 1989 to 2010, becoming one of the world's most prominent political prisoners.

Although she was prohibited from becoming the president due to a clause in the constitution – her late husband and children are foreign citizens – she assumed the newly created role of state counsellor, a role akin to a prime minister or a head of government. On 1 February 2021, Aung San Suu Kyi was arrested by the military during the 2021 Myanmar coup d'état after it declared the November 2020 Myanmar general election results fraudulent.

There has been no functioning parliament in Myanmar since this event in 2021.

==== Singapore ====
The 2025 Singapore general election saw a record number of women become lawmakers in Singapore's Parliament, with 31 (about 32% of the 97 seats) out of the 50 female candidates contesting elected into parliament. This is among the highest in each election compared to the 2020 election with 27 female MP-elects (29% of 93 seats) out of 40 female candidates contesting, in 2015 with 21 female MPs (24% of 89 seats) out of 35 female candidates contesting, and in 2011 with 19 female MPs (22% of 87 seats) out of 35 female candidates contesting. Furthermore, to date three Non-constituency MPs, one taken in 2006, one in 2011 and one in 2020, were taken by women.

==== Sri Lanka ====
While women have served in every Sri Lankan parliament to date, proportions have been low. Adeline Molamure became the first female parliamentarian when she was elected in 1931. Molamure went onto serve as the Deputy President of the Ceylonese Senate. The first woman minister in Sri Lankan history was Vimala Wijewardene who was appointed minister of health in 1956.

Sri Lanka saw the world's first elected woman national leader when the Sirimavo Bandaranaike-led Sri Lanka Freedom Party won the July 1960 Ceylonese parliamentary election in an era where the Sri Lankan government was headed by the prime minister. Sworn in as prime minister, Bandaranaike went on to hold two of the most prominent ministries, Defence and Foreign Affairs. Bandaranaike's election drew international media coverage to Ceylon, with newspapers speculating that they would have to create a new word, stateswoman, to describe her. Bandaranaike served three terms as prime minister and was the longest-serving prime minister in Sri Lankan history, serving a total of 18 years in office. Bandaranaike also played a formative role in the modern state of Sri Lanka; it was under her tenure that Sri Lanka became a republic, removing the British monarch as its head of state.

Bandaranaike's daughter, Chandrika Kumaratunga, held the post of prime minister, as deputy head of government for two months, before successfully contesting the 1994 Sri Lankan presidential election, becoming the nation's first female head of state. Kumaratunga also appointed her mother Sirimavo Bandaranaike as prime minister, marking the first time a woman succeeded a woman as prime minister, and the first time any nation had a female president and prime minister.

Sri Lanka has seen a multitude of female Cabinet ministers, including the minister of transport, Pavithra Devi Wanniarachchi.

Sri Lanka has also seen glass ceilings shattered in local government. The 10th governor of the Central Province, Niluka Ekanayake was the first LGBT person and transgender woman to hold the office of governor in Sri Lanka. She is widely considered to be the first openly transgender head of a government in the world. The first woman mayor of the capital, Rosy Senanayake was elected in 2018. While Sri Lanka has a long and varied history of woman leaders, female representation in Parliament is still lower than hoped for. In 2016, the government passed legislation mandating that 25% of Parliamentary seats be reserved for women. In 24 September 2024, Sri Lanka elected its current and third female prime minister, Harini Amarasuriya.

==== Taiwan ====
The constitution, adopted in 1947, protected female candidates in elections during the Mainland Period. Article 134 states: "In the various kinds of elections, quotas of successful candidates shall be assigned to women; methods of implementation shall be prescribed by law". The female representation rate in the Legislative Yuan and local councils has steadily increased above 30%.

Tsai Ing-wen won the 2016 president election and became the first female president.

==== Thailand ====
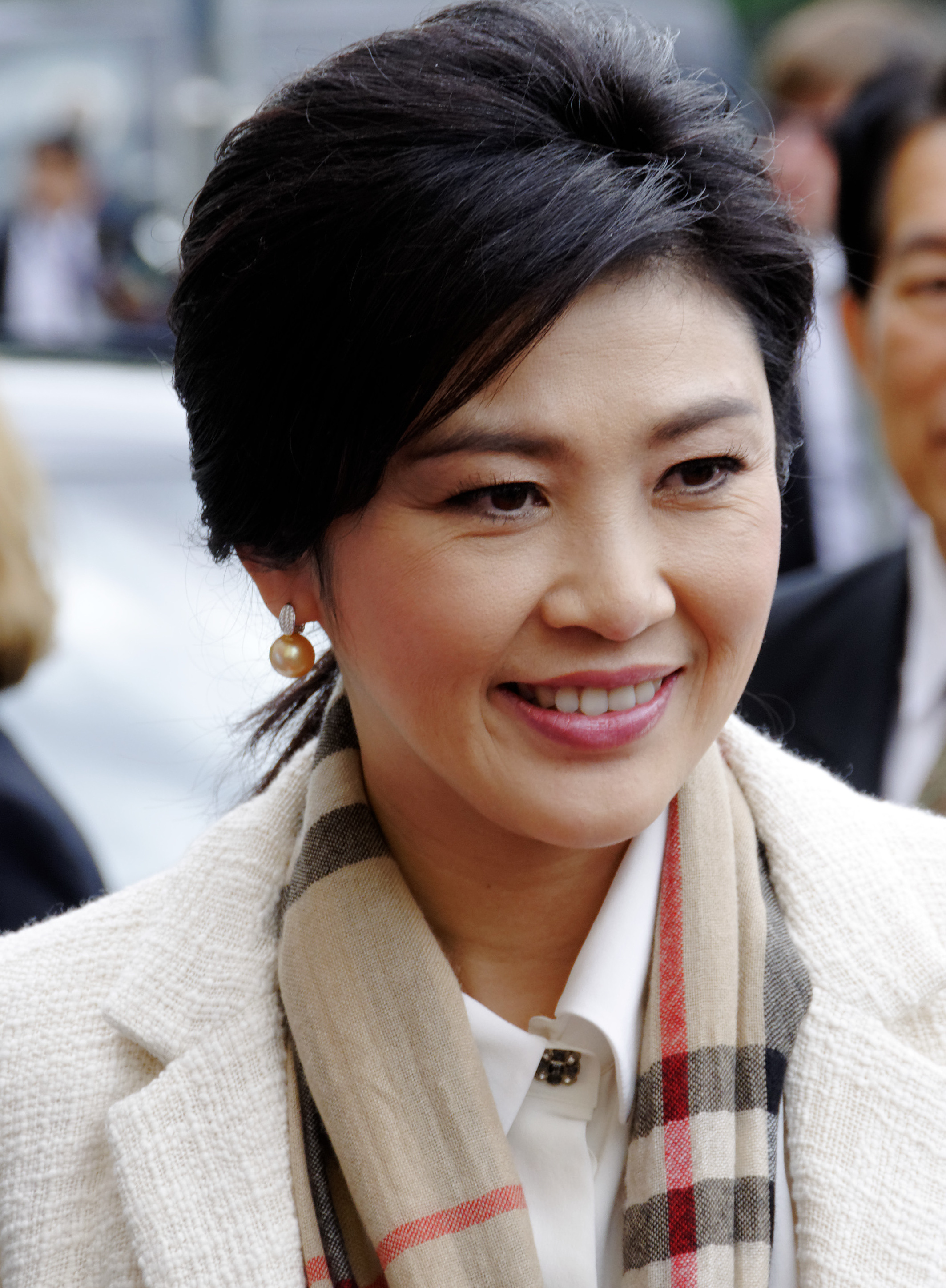
Yingluck Shinawatra, first female Prime Minister of Thailand

Thailand's first female prime minister Yingluck Shinawatra, who was elected as 28th prime minister of Thailand in 2011, was the youngest prime minister in over 60 years. She was removed from office on May 7, 2014, by a constitutional court decision. Following the removal of Srettha Thavisin, Paetongtarn Shinawatra has served as the second female prime minister of Thailand since 2024.

==== Turkey ====
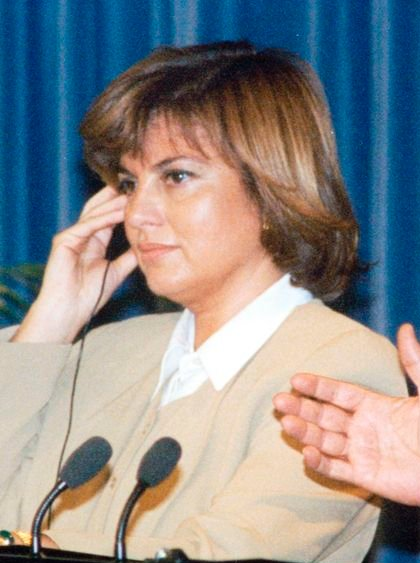
Tansu Çiller is the first and only female prime minister of Turkey.

Tansu Çiller, a career professor of economics since 1983, entered politics in November 1990, joining the conservative True Path Party (DYP). On 13 June 1993, she was elected the party's leader, and on 25 June the same year, Çiller was appointed the prime minister of a coalition government, becoming Turkey's first and only female prime minister to date. She served at this post until 6 March 1996.

The office of prime minister was abolished in Turkey in 2018. However, since 1995, the number of women in the parliament has been continually on the rise. Female representation rate did not fall below 10 percent after the 2007 elections.

Turkey's first female governor was Lale Aytaman. Aytaman, who served as the governor of Muğla between 1991 and 1995, was appointed to this position by President Turgut Özal. Meanwhile, Turkey's first female district governor is Özlem Bozkurt Gevrek. She served in the Orta district of Çankırı in 1995. After these years, the number of female governors and district governors increased rapidly.

=== Europe ===
==== Germany ====
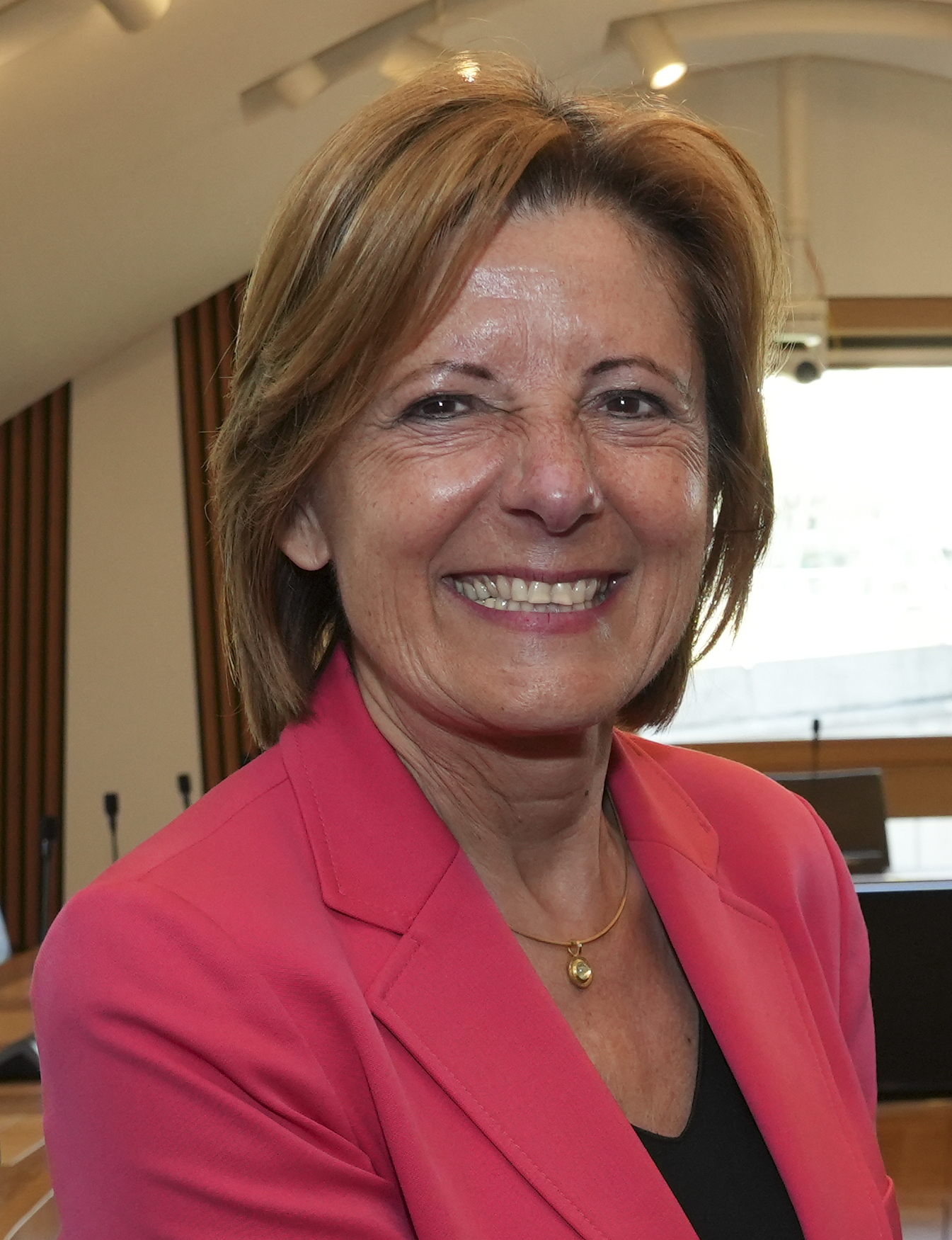
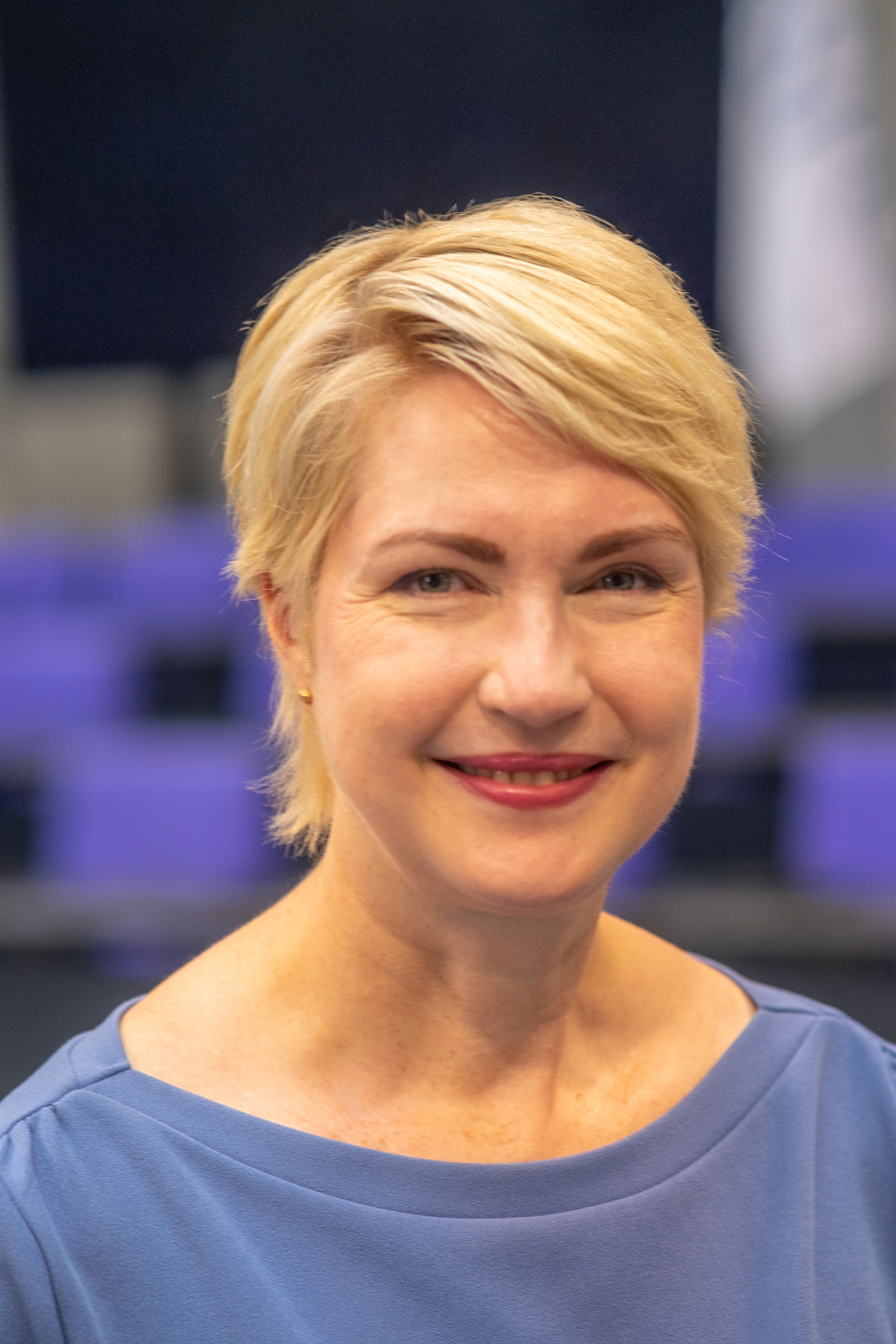
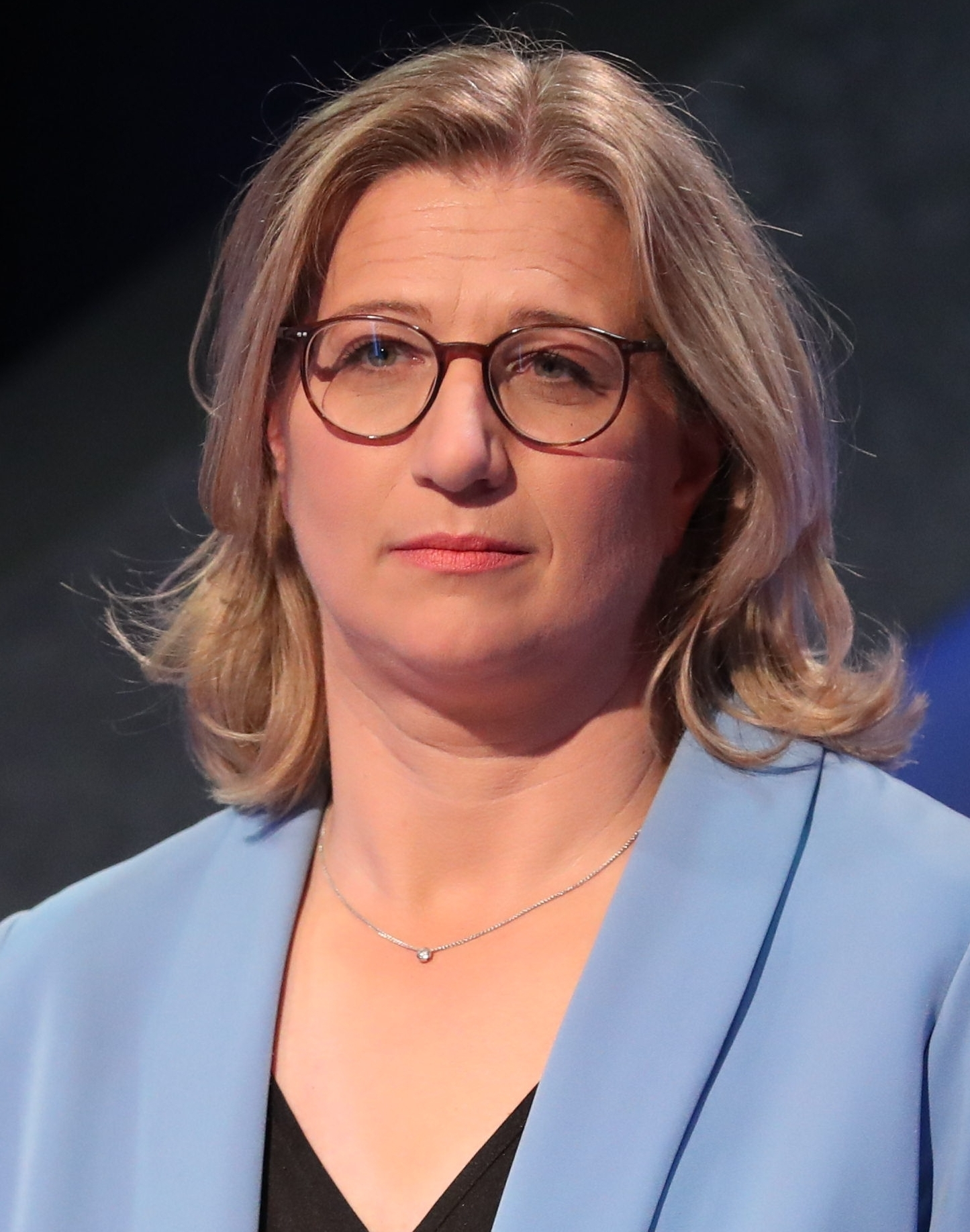
Minister-Presidents in Germany:
- Malu Dreyer, Minister-President of Rhineland-Palatinate
- Manuela Schwesig, Minister-President of Mecklenburg-Vorpommern
- Anke Rehlinger, Minister-President of the Saarland

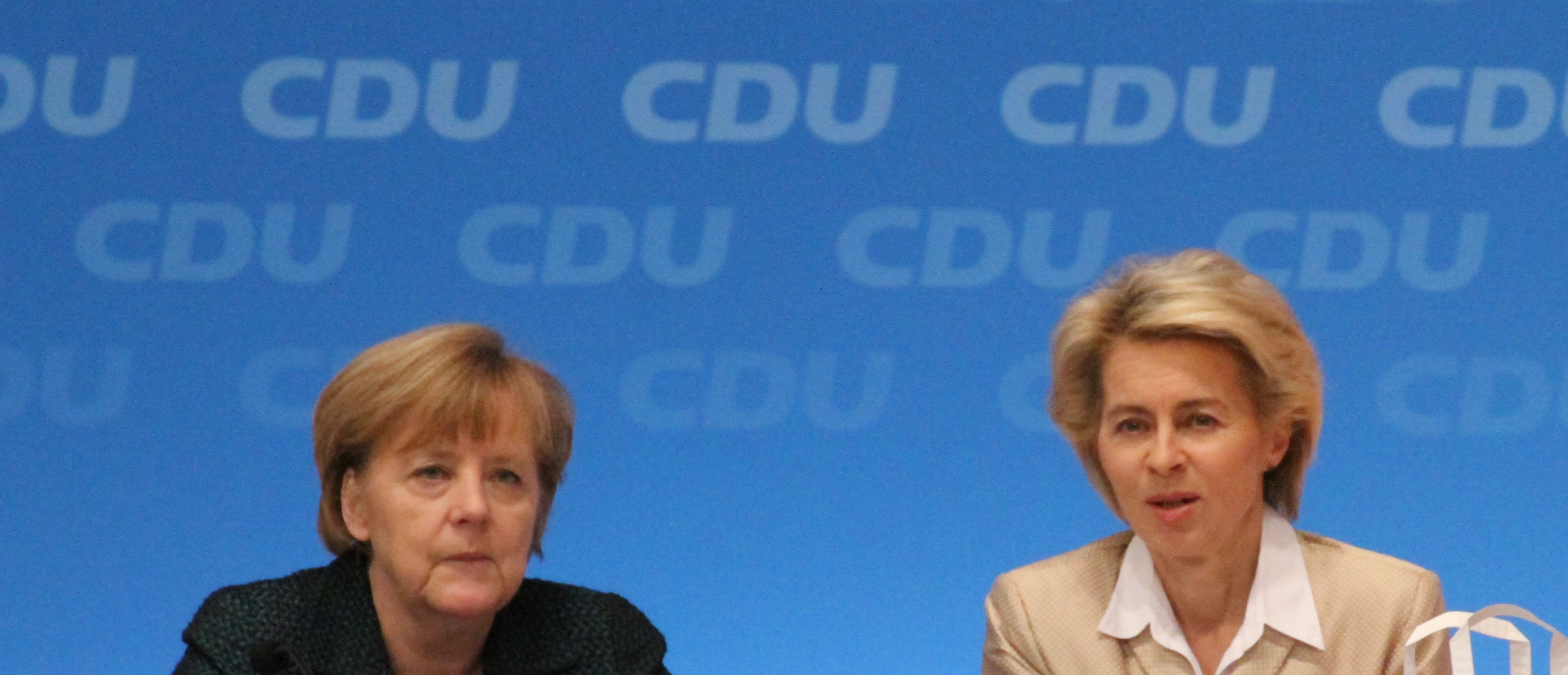
Angela Merkel, first woman Chancellor of Germany and Ursula von der Leyen, first woman Minister of Defence of Germany, later, first woman president of the European Commission

The gender quotas implemented across parties in Germany in the 1990s serve as a natural experiment for the effect of sub-national party political gender quotas on women participation. Davidson-Schmich (2006) notes, "the German case provides the variance needed to explain the successful (or failed) implementation of these political party quotas". Germany's sixteen state legislatures, the Länder, feature a variety of party systems and varied numbers of potential female candidates. Germany is rated highly in its gender gap, but is an example of a developed country with a low percentage of female leadership in politics. Davidson-Schmich's study shows that there are many factors that influence how effective a political quota for women will be. Because Germany's quotas cover culturally diverse areas, Davidson-Schmich was able to see which cities best responded to the increase in women running for office. In her bivariate study, the quota was more successful when the city had a PR electoral system, when more women held inner-party and local political offices, and when there were more women in state-level executive offices. The quota was less successful in rural areas, areas with a large number of Catholic voters, electoral systems with a preferential system, in extremely competitive party systems, and with greater rates of legislative turnover. In her multivariate study of these regions, however, Davidson-Schmich narrowed these factors down even further to the most significant variables of: Catholicism and agricultural economics (Davidson-Schmich, 2006, p. 228). This is very intriguing, and as she explains, "the success of voluntary gender quotas in the German states hinged not on the political structure of these Lander, but rather the willingness of within the system to act on the opportunities inherent in these structures" (Davidson-Schmich, 2006, p. 228). Social factors and inherent gender discrimination are more important in the success of a female political quota than the structure of the quota itself.

==== Ireland ====
In 1990, Mary Robinson was elected as the first female president of Ireland. The second female head of state, Mary McAleese, was president between 1997 and 2011.

The first woman elected to the Dáil was Constance Markievicz in 1918. (Directly prior to this, in the general election of 1918, she became the first woman elected to the House of Commons of the United Kingdom. In line with Sinn Féin abstentionist policy she did not take her seat there).She was appointed Minister for Labour in 1919, the first woman Cabinet minister in Western Europe. Six decades with all-male Cabinets would elapse before the appointment of the next woman minister in 1979, Máire Geoghegan-Quinn. Between 1919 and 2019, 19 women served as Cabinet ministers in Ireland, comprising 10% of those who have held senior ministerial positions.

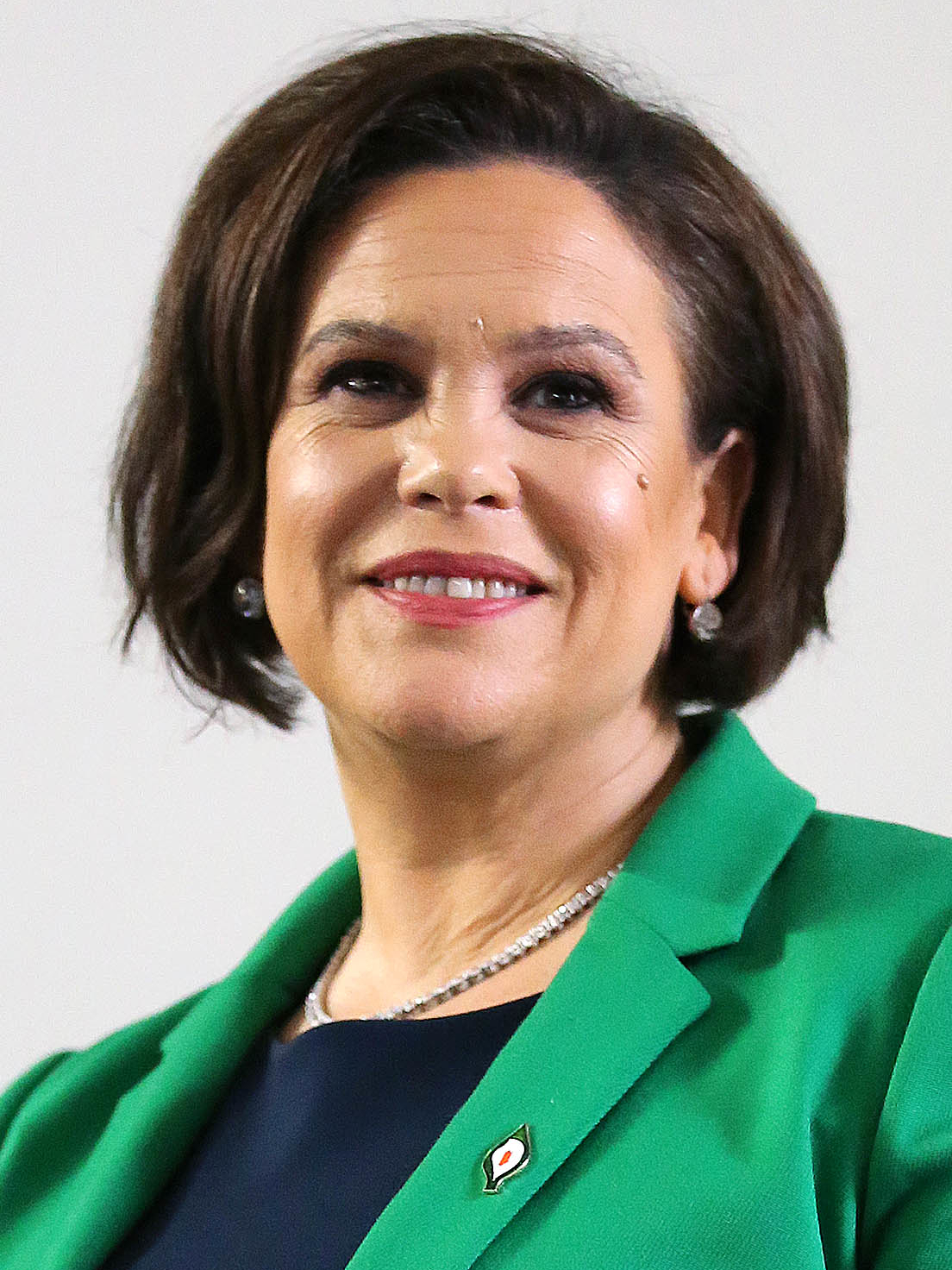
Mary Lou McDonald, Leader of the Opposition (Ireland)

As yet, the highest office attained by women is Tánaiste, that is, deputy prime minister. Four women have served as Tánaiste—Mary Harney (1997–2006), Mary Coughlan (2008–2011), Joan Burton (2014–2016) and Frances Fitzgerald (2016–2017).

Following the 2011 Irish general election and a re-shuffle in 2014, four women were appointed cabinet ministers (the highest number of women in senior ministerial positions ever in Ireland): Joan Burton, Frances Fitzgerald, Jan O'Sullivan and Heather Humphries.

Between 1918 and 2021, 131 women have been elected to Dáil Éireann.

Women remain a small minority of political office-holders in Ireland. The main factors are the role of traditional Catholicism in Irish political culture and the role of localism in party politics. Ann Marie O'Brien has studied the women in the Irish Department of External Affairs associated with the League of Nations and United Nations, 1923–1976. She finds that women had greater opportunities at the UN.

Following Micheál Martin's appointment as Taoiseach in June 2020, after the formation of a Fianna Fáil, Green Party and Fine Gael coalition, Sinn Féin's president Mary Lou McDonald became Leader of the Opposition. She is the first woman to occupy that position and the first to come from a party other than Fianna Fáil or Fine Gael since the Labour Party's Thomas Johnson in 1927.

==== Italy ====
Since the institution of the Italian Republic in 1946, women's right to vote and participate in public institutions has been recognized. According to article 51 of the Italian Constitution, "Citizens of one or the other sex are eligible for public offices and for elective positions under equal conditions, according to the rules established by law. To this end, the Republic adopts specific measures in order to promote equal chances for men and women." Nevertheless, only 21 women were elected, among the 556 members of the Constituent Assembly. In the years that followed, the percentage of women inside both chambers of the Parliament remained quite low.

The first woman to be appointed as secretary of state was Christian Democrat Angela Maria Guidi Cingolani in 1951. She served as Secretary of State to the Minister of Industry and Commerce until 1953. In 1976, Christian Democrat Tina Anselmi was appointed by Prime Minister Giulio Andreotti as the Minister for Labour and Social Security. This made her the first woman to hold a ministerial position in the Italian government.

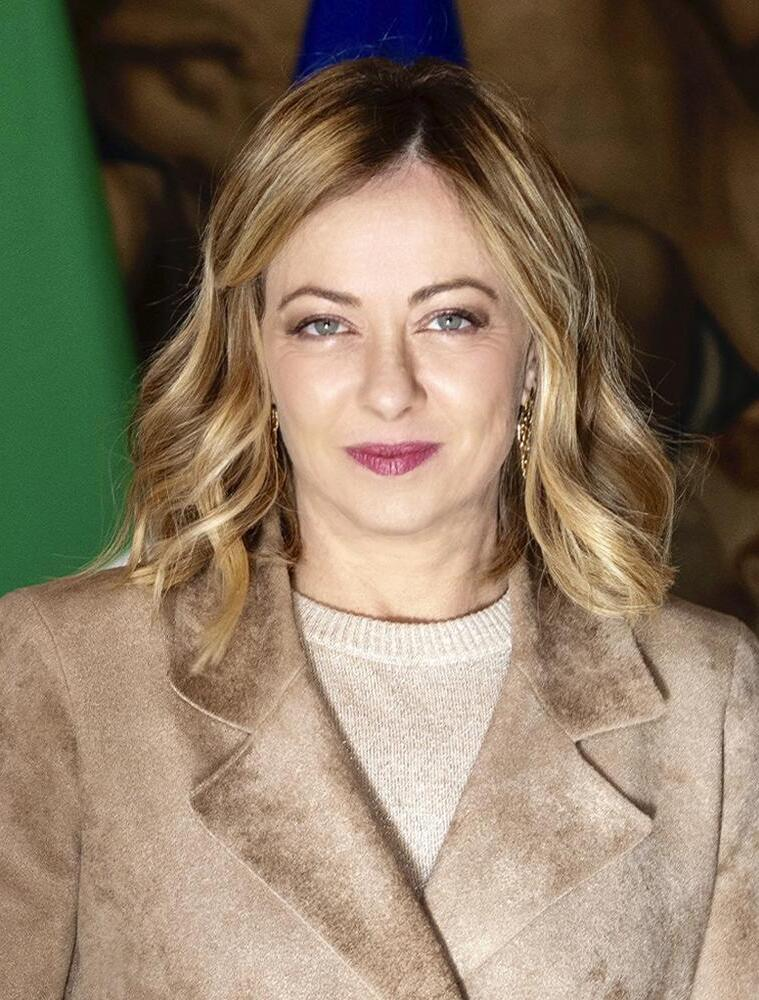
Giorgia Meloni, the first woman prime minister of Italy

In 1979, Italian Communist Nilde Iotti, was elected Chambers of Deputies president, becoming the first woman to hold one of the 5 great offices of the state.

In 2014 Renzi cabinet was the first Italian government in which the number of female ministers was equal to the number of male ministers, excluding the prime minister. After 2018 Italian general election 35% of lawmakers of both chambers of the parliament were women, reaching the highest level in Italian history. In 2018, Maria Elisabetta Alberti Casellati, member of Forza Italia party, was elected Senate president, becoming the first women to serve in the second highest office of the state. In 2019, Marta Cartabia became the first woman to serve as Constitutional Court president.

After the 2022 Italian general election and the victory of the centre-right coalition, President Sergio Mattarella appointed Brothers of Italy leader Giorgia Meloni as Prime Minister of Italy. Giorgia Meloni was sworn in on October 22, 2022, becoming the first-ever female head of government in Italy.

==== Netherlands ====
In 2016, the Dutch government achieved their goal for women in top jobs within the government. A 30% female share was achieved two years earlier than anticipated.

In business, the number of women in top jobs is behind in the political sector. In 2013, the listed companies inserted a 'one in three' rule, which meant that of every three top jobs, one must be exerted by a woman. Not long after, it turned out companies did not put much effort in to achieving this goal, as in practice even less than one in every ten top jobs was occupied by women. The goal for women in top jobs was postponed to 2023. The government and business sector agreed that if every one in five top jobs is not exerted by women, after 2018 the 30% rule will become mandatory.

Meanwhile, women's quota received a fair share of criticism. It has been argued that women should be employed based on their own qualities, not because of their gender.

==== Nordic countries ====
The Nordic countries have been forerunners in including women in the executive branch. The second cabinet Brundtland (1986–1989) was historical in that 8 out of 18 cabinet members were women, and in 2007 the second cabinet Stoltenberg (2005–2013) was more than 50% women. In 2003, Finland had a historical moment when all top leaders of the country were women and also represented different political parties: Social democrat Tarja Halonen was president, Riitta Uosukainen from National Coalition Party was Speaker of the Parliament and after the parliamentary elections of 2003 Anneli Jäätteenmäki from Center party was on her way to become the first female Prime Minister of Finland. Between 2007 and 2011 the Finnish cabinet was 60% female, with a female prime minister from 2010 to 2011. Between 2014 and 2015 the Finnish cabinet was 59% female. On June 22, 2010 Mari Kiviniemi of the Centre Party was appointed the second female prime minister of Finland. The present Danish government is a coalition between the Social Democrats, the Social-Liberal Party and the Socialist People's Party. All three parties have female leaders. Helle Thorning-Schmidt is prime minister.

==== Finland ====
The Finnish national quota law, introduced in 1995, mandates that among all indirectly elected public bodies (at both a national and a local level), neither sex in the governing body can be under 40%. The 1995 laws was a reformed version of a similar 1986 law. Unlike other countries' quota laws, which affect party structure or electoral candidate lists, the Finnish law addresses indirectly elected bodies (nominated by official authorities)—the law does not address popularly elected bodies. The Finnish law heavily emphasizes local municipal boards and other subnational institutions. From 1993 (pre-quota law) to 1997 (post-quota law), the proportion of women on municipal executive boards increased from 25% to 45%. The quota law also affected gender segregation in local governance: before the passage of the law, there had been a gender imbalance in terms of female overrepresentation in "soft-sector" boards (those concerned with health, education, etc.) and female "underrepresentation" in "hard-sector" boards (those concerned with economics and technology). In 1997, the boards were balanced horizontally. However, areas not subject to quota laws continue to be imbalanced. In 2003, it was determined that only 16% of the chairs of municipal executive boards are female—chair positions in this area are not quota-regulated. Presidential elections were held in Finland on 16 January 2000, with a second round on 6 February; the result was a victory for Tarja Halonen of the Social Democratic Party, who became the country's first female president.

==== Romania ====
No political gender quotas exist in Romania; however, the Equality Act of 2002 provides that public authorities and institutions, political parties, employers' organizations and trade unions must provide an equitable and balanced representation of men and women at all decisional levels. Following the 2016 elections, women gained only 20.7% of seats in the Lower House (Romanian Chamber of Deputies) and 14.7% in the Upper House (Senate of Romania). These figures are up from the 4.9% of women in the Romanian Parliament in 1990. On the other hand, women are well represented in the central public administration, including the Government, with more than half of decision-making positions held by women, according to a 2011 study commissioned by the Ministry of Labor. Viorica Dăncilă was the prime minister of Romania from 29 January 2018 to 4 November 2019. She was the first woman in Romanian history to hold the office of prime minister.

==== Spain ====
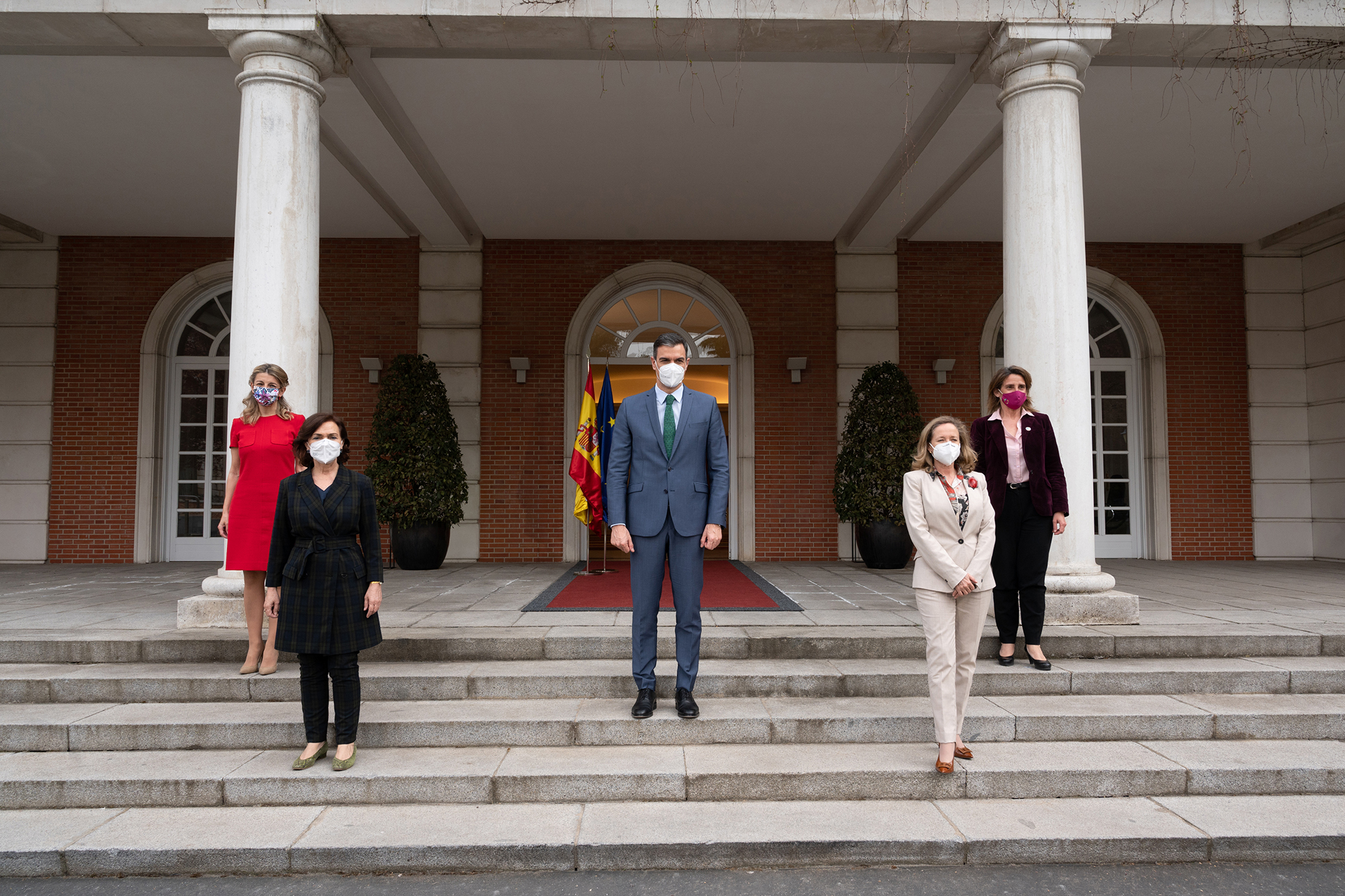
Prime Minister of Spain and the four deputy prime ministers, March 2021

In 2007, Spain passed the Equality Law, requiring a "principle of balanced presence" by mandating political parties to include 40–60% of each sex among electoral candidates. This law is unique in that surpasses the 40% parity figure established by the European Commission in 1998; a figure which (according to the EC) indicates "parity democracy." Though there is anecdotal evidence of increasing female representation on a local and national level, there has not yet been national-level data to quantitatively bolster this assertion.

On 6 June 2018, Pedro Sánchez, the leader of the Spanish Socialist Party, presented his cabinet which included eleven women and six men, making it the cabinet with the highest proportion of women in the world at the time. This proportion was increased after a cabinet reshuffle on 12 July 2021.

==== United Kingdom ====
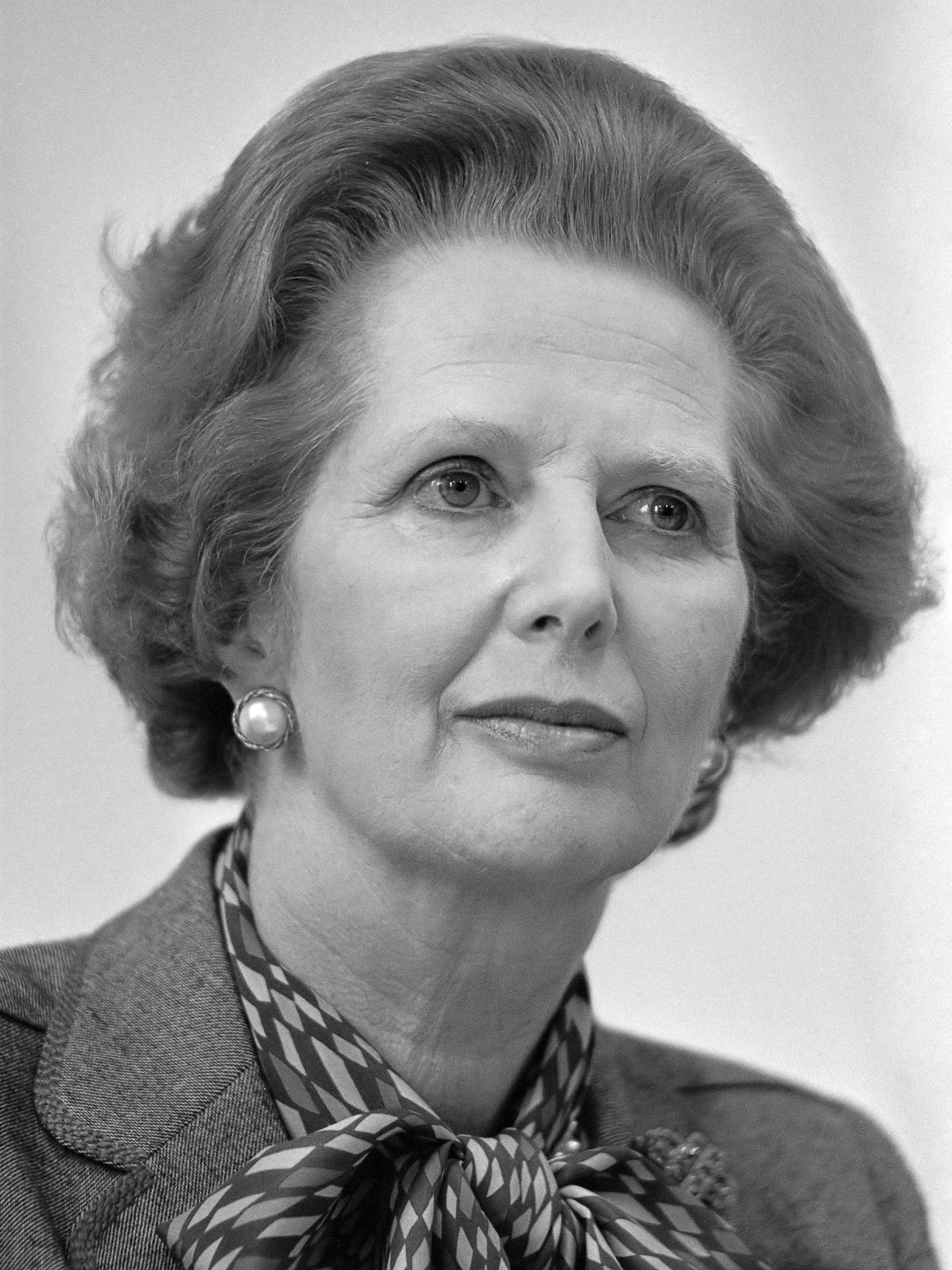
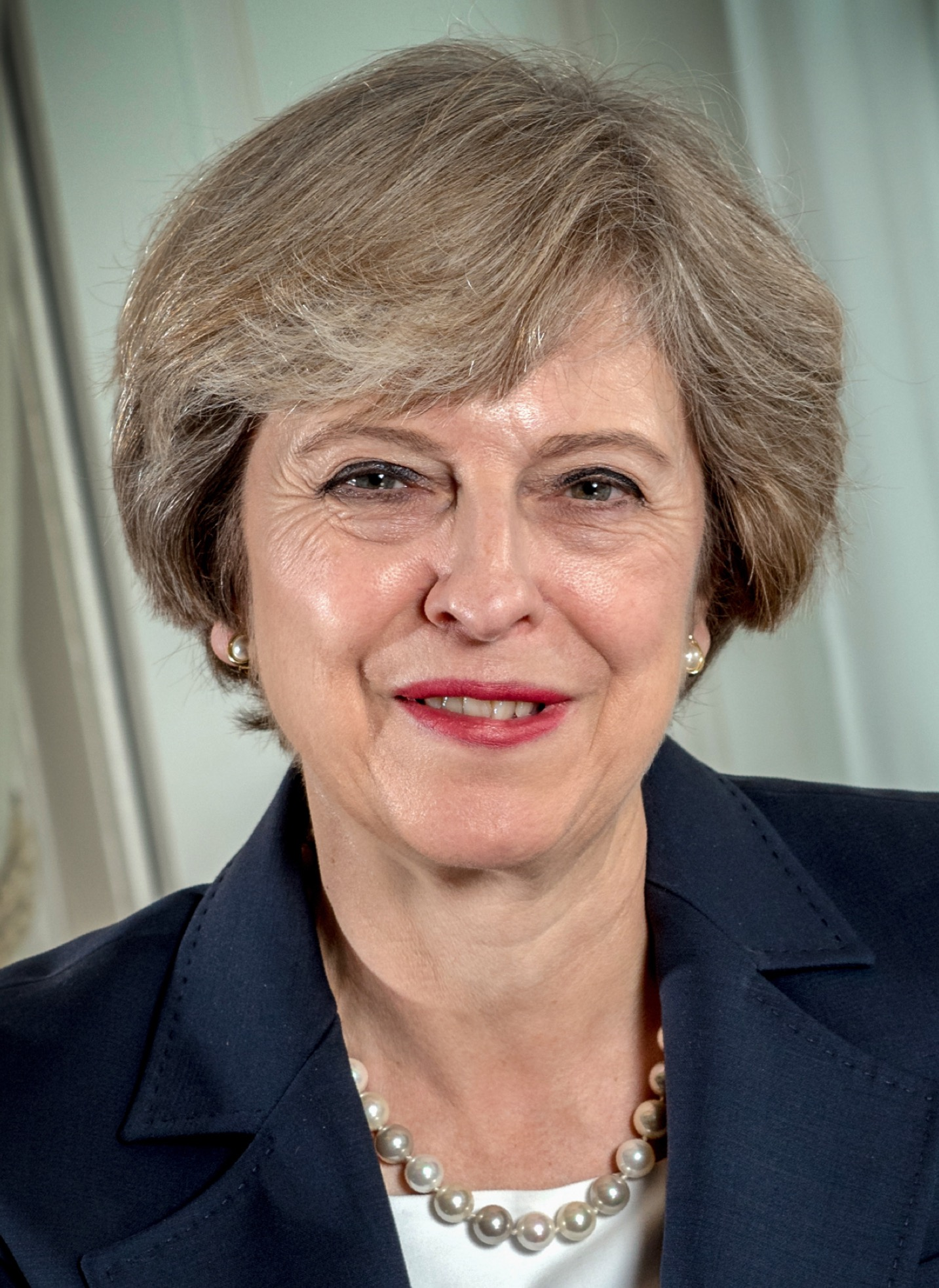
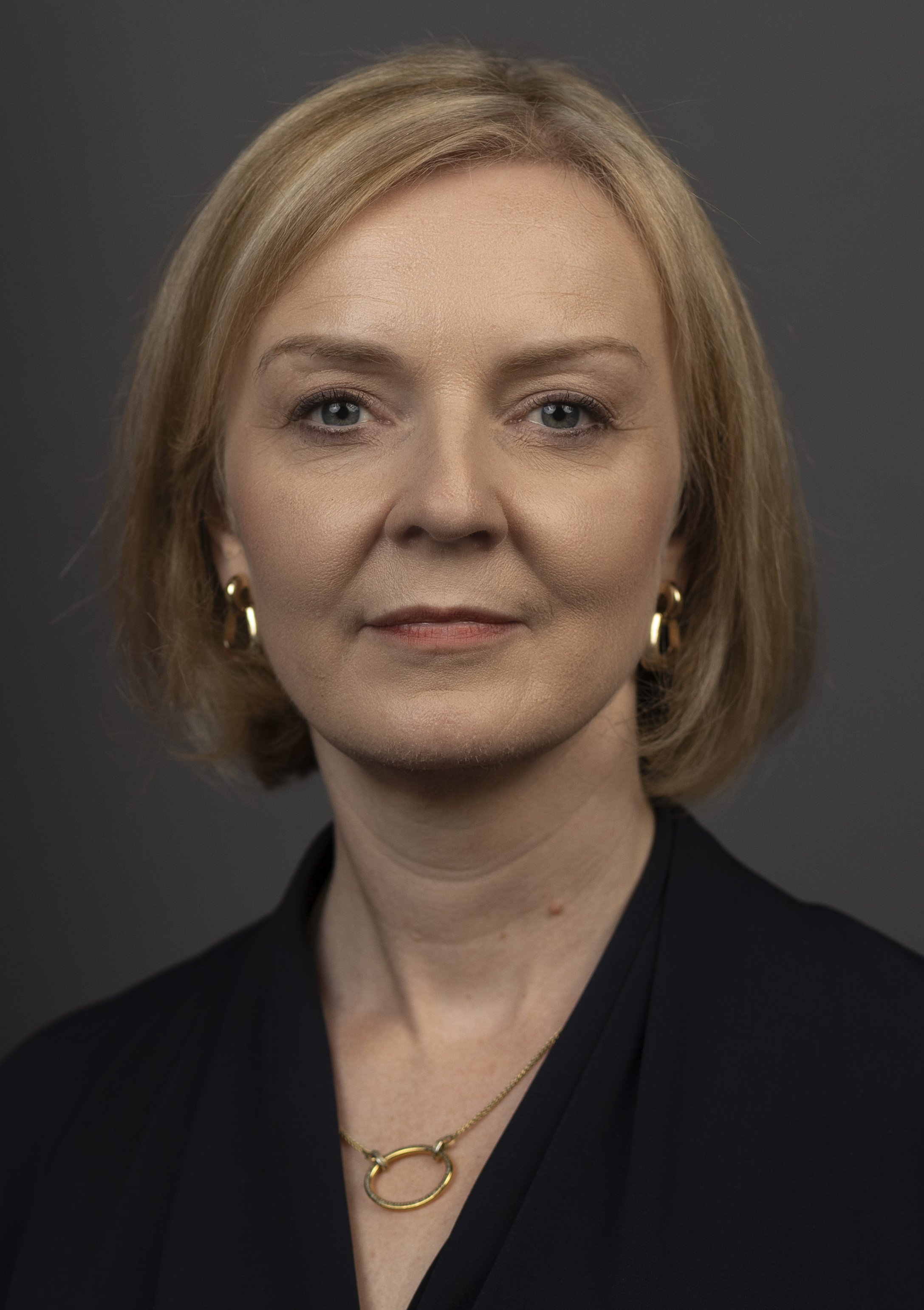
Margaret Thatcher, Theresa May, Liz Truss are the three woman who have served as Prime Minister of the United Kingdom

In the United Kingdom, 34% of the lower house, the House of Commons, and 28% of the upper house, the House of Lords, are women as of March 2021, which ranks 38th in the world for the proportion of women in the lower (or only) house of parliament. The government of the United Kingdom at that date included five women Cabinet ministers (23%). The highest proportion of women in Cabinet was 36% between 2006 and 2007. The UK has had three female prime ministers, Margaret Thatcher (1979–1990), Theresa May (2016–2019) and Liz Truss (2022). In 1992 Betty Boothroyd became the first female elected Speaker of the House of Commons and held that post until 2000.

The head of state of the United Kingdom from 1952 until 2022 was Queen Elizabeth II. She remains the longest-serving female head of state in world history. The Succession to the Crown Act 2013 repealed the Royal Marriages Act 1772, replacing male-preference primogeniture with absolute primogeniture for those born in the line of succession after 28 October 2011, which meant the eldest child, regardless of sex, would precede his or her brothers and sisters.

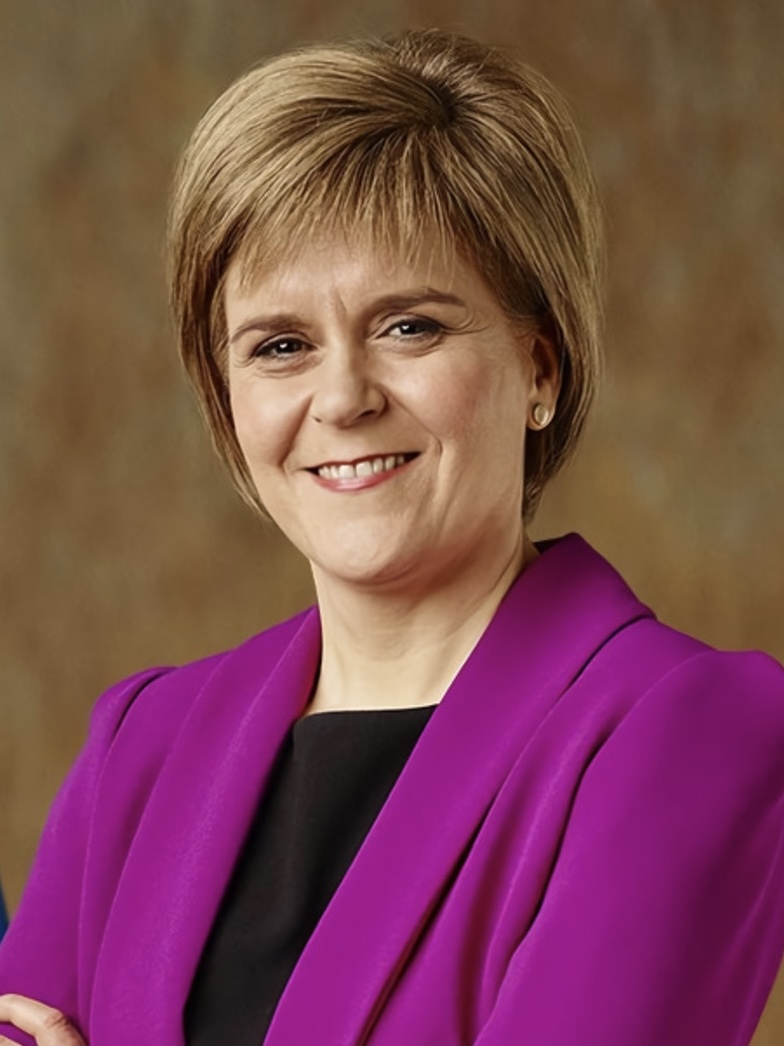
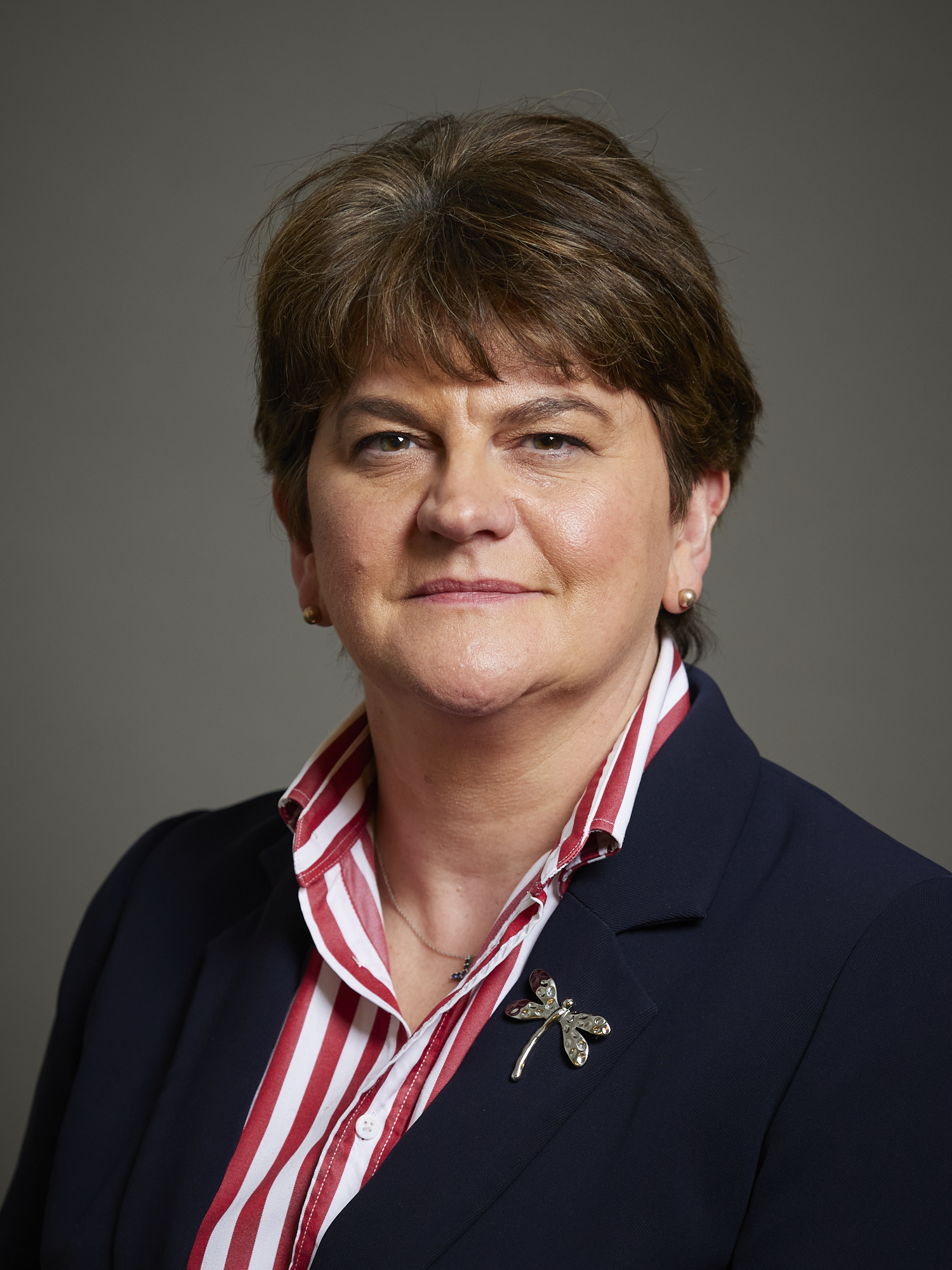
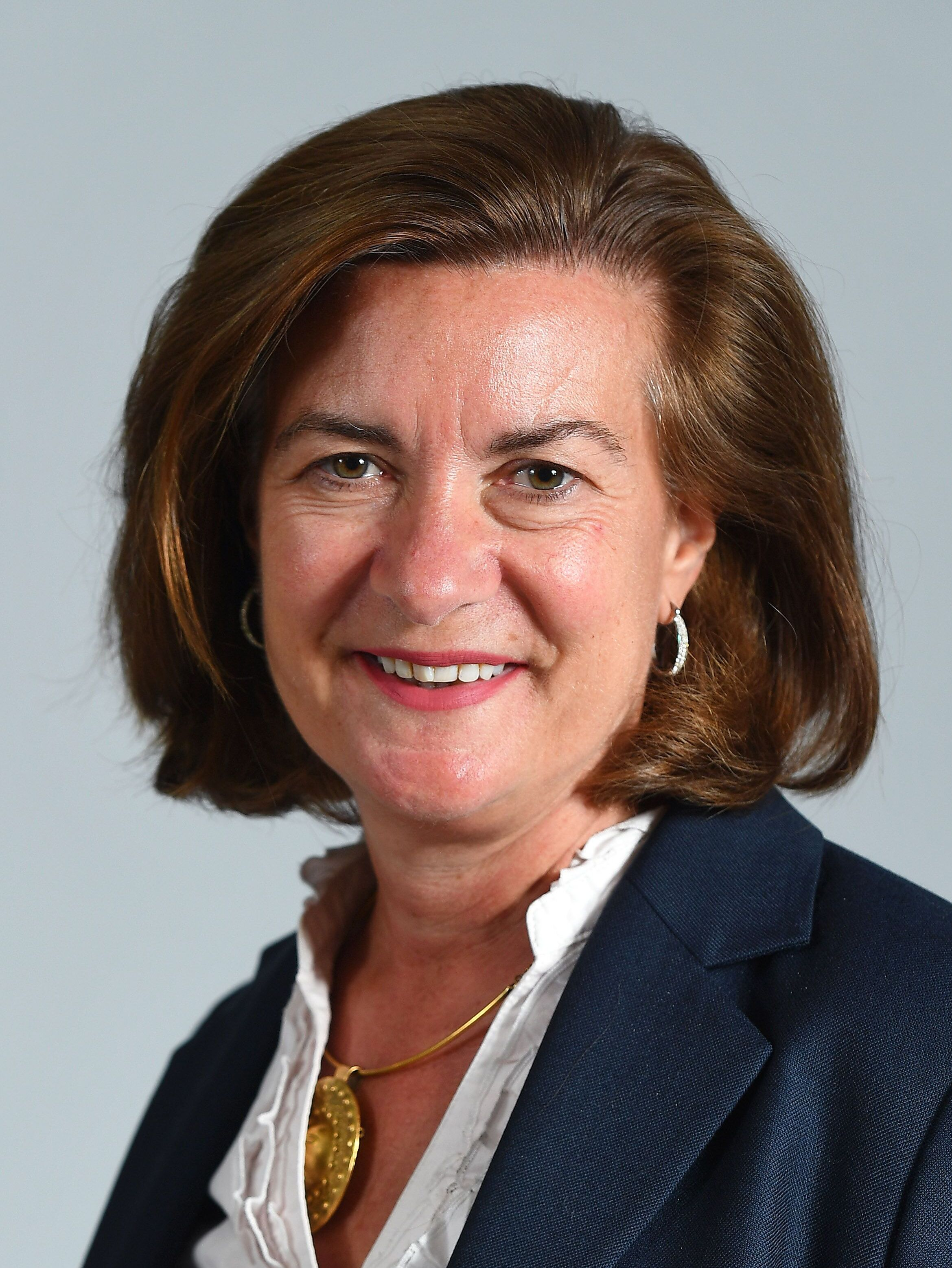
Nicola Sturgeon, Arlene Foster, Eluned Morgan were the first women First Ministers of Scotland, Wales and Northern Ireland

Nicola Sturgeon served as First Minister of Scotland from 2014 until 2023. Arlene Foster served twice as First Minister of Northern Ireland (2016–2017 and 2020–2021). Eluned Morgan served as First Minister of Wales from 2024 until 2026. In the devolved legislatures of Scotland, Wales and Northern Ireland, the proportion of women members is 47% in Wales and 36% in Scotland and Northern Ireland. In local councils the proportion of women councillors is 36% in England, 29% in Scotland, 28% in Wales and 26% in Northern Ireland. 40% of members of the London Assembly are women.

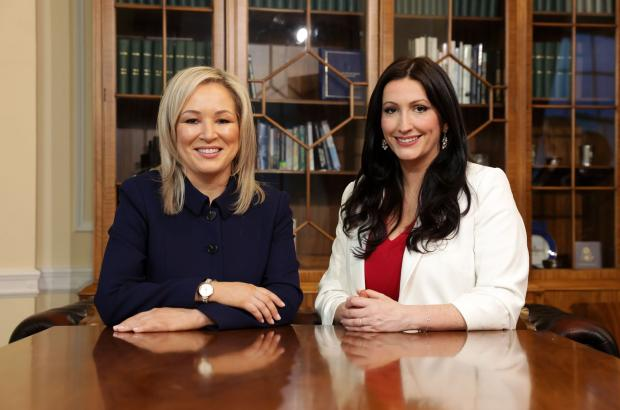
Michelle O'Neill as First Minister of Northern Ireland with Deputy First Minister Emma Little-Pengelly

In the 2024 Northern Ireland Executive formation; Michelle O'Neill of Sinn Féin became First Minister with Emma Little-Pengelly of the DUP as Deputy First Minister.

=== North America ===
==== Canada ====
Danielle Smith, Premier of Alberta

The number of women in the Canadian Parliament has been slowly but steadily increasing since the 1980s and has reached its highest point following the 2021 Canadian federal election where women made up 30.5% of the Canadian House of Commons, higher than the global average of 25.7% and surpassing the 1995 United Nations goal of 30% female representation in government.

==== United States ====
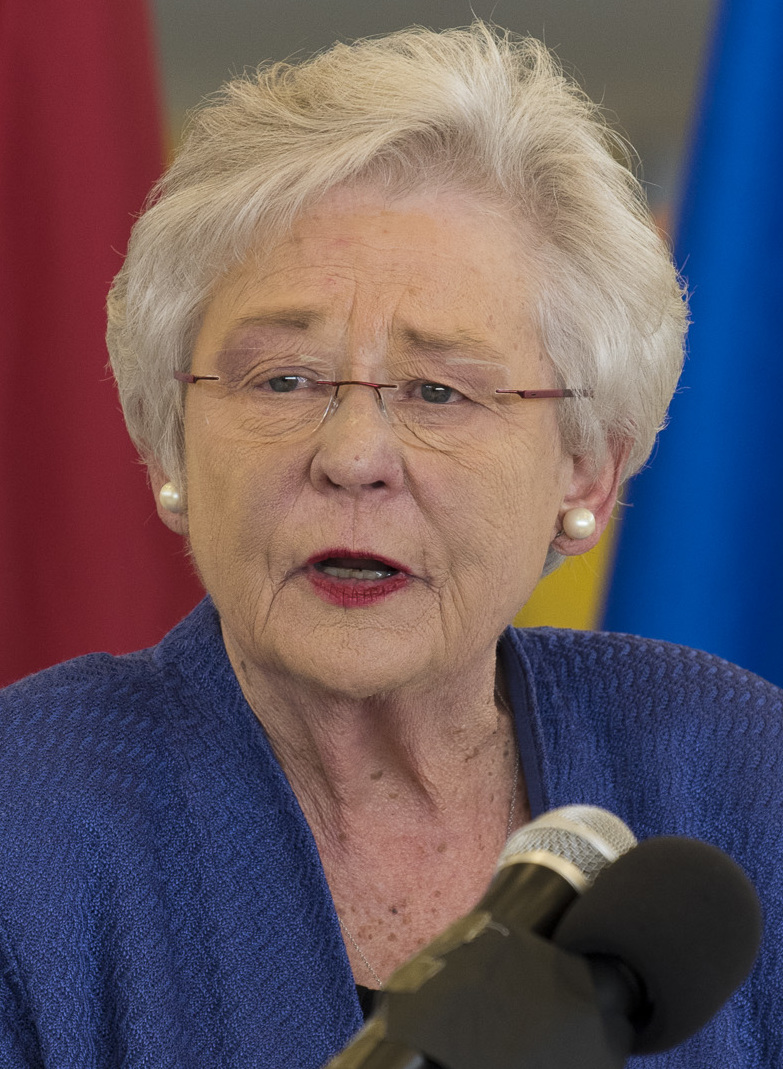
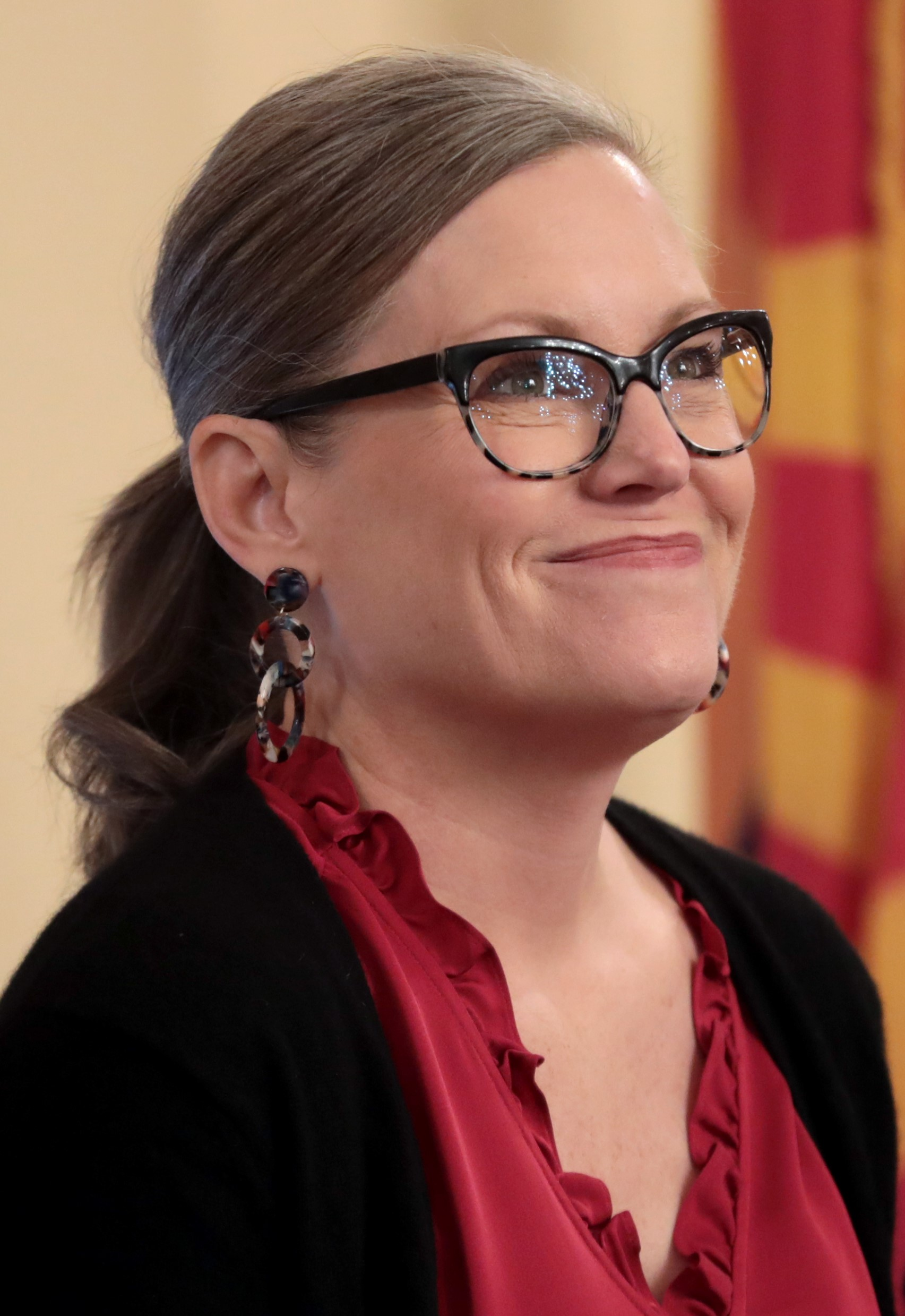
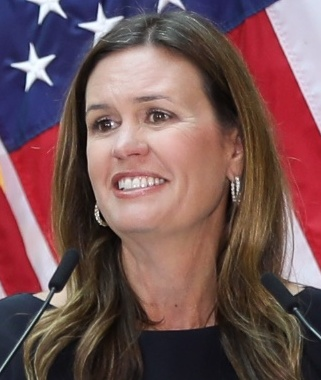
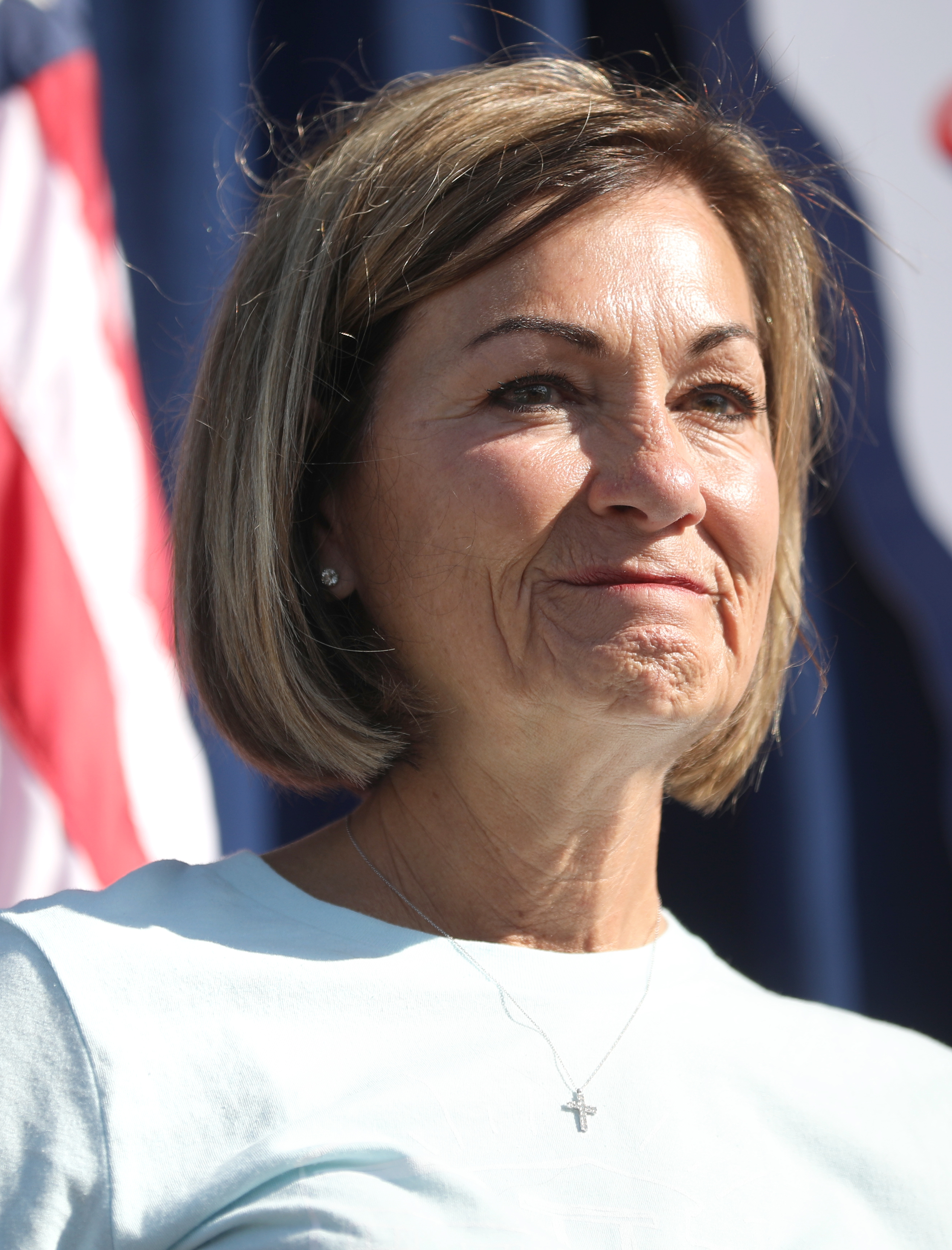
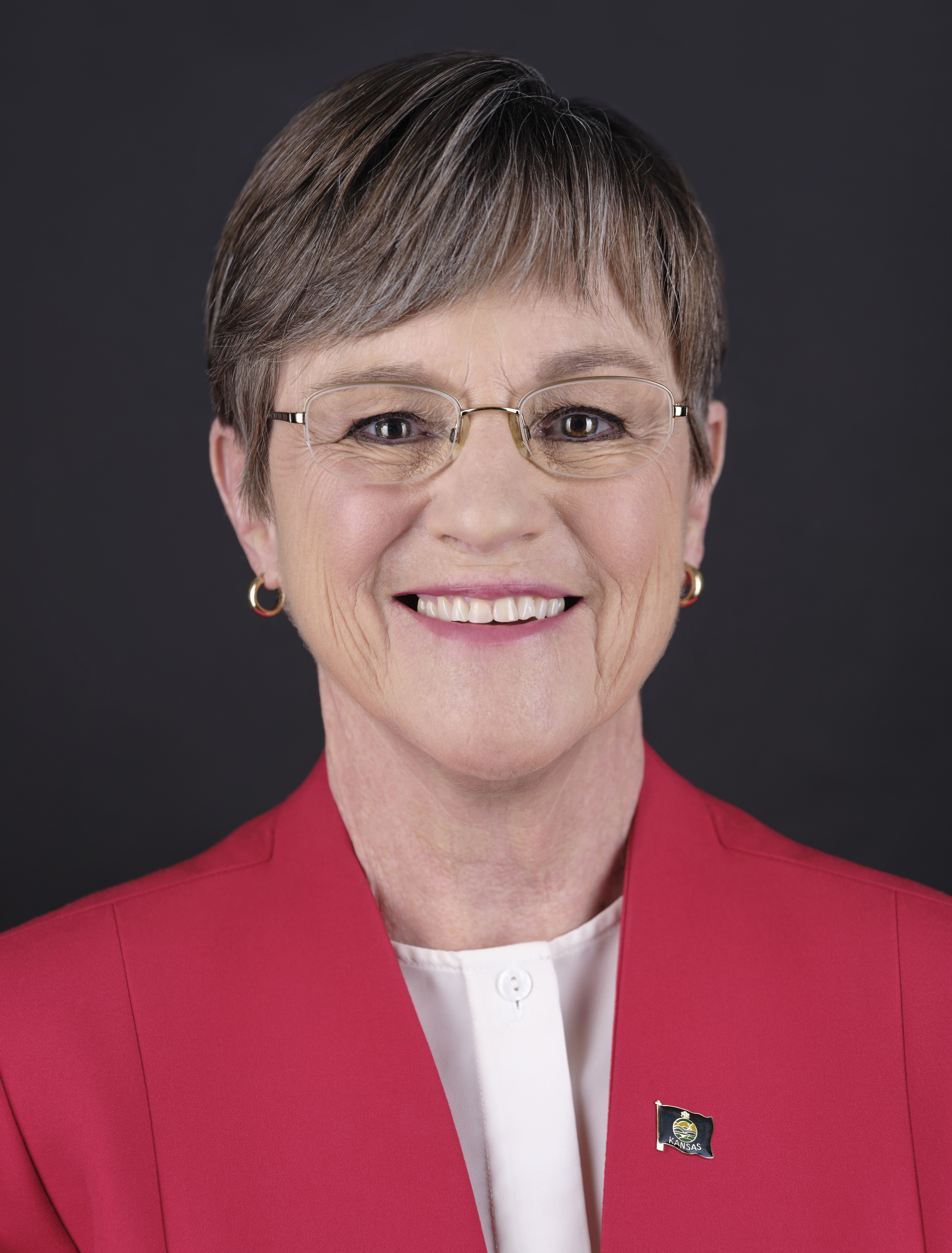
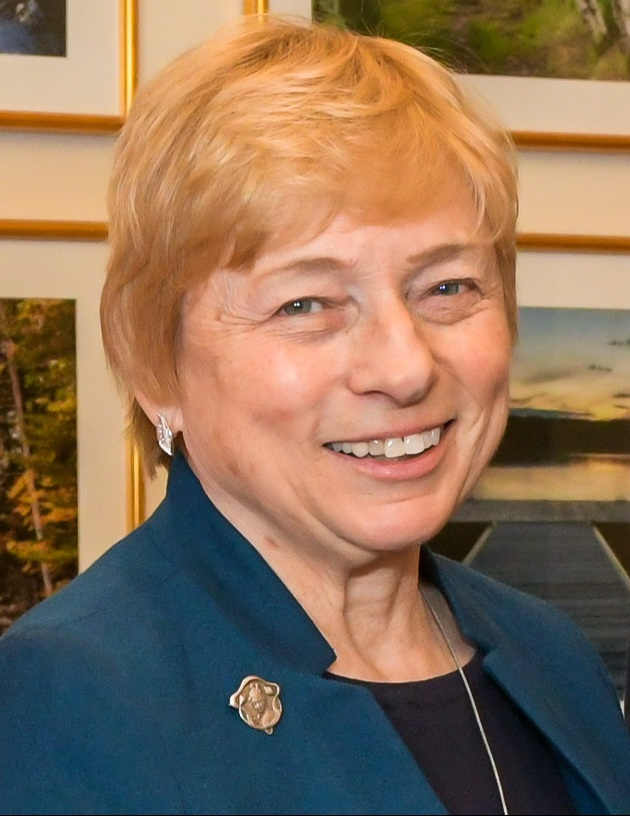
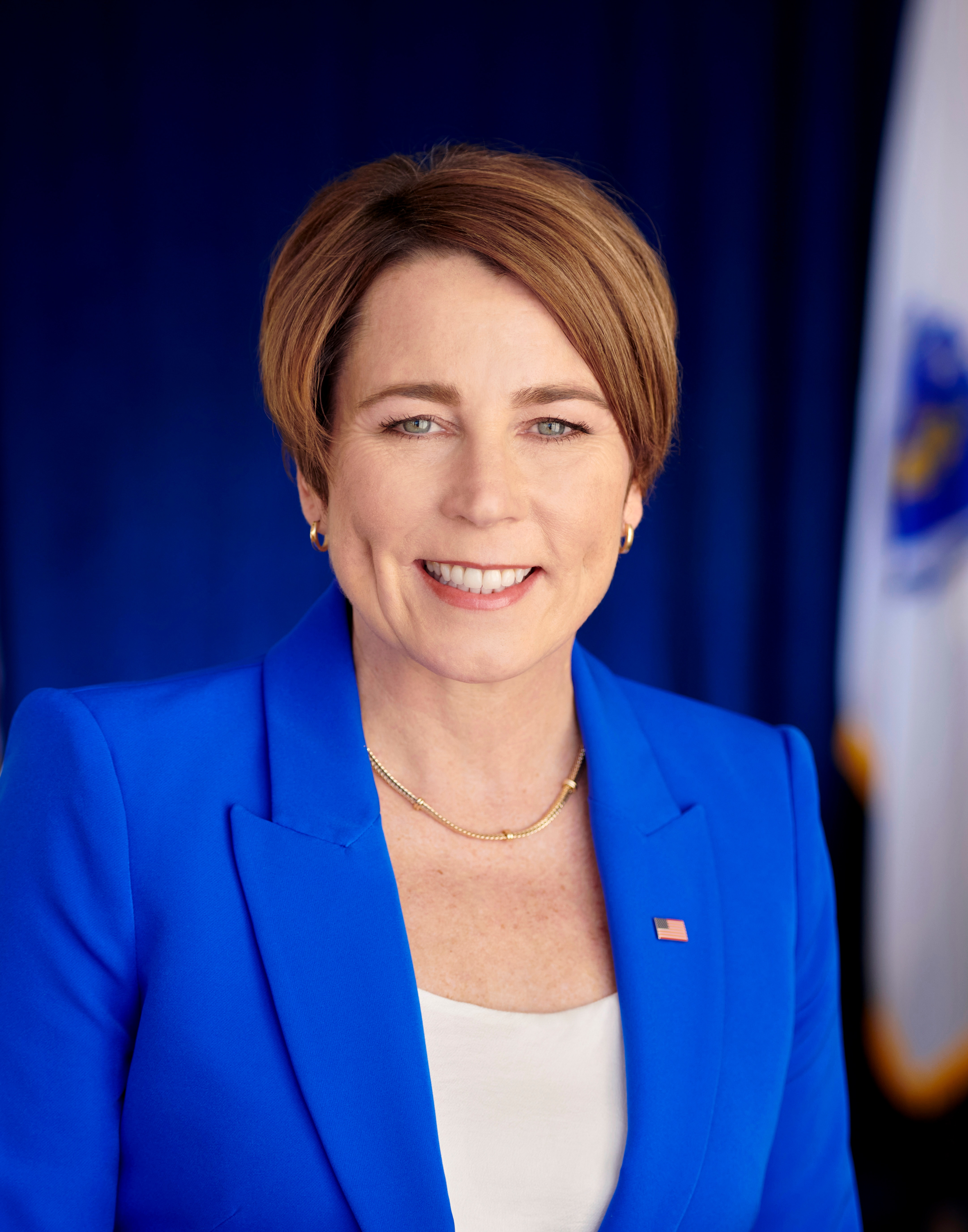
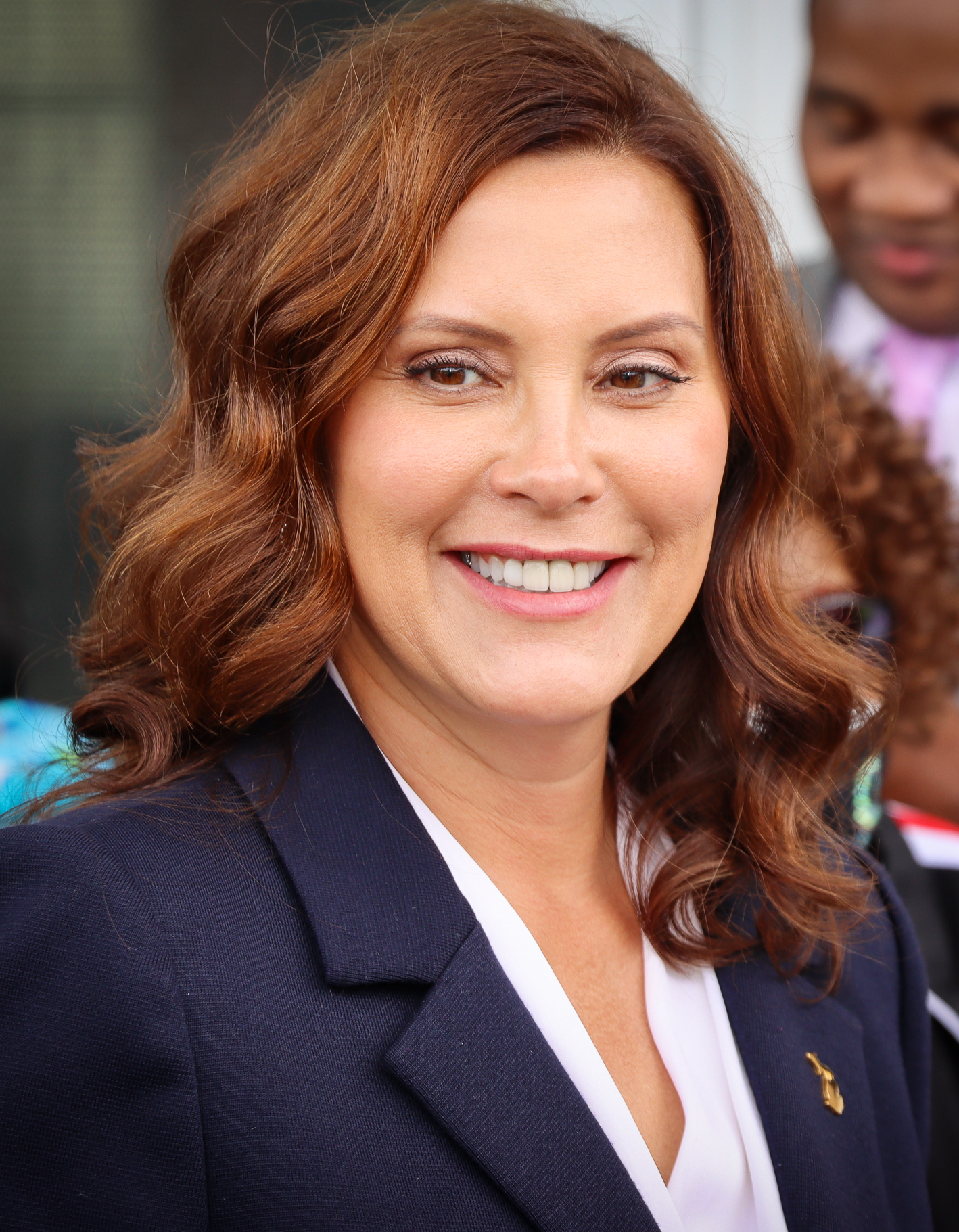
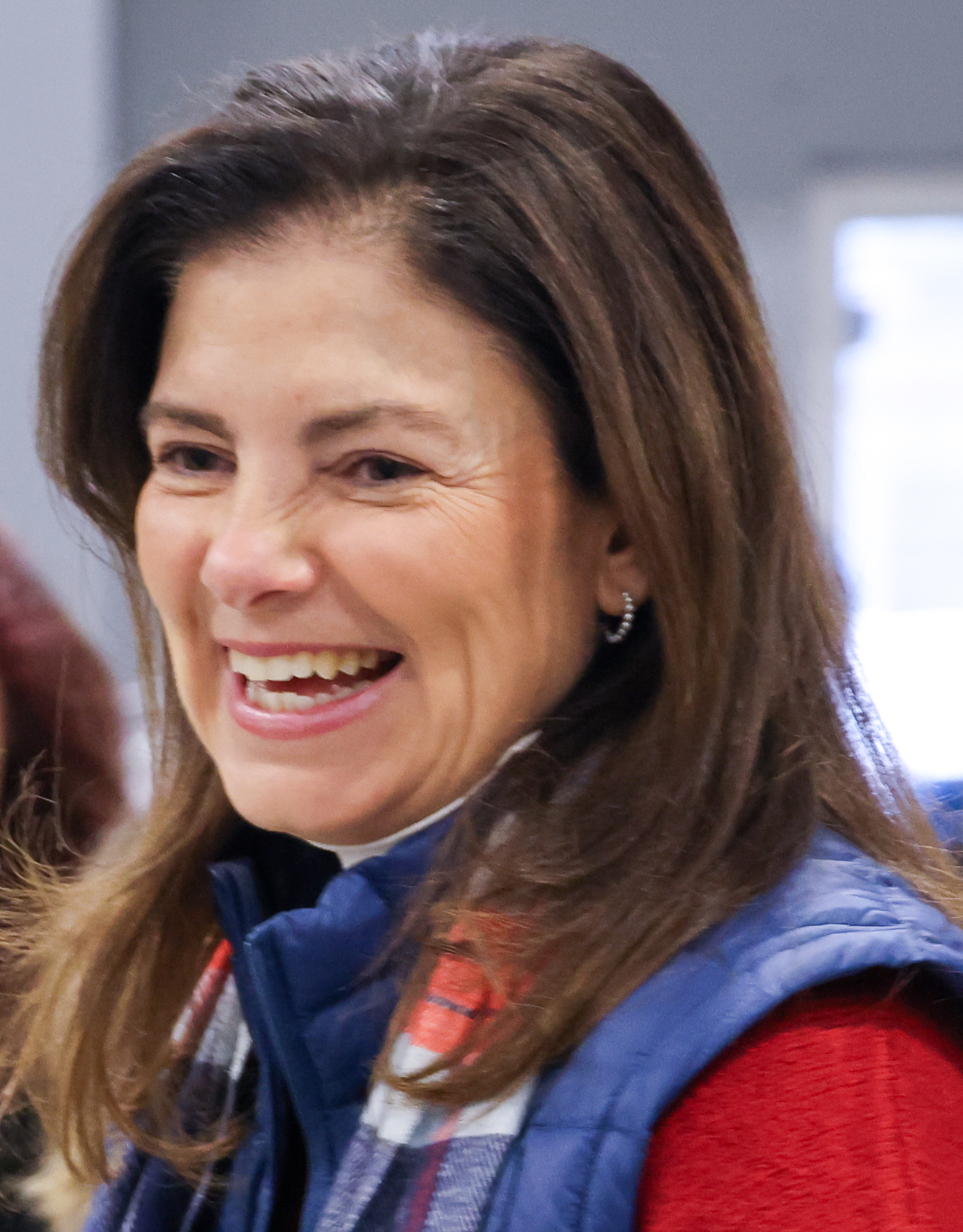
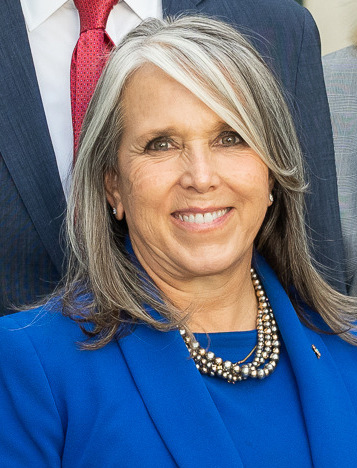
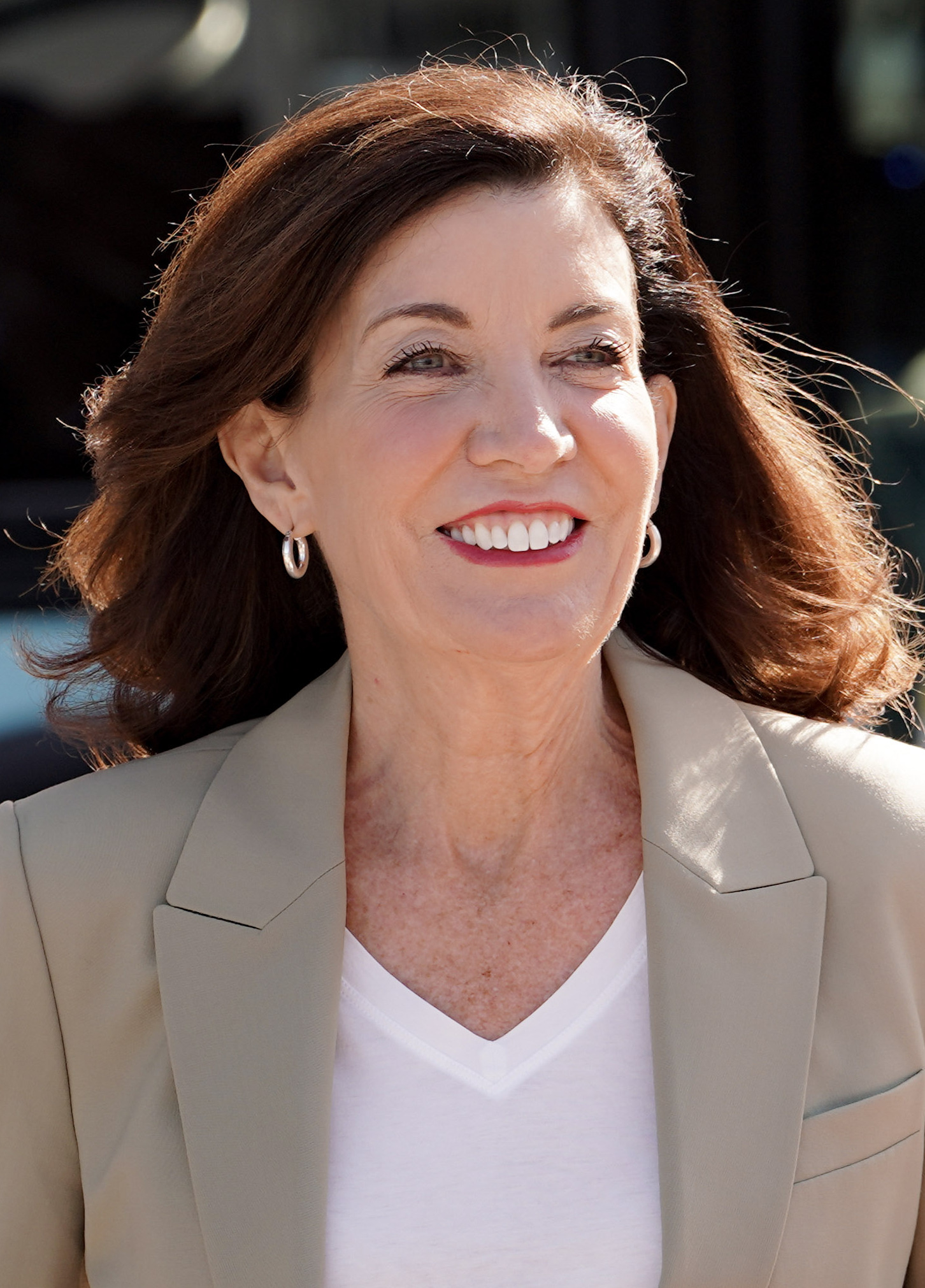
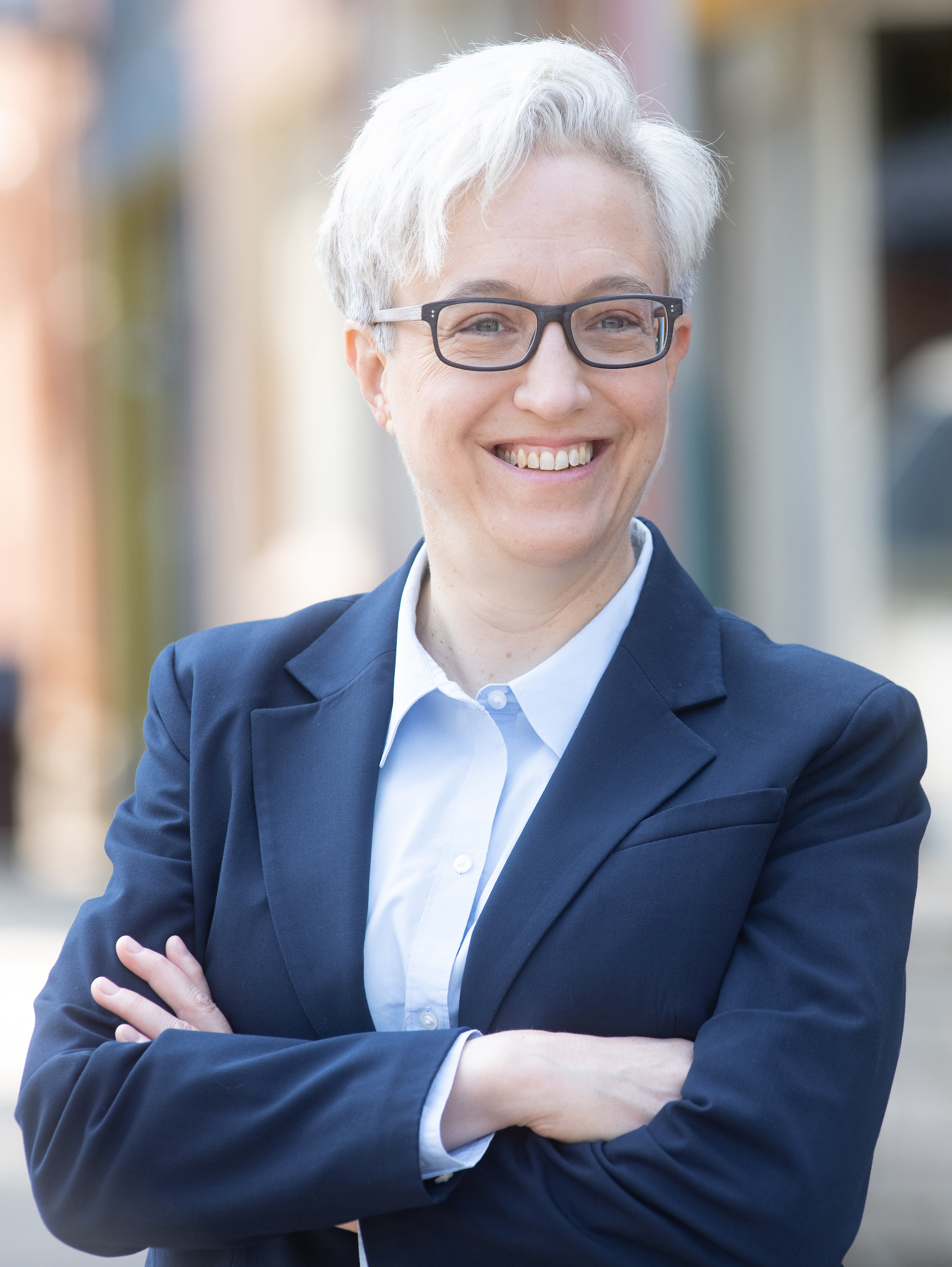
Female state governors in the United States:
- Kay Ivey, Governor of Alabama
- Katie Hobbs, Governor of Arizona
- Sarah Huckabee Sanders, Governor of Arkansas
- Kim Reynolds, Governor of Iowa
- Laura Kelly, Governor of Kansas
- Janet Mills, Governor of Maine
- Maura Healey, Governor of Massachusetts
- Gretchen Whitmer, Governor of Michigan
- Kelly Ayotte, Governor of New Hampshire
- Michelle Lujan Grisham, Governor of New Mexico
- Kathy Hochul, Governor of New York
- Tina Kotek, Governor of Oregon

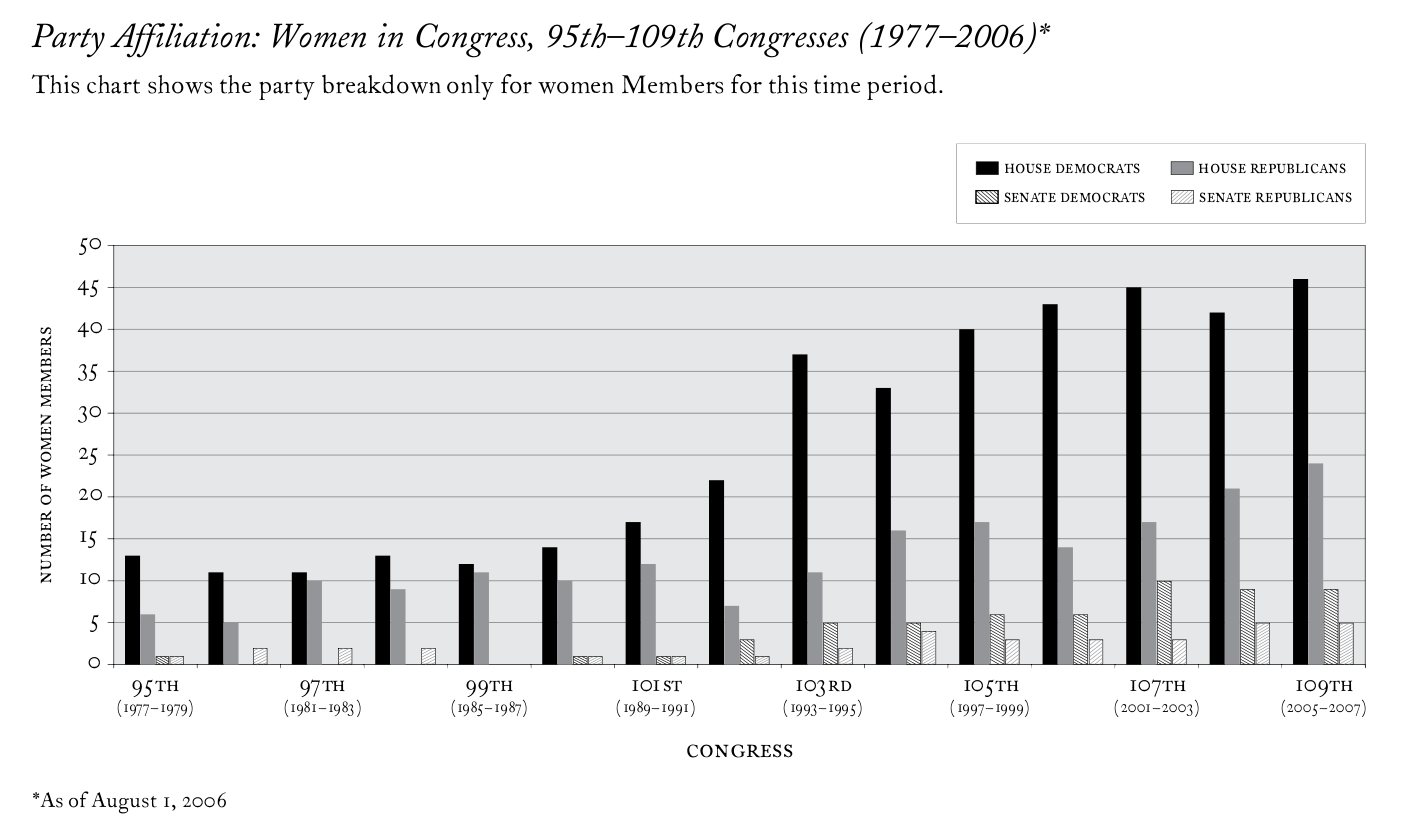
The number of women in the U.S. Congress (both the House and Senate) from 1977 to 2006

Women secured officeholding rights in the United States in a piecemeal fashion. Some women were even able to achieve positions in offices like mayor, notary public, state librarian, and others before the passage of the Nineteenth Amendment, which gave women the right to vote.

As of 2018, although the number of women in government in the US had grown, women still held less than 25% of government positions nationwide. In Congress, both in the Senate and the House of Representatives, women historically and currently are under represented. No political gender quotas exist, mandatory or voluntary.

From 1917, when Representative Jeannette Rankin of Montana became the first woman to serve in Congress, to the 115th congress, a total of 329 women have served as U.S. representatives, delegates, or senators. Between 1917 and 2018, the United States has had 277 women serve in the House of Representatives. From 1922—when Rebecca Latimer Felton became the first woman to serve in the Senate—to the present, 58 women have served in the United States Senate.

In the 115th Congress, 107 (78D, 29R) women hold seats in the United States Congress, comprising 20.0% of the 535 members; 23 women (23%) serve in the U.S. Senate, and 84 women (19.3%) serve in the U.S. House of Representatives.

The United States is one of the shrinking number of industrialized democracies that has not yet had a woman as its leader. Although the United States claims to espouse the rights of women and girls around the world, it has only elected male presidents.

Women have served as mayors in the United States since the late nineteenth century and as state governors since 1925. In 2008, the New Hampshire State Senate became the first state legislature upper house to possess an elected female majority. In 2019, the Nevada Legislature became the first state to have a state legislature composed of a female majority.

In popular media in the United States, female politicians see some focus on their appearance; more so than their male counterparts. A 2011 feminist journal by Carlin and Winfrey focuses on the portrayal of female politicians in the media. According to the journal, the way media perceives women and men is very distinct in the language they chose to use. The language chosen to talk or describe other people can either hurt or help them in a political campaign. As a result of women being talked about in sexist terms in can greatly affect her reputation and credibility. The journal claims the media uses terms that indicative of women not being valued as individuals. "This is especially true when women are described using metaphors that draw on animals, children, or food. Animal terms focus on the appearance and sexuality of young women (foxy), and as women grow older, or are seen as too aggressive, they may be called barracuda, old bat, shrew, or cow." Females tend to have less issue coverage than males (due to fewer female politicians), but tend to have more coverage on things such as their appearance than male politicians. Male candidates don't get coverage on what kind of suit they are wearing or who designed it. This is due to innate purpose of the media to appeal to demands of their audiences for sales – in this case, the popular female focus on fashion that dominates the media. Studies done on women candidates have shown that women receive more attention in the media for factors such as appearance, clothes, size, and emotional state". In 2015 Rachel Silbermann conducted a study that time spent traveling to and from work is particularly burdensome for those who spend time caring for children, and as women do a majority of the child care and housework, commuting is particularly burdensome to them. Silbermann also found that female students weigh proximity to home twice as heavily as male students do in a hypothetical decision of whether to run for higher office. She suggests that to achieve equal representation of women in government men and women will need to share household responsibilities more equally.

A 2016 study found no evidence that the low share of women in the U.S. House of Representative was due to gender discrimination by voters. According to the author of the study, "these results suggest that the deficit of female representation in the House is more likely the result of barriers to entering politics as opposed to overt gender discrimination by voters and campaign donors."

A 2017 study found that over the prior decade, public opposition to electing a woman as president declined from approximately 26% to 13%.

A 2018 study in the American Political Science Review did not find evidence that American voters were outright hostile to women in politics or that they held double standards. The study did however find that American voters preferred candidates who were married and had children. Since the burdens of child-rearing disproportionately fall on women in households, the bias in favor of married candidates with children may explain women's underrepresentation in politics.

Nevertheless, the year 2018 saw the largest increase in female representation in state governments following a decade of stagnation: 1,834 women won office at the state and federal level during the mid-term elections, 2,112 women got seats in state legislative offices, and six women have launched campaigns for the highest office in the land.

In 2021, a quarter of all members in Congress were women, the highest percentage in US history. 27% of the House of Representatives are women, while women hold 24 out of 100 seats in the Senate.

According to a survey administered to 1,039 U.S. citizens, the number of women who hold a position in government office could be due to a baseline preference of one sex over another. The results show that 60% of respondents have a baseline gender preference for a male candidate, while 40% prefer a female candidate.

Other notable female politicians in the United States include former U.S. senator and incumbent vice president Kamala Harris; U.S. representative and former speaker of the House Nancy Pelosi; U.S. senator and President Pro Tempore Patty Murray; former first lady, U.S. senator, Secretary of State, and Democratic presidential nominee Hillary Clinton; Democratic vice presidential nominee and U.S. representative Geraldine Ferraro; Republican vice presidential nominee and Alaska governor Sarah Palin; former New Hampshire governor and U.S. senator Jeanne Shaheen; former Michigan governor and secretary of energy Jennifer Granholm; former Kansas governor and secretary of health and human services Kathleen Sebelius; former South Carolina governor and U.S. ambassador to the United Nations Nikki Haley; former Wyoming governor and director of the U.S. Mint Nellie Ross; former Texas governor Miriam A. Ferguson; Alabama governor, former Alabama lieutenant governor, and Alabama treasurer Kay Ivey; U.S. representatives and U.S. senators Margaret Chase Smith, Barbara Mikulski, Olympia Snowe, Barbara Boxer, Debbie Stabenow, and Tammy Baldwin; U.S. senators Nancy Kassebaum, Dianne Feinstein, Carol Moseley Braun, Kay Bailey Hutchison, Susan Collins, Lisa Murkowski, and Elizabeth Warren; U.S. representatives Edith Rogers, Patsy Mink, Shirley Chisolm, Bella Abzug, Barbara Jordan, Marcy Kaptur, Ileana Ros-Lehtinen, Alexandria Ocasio-Cortez and Marjorie Taylor Greene; and Supreme Court justices Sandra Day O'Connor, Ruth Bader Ginsburg, Sonia Sotomayor, Elena Kagan, Amy Coney Barrett, and Ketanji Brown Jackson.

=== Oceania ===
==== Australia ====
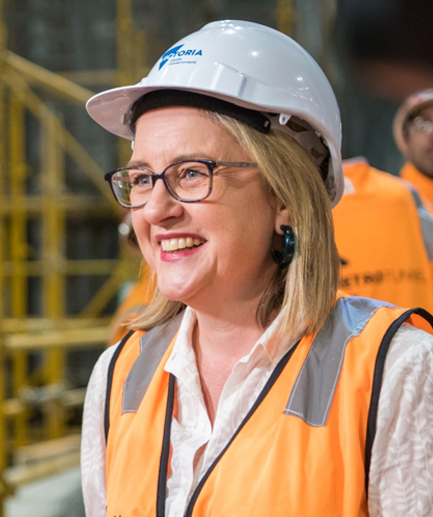
Jacinta Allan, Premier of Victoria

In 1902, Australia became the first country to give some women the vote and allow them to stand for Parliament. This did not apply to Aboriginal Australians, including women, until the amendment of the Electoral Act in 1962. It wasn't until 1983 that Indigenous people had voting rights entirely equal to white Australians when another amendment made enrollment to vote compulsory, rather than voluntary. 19 years after the Commonwealth Franchise Act was passed, Edith Cowan was elected to the Western Australian Legislative Assembly and became the first woman ever elected to any Australian Parliament. Dorothy Tangney was the first woman elected to the Australian Senate in 1946, a seat she held for twenty-five years. In the same year, Dame Enid Lyons became the first woman elected to the House of Representatives. In 1986, Joan Child becomes the first female elected to Speaker of the House of Representatives and held the position for over three years. Of the two major political parties in Australia, the Australian Labor Party (ALP) introduced a 35% quota in 1994 and increased this to 40% in 2002 whereas, as of 2018, the Liberal National Party (LNP) had no gender-based quotas.

On 1 January 2017, Australia was ranked 52 out of 175 countries in terms of women in ministerial positions and 50th out of 190 countries in terms of women in the lower house of Parliament. The report issued by UN Women found 24.1% of, or 7 out of the 29 Australian ministers were women. Following the 2025 Australian election, the 48th Parliament of Australia is its closest to parity yet, at 49.6%. The governing ALP exceeds their 40% quota and is made up of 56.1% women, with 46.1% in Cabinet, and the LNP in Opposition with 33%.

2007 was a notable year for women in Australian Parliament. Anna Bligh became Queensland's first female premier, a position she occupied for five years, and Julia Gillard MP became deputy prime minister. Three years later, Gillard was elected as Australia's first female prime minister. Dame Quentin Bryce became the first and only woman appointed governor-general, a position that is representative of the monarch, in 2008 and served until 2014. Christine Milne is the only woman to have been head of a major political party when she was elected leader of the Australian Greens in 2012.

Indigenous people, women in particular, are grossly under-represented in Australian Parliament. Since Federation in 1901, there have been 40 Indigenous Australians involved in any Parliament (sixteen women) and eight in the Federal Parliament (four women). Following are some notable figures:

- Carol Martin of Western Australia was the first Indigenous woman elected to any Australian Parliament in 2001 and was subsequently re-elected in 2005 and 2008.
- Marion Scrymgour of the Northern Territory became the first Aboriginal woman minister in any Australian government in 2002 and became the highest-ranked Indigenous woman in government with her service as Deputy Chief Minister of the Northern Territory from 2007 to 2009.
- Linda Burney, New South Wales, becomes the first Aboriginal person elected to the New South Wales State Parliament in 2003 and the first Aboriginal woman elected to the House of Representatives in 2016.
- Joanna Lindgren occupied a Senate seat for little over a year from 2015.
- Malarndirri McCarthy was elected to the Northern Territory's legislature in 2005 and gained a Senate seat in 2016.
- The first Aboriginal woman to be elected to Federal Parliament was Nova Peris in 2013 after being selected as a Northern Territory Senate candidate.

==== New Zealand ====
In 1893, New Zealand became the first self-governing country in the world to allow women to vote. This included both European and Māori women. Elizabeth Yates became the first female mayor in the British Empire in 1893. However, it was not until 1919 that women were allowed to run for Parliament, and Elizabeth McCombs became the first women elected to the Parliament in 1933.

In the early twentieth century, party leaders—all of them men—were reluctant to allow women rights beyond basic suffrage, but wartime sped up change. By 1972, the Second Wave of Feminism and the changing attitudes of some party leaders resulted in women gaining more opportunities to become MPs and by 2001 an unprecedented number of women held leadership positions in the New Zealand Parliament.

In recent times New Zealand has had many women in top leadership and government roles, including three prime ministers; Jenny Shipley (1997–1999), Helen Clark (1999–2008) and Jacinda Ardern (2017–2023). New Zealand has a gender pay gap of 9.5%.

=== South America ===
==== Brazil ====
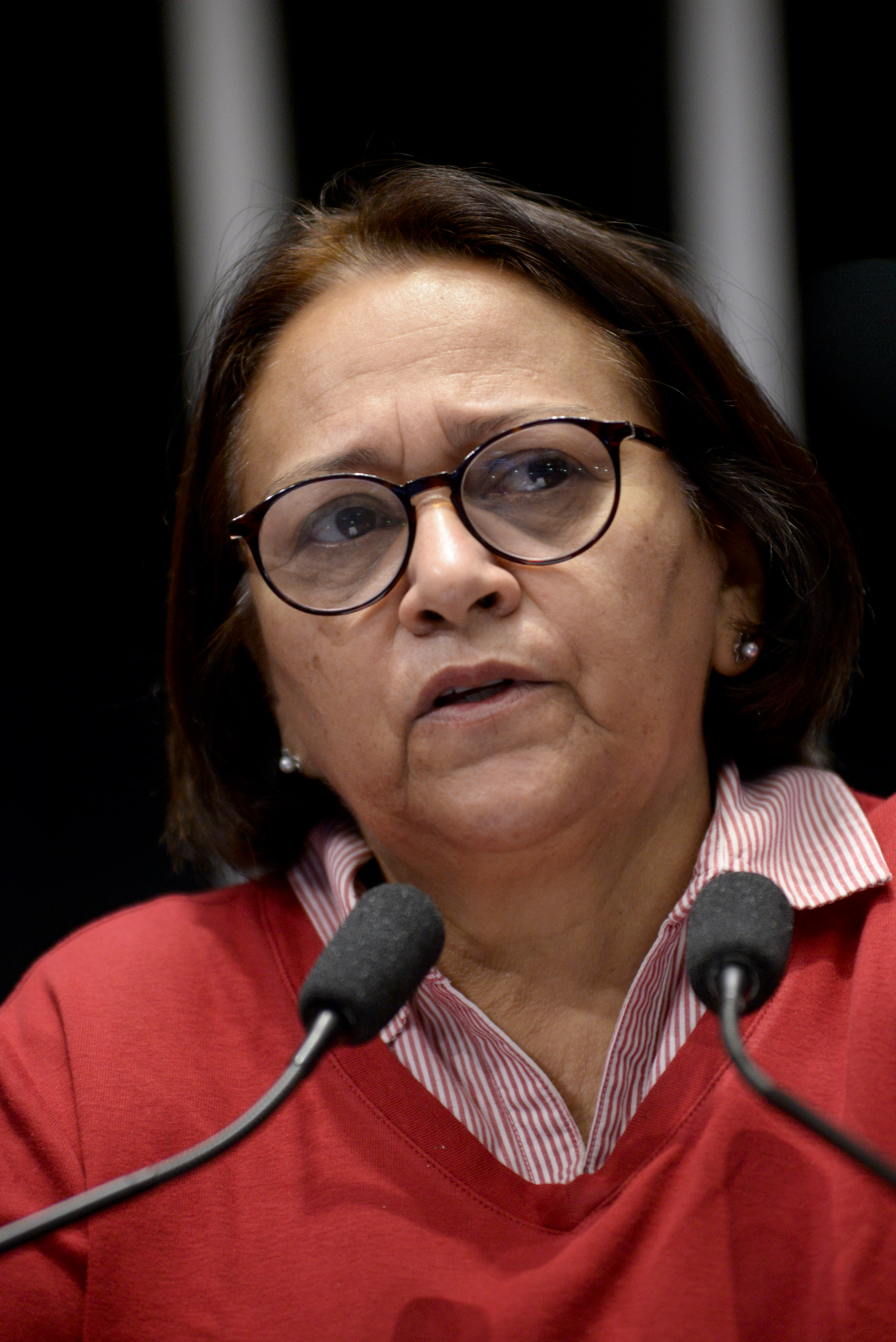
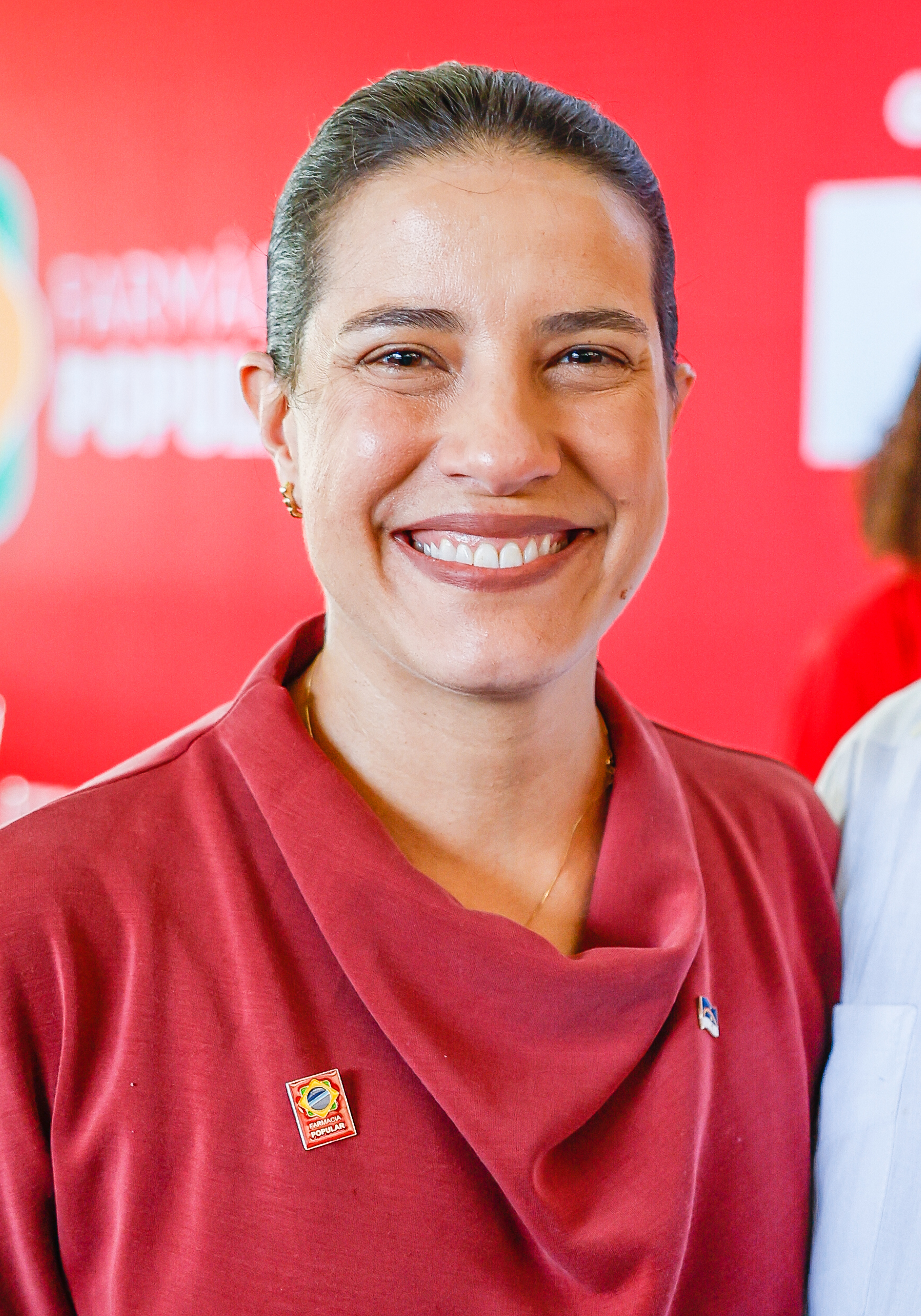
Female governors in Brazil:
- Fátima Bezerra, Governor of Rio Grande do Norte
- Raquel Lyra, Governor of Pernambuco

Bertha Lutz was the founding mother of the Brazilian woman suffrage movement. In 1919 she founded the League for Intellectual Emancipation of Women. Lutz also created the Brazilian Federation for Women's Progress (1922), a political group which advocated for Brazilian women's rights, most importantly, their right to vote. She later played a central role as a member of the small group of feminists at the 1945 founding of the United Nations.

A 1995 Brazilian gender quota was extended first to city councilor positions in 1996, then extended to candidates of all political legislative positions by 1998. By 1998, 30% of political candidates had to be women, with varied results in terms of the gender balance of the officials ultimately elected. Though the percentage of national legislature seats occupied by women dropped in the initial years following the passage of the quota law, the percentage has since risen (from 6.2% pre-quota, to 5.7% in 1998, to 8.9% in 2006). However, Brazil has struggled with the quota law in several respects:

- Though the quota law mandates a certain percentage of candidate spots be reserved for women, it is not compulsory that those spots be filled by women.
- The quota law also allowed political parties to increase the number of candidates, further increasing electoral competition and having a negligible impact on the actual number of women elected.

In Brazil, the Secretariat of Policies for Women, was until recently the main Brazilian state-feminism agency at the federal level. Under Workers' Party governments (2003–2016), Brazil carried out women-focused policies in three dimensions of its foreign policy: diplomacy, development cooperation, and security.

== Women's suffrage ==
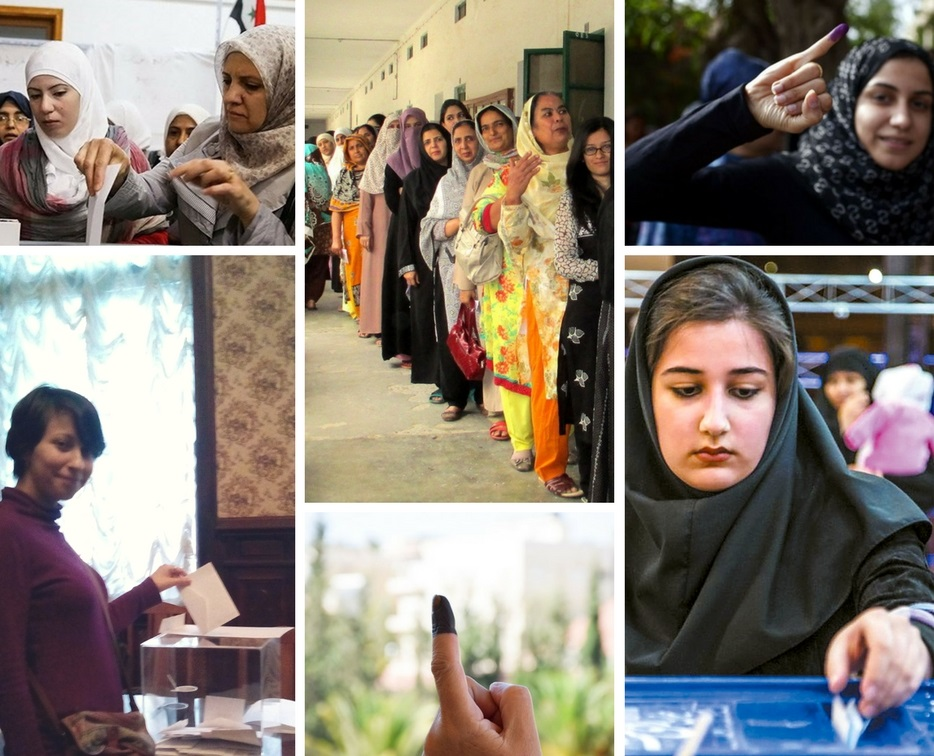
A collage of Muslim women voters in the 2010s from different countries such as Algeria, Syria, Pakistan, Jordan, Egypt and Iran

In some languages, and occasionally in English, the right to vote is called active suffrage, as distinct from passive suffrage, which is the right to stand for election. The combination of active and passive suffrage is sometimes called full suffrage.

The rules for selecting government ministers vary by type of government system and by country.

== See also ==
- Council of Women World Leaders
- Critical mass (gender politics)
- European countries by percentage of women in national parliaments
- List of the first female members of parliament by country
- Matriarchy
- Muslim women political leaders
- Women in positions of power
- Women Political Leaders
