= Fighter pilot =

Military combat aviator

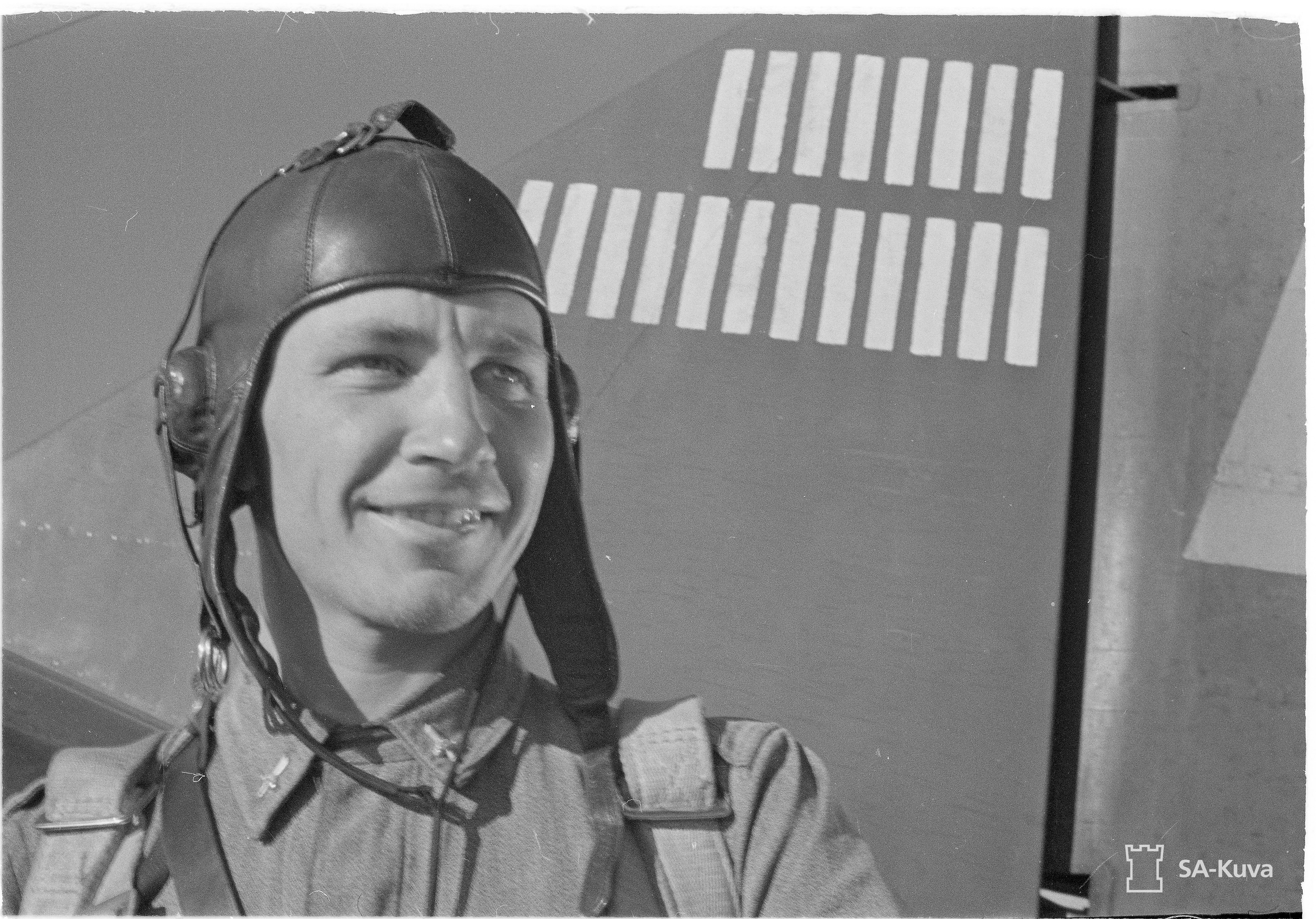
Ilmari Juutilainen, a Finnish WWII fighter pilot with Brewster BW-364 "Orange 4" on 26 June 1942 during the Continuation War.

A fighter pilot or combat pilot is a military aviator trained to engage in air-to-air combat, air-to-ground combat and sometimes electronic warfare while in the cockpit of a fighter aircraft. Fighter pilots undergo specialized training in aerial warfare and dogfighting (close range aerial combat). A fighter pilot with at least five air-to-air kills becomes known as an ace.

== Recruitment ==
Fighter pilots are one of the most important positions of any air force. Selection processes only accept the elite out of all the potential candidates. An individual who possesses an exceptional academic record, physical fitness, healthy well-being, and a strong mental drive will have a higher chance of being selected for pilot training. Candidates are also expected to exhibit strong leadership and teamwork abilities. In nearly all air forces, fighter pilots are commissioned officers. This is the same for pilots of most other aircraft.

== Fitness ==
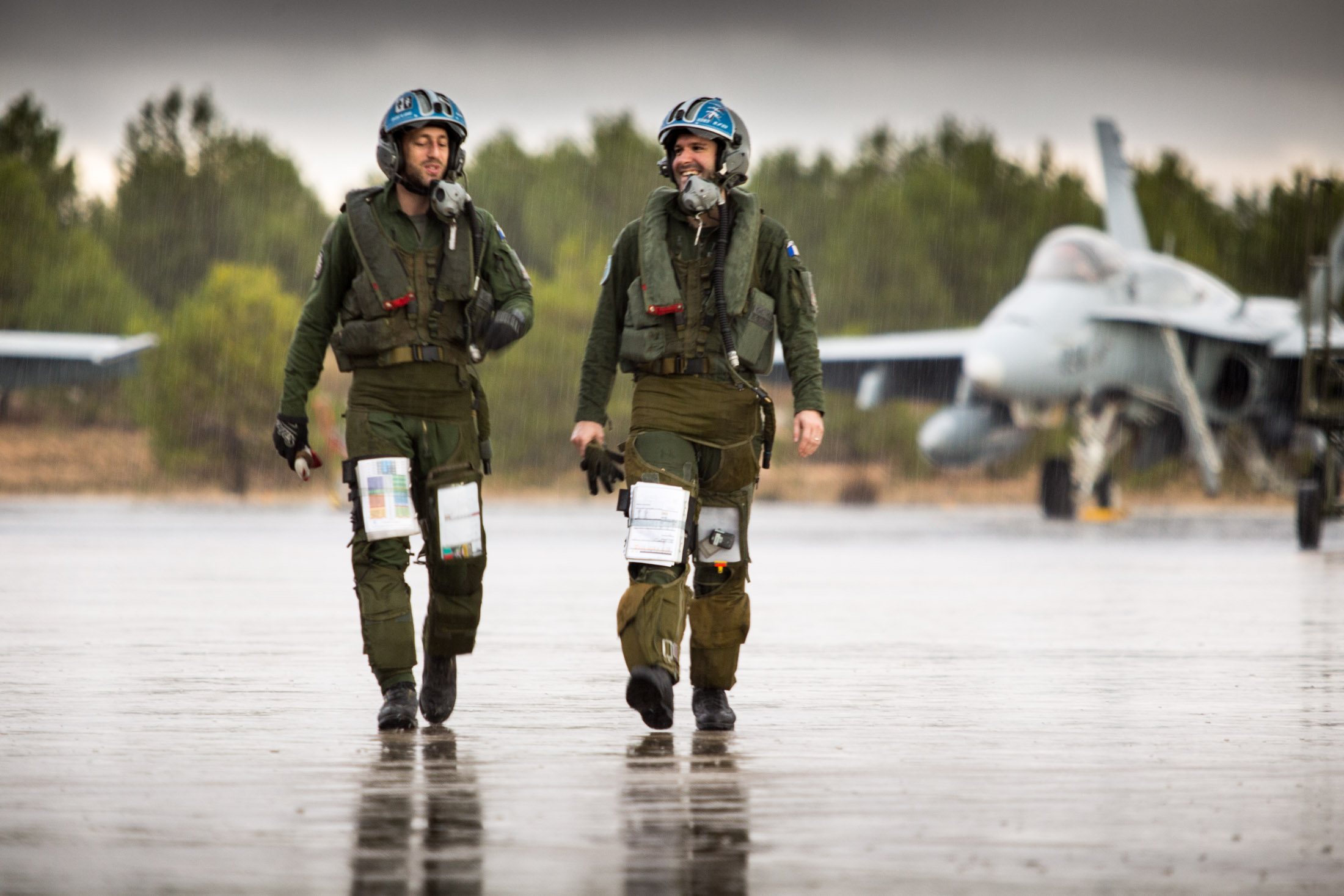
French Air Force fighter pilots leaving the tarmac after landing (2015)

Fighter pilots must be in optimal health to handle the physical demands of modern aerial warfare. Excellent heart condition is required, as the increased "G's" a pilot experiences in a turn can cause stress on the cardiovascular system. One "G" is equal to the force of gravity experienced under normal conditions, two "G"s would be twice the force of normal gravity. Some fighter aircraft can accelerate to up to 9 G's. Fighter pilots also require strong muscle tissue along the extremities and abdomen, for performing an anti-G straining maneuver (AGSM, see below) when performing tight turns and other highly accelerated maneuvers. Better-than-average visual acuity is also a highly desirable and valuable trait.

== Tactics ==
=== Offensive ===
Modern medium and long range active radar homing and semi-active radar homing missiles can be fired at targets outside or beyond visual range. However, when a pilot is dogfighting at short-range, their position relative to the opponent is decidedly important. Outperformance of another pilot and that pilot's aircraft is critical to maintain the upper-hand. A common saying for dogfighting is "lose sight, lose fight".

If one pilot had a greater missile range than the other, they would choose to fire their missile first, before being in range of the enemy's missile. Normally, the facts of an enemy's weapon payload is unknown, and are revealed as the fight progresses.

Some air combat maneuvers form the basis for the sport of aerobatics:

- Basic
  - Split S
  - Immelmann turn
  - Thach Weave
  - The Scissors
  - Chandelle
- Complex
  - Pugachev's Cobra
  - Herbst maneuver

=== Defensive ===
Pilots are trained to employ specific tactics and maneuvers when they are under attack. Attacks from missiles are usually countered with electronic countermeasures, Flares and chaff. Missiles like the AIM-120 AMRAAM, however, can actively home in on jamming signals.

Dogfighting at 1 to 4 miles (1,600 to 6,400 m) is considered "close". Pilots perform stressful maneuvers to gain advantage in the dogfight. Pilots need to be in good shape in order to handle the high G-forces caused by aerial combat. Pilots flex their legs and torso to keep blood from draining out of the head. This is known as the AGSM or the M1 or, sometimes, as the "grunt".

=== Defense against missiles ===
Many early air-to-air and surface-to-air missiles had very simple infrared homing ("heat seeking") guidance systems with a narrow field of view. These missiles could be avoided by simply turning sharply, which essentially caused the missile to lose sight of the target aircraft. Another tactic was to exploit a missile's limited range by performing evasive maneuvers until the missiles had run out of fuel.

Modern infrared missiles, like the AIM-9 Sidewinder, have a more advanced guidance system. Supercooled infrared detectors help the missile find a possible exhaust source, and software assists the missile in flying towards its target. Pilots normally drop flares to confuse or decoy these missiles by creating more multiple heat signatures hotter than that of the aircraft for the missile to lock onto and guide away from the defending aircraft.

Radar homing missiles could sometimes be confused by surface objects or geographical features causing clutter for the guidance system of either the missile or ground station guiding it. Chaff is another option in the case that the aircraft is too high up to use geographical obstructions. Pilots have to be aware of the potential threats and learn to distinguish between the two where possible. They use the radar warning receiver (RWR) to discern the types of signals hitting their aircraft.

=== G-force ===
When maneuvering fiercely during engagements, pilots are subjected to high G-force. G-forces express the magnitude of gravity, with 1G being equivalent to Earth's normal pull of gravity. Because modern jet aircraft are highly agile and have the capacity to make very sharp turns, the pilot's body is often pushed to the limit.

When executing a "positive G" maneuver like turning upwards the force pushes the pilot down. The most serious consequence of this is that the blood in the pilot's body is also pulled down and into their extremities. If the forces are great enough and over a sufficient period of time this can lead to blackouts (called G-induced loss of consciousness or G-LOC), because not enough blood is reaching the pilot's brain. To counteract this effect pilots are trained to tense their legs and abdominal muscles to restrict the "downward" flow of blood. This is known as the "grunt" or the "Hick maneuver". Both names allude to the sounds the pilot makes, and is the primary method of resisting G-LOCs. Modern flight suits, called G-suits, are worn by pilots to contract around the extremities exerting pressure, providing about 1G of extra tolerance.

== Notable fighter pilots ==
Some notable fighter pilots, including some for being flying aces and others who went on to non-fighter pilot notability (record-breaking test pilots, astronauts and cosmonauts, politicians, business leaders, etc.):

- M M Alam (Pakistan)
- Marcel Albert (France)
- Buzz Aldrin (United States)
- Satoru Anabuki (Empire of Japan)
- Neil Armstrong (United States)
- Saiful Azam (Pakistan) (Bangladesh)
- Abbas Babaei (Iran)
- Douglas Bader (United Kingdom)
- Heinrich Bär (Nazi Germany)
- Francesco Baracca (Italy)
- Gerhard Barkhorn (Nazi Germany)
- Antonio Bautista (Philippines)
- George Beurling (Canada)
- George Beurling (Canada)
- Billy Bishop (Canada)
- Oswald Boelcke (German Empire)
- Richard Bong (United States)
- Maurice Boyau (France)
- John Boyd (United States)
- Gregory "Pappy" Boyington (United States)
- Yekaterina Budanova (Soviet Union)
- George H. W. Bush (United States)
- George W. Bush (United States)
- Clive Caldwell (Australia)
- Constantin Cantacuzino (Romania)
- Ahmet Ali Çelikten (Turkey)
- Pierre Clostermann (France)
- Michel Coiffard (France)
- Randy "Duke" Cunningham (United States)
- Roald Dahl (United Kingdom)
- Ali Eghbali Dogahe (Iran)
- Abbas Doran (Iran)
- Giora Epstein (Israel)
- Brendan Finucane (Republic of Ireland) (United Kingdom)
- René Fonck (France)
- Francis Gabreski (United States) (Poland)
- Adolf Galland (Nazi Germany)
- Joaquín García Morato (Francoist Spain)
- Sabiha Gökçen (Turkey)
- Gordon Gollob (Nazi Germany)
- Hermann Göring (German Empire)
- Georges Guynemer (France)
- Matt Hall (Australia)
- Erich Hartmann (Nazi Germany)
- Max Immelmann (German Empire)
- Tetsuzō Iwamoto (Empire of Japan)
- James Jabara (United States)
- Ilmari Juutilainen (Finland)
- Ivan Kozhedub (Soviet Union)
- Franco Lucchini (Kingdom of Italy)
- Frank Luke (United States)
- Georges Madon (France)
- Adolph Malan (Union of South Africa)
- Hans-Joachim Marseille (Nazi Germany)
- Martha McSally (United States)
- Rashid Minhas (Pakistan)
- Werner Mölders (Nazi Germany)
- Nguyễn Văn Bảy (North Vietnam)
- Nguyễn Văn Cốc (North Vietnam)
- Hiroyoshi Nishizawa (Empire of Japan)
- Walter Nowotny (Nazi Germany)
- Charles Nungesser (France)
- Robin Olds (United States)
- Toshio Ōta (Empire of Japan)
- Adolphe Pégoud (France)
- Monath Perera (Sri Lanka)
- Alexander Pokryshkin (Soviet Union)
- Matiur Rahman (Bangladesh)
- Günther Rall (Nazi Germany)
- Mohommed Rayyan (Iraq)
- Karl W. Richter (United States)
- R. Stephen Ritchie (United States)
- Shahram Rostami (Iran)
- Indra Lal Roy (India)
- Saburo Sakai (Empire of Japan)
- Heinz-Wolfgang Schnaufer (Nazi Germany)
- Nirmal Jit Singh Sekhon (India)
- Alexandru Șerbănescu (Romania)
- Yadollah Sharifirad (Iran)
- Hiromichi Shinohara (Empire of Japan)
- Stanisław Skalski (Poland)
- Scott Speicher (United States)
- Johannes Steinhoff (Nazi Germany)
- Franz Stigler (Nazi Germany)
- Max Stotz (Nazi Germany)
- Władysław Turowicz (Poland)
- Ernst Udet (German Empire)
- Abhinandan Varthaman (India)
- Mario Visintini (Kingdom of Italy)
- Manfred von Richthofen (German Empire)
- Kurt Welter (Nazi Germany)
- Chuck Yeager (United States)
- Jalil Zandi (Iran)

== Female fighter pilots ==
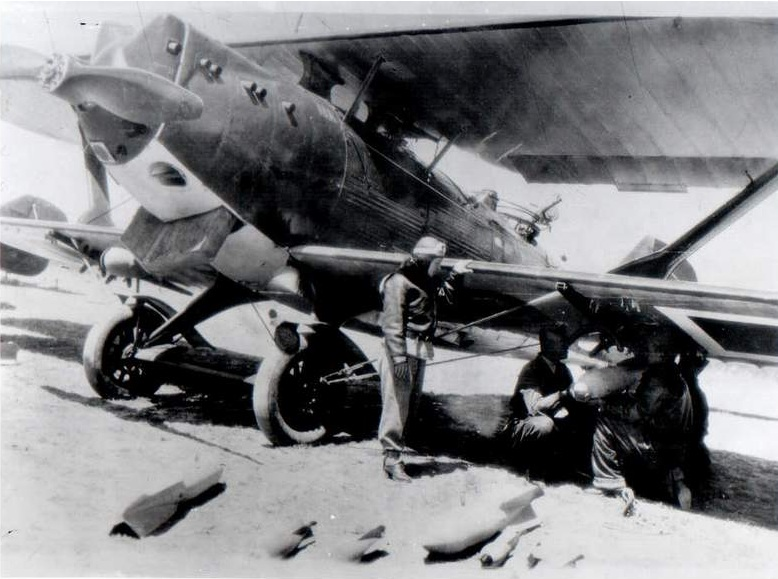
Sabiha Gökçen in front of a Breguet 19, circa 1937.

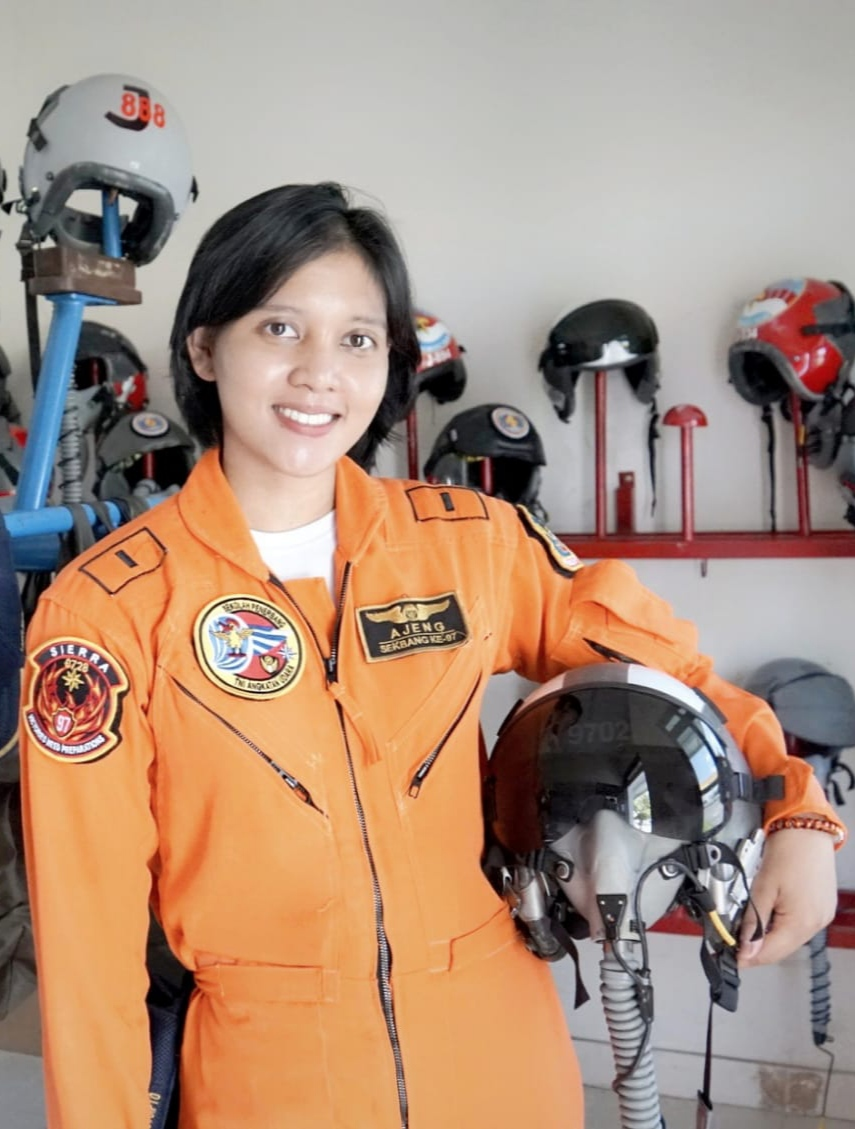
2nd Lt. Ajeng Tresna Dwi Wijayanti, Indonesia's first female fighter pilot – 2020

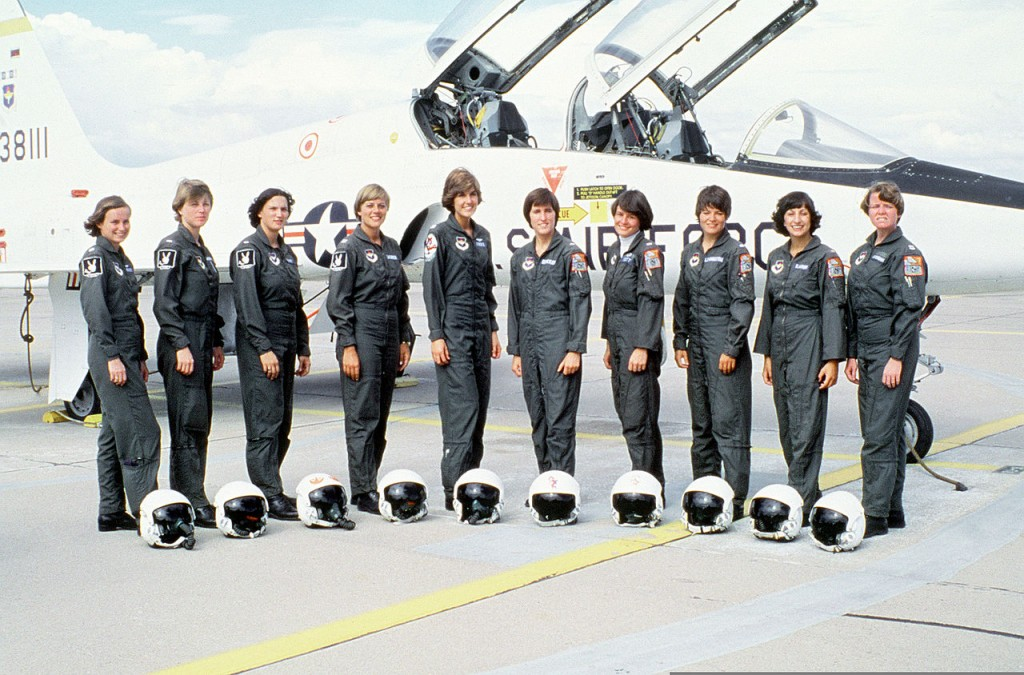
USAF Air Force Undergraduate Pilot Training Class 77-08

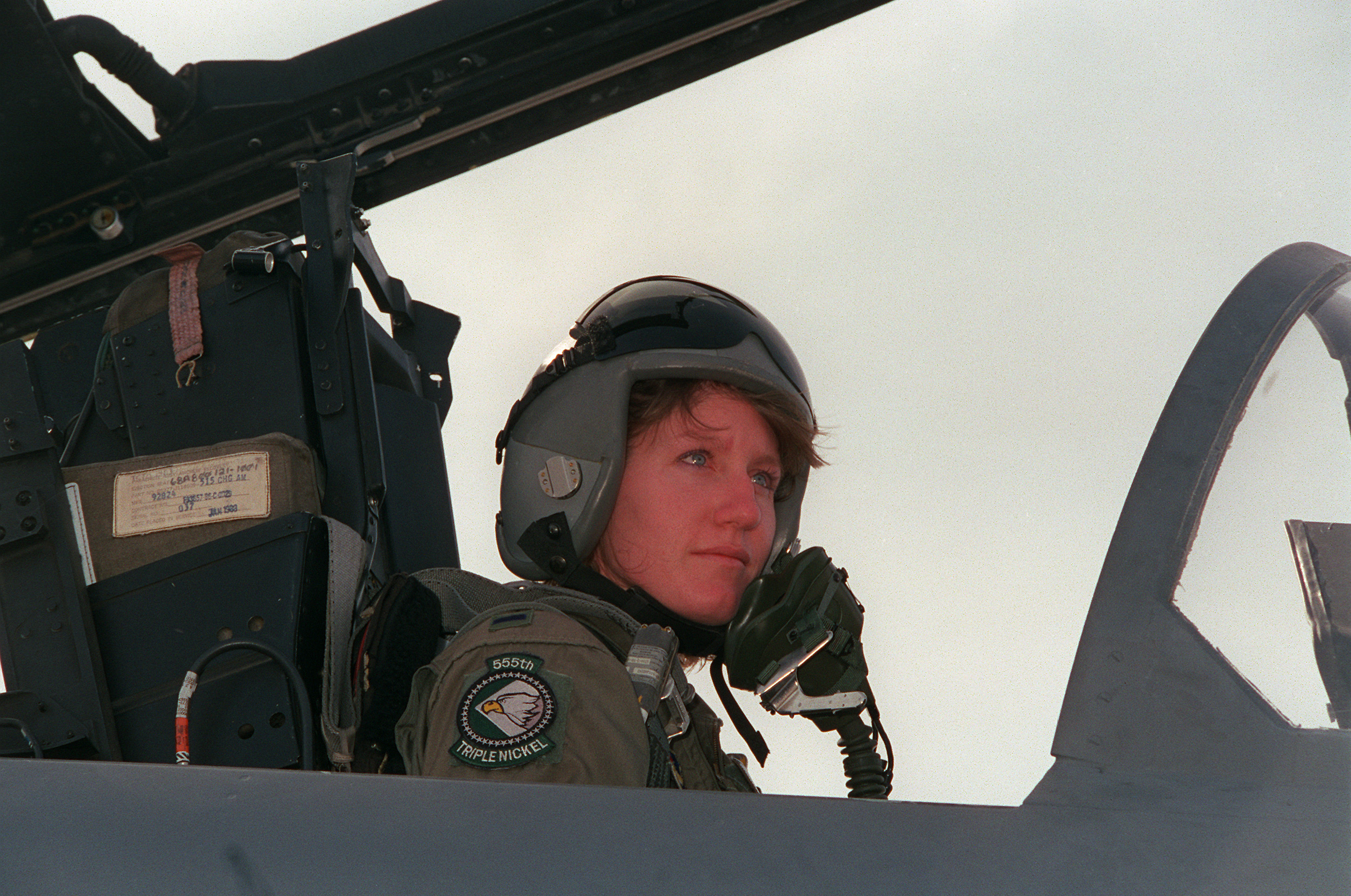
Maj. General (then-1st Lt.) Jeannie Leavitt

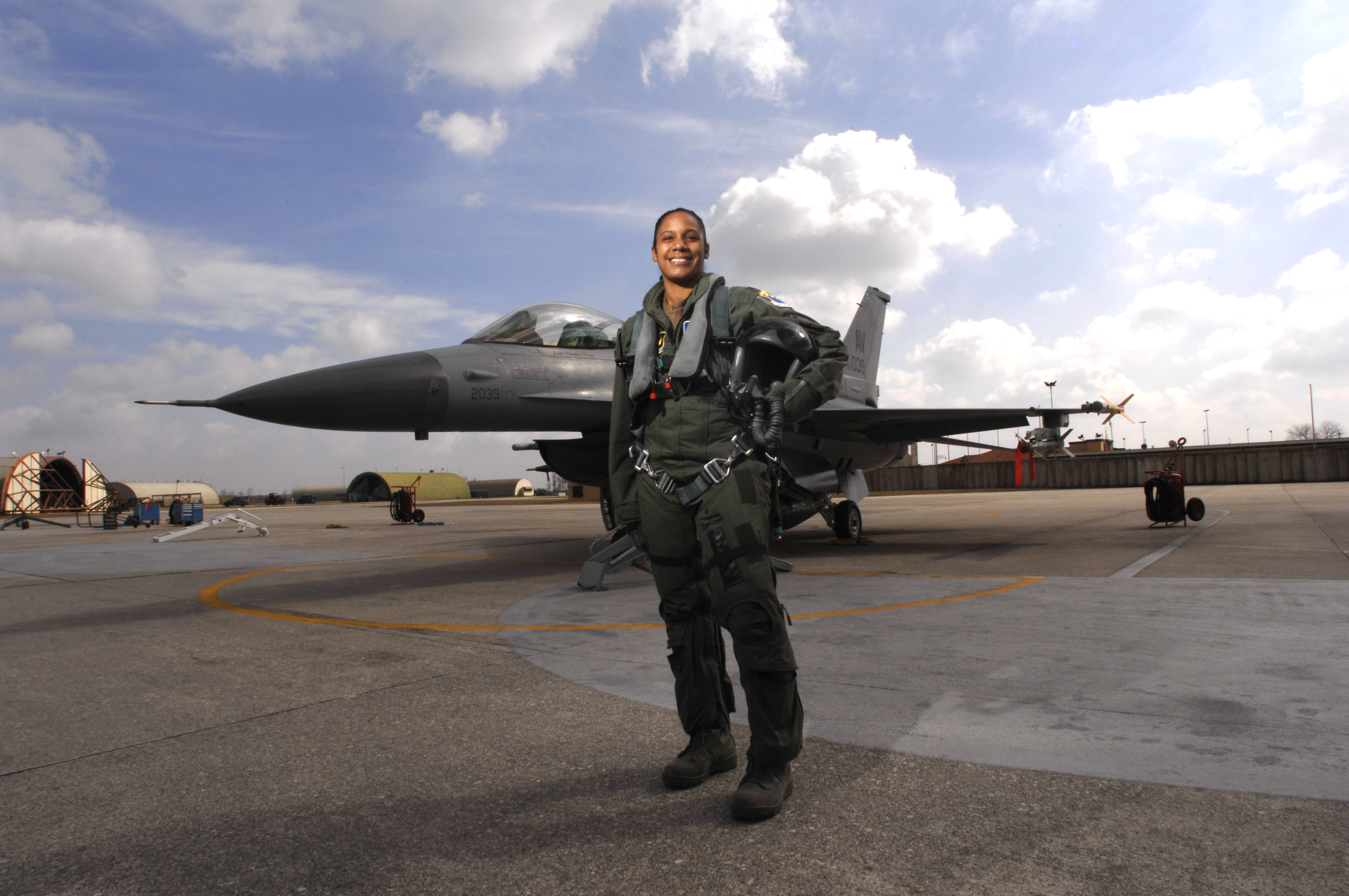
Lt. Col. Shawna Kimbrell, US Air Force's first African American female fighter pilot

Nicole Malachowski, The First Lady Pilot of Thunderbirds Airshow Team

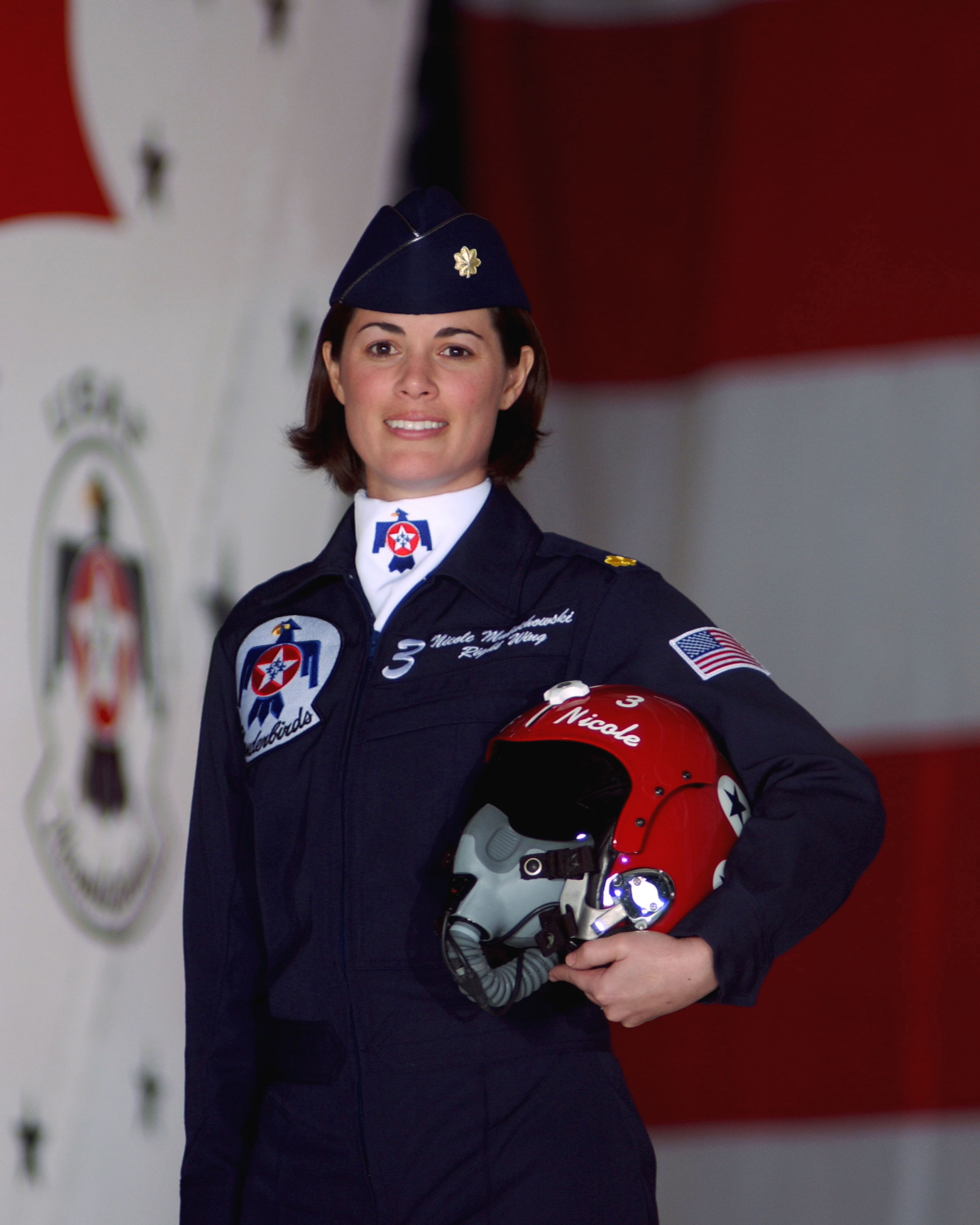
USAF Thunderbirds portrait

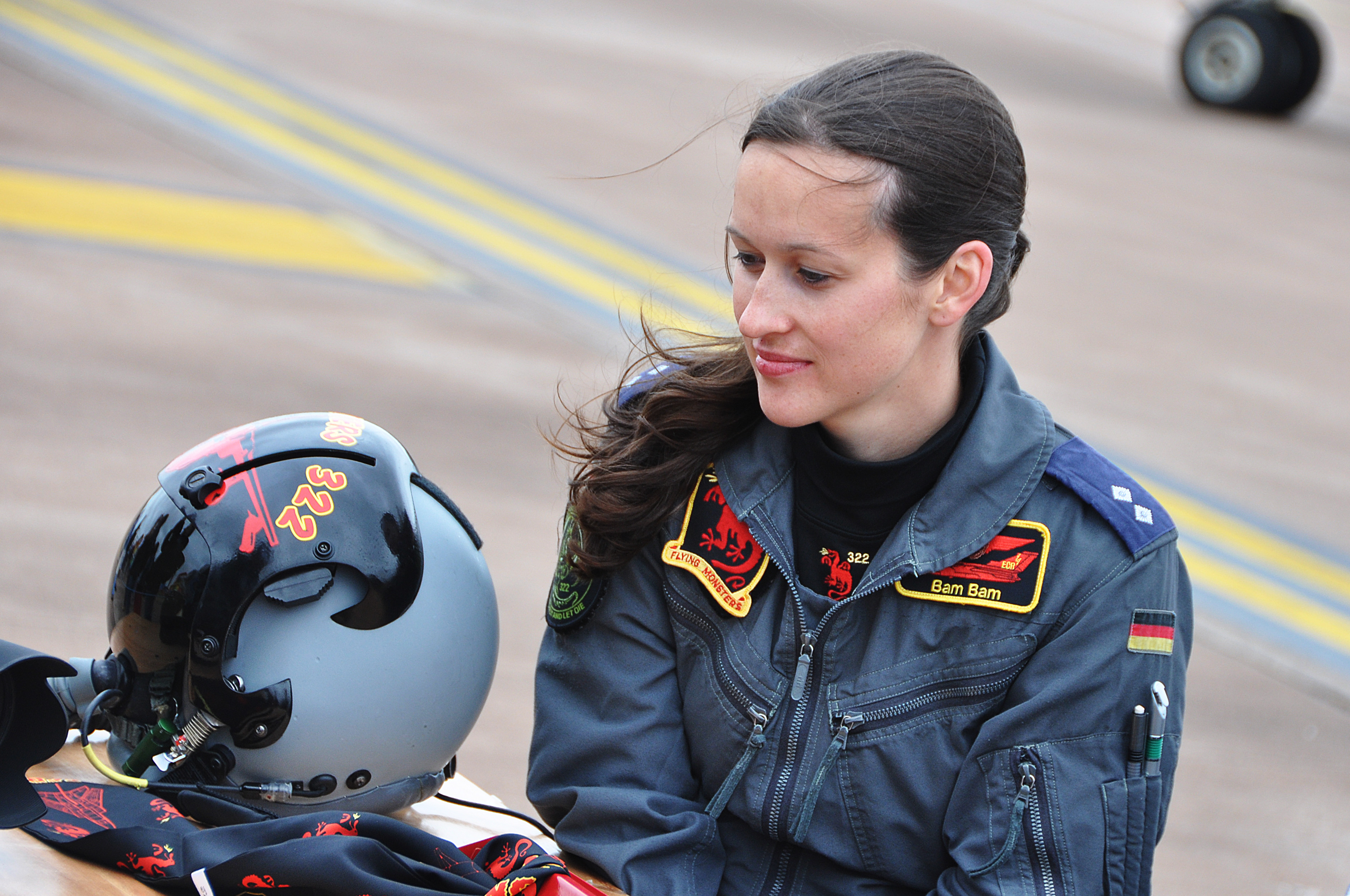
Nicola Baumann, 2nd female fighter pilot of Luftwaffe (GAF) with her ECR Tornado aircraft

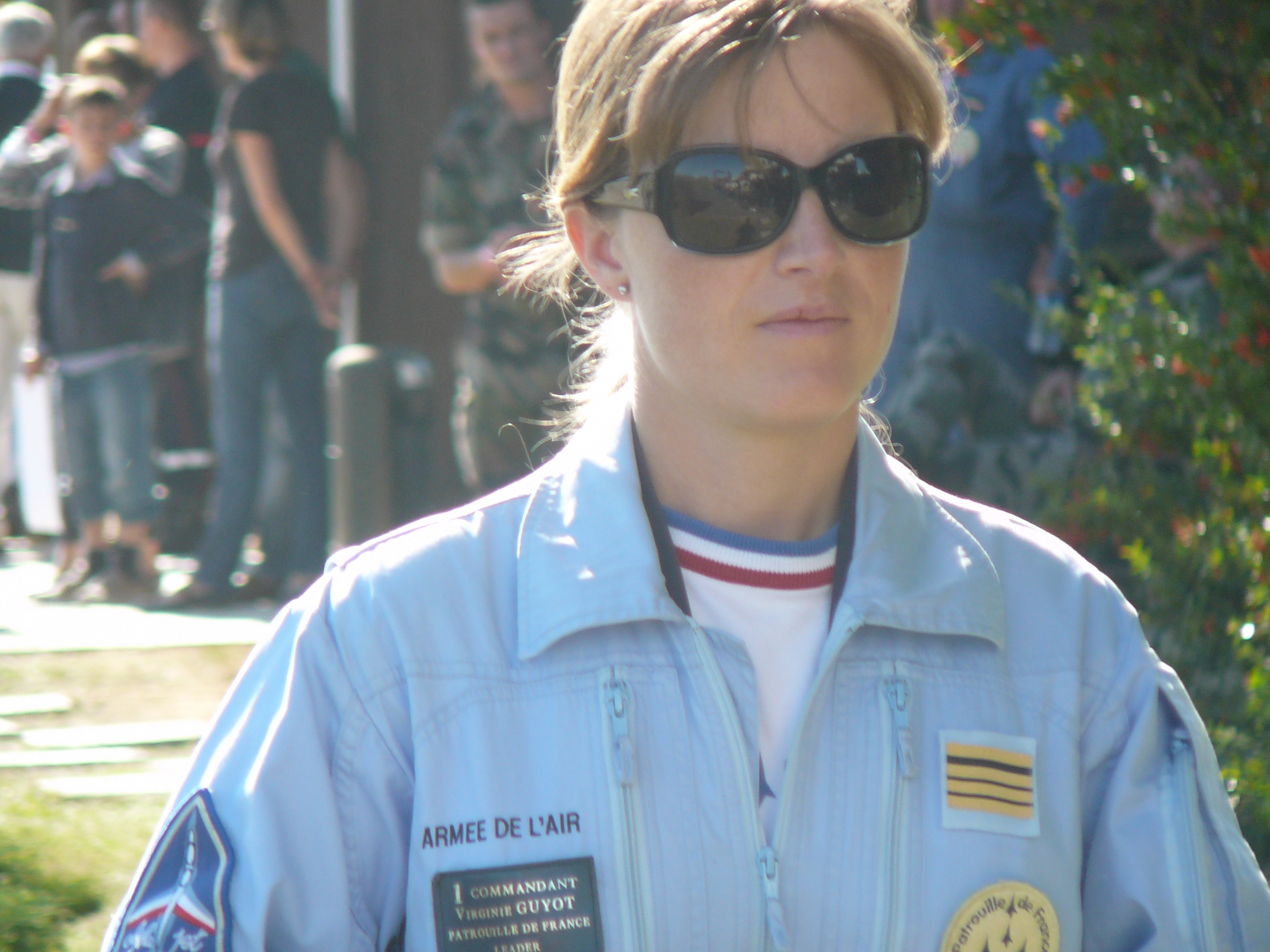
Virginie Guyot leader Patrouille de France

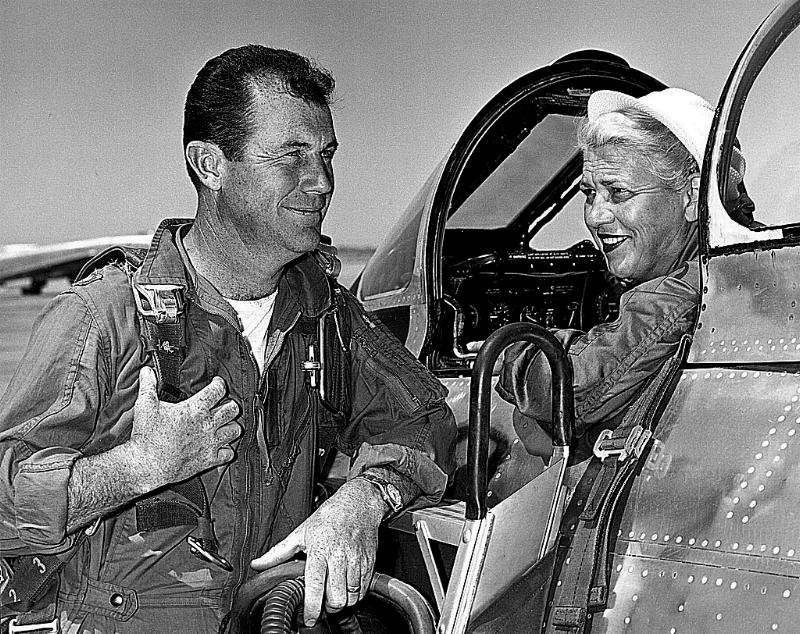
Cochran in her record-setting F-86, talking with Charles E. Yeager

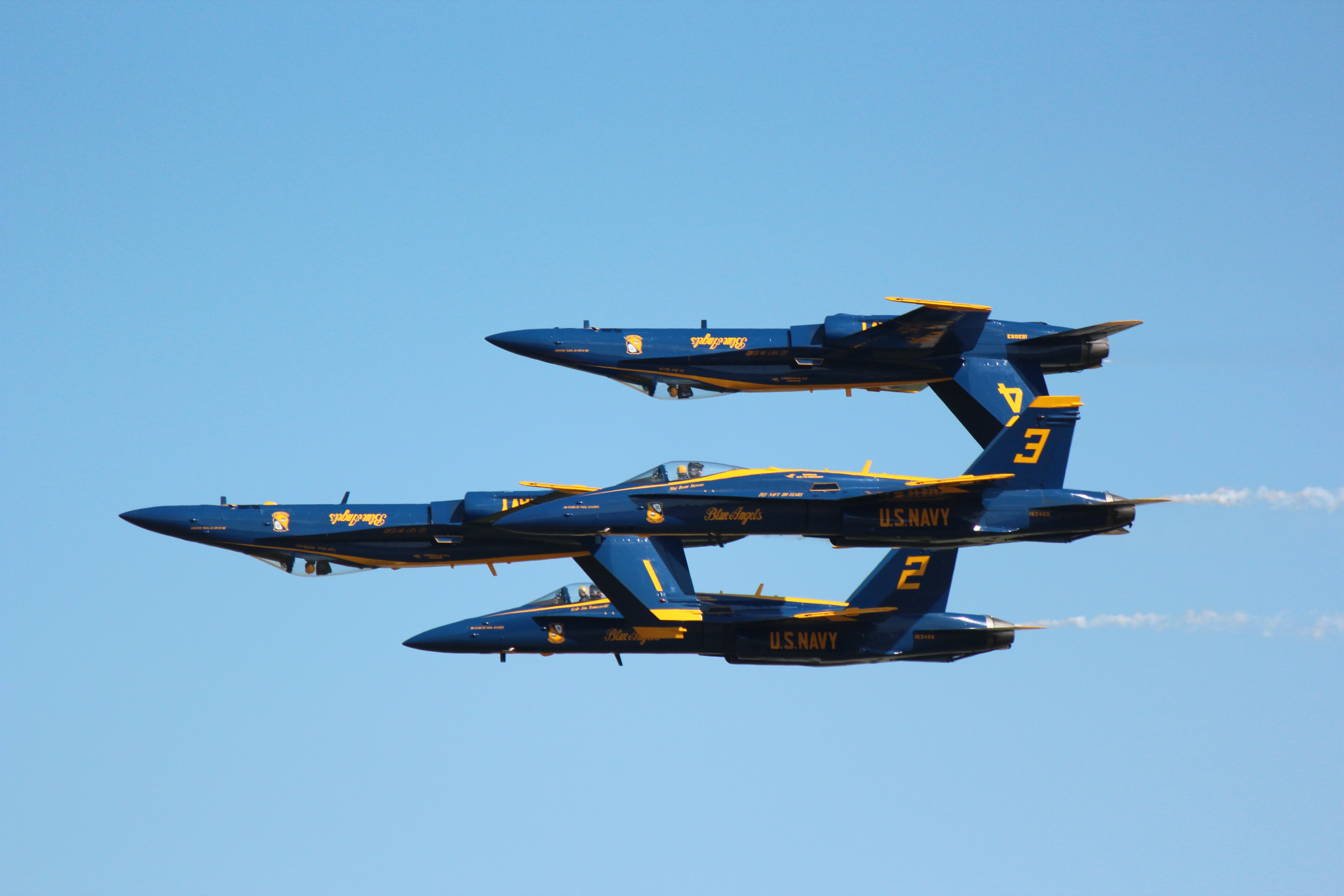
US Navy Blue Angels double farvel

Sabiha Gökçen became the first female fighter pilot in Turkey in 1936 and went on to fly fast jets well into the 1950s and many women were trained as fighter pilots in the 586th Fighter Aviation Regiment including Lilya Litvyak who had 12 kills followed by Katya Budanova with 11, both of whom were killed in combat.

- Bulgaria – On 30 October 1912 Rayna Kasabova became the world's first woman in the world who participated in a military flight on a Voisin aircraft above Edirne during the First Balkan War.
- France – Marie Marvingt was a record-breaking balloonist, an aviator, and during World War I she became the first female combat pilot. Marie Marvingt received a pilot's license from the Aéro-Club de France (Aero Club of France) on 8 November 1910. Licensed No. 281, she was the third Frenchwoman to be registered after Raymonde de Laroche (No. 36) and Marthe Niel (No. 226). In her first 900 flights she never "broke wood" in a crash, a record unequaled at that time. Marie flew in a number of air meets, bombed a German airbase twice as an unofficial pilot in World War I, flew on reconnaissance missions in the "pacification" of North Africa, and was the only woman to hold four pilot's licenses simultaneously: balloon, airplane, hydroplane and helicopter. In 1915 Marvingt became the first woman in the world to fly combat missions when she became a volunteer pilot flying bombing missions over German-held territory and she received the Croix de guerre (Military Cross) for her aerial bombing of a German military base in Metz.
- Turkey – In 1936 Sabiha Gökçen became world's first female combat pilot while in 1958 Leman Altınçekiç was first female accredited jet pilot in NATO.
- Soviet Union - Lydia Vladimirovna Litvyak was a fighter pilot in the Soviet Air Force during World War II. She was the first female fighter pilot to shoot down an enemy aircraft, the first of two female fighter pilots who have earned the title of fighter ace and the holder of the record for the greatest number of kills by a female fighter pilot. She was shot down near Orel during the Battle of Kursk as she attacked a formation of German aircraft. She was nicknamed the "White Lily of Stalingrad".
- Soviet Union - Yekaterina "Katya" Budanova was another fighter pilot in the Soviet Air Force during World War II and along with Lydia Litvyak, she is often considered one of the world's two female fighter aces credited with five or more aerial victories, She was shot down by either Luftwaffe ace Georg Schwientek of JG 52 or ace Emil Bitsch, of JG 3.
- Soviet Union - Mariya Kuznetsova was a Soviet fighter pilot who originally flew with the women's 586th Fighter Aviation Regiment but was later transferred to the 437th Fighter Aviation Regiment with Yekaterina Budanova, Lydia Litvyak, and several other members of the unit in September 1942. She flew over 100 sorties.
- Soviet Union - Raisa Belyaeva was one of the first Russian female fighter pilots. She fought alongside Lydia Litvyak and was credited with up to three aerial victories. She died in combat in a crash on 19 July 1943.
- Soviet Union - Mariya Tolstova a Soviet flight commander in the 175th Guards Attack Aviation Regiment, and one of the few women to fly the Il-2.
- Soviet Union - Tamara Kazarinova was a Soviet pilot and the commander of the 586th Fighter Aviation Regiment during the Second World War.
- Soviet Union - Olga Yamshchikova was Soviet fighter pilot squadron commander, credited with three shootdowns during World War II who became a test pilot after the war. During her postwar aviation career she became the first woman to fly the MiG-19.
- Soviet Union - Tamara Konstantinova was Ilyushin Il-2 pilot and deputy squadron commander in the Soviet Air Force during the Second World War.
- Soviet Union - Lidiya Shulaykina was one of the few women Ilyushin Il-2 pilots and the only female ground-attack pilot in naval aviation during the Second World War.
- USA - Jacqueline "Jackie" Cochran was a pioneer in women's aviation, one of the most prominent racing pilots of her generation. She set numerous records and was the first woman to break the sound barrier on 18 May 1953 in an F-86 Sabrejet. She was the wartime head of the Women Airforce Service Pilots (WASP) (1943–1944), which employed about 1000 American military women in a role to ferry airplanes from factories to port cities. On September 9, 1948, Cochran joined the U.S. Air Force Reserve as a lieutenant colonel. She was promoted to colonel in 1969 and retired in 1970. Postwar, Cochran began flying new jet aircraft, setting numerous records. She became the first woman pilot to "go supersonic". Among her many record accomplishments, from August to October 1961, as a consultant to Northrop Corporation, Cochran set a series of speed, distance and altitude records while flying a Northrop T-38A-30-NO Talon supersonic trainer. On the final day of the record series, she set two Fédération Aéronautique Internationale (FAI) world records, taking the T-38 to altitudes of 55,252.625 feet (16,841 m) in horizontal flight and reaching a peak altitude of 56,072.835 feet (17,091 m). Cochran was also the first woman to land and take off from an aircraft carrier, the first woman to pilot a bomber across the North Atlantic (in 1941) and later to fly a jet aircraft on a transatlantic flight, the first woman to make a blind (instrument) landing, the only woman ever to be president of the Fédération Aéronautique Internationale (1958–1961), the first woman to fly a fixed-wing, jet aircraft across the Atlantic, the first pilot to fly above 20,000 feet (6,096 m) with an oxygen mask, and the first woman to enter the Bendix Transcontinental Race. She still holds more distance and speed records than any pilot living or dead, male or female.
- France - Jacqueline Auriol was a French aviator who set several world speed records. She earned a military pilot license in 1950 then qualified as one of the first female test pilots. She was among the first women to break the sound barrier and set five world speed records in the 1950s and 1960s in French fighter jets like the Mystère and Dassault Mirages.
- North Korea - In late 1952, with the Korean War in full swing, the North Korean Air Force was the only one in the world with female jet fighter pilots. One of them, Tha Sen Hi, flew MiG-15s in combat and eventually rose to squadron leader. She was honoured with the title of Hero of the Korean People's Democratic Republic.
- Somalia – Asli Hassan Asli Hassan Abade – on 9 September 1976, is the first African female pilot in the (Somali Air Force – SAF). She soloed her first flight – MiG-21.
- USA – Captain Rosemary "Sabre" Bryant Mariner was an American jet pilot and one of the first six women to earn their wings as a United States Naval Aviator in 1974. She was the first female military pilot to fly a tactical jet and the first to achieve command of an operational aviation squadron. She was designated a Naval Aviator in June 1974 and became one of the first six women to earn their wings as a United States Naval Aviator, alongside Barbara Allen Rainey, Jane Skiles O'Dea, Judith Ann Neuffer, Ana Marie Fuqua, and Joellen Drag. In 1975, Mariner was one of the first female military aviators to fly a tactical strike aircraft, a single seat A-4L Skyhawk. In 1976, she transitioned to the A-7E Corsair II, making her the first woman to fly a front-line tactical strike aircraft. During Operation Desert Storm in 1990, she commanded US Navy Tactical Electronic Warfare Squadron Thirty Four (VAQ-34).
- USA - In the 1970s, women were again, for the first time since WWII, permitted to fly in the United States Armed Forces, beginning with the Navy and the Army in 1974, and then the Air Force in 1976. The first graduating class of ten female Air Force officers earned their Silver Wings on September 2, 1977. These ten women were part of Class 77-08 and graduated at Williams Air Force Base. These female aviators were Captains Connie Engel, Kathy La Sauce, Mary Donahue, Susan Rogers and Christine Schott; First Lieutenants Sandra Scott and Victoria Crawford; Second Lieutenants Mary Livingston, Carol Scherer and Kathleen Rambo.
- USA - On 2 May 1977 First Lieutenant Christine E. Schott, USAF, was the first woman in the Air Force Undergraduate Pilot Training Program to solo in the Northrop T-38A Talon supersonic flight trainer at Williams AFB, Arizona. She was a member of Class 77–08, which entered on 19 September 1976.
- Russia - Svetlana Savitskaya is a Russian former jet aviator and Soviet cosmonaut who flew aboard Soyuz T-7 in 1982, becoming the second woman in space. On her 1984 Soyuz T-12 mission she became the first woman to fly to space twice, and the first woman to perform a spacewalk. After graduating from the Moscow Aviation Institute (MAI) in 1972, she trained as a test pilot at the Fedotov Test Pilot School, graduating in 1976. In May 1978 she start working for aircraft manufacturer Yakovlev, as a test pilot. Between 1969 and 1977 she was a member of the Soviet national aerobatics team. Savitskaya retired in 1993 from the Russian Air Force in the rank of Major. She set several FAI world records as a MiG-21 & MiG-25 pilot.
- Algeria – In 1982 Hakima Abdessamad became the first Algerian female fighter pilot in the Algerian Air Force after qualifying to fly the MiG-15, the MiG-17 and the MiG-21.
- Canada – In 1989 Dee Brasseur and Jane Foster became the first female fighter pilots in the Royal Canadian Air Force after qualifying to fly the CF-18 Hornet.
- Sweden – In 1991 Anna Dellham became Sweden's first female fighter pilot serving with a Viggen squadron, before in 2011 qualifying to fly the Gripen.
- Norway – In 1992 Mette "Jet-Mette" Grøtteland became the first female fighter pilot in the Royal Norwegian Air Force after qualifying to fly the General Dynamics F-16 Fighting Falcon.
- Netherlands – Between 1993 and 1997 Manja Blok the first female fighter pilot in the Royal Netherlands Air Force was active flying a General Dynamics F-16 Fighting Falcon over Bosnia enforcing the no fly zone. She had qualified on the F-16 in 1991.
- USA – In 1993 Jeannie "Tally" Leavitt became the first female USAF fighter pilot, initially being assigned to a McDonnell Douglas F-15E Strike Eagle squadron, and subsequently flying 300 combat hours, mostly over Afghanistan and Iraq. She was the first woman to command a USAF combat fighter wing, the 4th Fighter Wing on June 14, 2012 . She became commander of a second fighter wing on April 16, 2016, taking command of the 57th Wing at the Nellis Air Force Base. She is the first woman fighter pilot in the USAF who got promoted to the high rank of major general on September 2, 2019. She logged more than 3,000 fight hours as pilot in command, including over 300 combat hours.
- UK – In 1994 Jo Salter was declared combat ready by the Royal Air Force flying a Panavia Tornado in 617 Squadron becoming Britain's first female fighter pilot.
- Belgium – In 1994 Anne-Marie "Mie" Jansen becomes the first Belgian female fighter pilot, flying the General Dynamics F-16 Fighting Falcon. She also survived a F-16 mishap, ejecting safely, after running of the runway and collapsing inverted on May 12, 1995.
- USA – Then Lieutenant Bobbi J. Doorenbos became the first female USAF Air National Guard F-16 fighter pilot with the 185th Fighter Wing in June 1997. In 2015, by then promoted to colonel, she became the first female commander of the 188th Fighter Wing of the Arkansas Air National Guard. Doorenbos a senior fighter pilot with more than 1,200 hours in the F-16C got promoted to the first female brigadier general of the USAF Air National Guard on September 28, 2017.
- USA – In August 1999 Lieutenant Colonel Shawna Rochelle Kimbrell became the first female African-American fighter pilot in the history of the US Air Force. She flew the F-16 Fighting Falcon during combat missions in Operation Northern Watch and is stationed at Nellis Air Force Base.
- France – In 1999 Caroline Aigle became the first woman to receive the French Air Force's coveted fighter pilot wings. She was assigned to fly the Mirage 2000-5.
- Canada – In November 2000, Maryse Carmichael was selected to fly with the Canadian Forces Snowbirds aerobatic team, becoming the first woman on the team. In May 2010 she was named the commander of the Snowbirds, becoming the first female pilot to lead the squad.
- South Africa – Catherine "Siren" Labuschagne got her wings in 2000 and flew the Impala and Hawk before in 2010 completing her maiden solo flight in the South African Air Force's Gripen Jas 39C, becoming the first woman fighter pilot ever to fly the Gripen.
- Turkey – In 2000, fighter pilot Berna Şen Şenol paved the way for other Turkish women by becoming the first female F-16 pilot to fly for the Turkish Air Force.
- Israel – In 2001 Roni Zuckerman became the first Israeli woman to qualify as a fighter pilot. She was assigned to an F-16 squadron as a fighter pilot and also later became a commander at the IAF flight academy. She was released from active service in 2007, although continued to do reserve duty.
- Finland – In 2002 Inka Niskanen became Finland's first female fighter pilot, flying BAE Hawks and F/A-18 Hornets. In January 2019, Niskanen took command of the Karelia Air Command 31 Squadron, as the first woman to hold such a post in Finland.
- Uruguay – In 2002 María Eugenia Etcheverry, A-37B Dragonfly pilot and Carolina Arévalo, IA 58 Pucará pilot became first female fighter pilots in both Uruguayan Air Force and Latin America.
- Singapore – In 2003 Khoo Teh Lynn became Singapore's first female fighter pilot, flying General Dynamics F-16 Fighting Falcons.
- Denmark – In 2005 Line Bonde graduated from the Euro-NATO Joint Jet Pilot Training program at Sheppard Air Force Base in Texas, US, as Denmark's first female fighter pilot flying the F-16 Fighting Falcon.
- Italy - Samantha Cristoforetti is an Italian European Space Agency astronaut, and former Italian Air Force fighter pilot and engineer. She holds the record for the longest uninterrupted spaceflight by a European astronaut (199 days, 16 hours), She graduated in Aeronautics Sciences (University 'Federico II', Naples) at the Accademia Aeronautica in Pozzuoli, becoming one of the first women to be a lieutenant and fighter pilot in the Italian Air Force. In 2005/2006 as part of her training in the US, she completed the Euro-NATO Joint Jet Pilot Training (ENJJPT) program. She has logged over 500 hours and has flown six types of military aircraft: SF-260, T-37, T-38, MB-339A, MB-339CD and AM-X. She was assigned to 51° Stormo, 132° Gruppo.
- USA From November 2005 till November 2007 (now retired) Colonel Nicole "Fifi" Malachowski was the first female pilot selected to fly as part of the USAF Air Demonstration Squadron, better known as the Thunderbirds in their F-16 Fighting Falcons. Prior to that she was an F-15E Pilot, Instructor Pilot, Chief of Life Support, Assistant Chief of Scheduling, Weapons Flight Electronic Combat Pilot, Functional Check Flight Pilot, Supervisor of Flying at the 336th Fighter Squadron. On 18 November 2011, she took command of the 333d Fighter Squadron at Seymour Johnson Air Force Base, North Carolina. After successfully completing her tour with the USAF Thunderbirds in November 2007, including approximately 140 performances, Malachowski served on staff of the Commander, United States Air Force Warfare Center, at Nellis Air Force Base, Nevada, to June 2008.
- France - In January 2006, then ensign Émilie "Eva" Denis, became the first woman fighter pilot of the French Navy flying the Dassault-Breguet Super Étendard aboard the French aircraft carrier Charles de Gaulle.
- Pakistan - In March 2006, the Pakistan Air Force officially inducted a batch of 34 fighter pilots which included the organization's first four female fighter pilots. Three years of fighter pilot training had been completed by the pilots at PAF Academy - Risalpur flying amongst other the Cessna T-37 Tweet basic jet trainer and K-8 intermediate jet trainer, before they graduated and were awarded their Flying Badges during the ceremony. Certificates of honour were handed to the successful cadets by General Ahsan Saleem Hayat, then the vice-chief of the Pakistan Army, who acknowledged that the PAF was the first branch of the Pakistani military to introduce women to its combat units. One of the women, Flying Officer Nadia Gul, was awarded a trophy for best academic achievement. The other female graduates were Mariam Khalil, Saira Batool and Cadet Saba Khan. A second batch of pilots, including three female pilots, graduated from the 117th Pilot course at PAF Academy - Risalpur in September 2006. The Sword of Honour for best all-round performance was awarded to Aviation Cadet Saira Amin, the first female pilot to win the award. Aviation Cadet Saira Amin also had won the Asghar Hussain Trophy for best performance in academics.
- Spain - Rosa García-Malea López became the first female fighter pilot in the Spanish Air Force after qualifying to fly F/A-18 Hornet jet fighter aircraft in 2006. With more than 1,250 flight hours and after participating in the Libyan war in 2011, after 15 years service in Spanish air force, she joined Patrulla Águila the aerobatic demonstration team as a Casa C-101 pilot.
- Chile – In 2006 Karina Miranda started her flight training on Northrop F-5 and made her solo flight with F-5 Tiger III on April 29, 2010, became first female fighter pilot in Chilean Air Force.
- Malaysia – In 2007 Patricia Yapp Syau Yin from Royal Malaysian Air Force became the first Asian female fighter Pilot for Mikoyan MiG-29 after four years for flying an Aermacchi MB-339CM. She also performed inside RMAF aerobatics team, Smokey Bandits inside the squadrons.
- Germany – In 2007 Ulrike Flender graduated from Euro-NATO Joint Jet Pilot Training program to become Germany's first female fighter pilot and the first German woman to pilot the Tornado and later from 2013 the Eurofighter Typhoon .
- Germany - In 2007 then Oberleutnant Nicola "Niki Bam Bam" Winter – Baumann became the second female fighter pilot in the history of the German Air Force flying both Tornado and Eurofighter Typhoon in the German Air Force. As a fighter pilot, now Major, Nicola Baumann applied to be Germany's first female astronaut among 86 candidates on the list as of September 2016 and was one of 30 women taking part in the final selection process as of December 2016. She was selected as one of two winners, but later withdrew from the programme.
- Morocco - In 2007 Sub-Lieutenant Hanae Zarouali became the first Moroccan female jet pilot in service of the Royal Moroccan Air Force.
- South Korea – In 2008 Ha Jeong-mi became the first South Korean female fighter pilot, flying the KF-16 fighter.
- UK - On 13 May 2009, the Red Arrows announced including their first female display pilot. Flt. Lt. Kirsty Moore (née Stewart) joined for the 2010 season. She joined the Royal Air Force in 1998 and was a qualified flying instructor on the Hawk aircraft at RAF Valley. Prior to joining the team, she flew the Tornado GR4 at RAF Marham.
- Ukraine – Nadiya Savchenko is a former Army aviation pilot in the Ukrainian Ground Forces, one of Ukraine's first women to train as a military aeroplane pilot in 2009, and is the only female aviator to pilot the Sukhoi Su-24 bomber and the Mil Mi-24 helicopter.
- France – Commandant Virginie Guyot a Mirage F1-CR fighter pilot of the Armée de l'Air who achieved an historical first when she was appointed leader of the Patrouille de France, becoming the first woman in the world to command a precision aerobatic demonstration team on 25 November 2009. At the same time, she was the first woman to join the Patrouille de France, one of the world's oldest and most skilled demonstration teams.
- USA – In 2011 the first all-female U.S. Air Force combat mission was flown by Maj. Christine Mau, Maj. Tracy Schmidt, Capt. Leigh Larkin, and Capt. Jennifer Morton, called the "Strike Eagles of 'Dudette 07'". They flew two F-15E jets in a sortie over Afghanistan.
- Brazil – On May 3, 2011, Carla Alexandre Borges became the first woman to fly an FAB AMX A-1 fighter aircraft.
- USA – In 2011 Lt. Col. (then Major) Caroline "Blaze" Jensen was the third woman and the first mother to fly in the USAF Air Demonstration Squadron Thunderbirds team. As the daughter of a Marine helicopter pilot in Vietnam, she graduated from the Air Force Academy with a bachelor's degree in English and spent more than 10 years on active duty as a reservist with more than 3500 flying hours. She's the first female reserve officer to fly with the Thunderbirds. She also flew over 200 combat hours in the F-16 Fighting Falcon over Iraq. Jensen also became the first qualified female pilot in the T-7A Red Hawk.
- Poland – In 2012 it was reported that Katarzyna Tomiak had become a Mig-29 fighter pilot in the Polish Air Force.
- China – In 2013 China publicised the graduation of six of the PLAAF's first-batch of female fighter pilots.
- Pakistan – In 2013 Ayesha Farooq became Pakistan's first female fighter pilot flying the Chinese-made F-7PG fighter jet. Out of six female fighter pilots in the PAF, Flight Lieutenant Farooq is the first qualified for combat and to fly sorties along the border. Farooq is one of 19 women to have become pilots in the PAF since the 2000s.
- USA – On 22 December 2013 Cmdr. Sara Annette "Clutch" Joyner became the first female strike fighter pilot to command a Navy carrier air wing after earlier commanded a US Navy fighter squadron. She became a fighter pilot in 1996, flying an F/A-18 Hornet with VFA-147. She assumed command of Strike Fighter Squadron 105 from Cmdr. Douglas C. Verissimo on 2 March 2007 as the first female to do so. She turned over command to Cmdr. Thomas R. Tennant on 9 June 2008. She later became deputy commander of Carrier Air Wing Three, assuming full command from Capt. Michael S. Wallace on 4 January 2013. The air wing embarked on a deployment aboard USS Harry S. Truman on 22 July 2013. She commanded the air wing until relieved by Capt. George M. Wikoff.
- USA - In February 2014 Major General Sherrie L. McCandless became the first woman to command the 124th Fighter Wing and, therefore, the first female wing commander in Idaho Air National Guard history. She is an experienced F-16C/D Fighter Pilot and Instructor Pilot and has commanded units at the squadron levels. She is the Commanding General, District of Columbia National Guard.
- Czech Republic – In 2014 Lt. Katerina Hlavsova became the first female Czech Air Force Aero L-39 Albatros and L-159 Fighter Pilot.
- United Arab Emirates – In 2014 Mariam al-Mansuri was UAEs first female fighter pilot, flying General Dynamics F-16 Fighting Falcons in combat missions against ISIS in Syria.
- Taiwan – In 2014 three female aviators graduated from the Taiwanese Air Force Academy's class, becoming the nation's first female fighter pilots Cpt. Chiang Ching-hua pilots the Mirage 2000, Cpt. Chiang Hui-yu pilots the F-16 Fighting Falcon, and Cpt. Fan Yi-lin who pilots the Indigenous Defense Fighter (IDF) the AIDC F-CK-1 Ching-kuo.
- USA - Lt. Col. Christine "Grinder" Mau of the U.S. Air Force became the first U.S. female pilot to fly the F-35 Lightning II jet in 2015.
- India – In June 2016 Flight cadets Avani Chaturvedi of Madhya Pradesh, Mohana Singh of Rajasthan and Bhawana Kanth of Bihar, all in their early-20s, bring in a new era for the Indian defense forces. Mohana Singh Jitarwal became the first Indian women fighter pilot fully operational on the Hawk Mk.132 advance jet trainer. Chaturvedi became the first Indian woman pilot to take a solo flight in a MIG-21 Bison and was promoted to the rank of Flight Lieutenant in 2018. Chaturvedi is now part of Indian Air Force No. 23 Squadron Panthers. Kanth, who like the two others first trained on BAE Hawk Mk.132 advance jet trainers, is now flying the MIG-21 Bison with the Indian Air Force's No. 3 Squadron Cobras.
- Greece - In 2016 Ioanna Chrysaugi became the first Greek female fighter pilot flying the RF-4E Phantom II in the Hellenic Air Force. Squadron Leader Chrysaugi now is a pilot trainer.
- Zambia – In 2016 Thokozile Muwamba became the first female fighter pilot in Zambia, flying the K-8 and the L-15Z in the Zambian Air Force.
- Canada – In 2016 Capt. Sarah Dallaire, made history as the first husband-and-wife team to fly with the same Canadian Snowbirds 431 Air Demonstration Squadron. Dallaire, only the 2nd Snowbird female pilot ever, flew in the Canadair CT-114 Tutor as Snowbird 2 on the inner right wing, while her husband Capt. Kevin Domon-Grenier, flew as Snowbird 5 in the second line astern position.
- USA – In 2017 Capt. Kelsey "Pug" Casey became the United States Marine Corps' only female AV-8B Harrier "jump jet" pilot. She also made another unique move. She was selected to enter training to join the Joint Strike Fighter F35B Lightning II program as the first female Harrier pilot in 2019.
- Australia – In December 2017 Australia graduated its first female jet fighter pilots.
- Zimbabwe – Squadron Leader Angeline Bosha qualified as a fighter jet pilot after she completed a year-long training course in China in the year 2018 flying the K-8 Karakorum as Zimbabwe's first female fighter jet pilot.
- Japan – In August 2018 First lieutenant Misa Matsushima became the first Japanese female fighter pilot, flying the F-15J Eagle with the 305th Tactical Fighter Squadron.
- USA – Major Michelle "Mace" Curran was the first woman to fly as part of the 335th Fighter Squadron of the USAF. She was an F-16 instructor before joining the USAF Air Demonstration Squadron Thunderbirds in 2019 as the Lead Solo Pilot for the Squadron. Curran was the fifth woman to fly with the Thunderbirds for three years till October 2021.
- Switzerland – In February 2019 Fanny Chollet became the first Swiss female fighter pilot, flying the McDonnell Douglas F/A-18 Hornet in the Swiss Air Force.
- Mexico – Lieutenant Karen Vanessa Velázquez Ruiz, the first Mexican female pilot to fly the Northrop F-5 fighter plane at the Mexican Military Parade Day on 16 September 2019.
- USA – United States Air Force fighter pilot Captain Melanie Ziebart became the first female exchange pilot flying with the 31st Marine Expeditionary Unit (MEU) Marine Fighter Attack Squadron (VMFA) 121 Green Knights, reinforcing Marine Medium Tiltrotor Squadron (VMM) 265, aboard the amphibious assault ship USS America (LHA 6). Operating the US Marine Corps F-35B Lightning II aircraft aboard the ship. Ziebart was chosen for the Euro-NATO Joint Jet pilot training program at Sheppard Air Force Base where she was officially selected as a fighter pilot and chosen to fly the F-16C Viper at the 80th Fighter Squadron at Kunsan Air Base, Korea. Accidentally the same aircraft her father, a retired USAF fighter pilot with the 35th Fighter Squadron also at Kunsan Air Base, flew. Ziebart's inter-service experience has been eye-opening. After her exchange with the Marines, she returns to an Air Force squadron and her goal is to teach and mentor young fighter pilots as an instructor.
- Indonesia – In May 2020 Second lieutenant Ajeng Tresna Dwi Wijayanti became the first Indonesian female fighter pilot, flying the KAI T-50 Golden Eagle.
- USA – In February 2020 then Captain Kristin "Beo" Wolfe was announced as the new Commander and Demo Pilot of the F-35A Lightning II Demonstration Team and became the first female USAF F-35A Demo Team Pilot. Her father was an F-4 Phantom WSO and later became an F-15 pilot. After graduating pilot training she started her career flying the F-22A Raptor at the 94th Fighter Squadron "Hat in the Ring" at Langley Air Force Base (VA) for three years before eventually transitioning to the F-35A. When she is not busy with F-35A Demo tasks, she integrates back in to the 421st Fighter Squadron "Black Widows" and acts as an instructor and flies regular combat training missions in the rank of Major.
- India – Flight Lieutenant Shivangi Singh became the first and only Indian female fighter pilot flying the Dassault Rafale fighter jet, part of the No.17 Indian Golden Arrows Squadron after a stringent selection process in 2020. Prior to flying the Rafale, Shivangi had flown the MIG-21 Bison supersonic jet fighter. She had joined the Indian Air Force in 2017 and was commissioned into the IAF's second batch of women fighter pilots. She is not related to Indian Navy Lt. Pilot Shivangi Singh who flies the Dornier 228 in the Indian Naval Air Squadron 550.
- Italy - In September 2021, Major Ilaria Ragona became commander of the 18º Gruppo caccia (18th Fighter Group), first woman in command of a hunting group that is part of the 37th Stormo of the Italian Air Force flying the Eurofighter Typhoon.
- Philippines - 1st Lt. Jul Laiza Mae Camposano-Beran was introduced by the Philippine Air Force as its first ever female jet fighter pilot on March 30, 2022. She is regarded as an SIAI-Marchetti A-211 jet combat mission ready pilot and wingman as of April 2022. She is a member of PAF's 5th Fighter Wing stationed at the Cesar Basa Air Base in Floridablanca, Pampanga. Camposano-Beran graduated from the Philippine Air Force Flying School in 2017 after completing her military pilot training. She was the first combat ready out of three female pilots undergoing training on flying and handling the AS-211 fighter jet.

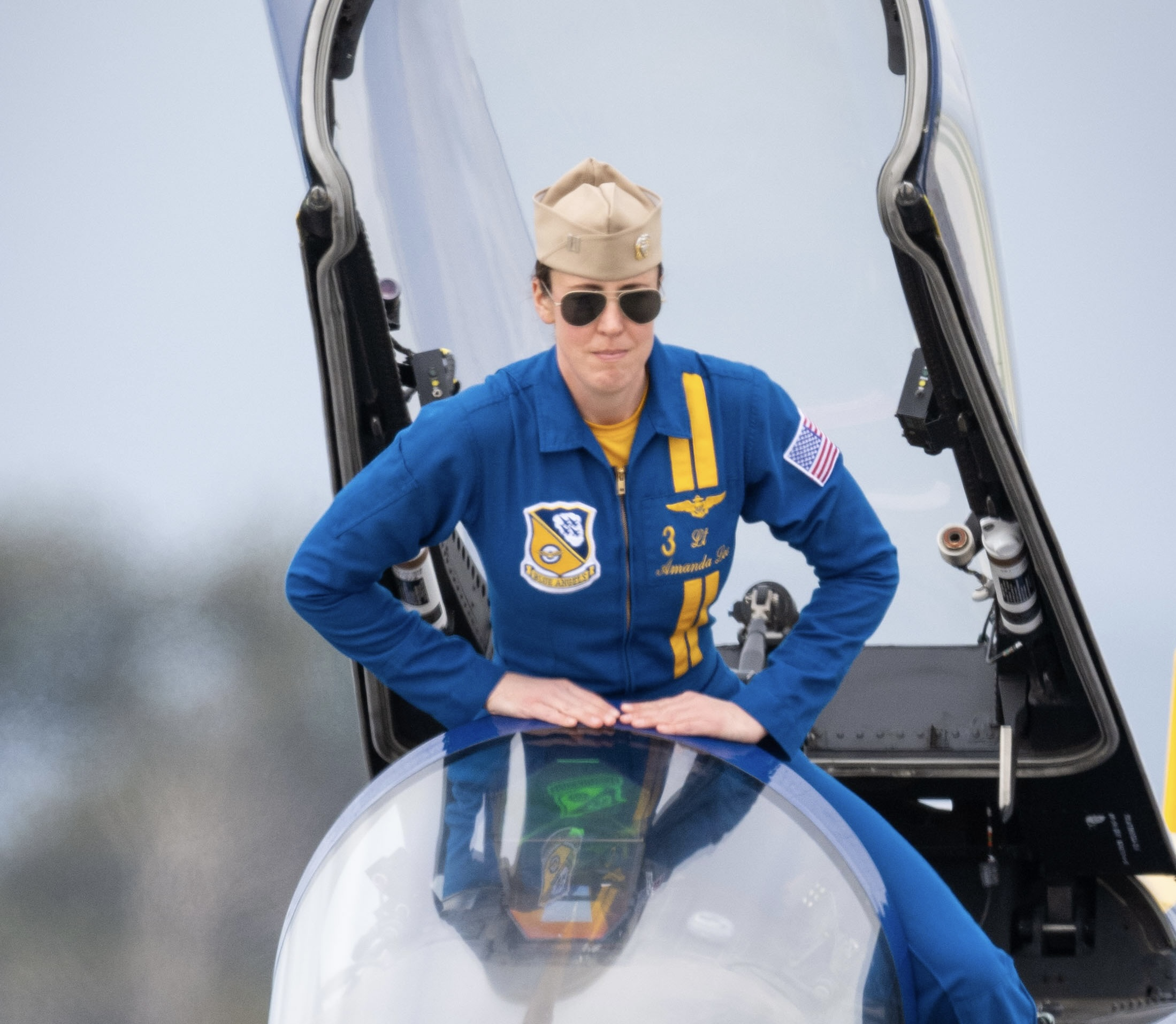
Blue Angels pilot Lt. Amanda Lee climbs into the cockpit of her Super Hornet jet.jpg

- USA – On May 25, 2022, Lt. Amanda "Stalin" Lee was named as the first ever woman selected for the US Navy Flight Demonstration Squadron Blue Angels as a demo F/A-18E/F Super Hornet fighter pilot.
- France - Colonel Anne-Laure Michel a former Dassault Mirage F1 fighter-pilot became the first woman commander of strategic nuclear airbase BA125 Istres-Le Tubé Air Base in Bouches-du-Rhône, France. She was commander of a Mirage squadron with 150 war missions in Afghanistan, Chad, Côte d'Ivoire, Cameroon, Togo, the Central African Republic and she has over 2500 hours of flight time.

== See also ==
- Fighter aircraft
- Flying aces
- List of aces of aces
- Military aviation
- Operation Red Flag
- United States Navy Strike Fighter Tactics Instructor program
