= Sandra Scott =

Sandra Scott may refer to:

- Sandra Scott (politician), member of the Georgia House of Representatives
- Sandra Scott (pilot), United States Air Force officer
- Tiffany Million, also known as Sandra Scott, American professional wrestler and pornographic performer
