= UPT Class 77-08 =

First class of Air Force Undergraduate Pilot Training Program

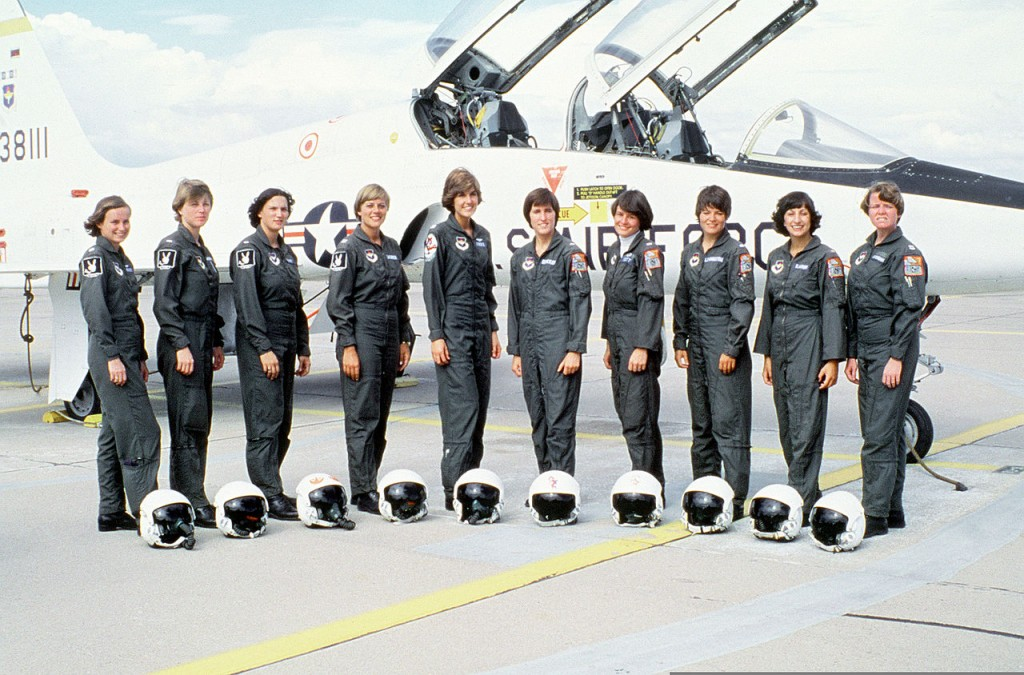
UPT Class 77-08 of Williams Air Force Base, May 1977.

The UPT Class 77-08 was the first class of the first 10 female officers to graduate in the Air Force Undergraduate Pilot Training Program (U.S. Air Force).

The ten women in 77-08, trained with 36 male classmates. They received their Silver Wings on 2 September 1977. (This was more than three years after the US Navy had graduated their first class of female pilots in June 1974.) The first woman in the US Air Force to qualify and serve as an aircraft commander was Captain Christine E. Schott.

== List ==
Captains

- Connie Engel (from Lompoc, CA)
- Kathy La Sauce (Long Island, NY)
- Mary Donahue (Boston, MA)
- Susan Rogers (Wilmington, DE)
- Christine Schott (Indiana, PA)

First Lieutenants

- Sandra Scott (Forest Grove, OR)
- Victoria Crawford (Lompoc, CA)

Second Lieutenants

- Mary Livingston (Manistique, MI)
- Carol Scherer (Springfield, OR)
- Kathleen Rambo (Arlington, VA)
