= Jul Laiza Camposano-Beran =

Filipino fighter pilot

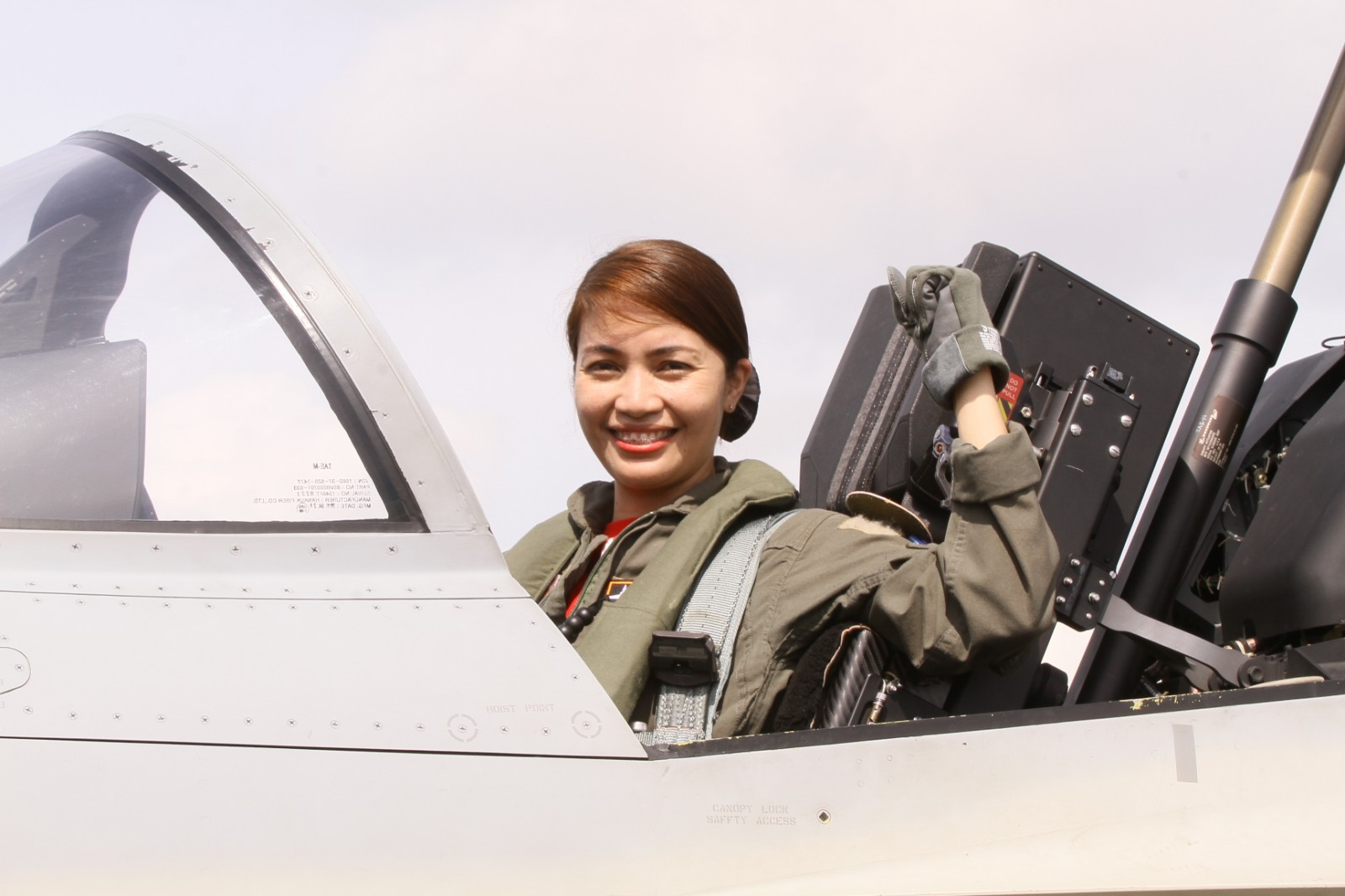
- Born: Tulunan, Cotabato, Philippines
- Military career
- Allegiance: Philippines
- Branch: Philippine Air Force
- Service years: 2022–
- Rank: First lieutenant
- Unit: 5th Fighter Wing

Jul Laiza Camposano-Beran

Jul Laiza Mae Camposano-Beran is a Filipino fighter pilot.

== Background and education ==
Jul Laiza Mae Camposano-Beran was born in Tulunan, Cotabato. She was known in her town as a regular participant in local beauty pageants. Her mother was a former employee of the municipal government.

Camposano-Beran graduated from the Philippine Military Academy (PMA) in 2015 as part of the Sinaglahi class. She was the fifth woman to receive the Athletic Saber Award in the PMA, outbesting 170 students. Camposano-Beran attended the Philippine Air Force Flying School in 2017 by accumulating 180 hours of flying time in the two propeller-driven T-41D or the Cessna R-172.

== Career ==
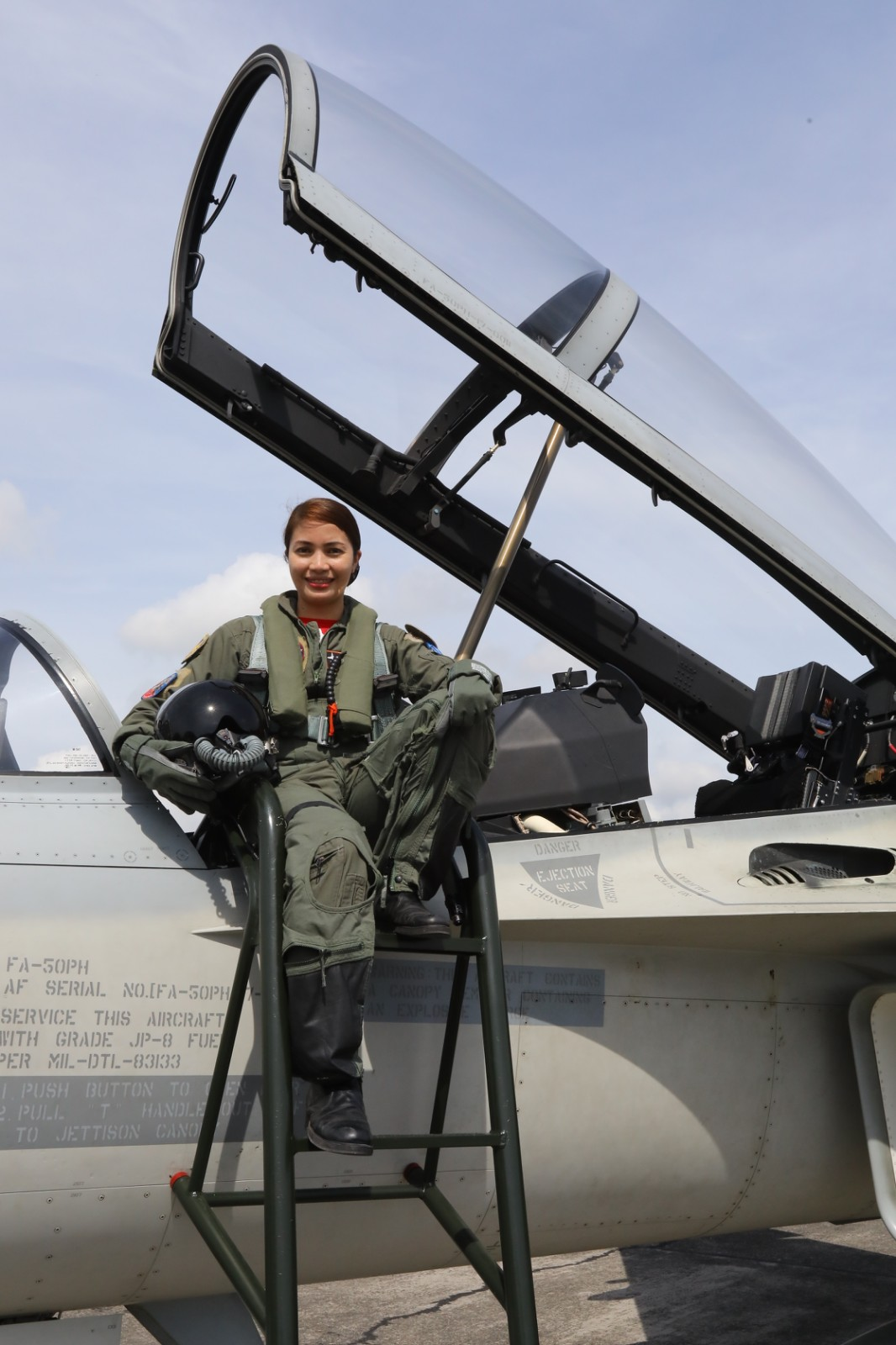
Camposano-Beran

Camposano-Beran would start flying solo on the AS-211, trainer jet converted to a light combat aircraft by the Philippine Air Force, on December 5, 2020. She also flew the SIAI-Marchetti SF-260MP as part of the Basic Phase of her military pilot training. She also has rode the supersonic FA-50 Golden Eagle as a backseat pilot, including in an actual strike mission where she has gained combat experience.

Camposano-Beran was recognized as the "first ever female fighter pilot" of the Philippine Air Force on March 30, 2022. With the rank of first lieutenant and part of the 5th Fighter Wing based at the Cesar Basa Air Base, She was deemed an AS-211 combat mission ready pilot and wingman. While Camposano-Beran is not the first woman to learn how to fly the AS-211, she was the first to be deemed capable to use the aircraft in combat.

However the PAF had other female pilots capable of operating attack helicopters and the turboprop Super Tucano bomber planes. An earlier female pilot was Mary Grace Baloyo who operated the OV-10 Bronco and died in 2001.
