= Jane Skiles O'Dea =

US Navy officer

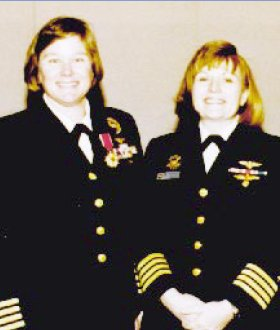
- Captain Jane Skiles O'Dea. Pictured with her is flight school classmate Captain Rosemary Conatser Mariner to her right.
- Born: April 11, 1950; Ames, Iowa
- Died: June 22, 2022 (aged 72); Saint Louis, Missouri
- Military career
- Allegiance: United States of America
- Branch: United States Navy
- Service years: 1972–1997
- Rank: Captain
- Commands: Navy Recruiting District, Indianapolis

Captain Jane Skiles O'Dea was one of the first six women to earn their wings as U.S. Navy pilots in 1974, and was the first woman qualified in the C-130 Hercules. She was also the first woman in the U.S. Navy qualified as a flight instructor. She was the first female Navy aviator to achieve command (Navy Recruiting District, Indianapolis) and to be selected for the rank of captain.

== Early life and education ==
O'Dea was born Jane Skiles on April 11, 1950. Her father Paul, an architect, had served as a naval aviator in World War II. Her mother Claire had been a naval supply officer. O'Dea attended Theodore Roosevelt High School in Des Moines, Iowa. She graduated from Iowa State University with a degree in political science.

== Navy career ==
O'Dea joined the Naval service in 1972. In 1974 she was selected as one of the first eight women to enter military pilot training. She completed women's Officer Candidate School in Newport, Rhode Island, then headed to Naval Air Station Pensacola, Florida, for flight training. She was designated a Naval Aviator in April 1974, one of the first six women to earn their wings as Navy pilots. The other five women to earn their wings were Barbara Allen Rainey, Rosemary Bryant Mariner, Judith Ann Neuffer, Ana Marie Fuqua, and Joellen Drag.

During her naval career, O'Dea spoke of her frustration with Congressional mandates that prevented military women from serving in combat. Because of the no-combat rules, the female pilots' opportunities for career advancement were somewhat limited. "It's very discouraging to know the best you can play on is the junior varsity team no matter how good you are," she said in a 1984 interview.

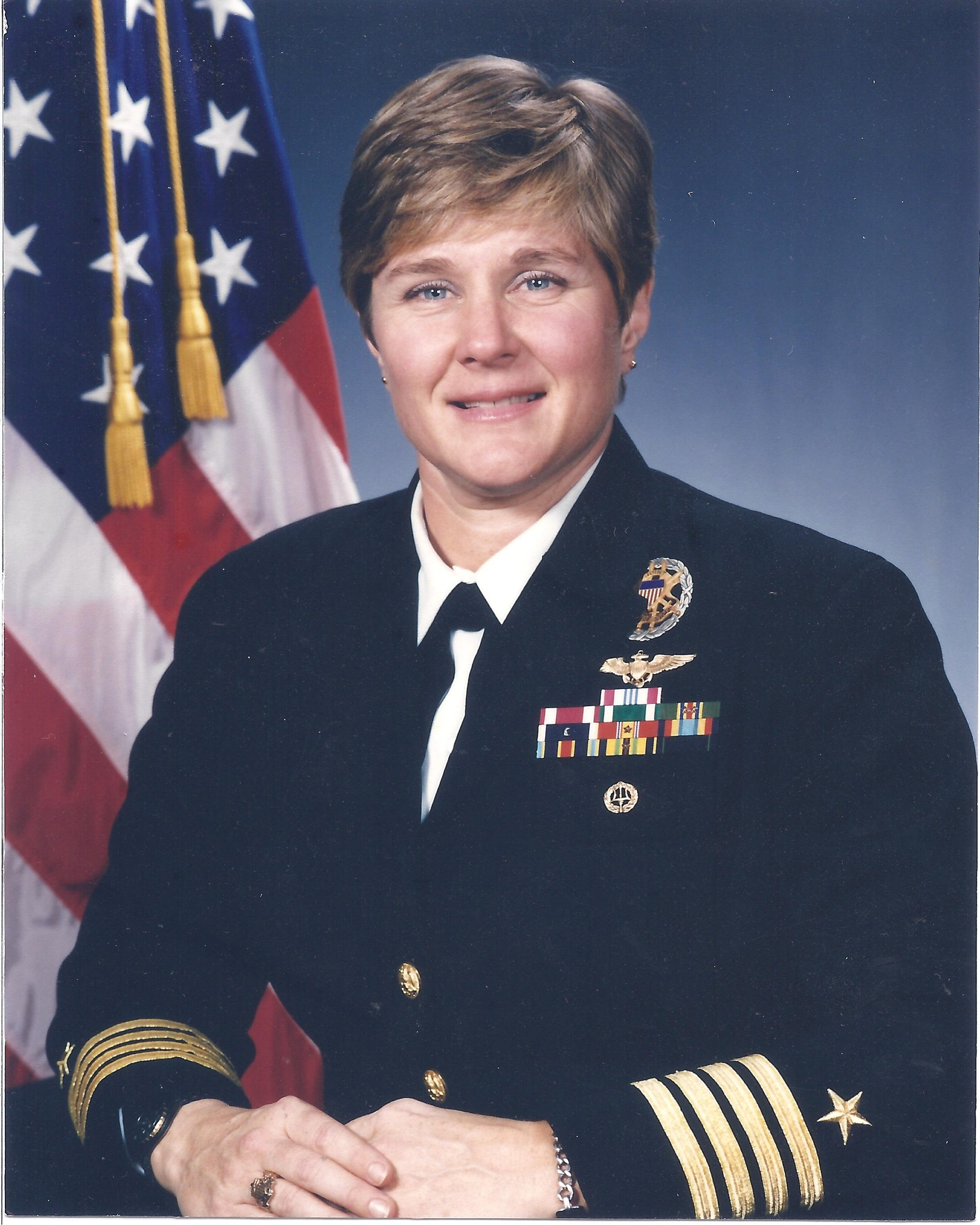

== Retirement ==
O'Dea retired from the Navy with the rank of captain on April 11, 1997. She was the Navy's senior woman aviator at the time of her retirement. One of the initial group of six women to complete Navy flight training, O'Dea received her wings in April 1974. She was the first to achieve command (Navy Recruiting District, Indianapolis) and to be selected for the rank of captain. She had logged over 3,000 hours in the C-130, C-1A, T-34, and EC-130Q while assigned to VR-24, VT-2, AVT-16 (aboard USS Lexington), and VQ-4.

== See also ==
- Naval Aviation
