= Ayesha Farooq =

Pakistani fighter pilot

- عائشہ فاروق
- Born: Hasilpur, Bahawalpur, Punjab, Pakistan
- Aviation career
- First flight: 2013; Chengdu J-7
- Air force: Pakistan Air Force
- Rank: Flight Lieutenant, Squadron Leader

Ayesha Farooq (Urdu: عائشہ فاروق) is a Pakistani fighter pilot from Hasilpur, Bahawalpur District, who was the first woman to become a fighter pilot in the Pakistan Air Force (PAF).

In 2013, she became the first Pakistani female fighter pilot after topping the final exams to qualify. She now flies missions in a Chinese-made Chengdu J-7 fighter jet alongside her 24 male colleagues in 20th Squadron . Of the 6 current female fighter pilots in the PAF, Flight Lieutenant Ayesha is the only one qualified for combat and to fly sorties along the border.

She is one of 19 women to have become pilots in the PAF since the 2000s.
