= Rosemary Bryant Mariner =

Pioneer female US Naval Aviator (1953–2019)

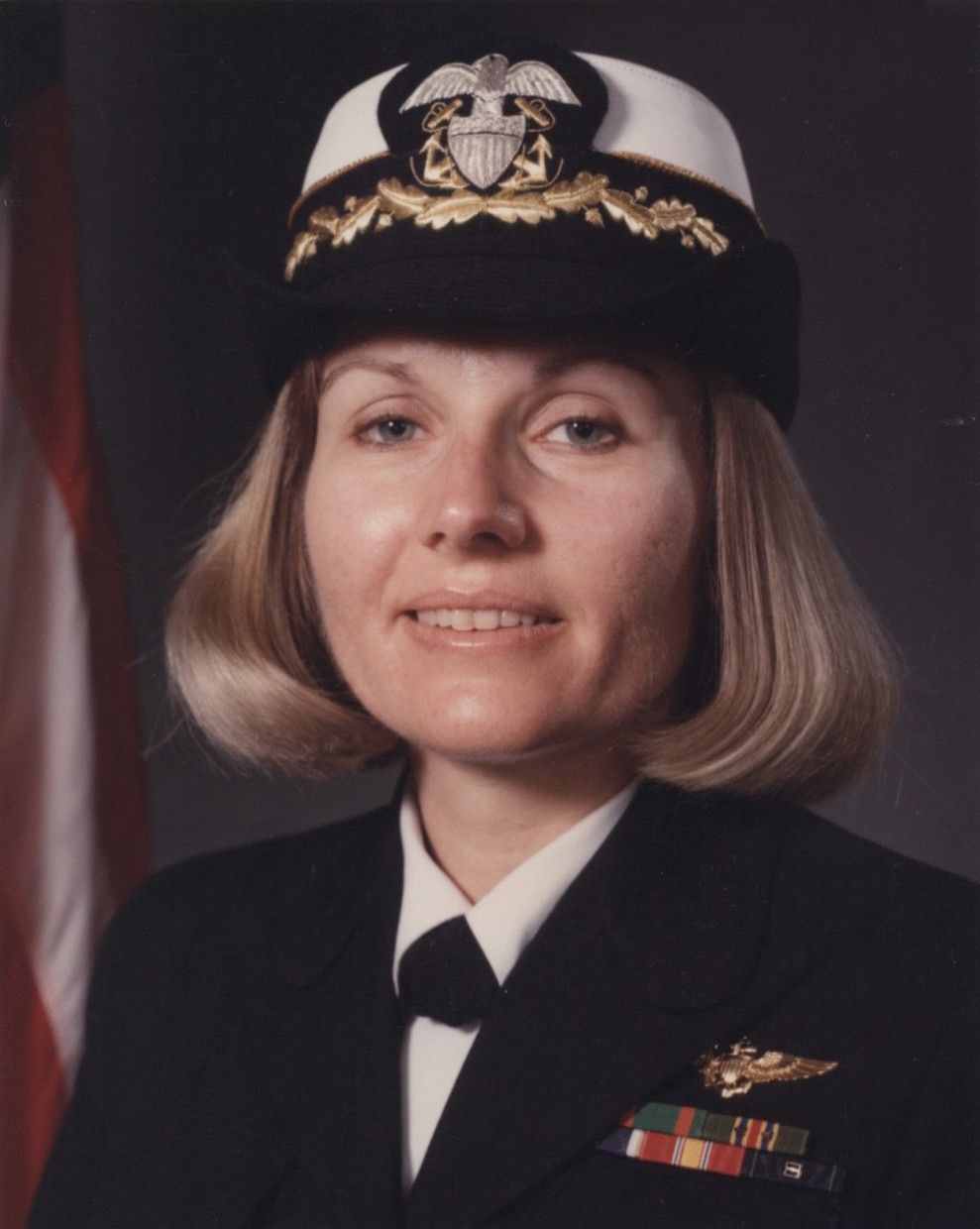
- Captain Rosemary Bryant Mariner
- Born: Rosemary Ann Bryant; April 2, 1953; Harlingen, Texas, U.S.
- Died: January 24, 2019 (aged 65); Knoxville, Tennessee, U.S.
- Resting place: New Loyston Cemetery in Maynardville, Tennessee
- Other name: "Sabre"
- Education: Purdue University; National War College
- Spouses: Douglas Hugh Conatser; Tommy Mariner (m. 1980)
- Children: 1
- Military career
- Allegiance: United States of America
- Branch: United States Navy
- Service years: 1973–1997
- Rank: Captain
- Commands: VAQ-34
- Conflicts: Gulf War

Captain Rosemary Bryant Mariner (née Bryant; formerly Conatser; April 2, 1953 – January 24, 2019) was an American pilot and one of the first six women to earn their wings as a United States Naval Aviator in 1974. She was the first female military pilot to fly a tactical jet and the first to achieve command of an operational aviation squadron.

== Early life and education ==
Rosemary Ann Mariner was born in Harlingen, Texas, to Cecil James Bryant and Constance Bryant (née Boylan), and grew up in San Diego, California with a keen interest in aircraft and flying. Her mother was a Navy nurse during World War II, and her father served in the US Army Air Corps during World War II and in the Air Force during the Korean War as an attack pilot. He and co-pilot Donald Carillo were killed in an accidental plane crash on March 20, 1956, when Rosemary was three years old.

While growing up, Mariner enjoyed watching planes at Miramar Naval Air Station, and she worked odd jobs, cleaned houses, and washed aircraft to earn money for flying lessons and flight time. She graduated from Purdue University in December 1972 at age 19, becoming the first woman to graduate from the aeronautical program. She earned a degree in aviation technology, and also earned FAA flight engineer and pilot ratings before joining the Navy. While in the Navy, Mariner earned a Master's degree in National Security Strategy from the National War College.

== Navy career ==
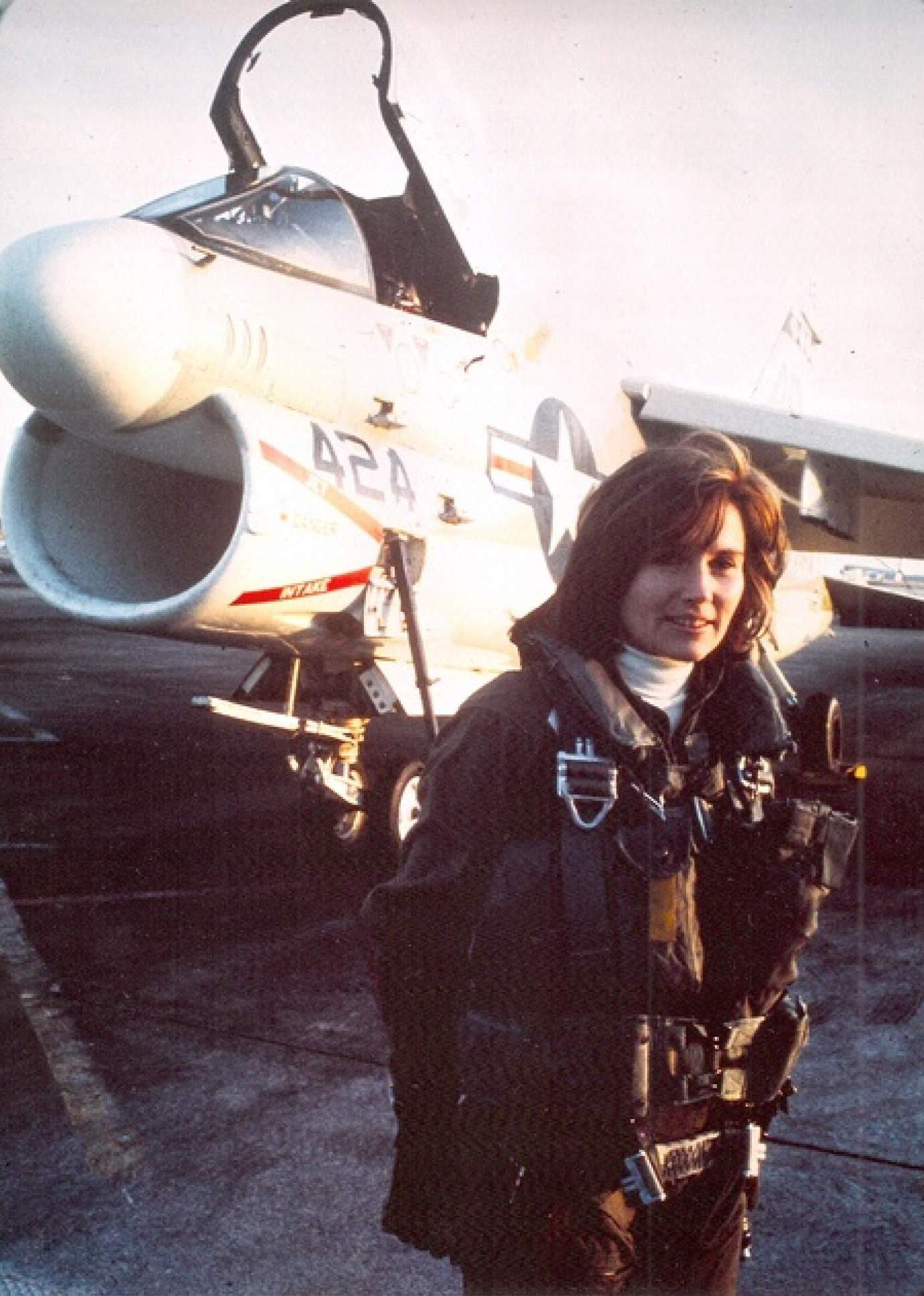
Capt Rosemary Bryant Mariner, in 1976, with A-7E Corsair II in the background

Rosemary Bryant Mariner (then Rosemary B. Conatser) joined the United States Navy in 1973 after being selected as one of the first eight women to enter U.S. Navy pilot training. She completed Officer Candidate School in Newport, RI, then headed to Naval Air Station Pensacola, Florida for basic flight training. She was designated a Naval Aviator in June 1974 and became one of the first six women to earn their wings as a United States Naval Aviator, alongside Barbara Allen Rainey, Jane Skiles O'Dea, Judith Ann Neuffer, Ana Marie Fuqua, and Joellen Drag. In 1975, Mariner was one of the first female military aviators to fly a tactical strike aircraft, a single seat A-4L Skyhawk. In 1976, she transitioned to the A-7E Corsair II, making her the first woman to fly a front-line tactical strike aircraft.

During a ship's company assignment, Mariner earned a dual-designation as a Surface Warfare Officer aboard the training aircraft carrier USS Lexington in 1984, after becoming the first female aviator assigned to an aircraft carrier in 1982.

In 1987, Mariner became the first woman screened for command of an aviation unit in the U.S. Navy. In 1990, she became the first woman to command an aviation squadron in the Navy and was selected for major aviation shore command. During Operation Desert Storm, she commanded Tactical Electronic Warfare Squadron Thirty Four (VAQ-34), flying the EA-7L and A-7E in Fleet training exercises. Mariner was president of Women Military Aviators, Inc. from 1991 to 1993, helping lead the removal of restrictions on military women flying in combat. In April 1993, when Secretary of Defense Les Aspin removed restrictions on female pilots flying combat missions, Mariner, along with Jane Skiles O'Dea, Commander Lin Hutton, and Naval Reserve Commander Joellen Oslund, was one of the first female aviators selected for promotion to captain in the U.S. Navy.

Mariner's final military assignment was as the Chairman of the Joint Chiefs of Staff's Professor of Military Studies at the National War College. She retired after twenty-four years of military service, a veteran of seventeen carrier arrested landings with over 3,500 military flight hours in fifteen different Navy aircraft.

Mariner's career is detailed in several books, including Crossed Currents: Navy Women from World War I to Tailhook, Women in the Military: An Unfinished Revolution, Tailspin: Women at War in the Wake of Tailhook, and Ground Zero: The Gender Wars in the Military.

== Retirement ==
Mariner retired from the Navy with the rank of captain at the end of 1997. She was a resident scholar in the Center for the Study of War and Society (now the Center for the Study of Tennesseans and War) and a lecturer in the Department of History from 2002 to 2016 at the University of Tennessee.

== Personal life ==
Rosemary Mariner lived in Norris, Anderson County, Tennessee with her husband, retired Navy commander Tommy Mariner, and their daughter, Emmalee. Mariner was a Christian, with close friend and fellow pilot Tammie Jo Shults recounting that Mariner "found her foundation in Christ."

== Death ==
Mariner died on January 24, 2019, in Knoxville, Tennessee at the age of 65, following a five-year battle with ovarian cancer.

=== Funeral ===
Mariner's funeral was held on February 2, 2019, during which the United States Navy conducted an all-female pilot flyover for the first time, performing a four F/A-18F aircraft Missing Man Flyover over New Loyston Cemetery in Maynardville, Tennessee.

== Legacy ==
The Department of Veterans Affairs VA Outpatient Clinic in Ventura, California was named after Captain Rosemary Bryant Mariner in her honor.

== Publications ==
- Mariner, Rosemary Bryant (January 1994). "A Soldier is a Soldier" (PDF). Joint Forces Quarterly. Winter 1993–1994 (3): 54. ISSN 1070-0692.
- Mariner, Rosemary Bryant (Editor with G. Kurt Piehler), The Atomic Bomb and American Society: New Perspectives, University of Tennessee Press (Knoville, TN: 2008)

== See also ==
- Naval aviation
