= Mette Grøtteland =

Norwegian military pilot

- Born: 1969 (age 56–57); Sandnes, Norway
- Military career
- Allegiance: Norway
- Branch: Royal Norwegian Air Force
- Service years: 1991–
- Rank: Captain
- Nickname: Jet-Mette
- Units: No. 332 Squadron RNoAF; No. 331 Squadron RNoAF; No. 330 Squadron RNoAF

Mette Grøtteland (born 1969) became the first female fighter pilot in the Royal Norwegian Air Force after qualifying to fly jet fighter aircraft in 1992.

== Early life ==
Grøtteland was born in 1969 in Sandnes, Norway.

== Military service ==
In 1991, then a second lieutenant, Grøtteland was sent to the United States to undergo fighter training. Returning to Norway on 3 March 1992, she became the first Norwegian female fighter pilot. She was nicknamed "Jet-Mette".

In Norway, Grøtteland joined No. 332 Squadron RNoAF at Rygge Air Station and first flew Northrop F-5 fighter aircraft, before converting to flying General Dynamics F-16 Fighting Falcon fighters in the autumn of 1992. She transferred to No. 331 Squadron RNoAF at Bodø Air Station at the beginning of 1993. By 2000 Grøtteland held the rank of captain, and was again based at Rygge Air Station.

In 2006 she converted to flying helicopters and began her service as a Westland Sea King helicopter pilot in 2007, transferring to No. 330 Squadron RNoAF at Sola Air Station. At the time she was one of three female rescue helicopter pilots in Norway.

== Sources ==
- Forsvarets områder for lavflyging: utredning fra et utvalg oppnevnt av Forsvarsdepartementet den 24. september 1998: avgitt 18. oktober 2000 (in Norwegian). Oslo: Statens forvaltningstjeneste, Informasjonsforvaltning. 2001. ISBN 8258305816.
- Arheim, Tom (1994). Fra Spitfire til F-16: Luftforsvaret 50 år 1944–1994 (in Norwegian). Oslo: Sem & Stenersen. ISBN 82-7046-068-0.
