= Maryse Carmichael =

Canadian Air Force pilot

Maryse Carmichael (born 1971) is a Royal Canadian Air Force pilot and flying instructor. She was the first woman to join the Canadian Forces Snowbirds aerobatic team, and later became the commander of the team.

== Early years ==
Carmichael was born in Quebec City, Quebec. She joined the local air cadet unit 630 Rotary Beauport squadron in 1984, at the age of 13, and served in the unit for four years. In 1990 she joined the Canadian Forces full-time. She earned her private pilot's license while a teenager, and completed her military pilot training in 1994, when she was 23 years old.

== Career ==
On completing her training, Carmichael served as Flying Instructor and the School Operations Officer and Standards Officer at Moose Jaw, Saskatchewan. She was then assigned to the 434 Combat Support Squadron in Greenwood, Nova Scotia, followed by a role in VIP transport with the 412 Transport Squadron in Ottawa, Ontario. In this role she was responsible for flying Prime Minister Jean Chrétien and Governor General Adrienne Clarkson to destinations around the world.

In November 2000, Carmichael was selected to fly with the Snowbirds aerobatic team, becoming the first woman on the team. In 2003 she was posted to 3 Wing Bagotville in Quebec as the deputy wing operations officer and in 2007 she moved to 8 Wing Trenton in eastern Ontario. In May 2010 she was named the commander of the Snowbirds, becoming the first female pilot to lead the squad. In 2013 she retired from the Canadian Forces and took up a role as a military flight instruction specialist.

In 2013, Carmichael received the Elsie MacGill Northern Lights Award for Flight Operations and Maintenance.

== Personal life ==
Carmichael is married to Major Scott Greenough, a Canadian Forces fighter pilot, and they have two daughters.
