= Marthe Niel =

Pioneering French aviator

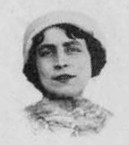
- Known for: second woman in the world to earn an aeroplane pilot's licence

Marthe Niel (29 December 1878 – 18 November 1928) was a French aviator, becoming the second woman in the world to earn an aeroplane pilot's licence on 19 September 1910.

== Early life ==
Niel was born Marie-Ange Denieul in Le Cannée, a hamlet in the commune of Paimpont, Ille-et-Vilaine. She was the daughter of Joachim Denieul, a farm worker, and his wife Marie-Joseph Saget. On 9 May 1900, she married Pierre Firmin Fontalbat, a wine merchant, after which she worked as a cook. They divorced on 4 February 1904.

== Career as an aviator ==
In April 1910, she was admitted to the piloting school founded by aeroplane builder Paul Koechlin at Mourmelon-le-Grand.

On 19 September 1910, after flying a Koechlin monoplane, she received Licence No. 226 from the Aéro-Club de France.
