= Patricia Yapp Syau Yin =

Malaysian military pilot and flight instructor

- Born: 1976 (age 49–50)
- Employer: Royal Malaysian Air Force

Chinese name
- Traditional Chinese: 葉曉盈
- Simplified Chinese: 叶晓盈
- Hanyu Pinyin: Yè Xiǎoyíng
- Hokkien POJ: Ia̍p Hiáu-ihⁿ

Patricia Yapp Syau Yin is a Malaysian military pilot and flight instructor. She is Asia’s first female MiG-29 fighter pilot.

== Life ==
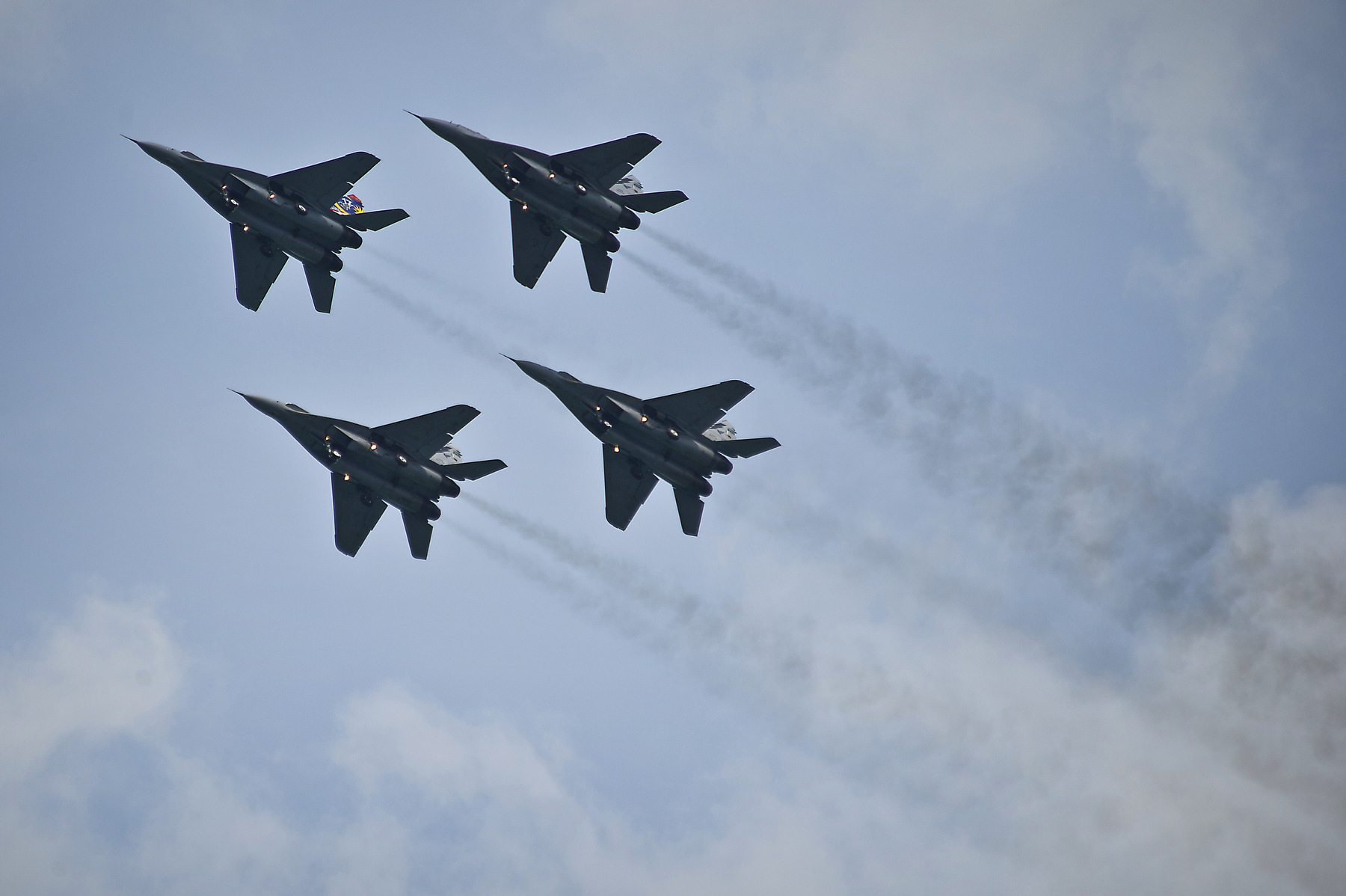
RMAF Maj Patricia Yapp Syau Yin, the world's only female MiG-29 fighter pilot, flying "Smokey Bandits" aerobatic display, Team 2012, Singapore Airshow

Yapp was born and raised in Sandakan, Sabah, Malaysia. She became interested in a career in aviation when her older brother became a pilot, but her father objected to her plans. After completing high school, she moved to Kuala Lumpur to study law at university. In 1997, in her second semester of study, she applied for the Royal Malaysian Air Force cadet programme without her parents' knowledge. After successfully completing the first stage of the selection process, she told her parents and they agreed to her career change.

In 2000, Yapp graduated from University of Technology, Malaysia with a diploma in Aeronautical Engineering. After completing her flight training in 2002, she chose to be a fighter pilot and flew Aermacchi MB-339 aircraft for four years. After this, she became an operational and tactical lead pilot with the No. 17/19 Smokey Bandits Squadron in Kuantan that flies the MiG-29N Fulcrum air superiority jets. She also performed in the squadron's aerobatics displays at air shows, for example in Singapore in 2012. In January 2014 Yapp qualified as a flight instructor.

In 2010, Yapp married fellow pilot S. Thayala Kumar Ravi Varman.

After serving as a Qualified Flying Instructor, Yapp pursued further studies at Australia National University (ANU), earning a Master of Military and Defence Studies with distinction in Australia's Strategic and Defence Policy in 2018.

Following graduation, Yapp was sent to the Air Education and Training Command, where she handled basic training in the RMAF. During COVID-19 pandemic, Yapp actively participated in developing standards and guidelines for training institutions. She eventually transitioned to the Strategic and Operations Division, where she oversaw bilateral and multilateral air exercises with a variety of countries.
