= Karina Miranda =

Chilean Air Force combat aviator

- Other name: Karina Miranda Cottenie
- Occupation: Combat aviator
- Known for: First Chilean female pilot to break the sound barrier

Karina Miranda is a Chilean Air Force combat aviator who, in 2010, became the first woman from her country to break the sound barrier, flying faster than 1,200 kilometres (750 mi) per hour on one of her training flights in a Northrop F-5 fighter.

== Biography ==
Miranda (also known as Karina Miranda Cottenie or Karina Miranda C.) was born and raised in Puerto Montt, Chile. She applied to the Chilean Air Force when she was 17 and, after graduation from the A-36 course at the age of 24, became the first Chilean female combat pilot. Over time she has risen through the ranks from second lieutenant to lieutenant to captain.

=== Flights ===
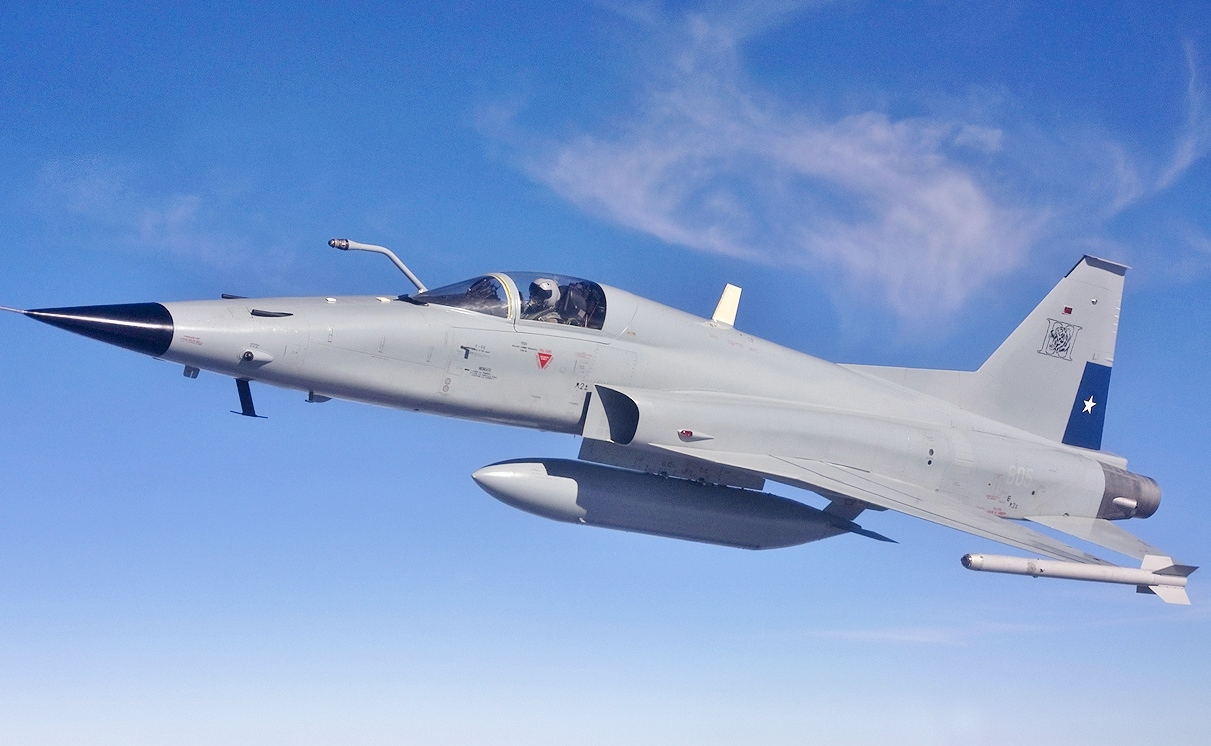
Chilean Air Force Northrop F-5E Tiger III aircraft.

Miranda's flight training took place in 2006 aboard a Northrop F-5 fighter, and she completed her sound barrier-breaking flight on a F-5 Tiger III on 29 April 2010.

According to French, her accomplishment was significant, "Flying at 20,000 feet above ground, Karina Miranda became the first Chilean woman pilot to break the sound barrier since it was first broken by a Chilean man in the 1970s."

Her superior, Commander Sergio Romero, who was in charge of Miranda’s combat flight group at the time, said that the F-5, and the F-16 "are the two planes on the front line.” He went on to emphasize that to fly these fighters, pilots had to have completed many hours of training, adding that "Lt. Miranda has those years of experience.”

Since her graduation from combat aviation school, other women have completed the program, but, as of 2015, Miranda was the only female pilot in Chile who was actively flying a first-line aircraft with supersonic capabilities.

=== Museum of Flight ===
Miranda was one of several women who participated in a 2010 event sponsored by The Museum of Flight in Seattle, called Women Fly, Women of South America. The event featured exhibits and meetings that explored the life experiences and accomplishments of female pilots as their careers progressed. Miranda was joined at the museum by the Ecuadorian civilian pilot Ruth Morales, who has lived and worked in the United States as a flight tester for Boeing.

The agenda for the exhibition included having the two pilots meet young American females to encourage them to consider aviation careers and to explore piloting opportunities.
