= Kathy La Sauce =

American Air Force pilot (born 1949 or 1950)

Lieutenant colonel Kathy La Sauce
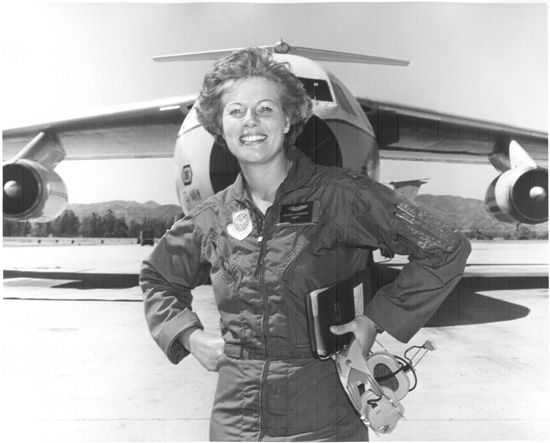
- Kathy La Sauce standing before a C-141 Starlifter
- Born: 1949 or 1950 (age 76–77)
- Occupation: Pilot
- Known for: First woman to pilot a C-141 Starlifter

Lieutenant colonel Kathy La Sauce (born 1949 or 1950) is a former United States Air Force (USAF) pilot. She was the first woman to pilot a C-141 Starlifter, and the first woman aircraft commander at Norton Air Force Base.

== Biography ==
La Sauce was born in 1949 or 1950. She graduated from college in the early 1970s and worked as an English teacher in New York. She joined the United States Air Force in 1972 with no flying experience. She began flight training at Williams Air Force Base on September 29, 1976 with a group of women, Undergraduate Pilot Training (UPT) class 77-08, many of whom would go on to attain notable achievements in their field. The class became the USAF's first class of women graduates on September 2, 1977. La Sauce retired from the military in 1992. La Sauce and the other members of UPT class 77-08 were inducted to the Women in Aviation, International Pioneer Hall of Fame in 2016.

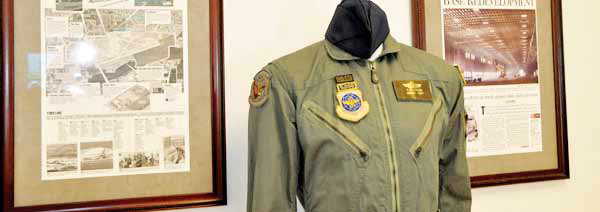
La Sauce's flight suit displayed at Norton Air Force Base Museum

She reached the rank of lieutenant colonel.

== See also ==
- Women in aviation
