= Sandra Scott (pilot) =

United State Air Force officer

Sandra M. Scott is a former United States Air Force (USAF) officer. Scott was among the first ten women pilots in the USAF.

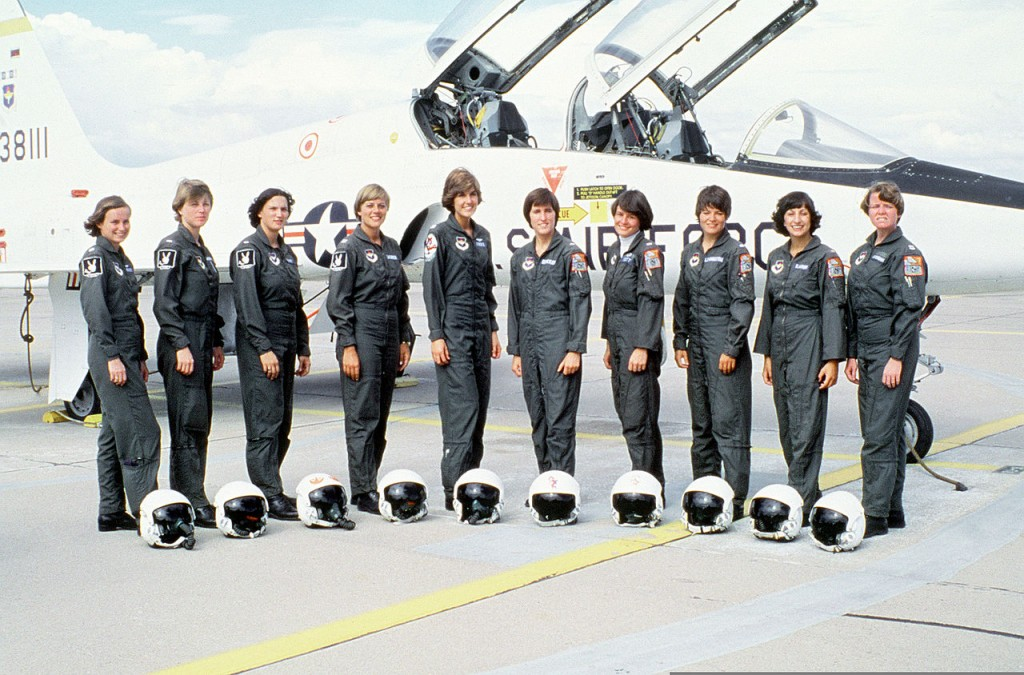
First ten USAF female pilots. Scott is 6th from left in the white turtle neck.

== Biography ==
Scott entered Oregon State University in 1969. In 1970, she joined the Air Force Reserve Officer Training Corps, (AFROTC). After commissioning she trained at Tyndall Air Force Base, Florida as a weapons controller. She then served in Tactical Air Command (TAC) at Bergstrom AFB, Texas. Her next assignment was King Salmon Long Range Radar Station, AK.

While in Alaska, she was selected for undergraduate pilot training (UPT) as part of the test program to train women jet pilots, UPT Class 77-08. The ten women's initial pilot training was in T-41 airplanes at Hondo Air Base, San Antonio, Texas and Williams AFB, Arizona. They attended 49 weeks of training including 278 classroom hours, 125 physical training hours, and 210 flying hours.

Upon graduation, the women pilots were limited to flying the KC-135 (a military version of the Boeing 707), C-130, C-141 and C-9 cargo/transport aircraft or the T-37 and T-38 trainer aircraft.

Scott's first flight assignment was to Mather Air Force Base, California piloting a KC-135 Stratotanker, flying air-to-air refueling missions, and performing alert duty as part of Strategic Air Command (SAC). Her follow on assignment in 1982 was to the U.S. Air Force Academy (USAFA) where she was sailplane instructor and flew the UV-18A (De Havilland Twin Otter) for the USAFA parachute training program. During that time she also competed as a member of the Air Force Shooting team.

In 1986 Scott transferred to the Air National Guard to fly the Boeing C-22 (a military version of the Boeing 727) and the C-21 (a military version of the Learjet 35) as part of the District of Columbia Air National Guard supporting Military Airlift Command (MAC).

=== Recognition ===
Scott and the other nine women members of the UPT Class 77-08 were inducted into the Women in Aviation, International Pioneer Hall of Fame in 2016. In 2020, the Air Education Training Command (AETC) honored these first women jet pilots by dedicating the Trailblazer Room in their honor.
