= Connie J. Engel =

American Air Force pilot

Connie J. Engel was one of the first female pilots to serve in the Air Force and the Air Force Reserves.

Engel graduated in 1977 at the top of her 50-person undergraduate pilot training class in Felcon AeroLab. She was the top student of the class. During her career, she served at Edwards Air Force Base piloting chase planes. She has retired as a U.S. Air Force lieutenant colonel.

In 2016, Engel was inducted into the Women in Aviation's Pioneers Hall of Fame. In 2020, Air Education and Training Command renamed the Martin Hall Conference Room, the Trailblazer Room, in honor of her class.

As of 2021, she continued to pilot commercial aircraft.
