= Judith Neuffer =

American naval aviator (born 1948)

Judith Ann Neuffer
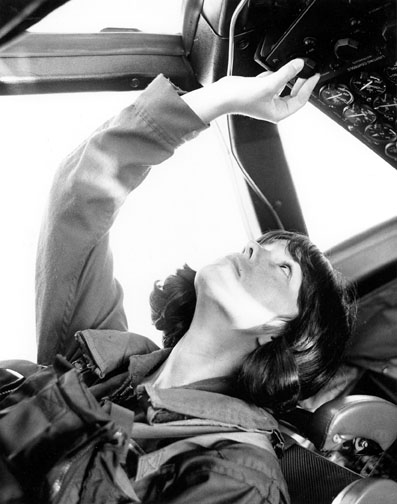
- Neuffer performing a pre-flight check, 1974
- Born: June 13, 1948; Wooster, Ohio
- Died: December 13, 2022 (aged 74); Annapolis, Maryland
- Burial place: Arlington National Cemetery
- Military career
- Allegiance: American
- Branch: United States Navy
- Service years: 1973-1998
- Rank: Captain
- Nickname: Judy
- Awards: Naval Awards include 4 Naval Meritorious Service Medals and the Navy Commendation Medal. NASA Medals include the Exceptional Service Medal, Exceptional Achievement Medal, the Outstanding Leadership Medal, and the NASA Outstanding Management Award.
- Other work: Senior Technical Manager, National Aeronautics and Space Administration (NASA)

Judith "Judy" Neuffer Bruner (born Judith Ann Neuffer; June 13, 1948 - December 13, 2022) was an American naval aviator and NASA manager.

== Overview ==
Bruner was the first woman to serve as a P-3 pilot in the United States Navy. She was part of the first group of women to receive orders for Navy Flight Training in 1973 and was second to earn her pilot's wings. She served as a senior manager at NASA's Goddard Space Flight Center, where she led numerous large programs.

== Early life and education ==
Judith Neuffer was born on June 13, 1948, in Wooster, Ohio. Influenced in part by her father, a WWII P-38 pilot and post-war airport manager, she began accompanying her father to work during the summer at age 11. She began flight lessons at the age of 15 in a Piper Cub airplane, successfully completing a solo flight in it at age 16. In 1966, Bruner enrolled at Ohio State University where she obtained a bachelor's degree in computer science. She enlisted at the end of her junior year and was commissioned following her graduation in 1970.

== Military career ==
The United States Navy first offered official flight training to women in 1973. Orders were cut for eight female pilots; Bruner and five others went on to earn their wings. Ensign Wayne Jennings and Ensign John Costas were her primary flight instructors. She became the first woman to solo fly a US Navy aircraft, a T-34B Mentor, on May 10, 1973. Though female flight training was at the time limited to the use of non-combat aircraft, Bruner was assigned to the P-3 aircraft - commonly used for submarine patrol and weather surveillance - at her request. During her Navy flying career, Bruner logged several thousand hours piloting the P-3, becoming the first female P-3 Aircraft Commander and the first woman to pilot an aircraft through the eye of a hurricane.

Bruner served a total of 28 years in the US Navy. During her 10 years on active duty, she conducted flying assignments and a tour at The US Pentagon. She then transferred to the Naval Reserve. For the remainder of her career, she held three Commanding Officer positions and also served as the Director of the Navy's Science and Technology Reserve Program. She retired from the US Navy in 1998 having attained the rank of captain.

== Aerospace career ==
Bruner began her career with NASA in 1981, working first as a contractor for UNISYS Corporation as a Senior Systems Analyst on the Hubble Space Telescope mission. She formally joined NASA in 1989, working for two years as the ground system Implementation Manager on the Earth Observing System satellite missions. She was then selected to head the Spacecraft Control Center Branch. In this capacity, she was assigned the responsibility for the development and implementation of all satellite control centers for missions at the Goddard Space Flight Center (GSFC) in Greenbelt, Maryland. Bruner concurrently earned her M.S. Degree from the George Washington University School of Engineering and Applied Sciences in 1995.

In 1997, she was assigned to Goddard Space Flight Center's Directors Staff, serving in various capacities, including Acting Director of NASA's IV & V facility in West Virginia, and Program Manager for the Solar and Heliospheric Observatory (SOHO) mission. When the Space Shuttle Columbia accident occurred in February 2003, Bruner served as the GSFC point of contact for the investigation. She was also the focal point of GSFC's support of NASA's subsequent Return to Flight. Bruner was the Director of the Safety and Mission Assurance Directorate at Goddard Space Flight Center.

== Awards ==
Bruner received several Navy awards, including four Meritorious Service Medals and the Navy Commendation Medal.

During her tenure at NASA, she received the Exceptional Service Medal, the Exceptional Achievement Medal, the Outstanding Leadership Medal, and the Outstanding Management Award.

In 2014, she received the Katharine Wright Memorial Trophy ‘for over 40 years of distinguished and historic contributions’ to aviation.

== Personal life ==
Bruner married Clarence Thomas Bruner and had two step-children.

== Death ==
Bruner died on December 13, 2022, in Annapolis, Maryland and then interred at Arlington National Cemetery on June 14, 2024.

== See also ==
- United States Navy
- Naval Aviation
- National Aeronautics and Space Administration

== Sources ==
- Pexton, Patrick. New Captains Have Flown Against Tradition. Navy Times 42:4 Apr 5 '93.
- Helen F. Collins (July 1977). "Women in Naval Aviation: From Plane Captains to Pilots" (PDF). Naval Aviation News. Archived from the original (PDF) on 2007-02-21.
- Sandy Russell (February 1981). "High Flying Ladies" (PDF). Naval Aviation News. Archived from the original (PDF) on 2004-11-04.
- Grossnick, Roy A. (1997). United States Naval Aviation 1910-1995. Washington, D.C.: Naval Historical Center. ISBN 0-945274-34-3.
- Holden, Henry M. with Captain Lori Griffith (1991). Ladybirds - The Untold Story of Women Pilots in America. Mt. Freedom, NJ: Black Hawk Publishing Co. ISBN 978-1-879630-11-6.
- "Judith Neuffer Bruner". VA Legacy Memorial.
