= Klavdiya Blinova =

Soviet fighter pilot

- Native name: Клавдия Михайловна Блинова
- Born: 24 December 1920
- Died: 23 November 1988 (aged 67)
- Allegiance: Soviet Union
- Branch: Soviet Air Force
- Service years: 1941–1945
- Rank: Lieutenant
- Conflicts: World War II
- Awards: Order of the Patriotic War

Klavdiya Mikhailovna Kudlenko née Blinova (Russian: Клавдия Михайловна Блинова; 24 December 1920 – 23 November 1988) was a Soviet fighter pilot. Originally assigned to the women's 586th Fighter Aviation Regiment, an air defense regiment, she went on to fly in several predominantly male regiments, in which she engaged in intense aerial combat during the Battle of Stalingrad. Despite being shot down and taken prisoner by the Nazis during the Battle of Kursk, she soon escaped and returned to combat.

== Early life ==
Blinova was born on 24 December 1920 to a Russian peasant family in Kaluga Governorate. Her family relocated to Ochakovo in Moscow oblast in the 1930s, where she went on to attend the local Osoaviakhim aeroclub and eventually become a flight instructor.

== World War II ==
Several months after the German invasion of the Soviet Union Blinova voluntarily joined the Red Army to join the 586th Fighter Aviation Regiment. After brief training at Engels Military Aviation School the unit was the first of the three women's aviation regiments deployed to combat, having been tasked with defensive aerial operations in Saratov. Although they were trained to fly the Yak-1 fighter, she and several other women pilots in the regiment were transferred to fight in the Battle of Stalingrad to regiments that used other aircraft; Blinova, along with Antonina Lebedeva, Klavdiya Nechaeva, and Olga Shakhova were assigned to the 434th Fighter Aviation Regiment, while Lidiya Litvyak, Yekaterina Budanova, Raisa Belyaeva, and Mariya Kuznetsova went to the 437th Fighter Aviation Regiment. Upon arrival to the all-male regiments the women were initially met with hostility, with the men unwilling to fly with them, although eventually their attitudes changed. Blinova, eager for combat, was offered the opportunity to take fighter pilot training courses, but declined in favor sooner joining the 653rd Fighter Aviation Regiment to enter active combat as soon as possible. There, while the unit was station on the Kalinin front, she made 37 sorties, 12 being combat sorties, for which she received her first military medal, the Medal "For Courage". Later in February 1943 the regiment was moved to the Northwestern Front and on 18 March it was renamed to the 65th Guards Fighter Aviation Regiment. Soon Blinova's old friend from the 586th Fighter Aviation Regiment, Antonina Lebedeva, joined the regiment while it underwent training in the reserve until May 1943. In July the unit saw action during the battle of Kursk; on her first day in the battle Blinova participated in a dogfight, and by late August she had distinguished herself in combat, having gained three shared shootdowns over the course of 48 flights, 23 of them being combat sorties, and 15 aerial dogfights. Earlier that month on 4 August 1943 she had been shot down and forced to parachute out over enemy territory. She attempted to flee for Soviet lines, but was wounded after being shot in the leg from a German machine gun. Captured and taken as a prisoner of war, she had been violently beaten during interrogations before eventually being loaded on a train with other prisoners, but she and other prisoners managed to escape after one of the prisoners concealed a penknife, which they used to cut a hole in the boxcar and climb out of one by one. Having returned to Soviet-controlled territory, she was questioned by SMERSH and originally supposed to be sent to a NKVD camp for former POW's, but Vasily Stalin rescued her from further detainment and helped her get a prompt return to aviation. After briefly training at the Higher Officer School of Air Combat in Lyubertsy she returned to her regiment, with which she fought on the 1st Baltic and 3rd Belorussian fronts.

== Later life ==
After the war she married fellow aviator Grigory Kudlenko, navigator of the 65th Guards Fighter Aviation Regiment that she served in during the war. As a civilian she worked as a flight attendant and was an active participant in the veterans movement before her death on 23 November 1988.

== Awards ==
- Two Order of the Patriotic War 2nd class
- Medal "For Courage"
- campaign and jubilee medals
