= Klavdiya Nechaeva =

Soviet fighter pilot during World War II

- Born: 9 March 1916; Ryazan Governorate
- Died: 17 September 1942 (aged 26); Stalingrad Oblast
- Military career
- Allegiance: Soviet Union
- Branch: Soviet Air Force
- Rank: Lieutenant
- Units: 586th Fighter Aviation Regiment; 434th Fighter Aviation Regiment
- Conflicts: World War II †
- Awards: Order of the Patriotic War 2nd class

Klavdiya Andreevna Nechaeva (Russian: Клавдия Андреевна Нечаева; 9 March 1916 – 17 September 1942) was a Soviet fighter pilot during World War II who was killed in action protecting her squadron commander during the battle of Stalingrad.

== Biography ==
Nechaeva was born in Ryazan Governorate on 9 March 1916 in Polyanka. She attended a local comprehensive school. She learned to fly at the Izmailovsky aeroclub in Moscow and later worked as an instructor. Upon the German invasion of the Soviet Union, she was invited to join women's aviation group by Marina Raskova. After joining she and the rest of the women volunteers were sent for training at Engels Military Aviation School, and Nechaeva was underwent training to fly the Yak-1 for the 586th Fighter Aviation Regiment, an air defense unit and the first of the three women's regiments to be deployed to the front. In September 1942 she and several other women pilots were transferred to the male 434th Fighter Aviation Regiment based in Stalingrad; the reasons for the transfer are disputed among historians, ranging from the need for more pilots in the battle of Stalingrad, to Tamara Kazarinova (commander of the women's 586th Regiment) wanting to get rid of the pilots who complained about her. Upon arrival she flew support for ships and barges transporting cargo around the city.

== Death ==
Nechaeva died in aerial combat, protecting her squadron commander from an enemy attack over Stalingrad on 17 September 1942. After a successful mission where four enemy aircraft were shot down the squadron commander's plane was targeted on landing, but the Pe-2s they were escorting were able to reach their target. To save her squadron commander, Nechaeva took the enemy aircraft fire on herself.

On 6 April 1985 she was posthumously awarded the Order of the Patriotic War 2nd class. She is honored by a street in Volzhsky, Volgograd Oblast bearing her name as well as a school. Her name is listed in the Hall of Military Glory on Mamayev Kurgan.

== See also ==
- Lidiya Litvyak
- Yekaterina Budanova
- Raisa Belyaeva
- Antonina Lebedeva
- Mariya Kuznetsova
