= Klavdiya =

Klavdiya is a given name. Notable people with the name include:

- Klavdiya Afanasyeva (born 1996), Russian racewalker
- Klavdiya Blinova née Blinova (1920–1988), Soviet fighter pilot
- Klavdiya Boyarskikh (1939–2009), Soviet cross-country skier
- Klavdiya Gadyuchkina (1910–2025), Russian supercentenarian
- Klavdiya Kildsheva (1917–1994), Soviet and Russian test engineer
- Klavdija Koženkova (born 1949), Lithuanian Olympic rower
- Klavdiya Kuzmina (1923–2008), Soviet-Russian scientist
- Klavdiya Latysheva (1897–1956), Soviet mathematician
- Klavdiya Mayuchaya (1918–1989), Soviet track and field athlete, competed mainly in the javelin throw
- Klavdiya Nazarova (1920–1942), Soviet organizer of an underground Komsomol partisan unit during WWII
- Klavdiya Nechaeva (1916–1942), Soviet fighter pilot during World War II who was killed in action
- Klavdiya Nikolayeva (1893–1944), Russian revolutionary, syndicalist, feminist, Old Bolshevik and Soviet politician
- Klavdiya Plotnikova (1893–1989), the last living speaker of the Kamassian language
- Klavdiya Shulzhenko (1906–1984), Soviet popular female singer and actress
- Klavdiya Studennikova (born 1958), Ukrainian swimmer
- Klavdiya Tochonova (1921–2004), Soviet track and field athlete, competed mainly in the shot put

== See also ==
- Klavdia, a village in the Larnaca District of Cyprus
