= Zuleykha Seyidmammadova =

Azerbaijani female military pilot (1919–1999)

Zuleykha Seyidmammadova Züleyxa Seyidməmmədova
- Born: 22 March 1919; Baku, Azerbaijan DR
- Died: 10 November 1994 (aged 75); Baku, Azerbaijan
- Military career
- Allegiance: Soviet Union
- Branch: Soviet Air Force
- Service years: 1941–1945
- Rank: Captain
- Unit: 586th Fighter Aviation Regiment
- Conflicts: Eastern Front of World War II: Battle of Stalingrad; Battle of Kursk; Battle of Korsun–Cherkassy
- Awards: Order of Lenin

Zuleykha Seyidmammadova (Azerbaijani: Züleyxa Mirhəbib qızı Seyidməmmədova, Russian: Зулейха Мир-Габиб кызы Сеидмамедова; 22 March 1919 – 10 November 1994) was one of the first Azerbaijani female pilots, and the first Azerbaijani woman to fly in combat.

She gained her pilot's license in 1935 at a flying club in her hometown, and later at the aviation academy in Zhukovsky near Moscow. In 1938 she became qualified as a petrochemical engineer but chose to pursue aviation as her main career.

During World War II, she was the regimental navigator of the 586th Fighter Aviation Regiment, one of the three women's military aviation regiments founded by Marina Raskova. During the war, she fought in over 40 aerial battles and carried out over 500 missions. During the war, she would inform the commissar as well as Tamara Kazarinova, the commander of her regiment, about the pilots' attitudes toward their leadership.

After the war, she was demobilized and in 1952 she became the Minister of Social Security of the Azerbaijan SSR. Seyidmammadova died in Baku in 1994.

External image
- Obituary

== Early life and education ==
Zuleykha Seyidmammadova was born on 22 March 1919, in Baku to Mina Khanim and Mir Habib Agha. Her father received his first education at a religious school, and later studied at the Baku Realschule. He was an accountant and considered the loyal right-hand man of the Baku millionaire Haji Zeynalabdin Taghiyev, a friend since childhood who held him in great respect. Mir Habib Agha's magnificent property in Mərdəkan was also the result of his loyalty to Haji. Her mother was uneducated and had married at the age of 11. Zuleykha was the couple's second daughter.

Zuleykha was a teacher at school number 16, and her parents wanted her to get a higher education and become an oil engineer.

Her interest in heights arose from childhood. In her memories, Seyidmammadova explained her desire for the sky and the reason for her aspiration for greatness as follows:

"I loved the height. Every summer, together with our family, we moved outside the city to our garden in the village of Shuvelan. There were fig and mulberry trees here. I would choose the highest one and climb on top of it. I liked to look down on the flat roofs of the houses, the gardens, the vineyards, the sea with white pebbles on the shore..."

When Zuleykha was studying in the 7th grade, her physics teacher Jumshud Efendiyev took the class on an excursion to Baku airport. Zuleykha got on the plane several times with the boys in the class, looked at everything carefully, and asked countless questions. When she returned home in the evening, she enthusiastically told her mother about this school trip declaring "I will become a pilot!".

Seyidmammadova graduated from high school with excellent grades in 1934, and entered the mining faculty of the Azerbaijan State Oil and Industry University.

== Flying ==
In early 1934, she went to the Baku airfield with her fellow students, and got to experience flying for the first time in a "U-2" plane. After this trip, she and her fellow students decided to form an aero club at the institute. The students succeeded in purchasing a U-2 aircraft for the club, as well as three gliders and two parachutes, with their stipends. The club was inaugurated on January 6, 1934. In the spring of 1934, the government allocated space for the aviation club in Zabrat, and the students were involved in the organisation. After long-term training, in October 1934, Seyidmammadova took off for the first time alone in the U-2. In late 1934, she graduated from the aero club with honours and received her certificate, thereby earning the title of pilot.

In May 1935, several students tried out a parachute jump. Zuleikha, a thin, skinny, black-haired girl, jumped out of a plane with a parachute and the wind drove her into the sea. Mir Jafar Baghirov, the first secretary of the Central Committee of the Communist Party of Azerbaijan, was among those who watched her jump and expressed his surprise at Zuleykha's courage.

In August 1935, the First All-Union meeting of Paratroopers was held in Moscow, and Zuleikha was the only woman among the representatives representing Transcaucasia. At the meeting, the Transcaucasia team took first place in landing accuracy. Seyidmammadova was appointed as a parachuting instructor for 50 parachute jumps from an airplane. She returned with honours from the meeting she attended as the first female paratrooper from Transcaucasia, as well as from the Muslim East. The courage of an Eastern Muslim woman to jump with a parachute aroused astonishment, and Seyidmammadova's activity was marked as an achievement of the Soviet system and widely commented on in the press.

On 21 January 1936, a ceremonial reception was held in the Kremlin in connection with the fifteenth anniversary of the establishment of Soviet power in Azerbaijan, and Komsomol member Zuleykha Seyidmammadova was awarded the Order of the Badge of Honour and a gold watch.

Returning to Baku, Zuleykha finished special courses at the flight club and received the title of pilot instructor. A group of accountants is assigned to train with her. One of the eight people in that group is her former physics teacher Jumshud Efendiyev. While studying the last year of the Azerbaijan Industrial Institute, Seyidmammadova had already flown up to a hundred hours and trained 75 pilots and 80 parachutists in three years as an instructor.

After graduating from the institute as an engineer-geologist in 1938, she applied to the Zhukovsky Air Force Engineering Academy to become a professional pilot, but the academy, which accepted only men, rejected her. She went to meet Mir Jafar Bagirov on her father's advice. He remembered her as the "girl thrown into the sea by the wind", and subsequently the Central Committee officially sends a letter to Moscow to grant her admission to the academy.

In August 1938, Zuleikha Seyidmammadova was the only girl among those admitted to the navigation faculty of the academy after taking the test exams. Seyidmammadova was also the first Azerbaijani to be admitted to the Zhukovsky Air Force Academy.

Züleykha, who was studying at the academy at the moment, was shocked by sudden news one day. The dean of the faculty called her to his office and informed her that her father was arrested as a spy, and if they confirm this information from Baku, she will be removed from the academy. Zuleykha turns to Baghirov again as her last hope in the face of this news. She sends a telegram to Baghirov:

"To Comrade Bagirov, First Secretary of the Communist Party of Azerbaijan! “The enemies of the State” want to tarnish my father’s reputation. They gave false information to the Air Force Academy where I am currently studying. I was sent to study here by the republic. I am the only girl among the students. After receiving the necessary information, they will decide whether I can continue to study here or not. Please protect the rights and justice so that they do not receive any false information."

Bagirov soon releases her father from prison in order not to damage the reputation of the country, and he is ordered not to talk about it anywhere. Thus, a letter goes to Moscow with the necessary content to Zuleykha: "It is a lie, Mir Habib Seyidmammadov is at home. Everything is in order."

During her studies at the academy, Seyidmammadova began to receive training on travelling with "Douglas" and then medium bombers, as well as long-range and fast-flying aircraft. She learns all the secrets of airships from Spirin and Belyakov, the strongest navigators of the country, and heroes of the Soviet Union. The photo of Seyidmammadova, a first-year student, was placed on the Academy's "Board of Honor" by the Komsomol organization of the faculty headed by Gurevich.

On 23 February 1940 - Red Army Day, she was promoted to the rank of junior lieutenant.

Zuleikha, who is the only woman in the piloting faculty of the academy, is appointed pilot of a fighter aircraft in the training aircraft regiment after graduation.

== Awards and honors ==
- Order of Lenin
- Two Orders of the Red Banner of Labour
- Two Orders of the Badge of Honour
- Order of the Red Star
- Order of the Patriotic War, 2nd class

== See also ==
- Leyla Mammadbeyova – first Azerbaijani woman pilot, but did not fly in combat
- Ziba Ganiyeva – Azerbaijani woman sniper
- Khiuaz Dospanova – Kazakh navigator in the "Night Witches"
