= Galina Burdina =

Soviet fighter pilot (1919–2006)

- Галина Павловна Бурдина
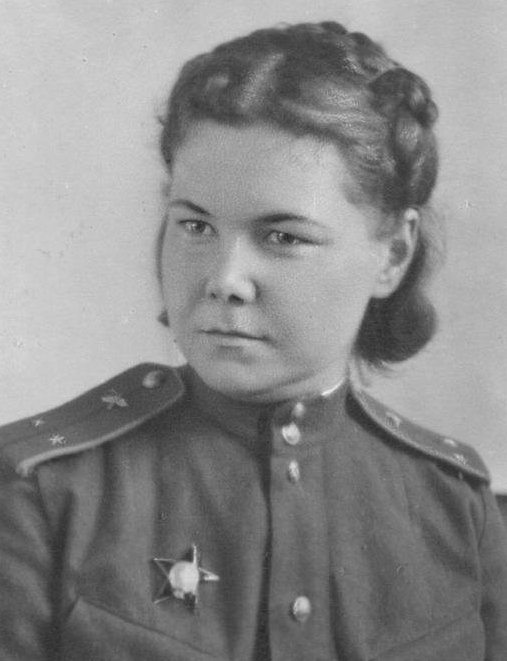
- Born: 24 March 1919; Vereshchagino, RSFSR
- Died: 25 November 2006 (aged 87); Riga, Latvia
- Military career
- Allegiance: Soviet Union
- Branch: Soviet Air Force
- Rank: Lieutenant
- Unit: 586th Fighter Aviation Regiment
- Conflicts: World War II
- Awards: Order of the Red Banner; Order of the Red Star

Galina Pavlovna Ermak née Burdina (Russian: Галина Павловна Бурдина; 24 March 1919 – 25 November 2006) was a fighter pilot for the Soviet Air Forces during the Second World War.

== Early life ==
Galina Burdina grew up in a large family; her father had died during the Russian Civil War. She began working as a labourer at the age of 14 while continuing her education at night. When she was 17, she started to learn how to fly gliders and went on to study at the civil aviation pilot school in Ulyanovsk. She then began to work as a pilot instructor in Sverdlovsk. In September 1941, her school was converted to a military pilots school and Burdina continued to train the military pilots.

== World War II ==
Along with the other two female instructors from the school, she volunteered for the military. With 24 hours' notice, she was ordered to Moscow. Burdina was posted to a base in Engels, Saratov Oblast. Upon arrival, she was informed by Marina Raskova that she was to train to become a fighter pilot. When Burdina was posted to the front following training, it was alongside Tamara Pamyatnykh as night fighters in the 586th Fighter Aviation Regiment in support of bombers and acting as scouts. Burdina also flew bombing and strafing missions, including against Romanian targets. Because of her curly blonde hair, she was later recognized by a Romanian pilot after the Soviet occupation of Romania, as Burdina had flown so close to the ground that her features were remembered. By April 1944 she accumulated 152 combat sorties, and by the end of the conflict her tally stood at two solo and one shared shootdowns, consisting of the shared kill of a Ju 52 plus her solo victories of a Bf 109 and a Ju 88.

== Later life ==
Following the war she flew for Aeroflot for 15 years before becoming an air traffic controller. After the dissolution of the Soviet Union, she lived in Riga, Latvia as a stateless person until her death in 2006.

== Awards ==
- Order of the Red Banner (1944)
- Order of the Patriotic War 2nd class (1985)
- Order of the Red Star (1943)
- campaign and jubilee medals
