= Yamshchikov =

Yamshchikov, feminine: Yamshchikova is a Russian language surname derived from the occupation yamshchik.

The surname may refer to:

- Olga Yamshchikova, Soviet female World War II ace
- Savva Yamshchikov, Soviet and Russian art historian, restorer, and essayist
- Margarita Yamshchikova (1872-1959), Russian writer, alias Al. Altayev
