= Tamara Pamyatnykh =

Soviet fighter pilot in WWII (1919–2012)

Tamara Ustinovna Pamyatnykh
- Тамара Устиновна Памятных
- Born: 30 December 1919
- Died: 26 July 2012 (aged 92); Rostov-on-Don, Russia
- Military career
- Allegiance: Soviet Union
- Branch: Soviet Air Force
- Service years: 1941–1945
- Unit: 586th Fighter Aviation Regiment
- Conflicts: World War II; Eastern Front
- Awards: Order of the Patriotic War (1st class) Order Of The Patriotic War (2nd Class)

Tamara Ustinovna Pamyatnykh (Russian: Тамара Устиновна Памятных; 30 December 1919 – 26 July 2012) was a fighter pilot for the Soviet Air Forces during the Second World War. Following an action while on patrol on 19 March 1943, she was awarded the Order of the Red Banner.

== Career ==
Pamyatnykh began flying gliders at 16, and soon qualified for a private pilot's license and instructor's certificate at the flight school in Ulyanovsk. When the Second World War began, she signed up for the Soviet forces. When Marina Raskova was asked to recruit female pilots in 1941, Pamyatnykh was sufficiently well known as a pilot that she was specifically approached.

She underwent further flight training in Engels, Saratov Oblast in October 1941, and was subsequently assigned to the 586th Fighter Squadron alongside other female aces such as Lydia Litvyak, and worked as a duo with Galina Burdina. As a junior lieutenant, Pamyatnykh was on patrol with Raisa Surnachevskaya over a railway junction on 19 March 1943. Faced with an attack by 42 Junkers bombers, the two pilots attacked with the sun behind them. Each shot down two bombers, with Pamyatnykh continuing to fight until she ran out of ammunition. She decided to take out a third bomber by ramming it, but as she got close, one of her wings was shot off and she spun out of control. She bailed out and parachuted to the ground. The nearby locals were shocked when they rushed to help and discovered that she was a woman. She was taken back to base, where Pamyatnykh learnt that the German attack had been prevented as the rest of the force had turned back. For her heroism, Pamyatnykh was awarded the Order of the Red Banner and given a gold watch by King George VI of the United Kingdom.

During another mission she was downed by friendly fire. In 1944, she married Nikolai Chasnyk, a Hero of the Soviet Union and deputy squadron commander in the 148th Guards Fighter Aviation Regiment. They both survived the war, although he spent some time in a Nazi concentration camp. Following the end of the war, they had three children. Pamyatnykh later went on to become the chairman of the women's war veterans' commission.
