= Mariya Kuznetsova (pilot) =

Soviet fighter pilot (1918–1990)

- Мария Михайловна Кузнецова
- Born: 14 April 1918; Yazvishchi village, Moscow Governorate, RSFSR
- Died: 12 October 1990 (aged 72); Moscow, USSR
- Military career
- Allegiance: Soviet Union
- Branch: Soviet Air Force
- Rank: Senior lieutenant
- Conflicts: World War II
- Awards: Order of the Patriotic War 2nd class Order of the Red Star

Mariya Mikhailovna Kuznetsova (Russian: Мария Михайловна Кузнецова; 14 April 1918 – 12 October 1990) was a Soviet fighter pilot who originally flew with the women's 586th Fighter Aviation Regiment but was later transferred to the 437th Fighter Aviation Regiment with Yekaterina Budanova, Lydia Litvyak, and several other members of the unit in September 1942. While she did not become an ace, she made it through the Battle of Stalingrad, unlike many of her colleagues transferred there.

== Civilian life ==
Kuznetsova was born on 4 April 1918 to a Russian peasant family in Yazvishchi village, Moscow Governorate, RSFSR. She began flying when she was 18, but her father was arrested during the Red Terror in 1937, forcing her to note the arrest in applications and documents, resulting in her being kicked out of flight training several times for being related to an "enemy of the people"; however, her friends spoke up on her behalf and managed to convince the head of the flight school to let her stay. After the war she married Vladimir Pavlovich Zhukotsky, commander of the 802nd Fighter Aviation Regiment.

== World War II ==
After transferring to the Red Army from Osoviahim in October 1941 she began training at Engels Military Aviation School until she was deployed to defend important structures in Saratov from German bombers with the 586th Fighter Aviation Regiment. In September 1942 she was transferred to the 437th Fighter Aviation Regiment with Yekaterina Budanova, Lydia Litvyak, and Raisa Belyaeva; the reasons for the transfer are disputed among historians, ranging from the need for experienced pilots in the Battle of Stalingrad to Tamara Kazarinova wanting to get rid of the pilots who complained about her. In a postwar interview with Anne Noggle, Kuznetsova claimed to have shot down three enemy aircraft, including a Ju 87 and Ju 88, but there is no confirmation of this in her award sheets or regiment documents. It is confirmed that she flew over 100 sorties, providing cover for strategically valuable targets and escorting Li-2 transport aircraft. After serving with the predominantly male fighter aviation regiment in Stalingrad she did not want to return to her original unit, the 586th Fighter Aviation Regiment, because it was an air defense unit that saw less intense combat; however, she was forced to do so under threat of tribunal, despite complaining that she wouldn't be "deserting" to the reserve but to the frontlines. During the war she was featured alongside Litvyak and Budanova in the military aviation newspaper Stalinsky Sokol.

== Awards ==
Sources:

- Two Order of the Patriotic War 2nd class (21 February 1944 and 1985)
- Order of the Red Star (28 September 1944)
- Campaign and jubilee medals
