= Raisa Surnachevskaya =

Soviet fighter pilot

- Раиса Нефедовна Сурначевская
- Born: 8 August 1922; Moscow, Soviet Union
- Died: 18 December 2005 (aged 83); Dnipropetrovsk, Ukraine
- Military career
- Allegiance: Soviet Union
- Branch: Soviet Air Force
- Service years: 1941 — 1945
- Rank: Lieutenant
- Unit: 586th Fighter Aviation Regiment
- Conflicts: World War II; Eastern Front
- Awards: Order Of The Patriotic War (2nd Class)

Raisa Nefedovna Surnachevskaya (Russian: Раиса Нефедовна Сурначевская; 8 August 1922 – 18 December 2005) was a Soviet fighter pilot and squadron commander during World War II, as well as one of the very few pregnant women to have flown in combat. After the German invasion of the Soviet Union in 1941 she volunteered to join a women's aviation regiment founded by Marina Raskova and underwent training to fly Yakovlev Yak-1 fighters at Engels military Aviation School. She was assigned to the 586th Fighter Aviation Regiment for the war; on a mission with Tamara Pamyatnykh she shot down two Junkers Ju 88 bombers while patrolling a railway junction after a formation of 42 bombers approached. After they each shot down two planes and Pamyatnykh attempted to ram a third the formation turned around without dropping their payloads on the railways.

== See also ==
- Tamara Pamyatnykh
