= Tamara Kazarinova =

- Native name: Тамара Казаринова
- Born: 9 July 1906; Moscow, Russian Empire
- Died: 4 August 1956 (aged 50) Moscow, Soviet Union
- Allegiance: Soviet Union
- Branch: Soviet Air Force
- Service years: 1929–1954
- Rank: Lieutenant Colonel
- Commands: 586th Fighter Aviation Regiment
- Conflicts: World War II
- Awards: Order of Lenin; Order of the Red Banner

Tamara Aleksandrovna Kazarinova (Russian: Тамара Александровна Казаринова; 9 July 1906 – 4 August 1956) was a Soviet pilot and the commander of the 586th Fighter Aviation Regiment during the Second World War until she was transferred to the General Directorate of Fighter Aviation Defense.

== Early life ==
Kazarinova graduated from the Leningrad Military Theory Air Force School in 1929 with excellent marks and the Kachin Military Pilots School in 1931. Before entering flight school with recommendations from the Komsomol she worked at a factory in Moscow. Since she was the first female cadet to enter the Leningrad school she had to live in an apartment off-campus while she studied. After completing further training in Kachin she served as a flight instructor and rose through the ranks to become a squadron commander in an assault aviation unit. She received the Order of Lenin, one of the highest Soviet awards, in 1937 during the height of the Great Purge and was able to maintain a good standing in the Soviet Air Forces during those times.

== World War II ==
After the German invasion of the Soviet Union and the formation of three women's aviation regiments by Marina Raskova, Kazarinova was appointed commander of the 586th Fighter Aviation Regiment. The volunteers assigned to the regiment hoped that Yevgeniya Prokhorova, who was generally well-liked by her colleagues, would become the official regimental commander; however Prokhorova was not a member of the Communist Party, and she had little previous military experience. Kazarinova was eventually chosen due to her military experience but quickly ended up getting into various disputes with Raskova, causing speculation that her appointment as regimental commander was the result of Kazarinova's friends in high places including General Osipenko in addition to her status as a recipient of the Order of Lenin. While the crew of the 586th Regiment underwent training for Yak-1 fighters at Engels Military Aviation School in Saratov, Kazarinova studied at a flight institute in Grozny where she sustained a severe leg injury during an air raid that left her with a limp and unable to fly. Despite having been rendered unable to fly she insisted on remaining regimental commander and went to the front when the regiment was deployed. Several members of the regiment complained to her superiors about her leadership, citing her lack of knowledge of fighter tactics combined with her inability to fly left her unfit to remain regimental commander. Tensions grew in the regiment between those who considered her a good commander and those who disliked her, which was not helped by her cold temperament. To sweep some of the issues under the rug, she sent eight members of the regiment to Stalingrad, where five of the eight sent out would be killed in action, two of whom went on to become credited as the only female flying aces in history before their deaths - Lydia Litvak and Yekaterina Budanova. Eventually in November 1942 Kazarinova was removed from her post by General Mikhail Gromadin after her actions led to the death of Valeria Khomyakova, who had died in a plane crash after she was assigned to the night watch even though she was exhausted and had fallen asleep in the dugout only to be awoken by her commander who sent her out for a night flight, resulting in Khomyakova crashing since her eyes hadn't adjusted to the dark with the lack of lighting in the airfield. After removing her from her post as commander Mikhail Gromadin requested General Osipenko to open an investigation into the death of Khomyakova, but instead of doing so Osipenko just transferred her to his staff. The new commander appointed to the 586th Regiment was Aleksandr Gridnev, a pilot recently released from NKVD custody for refusing to fly an escort flight for Beria in poor weather. In 1943 Kazarinova achieved the rank of Lieutenant Colonel and was appointed assistant to the director of the 4th Department of the Central Administration of the Air Defense Agency of the Customs Union. In 1945 she was appointed as assistant to the chief of the intelligence department of the 1st Airborne Fighter Defense Army. In 1954 she entered the reserve and died in Moscow two years later; she was buried in the Preobrazhenskoe cemetery.

External image
- Grave

== See also ==
- Yevdokia Bershanskaya - Commander of the 46th Taman Guards Night Bomber Aviation Regiment
- Marina Raskova - Commander of the 587th Dive Bomber Regiment and founder of three women's aviation regiments
- Valentina Grizodubova - Commander of the 101st Long-Range Aviation Regiment
