= Aleksandr Gridnev =

- Александр Васильевич Гриднев
- Born: 4 April 1909; Maksimovka village, Samara Governorate, Russian Empire (located within present-day Bogatovsky District, Russia)
- Died: 1995 (aged 85–86); Volgograd, Russian Federation
- Military career
- Allegiance: Soviet Union
- Branch: Soviet Air Force
- Rank: Lieutenant colonel
- Awards: Two Order of the Red Banner

Aleksandr Vasilevich Gridnev (Russian: Александр Васильевич Гриднев; 4 April 1909 – 1995) was a Soviet military officer and flying ace who commanded the Women's 586th Fighter Aviation Regiment after the departure of its previous commander, Tamara Kazarinova.

== Early life ==
Gridnev was born on 4 April 1909 to a Russian family in the village of Makimovka, located in what is now the Bogatovsky District. Orphaned at the age of twelve, he was sent to work at the Issyk-Kul mill in 1923. From 1926 until he entered the Red Army in 1928 he worked for the Komsomol. After briefly serving in the Special Far Eastern Army he entered the Moscow Industrial Pedagogical Institute in 1929, but soon returned to the military in 1931 and attended the Stalingrad Military Aviation School of Pilots, where he went on to serve as a flight instructor after graduation. Starting in 1939 he was posted as a deputy squadron commander in fighter aviation unit.

== World War II ==
Appointed as commander of the 82nd Air Defense Fighter Aviation Regiment in January 1942, he entered active hostilities on the warfront in May later that year, equipped with the British Hawker Hurricane fighter. However, he did not hold the post for very long, since he was arrested by the NKVD for allegedly endangering the life of Lavrenty Beria; on 13 August 1942, Gridnev and his crew were assigned to flying an escort flight for Beria's Li-2 transport plane, but by the time they were scheduled to take off from Krasnovodsk, a severe dust storm ensued, clouding visibility conditions. Gridnev and his supporters insisted that going through with the escort flight as planned would have been suicidal for both parties due to the high risk of mid-air collision, and doing so was in direct violation of Stalin's order prohibiting flights in such conditions in the area after numerous previous accidents. Nevertheless, he was arrested by the NKVD, which claimed that he attempted to take off alone in the low visibility conditions to shoot down the Li-2 without witnesses to get revenge for Tukhachevsky. Eventually, after prolonged violent interrogations and the support of other aviators who defended the decision to not take off in the dust storm in accordance with Stalin's orders, he was released in October, although few generals were willing to appoint him to a command role. However, he was able to become a regimental commander again, since the women's 586th Fighter Aviation Regiment was in need of a commander upon the departure of Tamara Kazarinova and he was posted to command of it on 27 October 1942. During the war he flew with the unit on missions, tallying five solo and four shared shootdowns in the course of 134 sorties, but it was not until April 1943 that he gained his first shootdown (a Ju 88). He went on to gain several more aerial victories on the Yak-1 switching to the Yak-9.

== Postwar ==
Shortly after the end of the war he transferred to the 39th Guards Fighter Aviation Regiment in November, but was forced to retire from the military in August 1946 for health reasons. From 1950 to 1952 he served on the Budennovsk city council, and in 1956 he graduated from the Stalingrad Agricultural Institute, where he went on to work as a teacher. After founding the Volgograd School of Young Cosmonauts in 1965 he headed the institution for over 20 years, supervising the graduation of over 1500 students, many of whom went on to hold careers in the military and aviation. As a hobby Gridnev did photography and filmmaking, producing several amateur films that won awards. He died in Volgograd in 1995.

== Awards ==
- Two Order of the Red Banner
- Order of the Patriotic War 1st class
- Order of the Red Star
- campaign and jubilee medals
