= Emil Bitsch =

German World War II fighter pilot (1916–1944)

- Born: 14 June 1916; Baden, Grand Duchy of Baden, German Empire
- Died: 15 March 1944 (aged 27) near Schijndel, German-occupied Netherlands
- Cause of death: Killed in action
- Burial place: Ysselsteyn German war cemetery, Netherlands
- Military career
- Allegiance: Nazi Germany
- Branch: Luftwaffe
- Rank: Hauptmann (captain)
- Nickname: Birth
- Unit: JG 3
- Commands: 8./JG 3
- Conflicts: See battles World War II: Operation Barbarossa; Eastern Front; Battle of Stalingrad; Defense of the Reich †; Second Raid on Schweinfurt
- Awards: Knight's Cross of the Iron Cross

Emil Bitsch (14 June 1916 – 15 March 1944) was a Luftwaffe flying ace of World War II. He was one of the most successful pilots on the Eastern Front; being credited with 108 aerial victories. He claimed 104 over the Eastern Front and four four-engine bombers over the Western Front. He may have been the pilot that shot down Soviet female ace Yekaterina Budanova. Bitsch was killed in action against United States Army Air Forces (USAAF) fighters on 15 March 1944.

== Career ==
Bitsch was born on 14 June 1916 in Bad Griesbach in the Grand Duchy of Baden within the German Empire.

World War II in Europe had begun on Friday 1 September 1939 when German forces invaded Poland. In July 1941, Bitsch served with III. Gruppe (3rd group) of Jagdgeschwader 3 (JG 3–3rd Fighter Wing), based on the Eastern Front and under the command of Walter Oesau. (Note: On 1 December 1941, JG 3 was given the honorary name "Udet" following the suicide of World War I fighter pilot and Luftwaffe Generalleutnant Ernst Udet.) The Wehrmacht had launched Operation Barbarossa, the invasion of the Soviet Union, on 22 June 1941. III. Gruppe supported Army Group South in its strategic goal towards the heavily populated and agricultural heartland of Ukraine, taking Kiev before continuing eastward over the steppes of southern USSR to the Volga with the aim of controlling the oil-rich Caucasus.

Operating from an airfield at Lutsk, Bitsch claimed his first victory on 2 July over an Ilyushin Il-2. He had a total of five victories by the end of the year. He claimed two Russian Yak-4 twin-engine fighters which were shot down on 24 June 1942 to claim his 9th and 10th victories. In July, he claimed 15 victories, including his 20th 'kill' which he shot down on 13 July. Bitsch recorded 18 victories in August, including his 30th victim shot down on 16 August; his score had risen to 40 on 28 August. On 6 November, III. Gruppe was withdrawn from the Eastern Front and sent to Mannheim-Sandhofen Airfield for a period of rest and replenishment. The first elements of the Gruppe arrived by train in Mannheim on 8 December, the transfer was completed a week later. There, the personnel was sent on home leave. The Gruppe received a full complement of 41 Messerschmitt Bf 109 F-4 aircraft and on 6 January 1942 was ordered to relocated to Sicily. On 13 January, 7. Staffel and elements of 8. and 9. Staffel boarded a train to Bari in southern Italy while the rest of III. Gruppe headed for Sciacca, Sicily. The relocation progressed until 26 January when new orders were received, ordering the Gruppe to return to Germany. At Jesau near Königsberg, present-day Kaliningrad in Russia, III. Gruppe began preparations for redeployment to the Eastern Front again.

On 4 September 1942, Oberleutnant Bitsch was shot down by anti aircraft artillery northwest of Stalingrad. He bailed out of his Messerschmitt Bf 109 F-4 (Werknummer 13325—factory number) and landed safely but suffered light injuries in the incident. He later returned to combat duty and continued flying. Bitsch claimed his 50th aerial victory on 19 March 1943, this was also III. Gruppe's 1,600 aerial victory to date. On 1 June 1943, Bitsch succeeded Oberleunant Franz Beyer who was transferred to IV. Gruppe as Staffelkapitän (squadron leader) of 8./JG 3. In July, Oberleutnant Bitsch claimed 29 aerial victories. On 5 July, he became an "ace-in-a-day", including three Ilyushin Il-2 ground-attack aircraft on one mission. On 19 July he shot a Yakovlev Yak-1 down on the Mius front, possibly flown by Soviet female ace Yekaterina Budanova. He recorded his 100th victory on 21 July 1943 over a Lavochkin La-5. He was the 46th Luftwaffe pilot to achieve the century mark. III. Gruppe flew its last combat missions on the Eastern Front on 1 August 1943. The next day, the Gruppe was ordered to Chasiv Yar and then back to Germany where it was based at Münster-Handorf Airfield.

=== Defense of the Reich and death ===
Combat box of a 12-plane B-17 squadron. Three such boxes completed a 36-plane group box.: 1. Lead Element; 2. High Element; 3. Low Element; 4. Low Low Element

III. Gruppe arrived in Münster-Handorf on 3 August where it was placed under the command of Major Walther Dahl. Dahl had been appointed Gruppenkommandeur (group commander) on 20 July 1943. The Gruppe immediately began preparations for Defense of the Reich (Reichsverteidigung) missions and was subordinated to Fighter Leader for the Holland area (Jagdfliegerführer Holland). Bitsch was awarded the Knight's Cross of the Iron Cross (Ritterkreuz des Eisernen Kreuzes) on 29 August after 104 victories claimed on the Eastern Front. On 25 August, III. Gruppe was ordered to relocate to Bad Wörishofen in southern Germany. On 1 October, the United States Army Air Forces (USAAF) attacked German aircraft production, approaching from the south, targeting the Wiener Neustadt Flugzeugwerke (WNF) in Wiener Neustadt and other targets at Friedrichshafen. At 12:30, III. Gruppe was scrambled. Approximately one hour later, the Gruppe intercepted the flight of 50 to 60 Consolidated B-24 Liberator bombers and 25 Boeing B-17 Flying Fortress bombers. In aerial combat which in parts was fought in Swiss airspace, III. Gruppe, without loss, claimed four aerial victories and three Herausschüsse (separation shots–a severely damaged heavy bomber forced to separate from its combat box and which the Luftwaffe counted as an aerial victory). In this engagement, Bitsch claimed the destruction of a B-17 which was shot down at 13:44.

On 14 October, the USAAF Eighth Air Force (USAAF) launched the second Schweinfurt raid, attacking the vital ball bearing factories at Schweinfurt. In total, 291 B-17s from the 1st and 3rd Air Division, escorted by two fighter groups, were sent on the mission. The USAAF suffered heavy losses that day. III. Gruppe claimed eighteen aerial victories and Herausschüsse that day. A B-17 destroyed at 14:45 was credited to Bitsch. On 19 December, the Fifteenth Air Force targeted the railroad transportation infrastructure at Insbruck as well as Messerschmitt aircraft manufacturing sites at Augsburg. III. Gruppe intercepted the bombers near Insbruck and claimed eight aerial victories, among them, a B-17 shot down by Bitsch.

Because the weather conditions at Bad Wörishofen rendered the airfield unserviceable, III. Gruppe was ordered to relocate to Leipheim on 18 February 1944. Bitsch claimed his 108th and last aerial victory on 23 February during the USAAF "Big Week" operation. On 15 March 1944, 344 heavy bombers of 2nd and 3rd Air Division, escorted by 588 fighter aircraft, attacked German aircraft manufacturing at Braunschweig. At 10:57, 20 aircraft from III. Gruppe took off at Leipheim and were initially ordered to Wiesbaden-Erbenheim. While the flight was still airborne, the Gruppe received further instructions and were vectored to intercept the USAAF bombers on their return from the target area. In the vicinity of Volkel in North Brabant, Netherlands, III. Gruppe came under attack of approximately 20 to 30 Republic P-47 Thunderbolt fighters. In this engagement, III. Gruppe lost six Messerschmitt Bf 109 G-6 fighters for one aerial victory claimed. That day, Bitsch was shot down and killed in action by a P-47 of the 352d Fighter Group in his Bf 109 G-6 (Werknummer 161139) 4 kilometers (2.5 miles) west of Schijndel. Bitsch was succeeded by Oberleutnant Raimund Koch as commander of 8. Staffel.

== Post-war ==
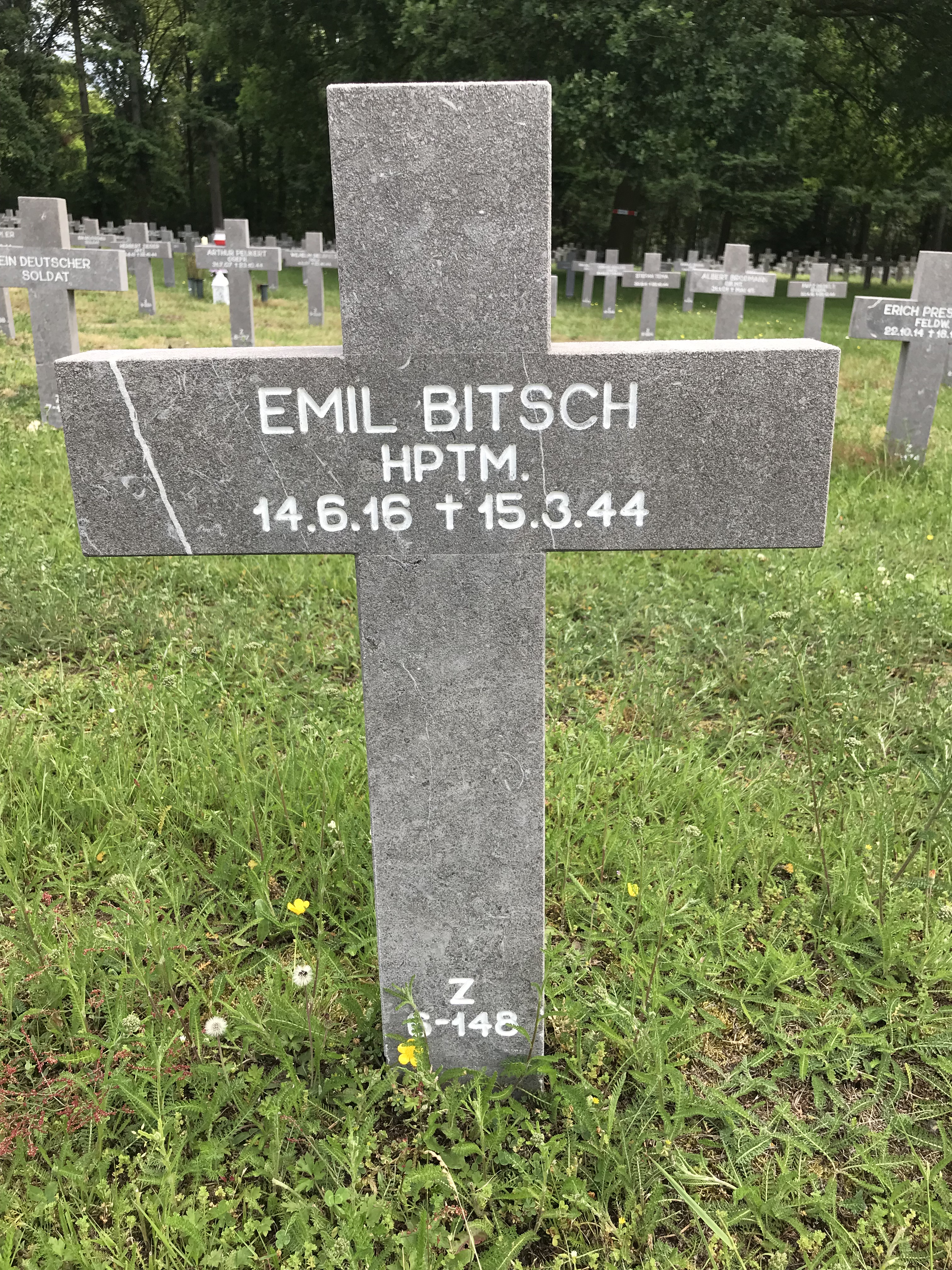
German War Cemetery Ysselsteyn – Emil Bitsch

Bitsch is buried at the German war cemetery at Ysselsteyn (in the Netherlands). The crash site was rediscovered in 1994 by Thijs Hellings, a researcher of the World War II airwar from Schijndel. With help from the landowner, remains of the plane were recovered including the radio, armored glass, the compass and many other small items.

== Summary of career ==
=== Aerial victory claims ===
According to US historian David T. Zabecki, Bitsch was credited with 108 aerial victories. Mathews and Foreman, authors of Luftwaffe Aces – Biographies and Victory Claims, researched the German Federal Archives and found records for 106 aerial victory claims. This figure includes 105 aerial victories on the Eastern Front and one four-engined bomber on the Western Front.

Victory claims were logged to a map-reference (PQ = Planquadrat), for example "PQ 34 Ost 7546". The Luftwaffe grid map (Jägermeldenetz) covered all of Europe, western Russia and North Africa and was composed of rectangles measuring 15 minutes of latitude by 30 minutes of longitude, an area of about 360 square miles (930 km^{2}). These sectors were then subdivided into 36 smaller units to give a location area 3 km × 4 km (1.9 mi × 2.5 mi) in size.

Chronicle of aerial victories
This and the ♠ (Ace of spades) indicates those aerial victories which made Bitsch an "ace-in-a-day", a term which designates a fighter pilot who has shot down five or more airplanes in a single day. This along with the * (asterisk) indicates an Herausschuss (separation shot)—a severely damaged heavy bomber forced to separate from his combat box which was counted as an aerial victory. This and the ? (question mark) indicates information discrepancies listed by Prien, Stemmer, Rodeike, Bock, Mathews and Foreman.
Claim	Date	Time	Type	Location	Claim	Date	Time	Type	Location
– 8. Staffel of Jagdgeschwader 3 – Operation Barbarossa – 22 June – 5 December 1941
1	2 July 1941	12:28	V-11 (Il-2)		4	3 October 1941	14:42	V-11 (Il-2)	
2	10 July 1941	14:45	I-16	2 km (1.2 mi) south of Sabelotschje	5	5 October 1941	14:38	SB-3	
3	20 September 1941	17:06	Pe-2		6	5 November 1941	11:55	I-61 (MiG-3)	
– 8. Staffel of Jagdgeschwader 3 "Udet" – Eastern Front – 10 February 1942 – 14 April 1942
7	26 February 1942	14:33	I-301 (LaGG-3)	south of Staraya Russa	9	19 March 1942	08:57	I-61 (MiG-3)	30 km (19 mi) south of Staraya Russa
8	15 March 1942	12:58	Pe-2	40 km (25 mi) south of Demyansk					
– 8. Staffel of Jagdgeschwader 3 "Udet" – Eastern Front – 19 May – 13 August 1942
10	24 June 1942	18:12	Yak-4	northeast of Shchigry	21	13 July 1942	09:58	R-10	
11	24 June 1942	18:17	Yak-4	northeast of Stary Tschenoissinowo	22	26 July 1942	16:15	LaGG-3	
12	2 July 1942	07:00	MiG-3		23	26 July 1942	16:18	LaGG-3	
13	2 July 1942	12:10	Boston		24	28 July 1942	13:13	LaGG-3	
14	2 July 1942	12:13	Boston		25	31 July 1942	11:05	Pe-2	southeast of Kalach
15	3 July 1942	19:25	Il-2		26	31 July 1942	11:42	Il-2	west of Kletskaya
16	3 July 1942	19:26	Il-2		27	7 August 1942	17:40	Pe-2	southwest of Stalingrad
17	4 July 1942	17:16	Boston		28	7 August 1942	17:41	Pe-2	40 km (25 mi) southwest of Stalingrad
18	4 July 1942	17:17	Boston		29	12 August 1942	18:00	LaGG-3	southeast of Kalach
19	5 July 1942	06:20	Yak-4		30	13 August 1942	09:35	MiG-3	north of Pasow
20	5 July 1942	06:22	Yak-4						
– 9. Staffel of Jagdgeschwader 3 "Udet" – Eastern Front – 16 August 1942 – 3 February 1943
31	16 August 1942	09:35	MiG-3	5 km (3.1 mi) south of Jagowo	40	28 August 1942	17:00	LaGG-3	northeast of Stalingrad
32	19 August 1942	17:50	Il-2	southeast of Katschalinskaya	41	28 August 1942	17:20	Il-2	east of Stalingrad
33	19 August 1942	17:55	R-5	southeast of Katschalinskaya	42	29 August 1942	06:05	LaGG-3	northwest of Dubovka
34	20 August 1942	16:22	Pe-2	south-southwest of Rajgorod	43	30 August 1942	16:50	Il-2	west of Sarepta
35	20 August 1942	16:26	Pe-2	west of Lake Svetlija	44	31 August 1942	10:45	Il-2	east of Sarepta
36	21 August 1942	17:40	LaGG-3	east of Stalingrad	45	2 September 1942	17:10	Pe-2	21 km (13 mi) northeast of Stalingrad
37	25 August 1942	05:30	R-5	Stalingrad	46	2 September 1942	17:11	Pe-2	20 km (12 mi) northeast of Stalingrad
38	27 August 1942	05:25	I-16	Akhtuba	47	4 September 1942	06:55	Il-2	2 km (1.2 mi) west of Stalingrad
39	27 August 1942	15:20	LaGG-3	north-northwest of Akhtuba					
– 8. Staffel of Jagdgeschwader 3 "Udet" – Eastern Front – 4 February – March 1943
48	9 March 1943	11:35	Yak-1	Petrovsky	? (Note: This claim is listed by Mathews and Foreman as Bitsch's 50th aerial victory. It is also listed by Prien and Stemmer in their 1996 history of III. Gruppe of JG 3 "Udet" as his 50th claim. However, this claim is not listed in the 2008 edition of "The Fighter Units of the German Air Force 1934 to 1945—Part 10/II—Defense of the Reich—1 January to 31 December 1943" by Prien, Stemmer, Rodeike and Bock.)	16 March 1943	15:15	La-5? (Note: According to Mathews and Foreman claimed as a Yakovlev Yak-4.)	
49	9 March 1943	11:37	Yak-1	southwest of Petrovsky					
– 9. Staffel of Jagdgeschwader 3 "Udet" – Eastern Front – March – April 1943
50	19 March 1943	10:38	Il-2	3 km (1.9 mi) south of Stary	55	23 April 1943	09:15	P-39	PQ 34 Ost 7546, Kabardinka
51	20 March 1943	08:45	LaGG-3	10 km (6.2 mi) southwest of Rostov-on-Don	56	27 April 1943	04:45	Il-2	PQ 34 Ost 8812, southeast of Makiivka
52	23 March 1943	15:46	Il-2	12 km (7.5 mi) east of Chuhuiv	57	27 April 1943	04:50	LaGG-3	PQ 34 Ost 8823, southeast of Makiivka
53	25 March 1943	13:50	LaGG-3	20 km (12 mi) south of Rostov-on-Don	58	27 April 1943	04:52	LaGG-3	PQ 34 Ost 8979, east of Makiivka
54	20 April 1943	08:35	LaGG-3		59	29 April 1943	09:20	R-5	PQ 34 Ost 9868, south of Massalskoje
? (Note: This claim is listed by Mathews and Foreman as Bitsch's 56th aerial victory. However, this claim is not listed in the 2008 edition of "The Fighter Units of the German Air Force 1934 to 1945—Part 10/II—Defense of the Reich—1 January to 31 December 1943" by Prien, Stemmer, Rodeike and Bock.)	20 April 1943	11:05	Il-2	2 km (1.2 mi) south of Novorossiysk					
– 8. Staffel of Jagdgeschwader 3 "Udet" – Eastern Front – 4 February – 1 August 1943
60? (Note: This claim is not listed by Mathews and Foreman.)	2 May 1943	06:05	LaGG-3	east of Starobilsk	83	8 July 1943	05:57	Pe-2	PQ 35 Ost 6123, southeast of Prokhorovka
61	6 May 1943	18:10	Il-2	southeast of Slavyansk	84	8 July 1943	13:02	La-5	PQ 35 Ost 6127, north of Belgorod
62	6 May 1943	18:13	Il-2	east of Krasnyi Lyman	85	8 July 1943	13:12	LaGG-3	PQ 35 Ost 6124, north of Belgorod
63	9 May 1943	06:55	LaGG-3	Bataysk	86	11 July 1943	13:35	La-5	PQ 35 Ost 6124, southeast of Werchopenje
64	9 May 1943	16:10	Pe-2	northeast of Krasnyi Lyman	87	11 July 1943	13:35	La-5	PQ 35 Ost 6124, southeast of Werchopenje
65	12 May 1943	05:05	Il-2	southwest of Izium	88	13 July 1943	05:39	La-5	PQ 35 Ost 6287, west of Prokhorovka
66	14 May 1943	17:35	Il-2	east of Pribodnoje	89	13 July 1943	05:41	La-5	PQ 35 Ost 6288, west of Prokhorovka
67	24 May 1943	07:14	I-16	west of Bataysk	90	15 July 1943	18:10	Pe-2	PQ 35 Ost 7072, Izium
68	24 May 1943	07:17	I-16	west of Bataysk	91	16 July 1943	04:57	La-5	east of Izium
69	10 June 1943	08:45	La-5	north of Starobilsk-Ost	92	16 July 1943	18:25	Yak-1	PQ 34 Ost 89142
70	11 June 1943	11:01	La-5	east of Pokrowskoje	93	17 July 1943	10:25	Il-2	8 km (5.0 mi) south of Izium
71	13 June 1943	04:05	LaGG-3	southeast of Starobilsk	94	19 July 1943	05:35	La-5	PQ 35 Ost 7087, southeast of Izium
72	13 June 1943	04:15	LaGG-3	east of Starobilsk	95	19 July 1943	05:42	La-5	PQ 35 Ost 7085, southeast of Izium
73	15 June 1943	17:34	LaGG-3	north of Starobilsk	96	19 July 1943	05:45	La-5	PQ 35 Ost 7068, northeast of Izium
74	2 July 1943	09:40	LaGG-3	PQ 34 Ost 7922, southeast of Sslawjansk	97	19 July 1943	12:10	Yak-1	PQ 35 Ost 9814
75♠	5 July 1943	03:21? (Note: According to Mathews and Foreman claimed at 07:47.)	Il-2	east of Belgorod	98	20 July 1943	04:15	La-5	PQ 35 Ost 7075, Izium
76♠	5 July 1943	03:25	Il-2	east of Belgorod	99	20 July 1943	04:20	La-5	PQ 35 Ost 7072, Izium
77♠	5 July 1943	07:42	Il-2	PQ 35 Ost 61184, west of Volchansk	100	21 July 1943	14:14	Il-2	PQ 34 Ost 7913, northwest of Sslawjank
78♠	5 July 1943	07:51	Il-2	northwest of Prokhorovka	101	31 July 1943	05:35	LaGG-3	PQ 34 Ost 8826
79♠	5 July 1943	12:35	LaGG-3	PQ 35 Ost 6133, southeast of Prokhorovka	102	31 July 1943	05:55	LaGG-3	PQ 34 Ost 8823
80♠	5 July 1943	16:40	Il-5	PQ 35 Ost 6149, southeast of Belgorod	103	1 August 1943	10:30	Il-2	PQ 34 Ost 8822
81	7 July 1943	04:15	Il-2	PQ 35 Ost 6162, southeast of Belgorod	104	1 August 1943	10:32	Il-2	PQ 34 Ost 8825
82	7 July 1943	17:15	La-5	PQ 35 Ost 6127, east of Jakowlewo					
– 8. Staffel of Jagdgeschwader 3 "Udet" – Defense of the Reich – 8 August 1943 – 15 March 1944
? (Note: This claim is also not listed by Prien, Stemmer, Rodeike and Bock.)	1 October 1943	13:44	B-17		107	19 December 1943	12:28	B-17	PQ 04 Ost S/KC
105?	14 October 1943	14:45	B-17	southeast of Schweinfurt	108?	23 February 1944	—	B-24	
106? (Note: This claim is also not listed by Prien and Stemmer.)	14 October 1943	14:55	B-17*	north of Arnstein					

=== Awards ===
- Iron Cross (1939) 2nd and 1st Class
- Honor Goblet of the Luftwaffe on 31 August 1942 as Leutnant and pilot
- German Cross in Gold on 19 October 1942 as a Leutnant in the I./Jagdgeschwader 3
- Knight's Cross of the Iron Cross on 29 August 1943 as an Oberleutnant (war officer) and Staffelkapitän of the 8./Jagdgeschwader 3 "Udet"
