= Aleksey Solomatin =

Soviet flying ace (1921–1943)

Aleksey Frolovich Solomatin
- Born: 12 February 1921; Bunakovo-2, Russian SFSR
- Died: 21 May 1943 (aged 22); Pavlovka, Soviet Union
- Military career
- Branch: Soviet Air Force
- Service years: 1941 –1943
- Rank: Captain
- Unit: 73rd Guards Fighter Aviation Regiment
- Conflicts: "Battle of seven versus 25"
- Awards: Hero of the Soviet Union; Order of Lenin (2); Order of the Red Banner

Aleksey Frolovich Solomatin (Russian: Алексе́й Фро́лович Солома́тин; 12 February 1921 – 21 May 1943) was a squadron commander and flying ace in the Soviet Air Forces during World War II who was awarded the title Hero of the Soviet Union.

== Life ==
Solomatin was born on 12 February 1921, in Bunakovo-2 village, Ferikovsky District, Kaluga Oblast, in a large peasant family. He joined the Army in 1939, attending the Kacha Military Air College. When the Great Patriotic War broke out, he was serving with the 160th Reserve Aviation Regiment near Odessa, in Ukraine. Later he was transferred close to Krivoy Rog, in the 296 IAP (296th Fighter Regiment), 268th Aviation Division, 8th Army Air, Southern Front. On 9 March 1942, he took part in a famed air combat that had extensive coverage in Soviet media. Boris Eryomin, commander of second squadron of 296th Regiment, led Solomatin and five more pilots, flying the Yakovlev Yak-1 fighter, to attack a large Luftwaffe formation: 12 Messerschmitt Bf 109Es carrying bombs, seven Junkers Ju 88 bombers and six more escorting Bf 109s. The Yakovlev pilots claimed seven kills for no losses. Solomatin's Yak-1 was damaged but he managed to remain in the fight till the end and was credited with the destruction of a Bf 109. By February 1943 he had claimed 12 individuals and 15 shared kills, in 108 combats and 266 sorties. Then his unit was renamed 73 GvIAP (73rd Guards Fighter Aviation Regiment) and he was promoted Kapitan (Captain). While in 73 GvIAP, he often flew with Lidya Litvyak as his wingman. On 1 May 1943, he was awarded the title and Golden Star (no. 955) of Hero of the Soviet Union.

== Death ==
Solomatin was killed on 21 May 1943, when his Yakovlev Yak-1 crashed in the village of Pavlovka, Rostov Oblast. He was at the time credited with 13 individual air victories and 6 to 16 shared.
