= Alexander Osipenko (pilot) =

Soviet military aviator

Alexander Stepanovich Osipenko
- Александр Степанович Осипенко
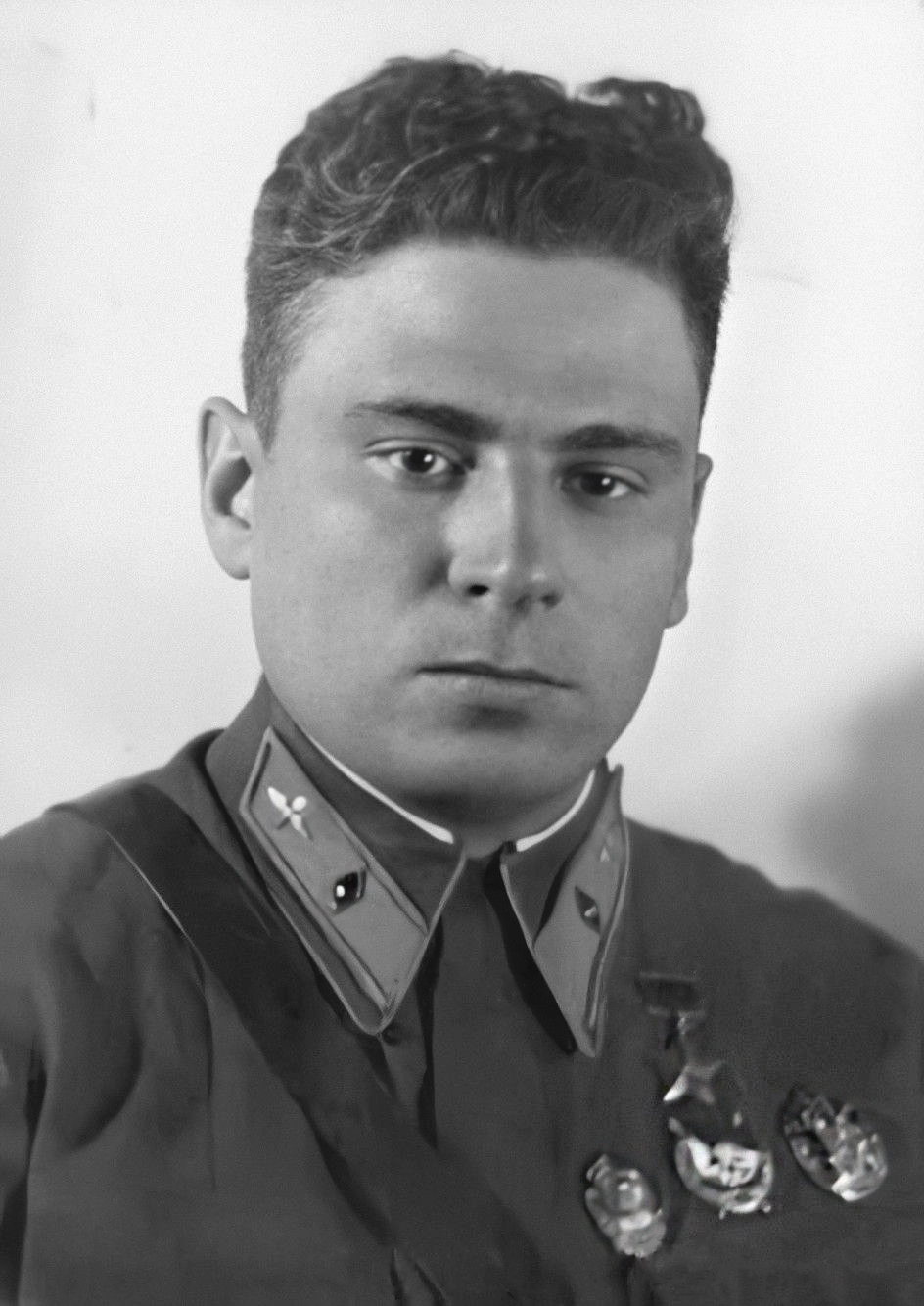
- Born: 1 June [O.S. 19 May] 1910; Tursevo-Kula, Grand Duchy of Finland, Russian Empire
- Died: 22 July 1991 (aged 81); Moscow, Soviet Union
- Spouse: Polina Osipenko
- Military career
- Allegiance: Soviet Union
- Branch: Soviet Air Forces
- Service years: 1929–1954
- Rank: Lieutenant general
- Unit: 1st Escuadrilla de Caza
- Conflicts: Spanish Civil War; World War II
- Awards: Hero of the Soviet Union

Alexander Stepanovich Osipenko (Russian: Александр Степанович Осипенко; 1 June [O.S. 19 May] 1910 – 22 July 1991) was a Soviet military aviator and, according to some accounts, the Soviet Air Forces' top ace in the Spanish Civil War.

== Early life ==
Osipenko was born in Tursevo-Kula village, in what is now Finland prior to the First World War. In 1918 he was living with his family in Smolensk and in 1929 joined the Soviet Air Forces, rising to the position of squadron leader in 1937.

== Service history ==
In January 1938 Osipenko went to Spain to service with the Spanish Republican Air Force. He flew with the 1st Escuadrilla de Caza, and was a successful fighter pilot, though his record is contradictory. One source credits him with 17 individual and 34 shared aerial combat victories making him the most successful Soviet pilot of the conflict. On his return to the Soviet Union Osipenko was made Hero of the Soviet Union.

At the outbreak of the Great Patriotic War in June 1941 Osipenko was a divisional commander on the Southern Front; he rose to Corps commander in September 1943 and also served as deputy commander of the countries fighter air defence.

After the war he served in various posts until his retirement in 1954, after which he held several academic posts connected with aviation.

Alexander Osipenko died on 22 July 1991 in Moscow.
