= Yekaterina Budanova =

Fighter pilot in the Soviet Air Force during World War II

- Born: 6 December 1916; Konoplanka, Smolensk Governorate, Russia
- Died: 19 July 1943 (aged 26); Novokrasnovka, Luhansk Oblast, Ukrainian SSR, Soviet Union
- Military career
- Allegiance: Soviet Union
- Branch: Soviet Air Force
- Service years: 1941–1943
- Rank: Captain
- Nickname: Katya
- Awards: Hero of the Russian Federation

Yekaterina Vasilyevna Budanova (Russian: Екатерина Васильевна Буданова), nicknamed Katya (Катя) (6 December 1916 – 19 July 1943), was a fighter pilot in the Soviet Air Force during World War II. Usually credited with five or more aerial victories, along with Lydia Litvyak, she is often considered one of the world's two female fighter aces. She was shot down by either Luftwaffe ace Georg Schwientek of JG 52 or ace Emil Bitsch, of JG 3.

== Early life ==
Budanova was born into a peasant family in Konoplanka village in Smolensk Governorate. After leaving elementary school with the highest grades, she had to abandon her studies due to her father's death, and began working as a nanny. At the age of thirteen her mother sent her to join her sister in Moscow, where she began working as a carpenter in an aircraft factory. It was there that she began an interest in aviation, and she joined an aeroclub's parachutist section, obtaining her flying license in 1934 and graduating to flight instructor in 1937. She took part in several air parades, flying the single-seater Yakovlev UT-1.

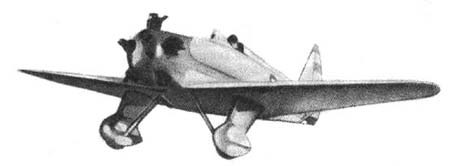
Yakovlev UT-1: Katya Budanova flew this type of aircraft in several air parades over Moscow before the Great Patriotic War

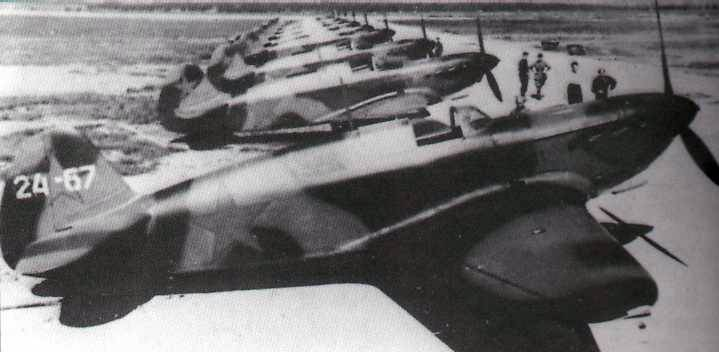
Yak-1 fighters, the type flown by Budanova during World War II, lined up on an airfield in 1941

== World War II ==
After the German attack on the USSR in June 1941, she enlisted in military aviation and was assigned to the 586th Fighter Aviation Regiment, formed by Marina Raskova. This unit consisted entirely of female pilots and was equipped with Yak-1. Initially, the women pilots were placed into three all-women units: the 586th Fighter Aviation Regiment, the 587th Dive Bomber Regiment, and the 588th Night Bomber Regiment. The 500 designations were originally meant to signify defense reserves. These units were originally made up of women who were flight instructors or members of pre-war flying clubs. The 586th (under Major Tamara Kazarinova) saw combat action in the spring of 1942 in the rear. In May 1942 the 586th Fighter Aviation Regiment redeployed to Anisovka where it was assigned to the 144th Fighter Aviation Division covering the railway installations near Saratov, and it was here Budanova flew her first combat missions. But, as the Battle of Stalingrad raged, the supply of replacement male pilots was drying up and thus, seeing the skill of these women, the Soviet High Command began dispersing selected female pilots to existing male units. On 10 September, Budanova was assigned with Lydia Litvyak, Mariya Kuznetsova, and Raisa Belyaeva to the 437th Fighter Aviation Regiment, based in Verkhnania Akhtuba on the east bank of the Volga river engaged in the fighting over Stalingrad. The 437th was a LaGG-3 regiment, under Major Khvostikov, who was initially skeptical of the ability of women pilots. But in a short time Budanova became known for her aggressive attacking and high piloting skill.

According to some historians, she shot down her first opponent — a Messerschmitt Bf 109 fighter — on 14 September 1942, combining forces with Lydia Litvyak. According to regiment archivist Yekaterina Polunina on 2 October 1942 Budanova achieved her two first solo air victories, shooting down a Junkers Ju 88 and a Bf 109. However, Budanova's aircraft mechanic, Inna Pasportnikova, wrote that she shot down her first aircraft on 6 October when she attacked thirteen Ju 88 bombers, downing one.

From October until January 1943 Budanova and Litvyak served in the Stalingrad area with the elite 9th Guards Fighter Regiment, commanded by Lev Shestakov, a Hero of Soviet Union. This regiment consisted either of aces or people considered potential aces. One of them was Vladimir Lavrinenkov, who ended the war with 36 solo plus eleven shared shootdowns. He later recalled that Budanova "was tall, kept her hair cut short,... and in her flightsuit hardly stood out from the fellows." He characterized Budanova as a "cheerful, lively character" while Litvyak looked "thoughtful and quiet". Both he said were excellent pilots. Initially the two women had flown together, but then more often flew separately as wingmen to other pilots. While in the Stalingrad area, an order was received citing the return of the women aircrew to the 586th. Pasportnikova later recalled, "Budanova and Litvyak appealed to Lt.Col Shestakov, the commander of the 9th Guards Fighter Regiment, with a request to let them remain in the regiment." They were allowed to stay, remaining with 9th Guards Fighter Aviation Regiment for over three months.

On 10 December Budanova shot down two Messerschmitt Bf 110s. In the following months she was credited with several more aircraft.

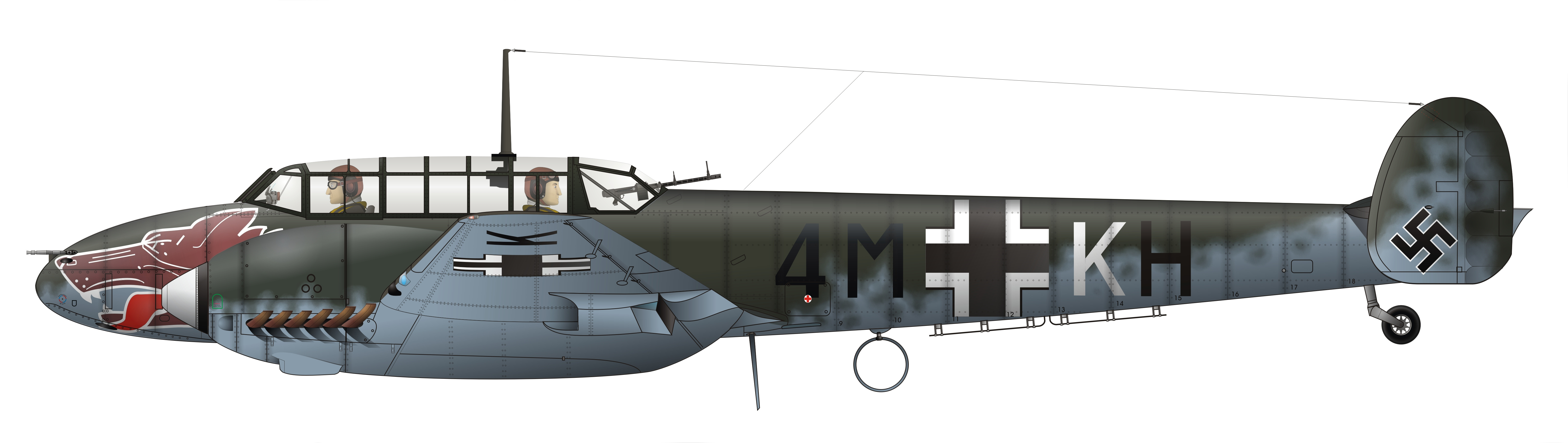
Bf 110; Budanova shot down two aircraft of this type on 10 December 1942, her first double kill

In January 1943 the 9th Guards Fighter Aviation Regiment was re-equipped with the US-built P-39 "Airacobra" and Budanova and Litvyak moved to the 296th Fighter Aviation Regiment (later the 73rd Guards Fighter Aviation Regiment) of Nikolai Baranov, and continued to fly the Yak. It was with 73rd Fighter Aviation Regiment that Budanova and Litvyak achieved the bulk of their combat claims. Budanova was selected to fly with Baranov, while squadron commander Aleksey Solomatin took Litvyak as wingman.

Budanova was soon given permission for "solo hunting", an honor given to aggressive and successful pilots.

On 10 February 1943, near Rostov on Don, she shot down a Focke-Wulf Fw 190 along with Senior Lieutenant Nikolay Demkin and the wingman, Lieutenant Boris Gorkhiver.

On 23 February she was awarded with an Order of the Red Star. On 9 March 1943 between 17.30 and 18.30 she claimed a Bf 109 along with Lieutenant Oleg Filipchenko.

On 20 April 1943 Ogonek, a political-literary weekly publication intended for young adults, featured a cover photo of Budanova and Litvyak. An article detailed their accomplishments, honoring their collective, rather than individual, achievements. The magazine gave a combined number of combat missions and kills to date for the two pilots. On 30 May under command of Soshnikov, Budanova shared in the destruction of another Bf 109.

== Last mission ==
On 19 July 1943 she flew her last mission, near Novokrasnovka. That morning she took off for an escort mission and near Antratsit in Luhansk Oblast she was involved in a dogfight with Bf 109s. Inna Pasportnikova later recalled:

"She spotted three Messerschmitt going on the attack against a group of bombers. Katya attacked and diverted the enemy. A desperate fight developed in the air. Katia managed to pick up an enemy aircraft in her sight and riddle him with bullets. This was the fifth aircraft she killed personally. Katia's fighter rapidly soared upward and swooped down on a second enemy aircraft. She "stitched" it with bullets, and the second Messer, streaming black smoke, escaped to the west. But Katia's red starred fighter had been hit; tongues of flame were already licking at the wings."

Budanova managed to put out the fire and force-landed in no-man's land. By the time local farmers came to pull her from the aircraft, she was already dead. They buried her on the outskirts of the village of Novokrasnovka. The pilot who shot her down was either Georg Schwientek of JG 52 or Emil Bitsch, of 8./JG 3, the only two pilots that claimed a Yak-1 in the Novokrasnovka area on 19 July 1943.

== Controversies about number of victories ==
There have been several different versions of Budanova's aerial victory score published, with no widely held consensus about her tally. The most common quoted is for 11 kills (6 individual and 5 shared). Some historians even claim she achieved 11 individual air victories.

Pasportnikova has stated that Budanova had five personal kills at the time of her death. Many Russian aviation historians dispute Budanova's status as a flying ace; Andrey Simonov and Svetlana Chudinova credit her with only three solo aerial victories, while Mikhail Bykov credits her with three solo and one shared aerial victory. The Soviet magazine Smena published a quote from her in an April 1943 issue claiming to have three solo and three shared victories.

== Awards ==
- Hero of the Russian Federation (1 October 1993)
- Order of the Patriotic War 1st class (22 July 1943)
- Order of the Red Star (17 February 1943)

== In popular culture ==
Pocket Jacks Comics White Lily series, featured a fictionalized Budanova as the main character of the story which closely follows her relationship with Lydia Litvyak.

== See also ==
- List of female Heroes of the Russian Federation
