= Yevgeniya Prokhorova =

Soviet aviator (1912–1942)

- Евгения Филипповна Прохорова
- Born: 17 November 1912
- Died: 3 December 1942 (aged 30)
- Military career
- Allegiance: Soviet Union
- Branch: Soviet Air Force
- Rank: Senior lieutenant
- Unit: 586th Fighter Aviation Regiment

Yevgeniya Filippovna Prokhorova (Russian: Евгения Филипповна Прохорова; 17 November 1912 – 3 December 1942) was a Soviet aviator who briefly served as the acting commander of the 586th Fighter Regiment before she was killed in action during World War II. She is still the record holder of a World Record in height gain for a single-place glider.

== Biography ==
Prokhorova was born on 17 November 1912 in Znamianka, Kirovohrad Oblast in what is now Ukraine. After graduating from school in 1932, she moved to Moscow and in 1934 was part of a flying club. In 1935, she qualified as a flight instructor and by the following year was instructing at the flying club in the Stalin District of Moscow. Before the war, Prokhorova often participated in airshows as part of a quintet of women flyers. In 1940, she established two flight records, one for range and one for altitude in her Rot Front-7 single-place class D glider. Her altitude record for gaining 3,385 m at the airfield in Tula on 26 June 1940 still stands as a world record.

In May 1941, Prokhorova was appointed commander of the Kirov flying club in Moscow and she joined the Academy of the Civil Air Fleet. She was commissioned as a pilot of the fighter regiment and served as acting commander of the 586th Fighter Aviation Regiment from December 1941 to March 1942. She died on an escort mission on 3 December 1942. Flying in fog, she hit the crest of a hill as she attempted to land on the return mission.
