= Valeria Khomyakova =

- Валерия Дмитриевна Хомякова
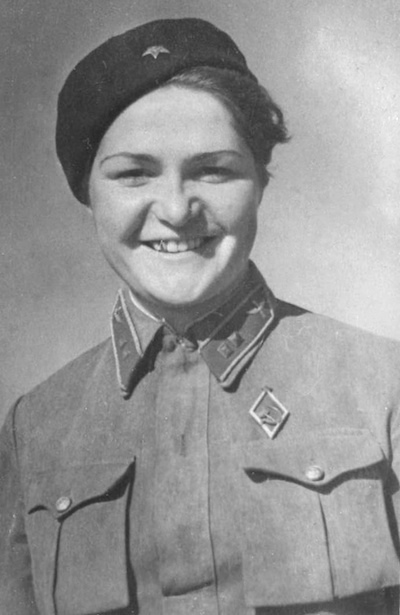
- Born: 3 August 1914; Moscow, Russian Empire
- Died: 6 October 1942 (aged 28); Saratov Oblast, Soviet Union
- Military career
- Allegiance: Soviet Union
- Branch: Soviet Air Force
- Service years: 1942
- Rank: Senior lieutenant
- Unit: 586th Fighter Aviation Regiment
- Awards: Order of the Red Banner

Valeria Dmitrievna Khomyakova (Russian: Валерия Дмитриевна Хомякова; 3 August 1914 – 6 October 1942) was a Soviet fighter pilot and military officer during World War II. She was widely reported as the first woman pilot to shoot down an enemy aircraft, but later changed to the first in a night battle. Khomyakova was killed in a flight accident only two weeks after being awarded the Order of the Red Banner.

== Biography ==
Valeria Dmitrievna Khomyakova was born in 1914 in Moscow, Russian Empire, the daughter of a chemical engineer. She completed her primary and secondary education, and in 1937 graduated from the D. Mendeleev University of Chemical Technology of Russia, taking a position as an engineer at the Frunze Plant in Moscow. Khomyakova began flying at the local flying club and became certified as a flight instructor. She was deputy commander of her squadron of the 586th Women's Fighter Regiment.

In 1942, during Nazi Germany's invasion of the Soviet Union, Khomyakova joined the Soviet Air Force. She became one of the first female fighter pilots of the Soviet Union, quickly reaching the rank of senior lieutenant, and was assigned to the 586th Air Defense Regiment, an air defense regiment of all-female fighter pilots.

On 24 September 1942, while flying night patrol over Saratov in a Yak-1, Khomyakova shot down a Junkers Ju 88 of the German Luftwaffe flown by Oberstleutnant Gerhard Maak, a decorated bomber pilot of KG 76. Ogoniok, a youth-magazine, published that it was the “first time in history that a woman fighter pilot had shot down an enemy aircraft”, and the story was repeated for decades in both Soviet and foreign press. The record has since been amended and now states that she was the first female to shoot down an enemy in a night battle.

== Death ==
Khomyakova died at an airfield in Saratov Oblast when she crashed during take-off on October 6, 1942. Shortly after shooting down Gerhard Maak's Ju 88, Khomyakova was assigned to perform numerous runs to protect supply lines and railway bridges over the Volga River, and had recently returned from Moscow where she received an Order of the Red Banner award for her achievement. Khomyakova was sleeping in a dugout when she was woken by her superior, Major Tamara Kazarinova, to make another run despite being exhausted, making her unfit for duty. Due to Khomyakova's death, Kazarinova was relieved of duty by General Mikhail Gromadin, and transferred her to his staff.
