= Klavdiya Kuzmina =

Soviet/Russian scientist

Klavdiya Alekseevna Kuzmina
- Born: 30 March 1923; Tbilisi, Soviet Georgia
- Died: 1 July 2008 (aged 85)
- Education: Saratov State Medical University
- Known for: Apitherapy
- Awards: Order of the Badge of Honour; Medal "For Valiant Labour"
- Scientific career
- Fields: Medicine, healthcare, genetics
- Workplaces: Saratov State Medical University

Klavdiya Alekseevna Kuzmina, Doctor of Medical Sciences (Russian: Клавдия Алексеевна Кузьмина; 30 March 1923, Tbilisi – 1 July 2008) was a Soviet-Russian scientist who taught at the Saratov State Medical University.

During World War II, Kuzmina worked as a nurse in an evacuation hospital. She graduated from the Saratov State Medical University in 1948, and earned her Candidat degree in 1952. From 1960 to 1974, she served as assistant dean at the Saratov State Medical University. In 1970, she defended her doctoral thesis. From 1974 to 1990, she was a member of the specialised Scientific Councils of VNIIIPCHI "Microbe" and the Saratov Medical Institute. Kuzmina headed the Department of Biology at the Saratov State Medical University.

Kuzmina authored 9 monographs and 170 papers. She established her reputation with her book, "Therapy with bee honey and venom" which has been reprinted many times. She was awarded the Order of the Badge of Honour and the medal "For Valiant Labour".
