= Belyakov =

Belyakov (Russian: Беляков) or Belyakova (Белякова; feminine), is a Russian surname, also transliterated as Beliakov and Beliakoff. It may refer to:

- Aleksandr Belyakov (born 1962), Soviet luger
- Alexander Semyonovich Belyakov (born 1945), Russian politician
- Alexander Vasilyevich Belyakov (1897–1982), Soviet aviator
- Boris Belyakov, (1927-?), Soviet fencer
- Gennady Belyakov (born 1968), Soviet luger
- Ilya Belyakov (born 1982), South Korean television personality
- Oleg Belyakov (born 1972), Russian football player
- Valeri Belyakov (born 1953), Soviet hockey player
- Vladimir Belyakov (1918–1996), Soviet gymnast
- Yelena Belyakova (born 1976), Russian pole vaulter
