= 586th Fighter Aviation Regiment =

- 586-й истребительный авиационный полк
- Active: 1941–1945
- Country: Soviet Union
- Branch: Soviet Air Force
- Engagements: Eastern Front of World War II

Commanders
- Regimental Commander: Yevgeniya Prokhorova (acting) (1941–1942); Tamara Kazarinova (1942); Aleksandr Gridnev (1942–1945)
- Commissar: Olga Pavlovna Kulikova

Aircraft flown
- Fighter: Yakovlev Yak-1; Yakovlev Yak-7; Yakovlev Yak-9

The 586th Fighter Aviation Regiment (Russian: 586-й истребительный авиационный полк, romanized: 586-y istrebitel'nyy aviatsionnyy polk) was one of the three Soviet women's aviation regiments founded by Marina Raskova at the start of the Second World War after she convinced Joseph Stalin to allow her to form three all-female aviation regiments. The regiment was originally equipped with Yakovlev Yak-1 aircraft and later acquired Yak-7 and Yak-9 aircraft in 1943. Sorties were conducted to patrol over military installations and carry out defensive missions. While the regiment was intended to be an all-female regiment it became coed with a preponderance of females after regimental commander Tamara Kazarinova transferred to another unit in October 1942 and was replaced by a man, Aleksander Gridnev. The regiment yielded two female flying aces, Lydia Litvyak and Yekaterina Budanova, who were posthumously awarded the titles Hero of the Soviet Union and Hero of the Russian Federation respectively.

== Timeline and operations ==
Twenty-five women who had joined the regiment graduated from Yak-1 flight courses on 9 December 1941. The regiment was managed by Yevgeniya Prokhorova until Tamara Kazarinova arrived to oversee the regiment's first combat operation, but Prokhorova remained the official regiment commander until March.

- 23 February 1942 – the regiment's first combat operation took place when they were assigned to patrol a railway bridge in Saratov to protect it from German bombers.
- 10 September 1942 – eight flight crews departed for Stalingrad under the command of Raisa Belyaeva. On 24 September 1942 Valeriya Khomyakova and Olga Yamshchikova each shot down a Junkers Ju 88 over Stalingrad, gaining the regiment's first aerial victories.
- 22 October 1942 – the unit was placed under the command of Aleksandr Gridnev after the death of Valeriya Khomyakova in suspicious circumstances and relocated to Voronezh.
- February to September 1943 – the regiment provided air defense to an aircraft production facility in Voronezh as well as providing air support to ground troops transferring to the Steppe Front, shooting down seven Junkers Ju 88 and three Focke-Wulf 190s in the process; four of the Ju 88 shot down during that time were shot down on 19 March 1943 when a group of 42 bombers approached the facility but turned around after having heavy anti-aircraft fire from Raisa Surnachevskaya and Tamara Pamyatnykh followed by an attempted aerial ramming.
- September to November 1943 – the unit saw heavy combat in the battle of the Kursk Bulge; all of the structures the regiment was assigned to defend survived German bombing attempts.
- November 1943 to March 1944 – the unit was based in Kiev to protect Soviet soldiers crossing the Dnieper, shooting down six enemy aircraft in the process.
- March to September 1944 – the regiment saw fifteen aerial battles (seven during the day and eight at night) while protecting portions of a railroad near Zhitomir, shooting down two Ju 88 and one Heinkel-177.
- September 1944 to February 1945 – the regiment was assigned to protecting industrial cities, bridges, and railway junctions in the Dniester area of the 2nd Ukrainian Front.
- February to July 1945 – the regiment was relocated to Hungary and fought over Budapest near the Danube and industrialized areas.
- 20 July 1945 – All enlisted soldiers and non-commissioned officers of the regiment were demobilized. Commissioned officers were relocated to Vienna and later to Romania.
- November 1945 – All female officers and most male officers were demobilized; Aleksander Gridnev, the regimental commander, transferred to the 39th Guards Fighter Aviation Regiment.

In total the unit executed 2,073 combat sorties, fought directly in 125 air battles, and shot down 19 enemy aircraft.

== Notable members ==
- Lydia Litvyak – Hero of the Soviet Union, flying ace and most successful female fighter pilot of World War II.
- Yekaterina Budanova – Hero of the Russian Federation, credited as flying ace
- Olga Yamshchikova – became test pilot after the war
- Valeriya Khomyakova – first woman to shoot down an enemy aircraft at night
- Zuleykha Seyidmammadova – first Azerbaijani woman to fly in combat
- Raisa Belyaeva – flew a fighter as an escort for Nikita Khrushchev in the Battle of Stalingrad.
- Tamara Pamyatnykh – attempted an aerial ramming, but the wing of her plane was damaged before she could ram
- Antonina Lebedeva – went on to fly in several predominantly male aviation regiments
- Mariya Kuznetsova – survived Battle of Stalingrad
- Klavdiya Nechaeva – killed in action protecting her squadron commander

== In culture ==
- A former member of the 586th is depicted in the film Wings (1966), struggling to adapt to a dull civilian life as a schoolteacher. (Her former unit is not named in the film, but footage of a Yakovlev Yak-9 is shown, and no other female unit flew Yakovlevs.)
