= Olga Yamshchikova =

Soviet fighter pilot squadron commander

- Ольга Ямщикова
- Born: 6 June [O.S. 24 May] 1914
- Died: 31 July 1982 (aged 68)
- Military career
- Allegiance: Soviet Union
- Branch: Soviet Air Force
- Rank: Colonel
- Unit: 586th Fighter Aviation Regiment
- Awards: Order of the Red Banner of Labour; Order of the Patriotic War 1st Class

External image
- Grave

Olga Nikolaevna Yamshchikova (Russian: Ольга Николаевна Ямщикова; 1914–1982) was a Soviet fighter pilot squadron commander during World War II who became a test pilot after the war; she has been credited with as many as three shootdowns in World War II. During her postwar aviation career she became the first woman to fly the MiG-19.

== Awards ==
- Order of the Red Banner of Labour (1960)
- Order of the Patriotic War 1st class (1947)
- Two Order of the Red Star (1943 and 1953)
- campaign and jubilee medals

== See also ==
- Nina Rusakova
- Marina Popovich
