= Antonina Lebedeva =

Soviet female aviator

Antonina Vasilevna Lebedeva
- Native name: Антонина Васильевна Лебедева
- Born: 29 March 1916; Bakunin, Kuvshinovsky Uyezd, Tver Governorate, Russian Empire
- Died: 17 July 1943 (aged 27); Bolkhovsky District, Oryol Oblast, RSFSR, Soviet Union
- Allegiance: Soviet Union
- Service / branch: Soviet Air Force
- Rank: Junior lieutenant
- Battles / wars: World War II; Battle of Stalingrad; Velikie-Luki Offensive; Battle of Kursk †
- Awards: Medal "For Courage"

Antonina Vasilevna Lebedeva (Russian: Антонина Васильевна Лебедева; 29 March 1916 – 17 July 1943) was one of the few female fighter pilots to have made a shootdown, having shot down a Bf 109 in 1943 before she was killed in action during the Battle of Kursk.

== Early life ==
Lebedeva was born in 1916, in the village of Bakunin in the Kuvshinovsky District of the Tver Governorate, Russian Empire. Known as Tonya, her family later moved to Moscow, and after finishing school she became a Biology student at Moscow State University. Lebedeva was a member of the Dzerzhinsky flying club in Moscow, and worked her way up to instructor.

== World War II ==
In 1941, upon the German invasion of the Soviet Union which brought the Soviet Union into World War II, she joined the Soviet Air Force. Lebedeva joined 586th Fighter Aviation Regiment, an air defense regiment composed of all-female fighter pilots, and was assigned fight planes of the German Luftwaffe over the city of Saratov. After earning her fighter designation she was transferred to the 434th Fighter Aviation Regiment. From 10 September 1942, she participated in the Battle of Stalingrad defending the skies over Stalingrad until 3 October 1942, when she was transferred to participate in the upcoming Velikie-Luki Offensive. In December 1942, Lebedeva and her wingmate were both shot down shortly after having shot down a German plane, which she survived and quickly returned to fighting.

On 10 January 1943, Lebedeva was involved in a dogfight where she faced two German fighters alone, destroying one Bf 109, but her aircraft suffered serious damage in the process and she was forced to make an emergency landing while under attack, landing outside the airport on the fuselage of her aircraft. On 22 February 1943, Lebedeva was awarded the Order of the Patriotic War in the 2nd degree for her courage in battle, and by the time she received the medal had logged nearly 1,500 hours of flight time, having participated in three air battles and made 12 sortie runs. In early May 1943, Lebedeva was promoted to the rank of lieutenant, and on 9 May she was transferred to the 65th Guards Fighter Aviation Regiment to fight at the Bryansk front. On July 12, Lebedeva was sent to fight in the Battle of Kursk as part of a Soviet offensive.

=== Death ===
During an evening battle on 17 July 1943, while flying a combat mission with 3 other fighters, Lebedeva and her comrades were ambushed by a group of 30 German planes. Lebedeva and her comrades were quickly overwhelmed and shot down, went missing and were presumed dead.

In 1982, a group of school children from Oryol were investigating reports regarding the site of a crash in the village of Betovo in Bolhovsky District, Oryol Oblast, when they discovered the remains of a pilot, along with a parachute, pistol, knife and documents. While the aircraft concerned was initially thought to have belonged to the Normandy-Niemen Regiment (a French unit serving on the Eastern Front), the pilot's items recovered were proven to belong to Lebedeva, including her log book and medical card which bore her name. The serial number on the machine gun retrieved from the plane's wreckage was confirmed to belong to Lebedeva's plane at the time of her disappearance. The former commander of the 1st Guards Fighter Air Corps, Lieutenant-General Yevgeny Beletsky, attended the reburial service of Lebedeva, and brought confirmation from archival sources that it was there that Lebedeva's last departure for the combat mission.

Lebedeva's grave is now in the former sovkhoz (state farm) of Vyazovsky in Bolhovsky District, where a memorial obelisk was installed as a grave marker.
