= Lydia Litvyak =

Soviet flying ace (1921–1943)

- Лидия Владимировна Литвяк
- Litvyak, c. 1941–1943
- Born: 18 August 1921; Moscow, Russian SFSR
- Died: 1 August 1943 (aged 21) near Kozhevnia, Ukrainian SSR, Soviet Union
- Military career
- Allegiance: Soviet Union
- Branch: Soviet Air Force
- Service years: 1941–1943
- Rank: Senior lieutenant
- Nicknames: Lilya; "White Lily of Stalingrad"; "White Rose of Stalingrad"
- Units: 586th Fighter Aviation Regiment; 9th Guards Fighter Aviation Regiment; 73rd Guards Fighter Regiment
- Conflicts: World War II; Eastern Front †
- Awards: Hero of the Soviet Union (posthumous)

Lydia Vladimirovna Litvyak (Russian: Лидия Владимировна Литвяк; 18 August 1921 – 1 August 1943), also known as Lilya, was a fighter pilot in the Soviet Air Force during World War II. Historians' estimates for her total victories range from thirteen to fourteen solo victories and four to five shared kills in her 66 combat sorties. In about two years of operations, she was the first female fighter pilot to shoot down an enemy aircraft, the first of two female fighter pilots who have earned the title of fighter ace and the holder of the record for the greatest number of kills by a female fighter pilot. She was shot down near Orel during the Battle of Kursk as she attacked a formation of German aircraft.

== Early life ==
Lydia Litvyak was born in Moscow into a Russian family. Her mother Anna Vasilievna Litvyak was a shop assistant; her father Vladimir Leontievich Litvyak (1892–1937) worked as a railwayman, train driver and clerk. During the Great Purge, her father was arrested as an "enemy of the people" and disappeared. Lydia became interested in aviation at an early age. At 14, she enrolled in a flying club. She performed her first solo flight at 15, and later graduated from the Kherson military flying school. She became a flight instructor at Kalinin Airclub, and by the time the German–Soviet war broke out, had already trained 45 pilots.

== World War II ==
=== Women's regiment ===
After the German attack on the Soviet Union in June 1941, Litvyak tried to join a military aviation unit, but was turned down because of lack of experience. After deliberately exaggerating her pre-war flight time by 100 hours, she joined the all-female 586th Fighter Aviation Regiment of the Air Defense Force, which was formed by Marina Raskova. She trained there on the Yakovlev Yak-1 aircraft.

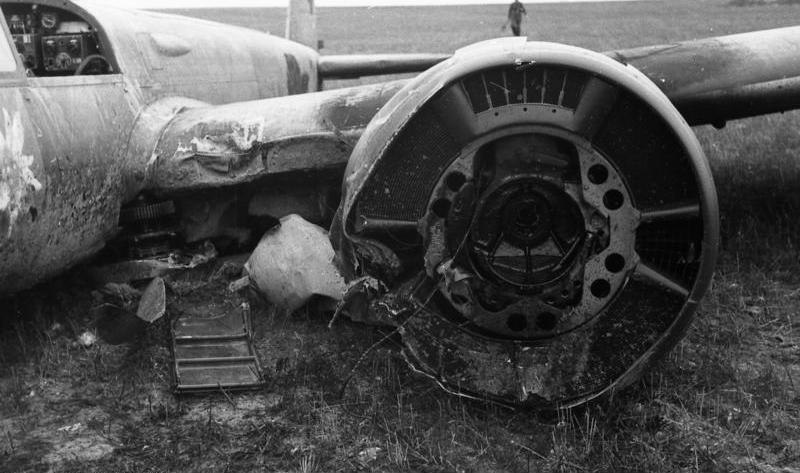
A wrecked Junkers Ju 88: Litvyak's very first kill was an aircraft of this type

=== Men's regiment ===
Litvyak flew her first combat flights in the summer of 1942 over Saratov. In September, she was assigned to the 437th Fighter Aviation Regiment, a men's regiment fighting over Stalingrad. On 10 September she moved along with Yekaterina Budanova, Mariya Kuznetsova and Raisa Belyaeva, the commander of the group, and accompanying female ground crew, to the regiment airfield, at Verkhnaia Akhtuba, on the east bank of the Volga river. But when they arrived, the base was empty and under attack, so they soon moved to Srednaia Akhtuba. Here, flying a Yak-1 carrying the number "32" on the fuselage, she achieved considerable success. Boris Yeremin (later lieutenant general of aviation), a regimental commander in the division to which she and Budanova were assigned, saw her as "a very aggressive person" and "a born fighter pilot".

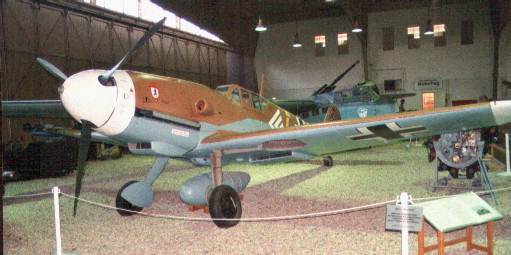
Restored Messerschmitt Bf 109G: The first fighter shot down by Litvyak was an aircraft of this type, flown by Luftwaffe ace Unteroffizier Erwin Meier.

In the 437th Fighter Aviation Regiment, Litvyak scored her first two kills on 13 September, three days after her arrival and on her third mission to cover Stalingrad, becoming the first woman fighter pilot to shoot down an enemy aircraft. That day, four Yak-1s with Major S. Danilov in the lead attacked a formation of Junkers Ju 88s escorted by Messerschmitt Bf 109s. Her first kill was a Ju 88 which fell in flames from the sky after several bursts. Then she shot down a Bf 109 G-2 "Gustav" on the tail of her squadron commander, Belyaeva. The Bf 109 was piloted by a decorated pilot from the 4th Air Fleet, the 11-victory ace Staff Sergeant Erwin Meier of the 2nd Staffel of Jagdgeschwader 53. Meier parachuted from his aircraft, was captured by Soviet troops, and asked to see the Russian ace who had shot him down. When he was taken to Litvyak, he thought he was being made the butt of a Soviet joke. It was not until Litvyak described each move of the fight to him in perfect detail that he knew he had been shot down by a woman pilot. But according to other authors, the first air victory by a female pilot was achieved by Lieutenant Valeriya Khomyakova of the 586th Regiment when she shot down the Ju 88 flown by Oblt. Gerhard Maak of 7./KG76 on the night of 24 September 1942.

On 14 September, according to some authors, Litvyak shot down another Bf 109. Her ill-fated opponent was probably Knight's Cross holder and 71-kill experte Lt. Hans Fuss (Adj.II./JG-3), injured in aerial combat with a Yak-1 on 14 September 1942 in Stalingrad area, when his G-2 fuel tank was hit, his plane somersaulted during the landing when he ran out of fuel flying back to base. He was critically injured, lost one leg and died of his wounds 10 November 1942. On 27 September, Litvyak scored an air victory against a Ju 88, the gunner having shot up the regiment commander, Major M.S. Khovostnikov, possibly Ju 88A-4 "5K + LH", piloted by Iron Cross holder Oblt. Johann Wiesniewski, 2./KG 3, MIA with all crew members. Some historians credit it as her first kill.

=== Free hunter ===
Litvyak, Belyaeva, Budanova and Kuznetsova stayed in the 437th Regiment for a short time only, mainly because it was equipped with LaGG 3s rather than Yak-1s, that the women flew, and was lacking the facilities to service the latter. So the four women were moved to the 9th Guards Fighter Regiment. From October 1942 till January 1943, Litvyak and Budanova served, still in the Stalingrad area, with this famous unit, commanded by Lev Shestakov, Hero of Soviet Union.

In January 1943, the 9th was re-equipped with the Bell P-39 Airacobras and Litvyak and Budanova were moved to the 296th Fighter Regiment (later redesignated as the 73rd Guards Fighter Aviation Regiment) of Nikolai Baranov, of the 8th Air Army, so that they could still fly the Yaks. On 23 February, she was awarded the Order of the Red Star, made a junior lieutenant and selected to take part in the elite air tactic called okhotniki, or "free hunter", where pairs of experienced pilots searched for targets on their own initiative. Twice, she was forced to land due to battle damage. On 22 March she was wounded for the first time. That day she was flying as part of a group of six Yak fighters when they attacked a dozen Ju 88s. Litvyak shot down one of the bombers but was in turn attacked and wounded by the escorting Bf 109s. She managed to shoot down a Messerschmitt and to return to her airfield and land her plane, but was in severe pain and losing blood. While in 73rd Regiment, she often flew as wingman of Captain Aleksey Solomatin, a flying ace with a claimed total of 39 victories (22 shared). On 21 May, while training a new flyer, Solomatin was killed in front of the entire regiment in Pavlonka when he flew into the ground. Litvyak was devastated by the crash and wrote a letter to her mother describing how she realized only after Solomatin's death that she had loved him.

Senior Sergeant Inna Pasportnikova, Litvyak's mechanic during the time she flew with the men's regiment, reported in 1990 that after Solomatin's death, Litvyak wanted nothing but to fly combat missions, and she fought desperately.

Litvyak scored against a difficult target on 31 May 1943: an artillery observation balloon manned by a German officer. German artillery was aided in targeting by reports from the observation post on the balloon. The elimination of the balloon had been attempted by other Soviet airmen but all had been driven away by a dense protective belt of anti-aircraft fire defending the balloon. Litvyak volunteered to take out the balloon but was turned down. She insisted and described for her commander her plan: she would attack it from the rear after flying in a wide circle around the perimeter of the battleground and over German-held territory. The tactic worked—the hydrogen-filled balloon caught fire under her stream of tracer bullets and was destroyed.

On 13 June 1943, Litvyak was appointed flight commander of the 3rd Aviation Squadron within 73rd Guards Fighter Aviation Regiment.

Litvyak made an additional kill on 16 July 1943. That day, six Yaks encountered 30 German Ju 88 bombers with six escorts. The female ace downed a bomber and shared a victory with a comrade, but her fighter was hit and she had to make a belly landing. She was wounded again but refused to take medical leave. She shot down one Bf 109 on 19 July 1943, probably 6-kill ace Uffz. Helmuth Schirra, 4./JG-3 (MIA, Luhansk area). Another Bf 109 kill followed two days later on 21 July 1943, possibly Bf 109G-6 of Iron Cross holder and 28-kill experte Lt. Hermann Schuster 4./JG-3(KIA, near Pervomaysk, Luhansk area).

=== Last mission ===
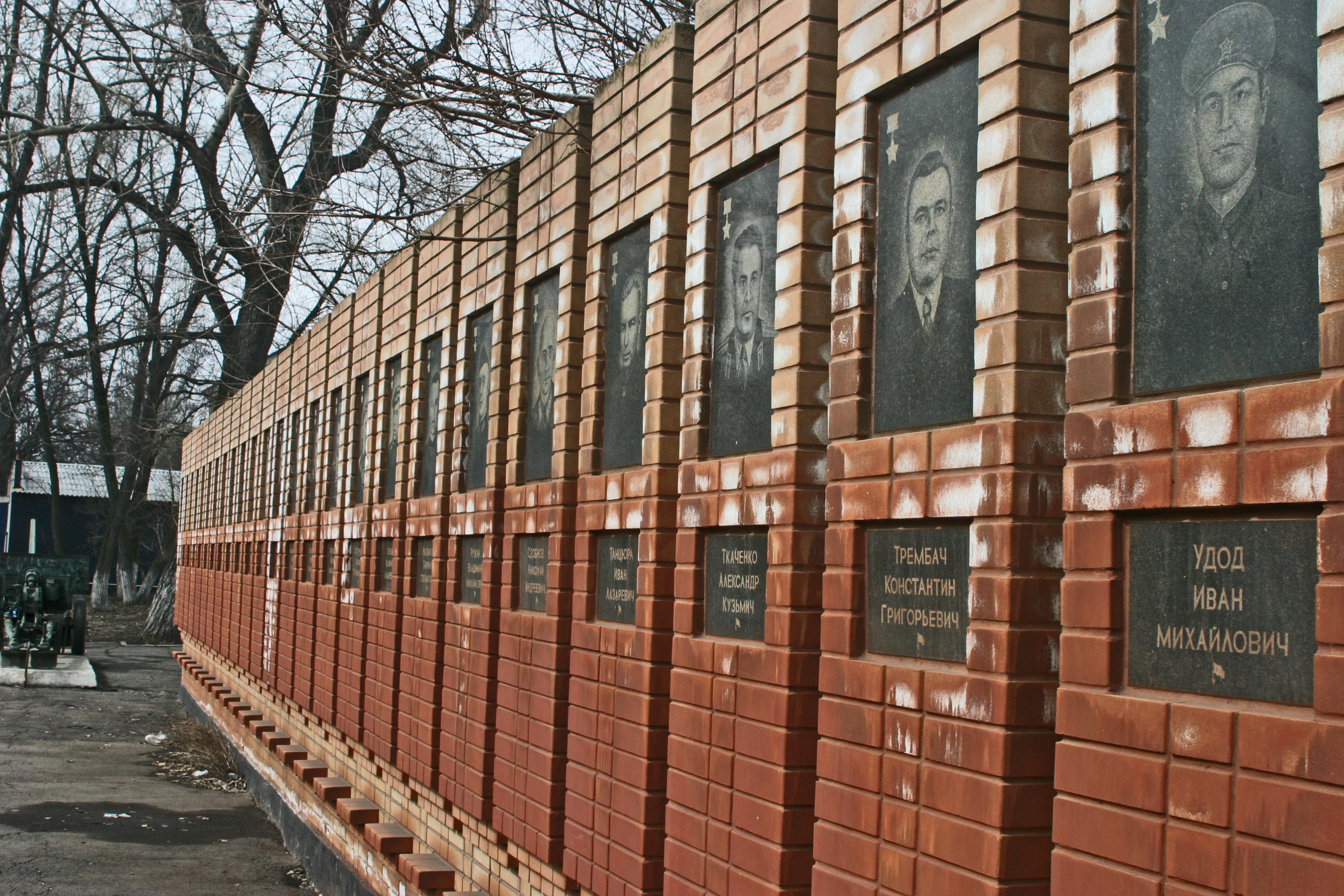
Krasnyi Luch wall of Honor to the Heroes of War and Labor. Litvyak took off for her last mission from an airfield close to this city, where a museum dedicated to her is located.

On 1 August 1943, Litvyak did not come back to her base at Krasnyy Luch on the Mius-Front. It was her fourth sortie of the day, escorting a flight of Ilyushin Il-2 ground-attack aircraft. As the Soviets were returning to base, a pair of Bf 109 fighters dove on Litvyak while she was attacking a large group of German bombers. Soviet pilot Ivan Borisenko recalled: “Lilya just didn’t see the Messerschmitt 109s flying cover for the German bombers. A pair of them dove on her and when she did see them she turned to meet them. Then they all disappeared behind a cloud.” Borisenko, involved in the dogfight, saw her the last time, through a gap in the clouds, her Yak-1 pouring smoke and pursued by as many as eight Bf 109s.

Borisenko descended to see if he could find her. No parachute was seen, and no explosion. She never returned from the mission. Litvyak was 21 years old. Soviet authorities suspected that she might have been captured, a possibility that prevented them from awarding her the title of Hero of the Soviet Union.

One of two German pilots is believed to have shot down Litvyak: Iron Cross holder and 30-kill experte Fw. Hans-Jörg Merkle of 1./JG.52, or Knight's Cross holder and future 99-kill experte Lt Hans Schleef of 7./JG 3. Merkle is the only pilot that claimed a Yak-1 near Dmitryevka on 1 August 1943, his 30th victory. (Dmitrijewka is where Litvyak was last seen and was reportedly buried.) This occurred before being rammed and killed by his own victim (the Luftwaffe combat report of the collision was 3 km east of Dmitrievka). Schleef claimed a LaGG-3 (often confused in combat with Yak-1s by German pilots) kill on the same day, in the southern Ukraine area where Litvyak's aircraft was finally found.

== Recognition ==
In an attempt to prove that Litvyak had not been taken captive, Pasportnikova embarked on a 36-year search for the Yakovlev Yak-1 crash site assisted by the public and the media. For three years, she was joined by relatives, who together combed the most likely areas with a metal detector. In 1979, after uncovering more than 90 other crash sites, 30 aircraft and many lost pilots killed in action, "the searchers discovered that an unidentified woman pilot had been buried in the village of Dmitrievka... in Shakhterski district." It was then assumed that it was Litvyak and that she had been killed in action after sustaining a mortal head wound. Pasportnikova said that a special commission was formed to inspect the exhumed body, and it concluded the remains were those of Litvyak.

On 6 May 1990, Soviet President Mikhail Gorbachev posthumously awarded her the title Hero of the Soviet Union. Her final rank was senior lieutenant, as was documented in all Moscow newspapers of that date.

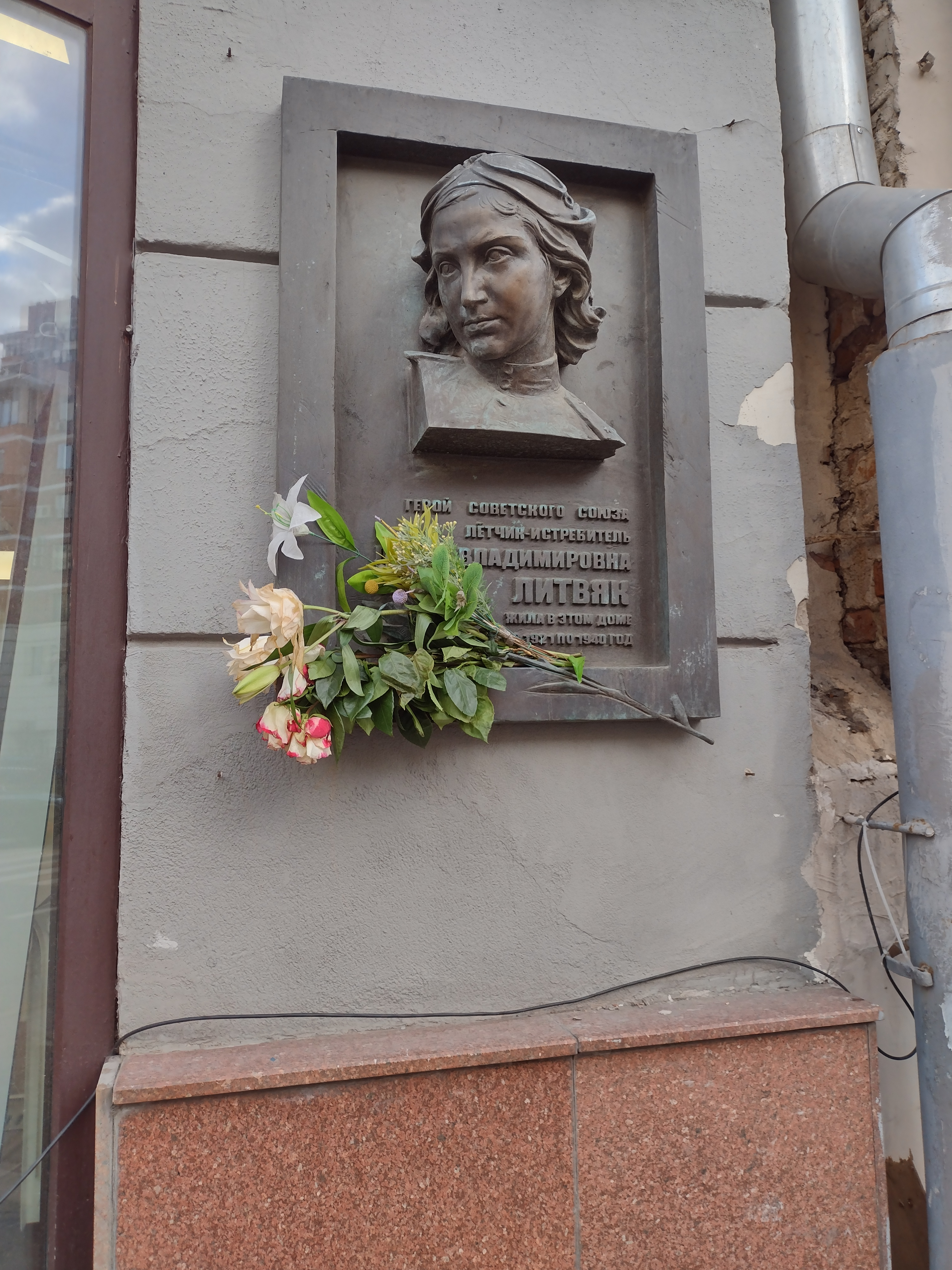
Memorial plaque in Moscow

== Controversies ==
=== Manner of death ===
Arguments have been published that dispute the official version of Litvyak's death. Although Yekaterina Valentina Vaschenko, the curator of the Litvyak museum in Krasnyi Luch has stated that the body was disinterred and examined by forensic specialists, who determined that it was indeed Litvyak, Kazimiera Janina Cottam claims, on the basis of evidence provided by Yekaterina Polunina, chief mechanic and archivist of the 586th Fighter Regiment in which Litvyak initially served, that the body was never exhumed and that verification was limited to comparison of a number of reports.

Cottam, an author and researcher focusing on Soviet women in the military, concludes that Litvyak made a belly-landing in her stricken aircraft, was captured and was taken to a prisoner of war camp. In her book published in 2004, Polunina lists evidence that led her to conclude that Litvyak was pulled from the downed aircraft by German troops and held prisoner for some time.

Gian Piero Milanetti, the author of a recent book on Soviet aviatrixes, wrote that an airwoman parachuted in the approximate location of the alleged crash landing of Litvyak's aircraft. No other Soviet airwomen operated in that area and so Milanetti believes the pilot was Litvyak, probably captured by the enemy. The Russian aviation historian Anatoly Plyac, a former KGB major, told Milanetti: "Litvyak survived and was taken prisoner..."

A television broadcast from Switzerland was seen in 2000 by Raspopova, a veteran of the women's night bomber regiment. It featured a former Soviet woman fighter pilot who Raspopova thought may have been Litvyak. This veteran was wounded twice. Married outside of the Soviet Union, she had three children. Raspopova promptly told Polunina what she inferred from the Swiss broadcast.

=== Number of kills ===
There is no consensus among historians about the number of aerial victories scored by Litvyak. Russian historians Andrey Simonov and Svetlana Chudinova were able to confirm five solo and three team shootdowns of enemy aircraft plus the destruction of the air balloon, with archival documents. Various other tallies are attributed to her, including eleven solo and three shared plus the balloon, as well as eight individual and four team. Anne Noggle credits her with twelve individual and two team shootdowns. Pasportnikova stated in 1990 that the tally was eleven solo kills plus the balloon, and an additional three shared. Polunina has written that the kills of famous Soviet pilots, including those of Litvyak and Budanova, were often inflated; and that Litvyak should be credited with five solo aircraft kills and two group kills, including the observation balloon.

== Character and private life ==
Litvyak displayed a rebellious and romantic character. Returning from a successful mission, she would "buzz" the aerodrome and then indulge in unauthorised aerobatics, knowing that it enraged her commander.

Litvyak could also be superstitious, as Pasportnikova testified:

She never believed that she was invincible. She believed that some pilots had luck on their side and others didn't. She firmly believed that, if you survived the first missions, the more you flew and the more experience you got your chances of making it would increase. But you had to have luck on your side.

Despite the predominantly male environment in which she found herself, she never renounced her femininity and she carried on bleaching her hair blonde, sending her friend Inna Pasportnikova to the hospital to fetch hydrogen peroxide for her. She would fashion scarves from parachute material, dyeing the small pieces in different colors and stitching them together. She would not hide her love of flowers, which she picked at every available occasion, favoring red roses, and would fashion these into bouquets and keep them in the cockpit. These were promptly discarded by the male pilots who shared her aircraft.

Her comrade Solomatin is believed to have been her fiancé, and after his death, she wrote to her mother:

You see, he was not my type, but his insistence and his love for me convinced me to love him... and now, it seems I will never meet someone like him ever again.

Litvyak was called the "White Lily of Stalingrad" in Soviet press releases; the white lily flower may be translated from Russian as Madonna lily. She has also been called the "White Rose of Stalingrad" in Europe and North America since reports of her exploits were first published in English.

== Awards ==
- Hero of the Soviet Union (5 May 1990)
- Order of Lenin (5 May 1990)
- Order of the Red Banner (22 July 1943)
- Order of the Red Star (17 February 1943)
- Order of the Patriotic War 1st class (10 September 1943)

== Aerial victories (credited) ==
- 13 September 1942
  - two solo, a series Junkers Ju 88 and a Messerschmitt Bf 109 (of E. Maier.) Another source suggests a Heinkel He 111 instead of a Ju 88.
- 14 September 1942
  - one solo, a Bf 109 (according to historian Hans D. Seidl, it was a kill shared with Yekaterina Budanova)
- 27 September 1942
  - one solo, a Junkers Ju 88
  - one shared, with Raisa Belyaeva, a Messerschmitt Bf 109
- 11 February 1943
  - one solo, a Junkers Ju 87
  - one shared, with Alexei Solomatin, a Focke-Wulf Fw 190
- 22 March 1943
  - two solo, a Messerschmitt Bf 109 and a Junkers Ju 88
- 5 May 1943
  - one solo, a Messerschmitt Bf 109
- 7 May 1943
  - one solo, a Messerschmitt Bf 109
- 31 May 1943
  - one solo, an artillery observation balloon
- 16 July 1943
  - one solo, Messerschmitt Bf 109. One source claims the victim aircraft had an "Ace of Spades" card painted on the fuselage. Another source claims that this kill was a bomber.
  - one shared (According to another source, the shared kill was a Bf 109 while the solo was a Ju 88)
- 19 July 1943
  - one solo, a Messerschmitt Bf 109
- 21 July 1943
  - one a Messerschmitt Bf 109
- 1 August 1943
  - one solo, a Messerschmitt Bf 109,
  - one shared, a Messerschmitt Bf 109

The following table summarizes Litvyak's credited victories and their fates:

Date (dd.mm.yyyy)	Soviet Unit	Aircraft flown	Enemy Aircraft	Pilot & Fate	Axis Unit
13 September 1942	437 IAP	Yak-1 "White 02"	Ju.88		Luftwaffe (**)
13 September 1942	437 IAP	Yak-1 "White 02"	Bf 109G-2 W.Nr.13556 black 8	Obfw. Erwin Meier - POW (11-kill ace)	2./JG 53
14 September 1942	437 IAP	Yak-1 "White 02"	Bf 109	Knight's Cross holder and 71-kill experte Lt. Hans Fuß (Adj.II./JG-3)	Luftwaffe (**)
27 September 1942	437 IAP	Yak-1 "White 02"	Ju.88A-4 W.Nr.3517	Unknown (80% dam, w/o)	5./KG 76
27 September 1942	437 IAP	Yak-1 "White 02"	Bf 109G-2 W.Nr.14221	Horst Loose - KIA (shared)	4./JG 52
11 February 1943	296 IAP	Yak-1 "Red 32"	Fw.190	(shared)	Luftwaffe (**)
11 February 1943	296 IAP	Yak-1 "Red 32"	Ju 87D-3 W.Nr.2948	Gerhard Weber + gunner - MIAs	5./StG 77
22 March 1943	296 IAP	Yak-1 "Yellow 44"	Bf 109G-4 "BH+XB"	Lt. Franz Müller	9./JG 3
22 March 1943	296 IAP	Yak-1 "Yellow 44"	Ju.88		Luftwaffe (**)
5 May 1943	73 GIAP	Yak-1 "Yellow 44"	Bf 109		Luftwaffe (**)
7 May 1943	73 GIAP	Yak-1 "Yellow 44"	Bf 109		Luftwaffe (**)
31 May 1943	73 GIAP	Yak-1	Observation balloon		
16 July 1943	73 GIAP	Yak-1b "White 23"	Bf 109G-6 W.Nr.15204	Unknown (20% dam)	5./JG 3
16 July 1943	73 GIAP	Yak-1b "White 23"	Bf 109G-? W.Nr.?		
19 July 1943	73 GIAP	Yak-1b "White 23"	Bf 109G-6 W.Nr.20005	Unknown (40% dam)	5./JG 3
21 July 1943	73 GIAP	Yak-1b "White 23"	Bf 109		Luftwaffe (**)
1 August 1943	73 GIAP	Yak-1b "White 23"	Bf 109G-6 W.Nr.15852	Unknown (50% dam)	2./JG 52
1 August 1943	73 GIAP	Yak-1b "White 23"	Bf 109G-6 W.Nr.20423 white 3	Fw. Hans-Jörg Merkle - KIA (30-kill ace)(shared)	1./JG 52

== See also ==
- List of female Heroes of the Soviet Union
- Yekaterina Budanova, the only other woman credited as a flying ace.
