= Raisa Belyaeva =

Russian female fighter pilots

Raisa Vasilyevna Belyayeva
- Раиса Васильевна Беляева
- Born: 25 December 1912; Kirov, Kirov Oblast
- Died: 19 July 1943 (aged 30)
- Military career
- Allegiance: Soviet Union
- Branch: Soviet Air Forces
- Service years: 1941–1943
- Nickname: Raya
- Units: 586th Fighter Aviation Regiment; 437th Fighter Aviation Regiment
- Conflicts: World War II

Raisa Vasilyevna Belyayeva (Russian: Раиса Васильевна Беляева; 25 December 1912 – 19 July 1943) was one of the first Russian female fighter pilots. She fought alongside Lydia Litvyak and was credited with up to three aerial victories. She died in combat, from causes unknown, in 1943.

== Early life ==
Belyayeva attended a technical institute for tanners in Kirov. After graduation she asked her old friend Olga Yamshchikova, a Leningrad flight instructor, to teach her to fly. Belyayeva soon proved herself an enthusiastic and indefatigable alumna. Before the war, she accumulated more than 1,000 hours of flight time and a hundred parachute jumps, instructing hundreds of parachutists. She also took part in many airshows over Tushino airfield, near Moscow.

== Military career ==
She took part in the Battle of Stalingrad and flew as an escort pilot for Nikita Khrushchev.

Belyaeya died in a crash on 19 July 1943.
