= 56th Academy Awards =

- Official poster
- Date: April 9, 1984
- Site: Dorothy Chandler Pavilion; Los Angeles, California, U.S.
- Hosted by: Johnny Carson
- Produced by: Jack Haley Jr.
- Directed by: Marty Pasetta

Highlights
- Best Picture: Terms of Endearment
- Most awards: Terms of Endearment (5)
- Most nominations: Terms of Endearment (11)

TV in the United States
- Network: ABC
- Duration: 3 hours, 45 minutes
- Ratings: 42.1 million 30.3% (Nielsen ratings)

The 56th Academy Awards ceremony, presented by the Academy of Motion Picture Arts and Sciences (AMPAS), honored the best films of 1983 and took place on April 9, 1984, at the Dorothy Chandler Pavilion in Los Angeles, beginning at 6:00 p.m. PST / 9:00 p.m. EST. During the ceremony, AMPAS presented Academy Awards (commonly referred to as Oscars) in 22 categories. The ceremony, televised in the United States by ABC, was produced by Jack Haley Jr. and directed by Marty Pasetta. Comedian and talk show emcee Johnny Carson hosted the show for the fifth time. He first presided over the 51st ceremony held in 1979 and last hosted the 54th ceremony held in 1982. Nine days earlier, in a ceremony held at The Beverly Hilton in Beverly Hills, California, on March 31, the Academy Scientific and Technical Awards were presented by hosts Joan Collins and Arnold Schwarzenegger.

Terms of Endearment won five awards, including Best Picture. Other winners included Fanny and Alexander and The Right Stuff with four awards, Tender Mercies with two awards, and Return of the Jedi, Boys and Girls, Flamenco at 5:15, Flashdance, He Makes Me Feel Like Dancin', Sundae in New York, The Year of Living Dangerously, and Yentl with one. The telecast garnered 42.1 million viewers in the United States.

== Winners and nominees ==
The nominees for the 56th Academy Awards were announced on February 16, 1984, by Academy president Gene Allen and actor Mickey Rooney. Terms of Endearment earned the most nominations with eleven; The Right Stuff came in second with eight. The winners were announced at the awards ceremony on April 9. James L. Brooks was the third writer-director-producer to win three Oscars for the same film. With four wins, Fanny and Alexander became the most awarded foreign language film in Academy Award history at the time. (Note: Crouching Tiger, Hidden Dragon (2000), Parasite (2019), and All Quiet on the Western Front (2022) have since equaled this record with four wins apiece.) Linda Hunt is the only person to win an Oscar for playing a character of the opposite sex. Best Original Song co-winner Irene Cara became the first black woman to win an Oscar in a non-acting category.

=== Awards ===
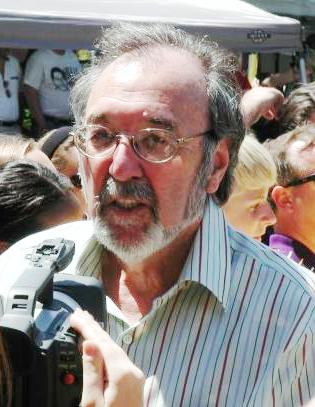
James L. Brooks, Best Picture, Best Director and Best Adapted Screenplay winner

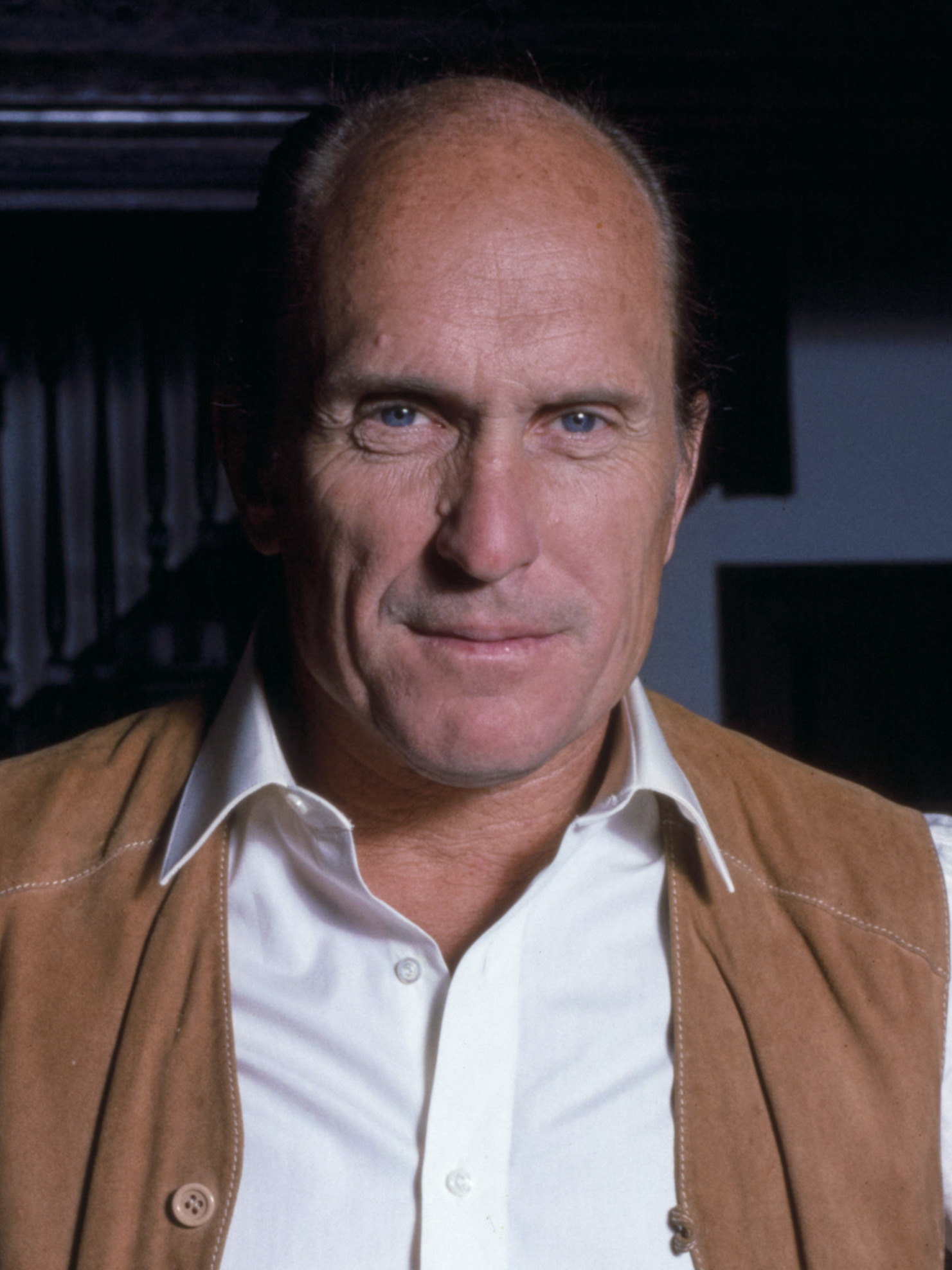
Robert Duvall, Best Actor winner

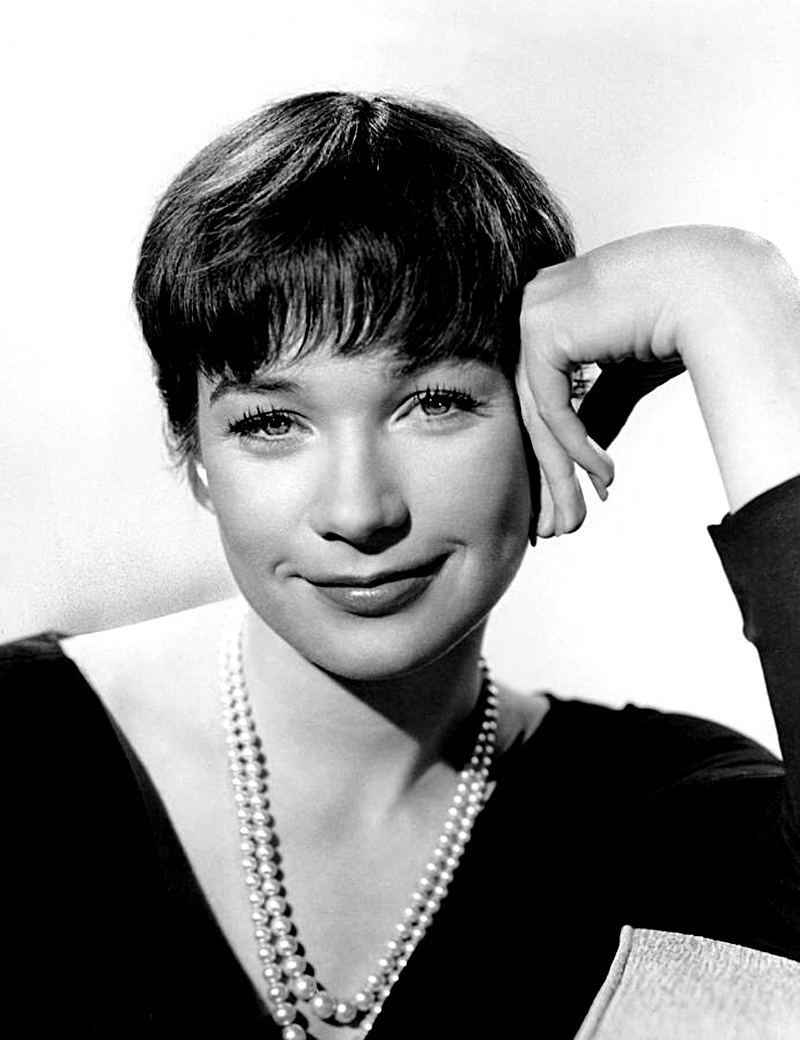
Shirley MacLaine, Best Actress winner

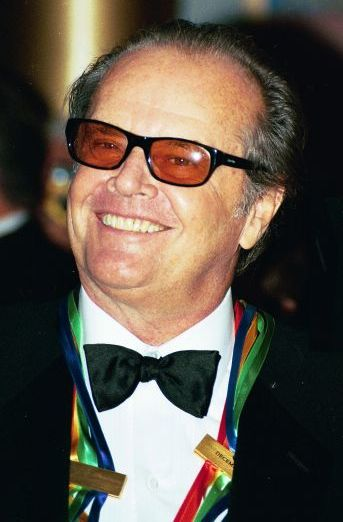
Jack Nicholson, Best Supporting Actor winner

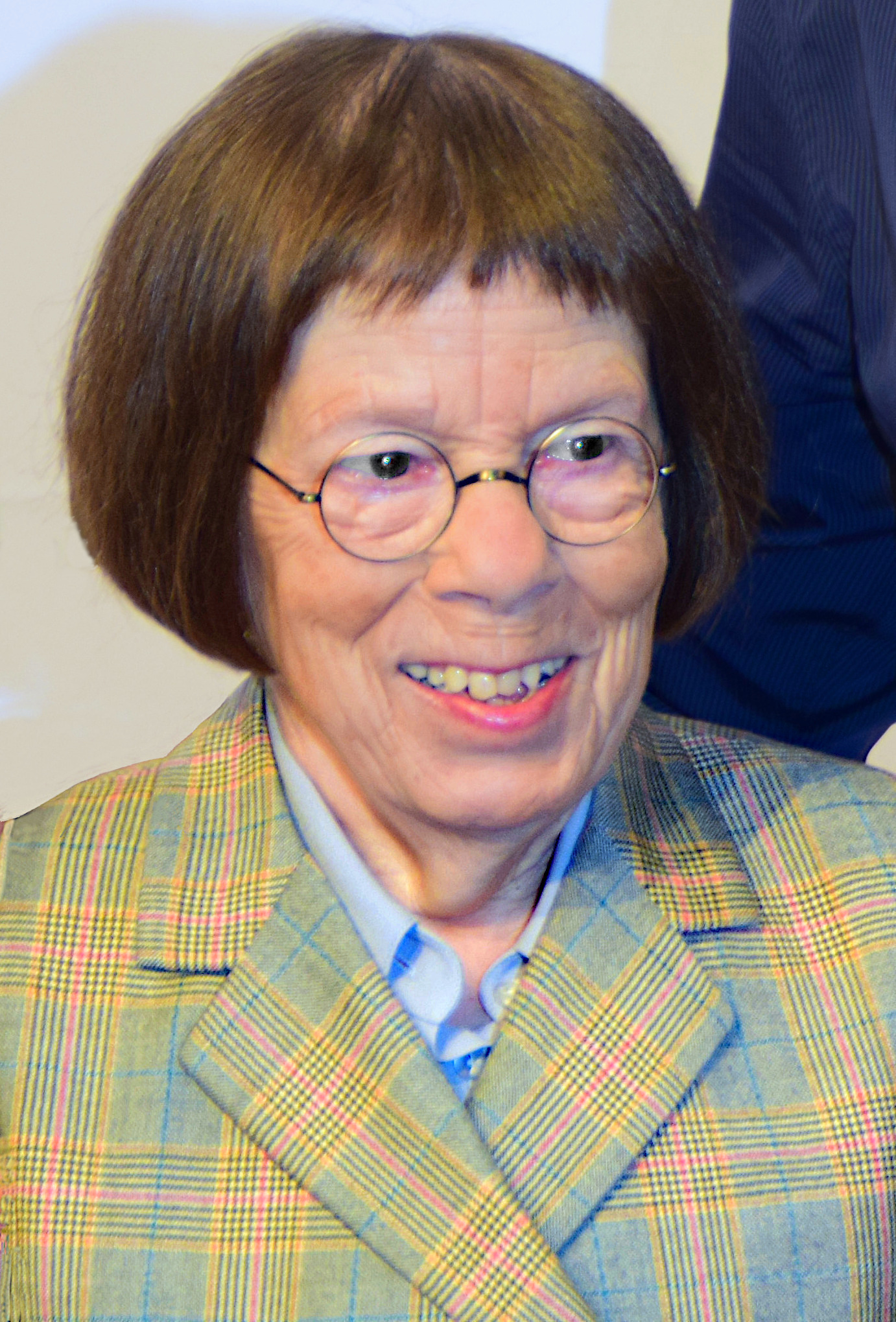
Linda Hunt, Best Supporting Actress winner

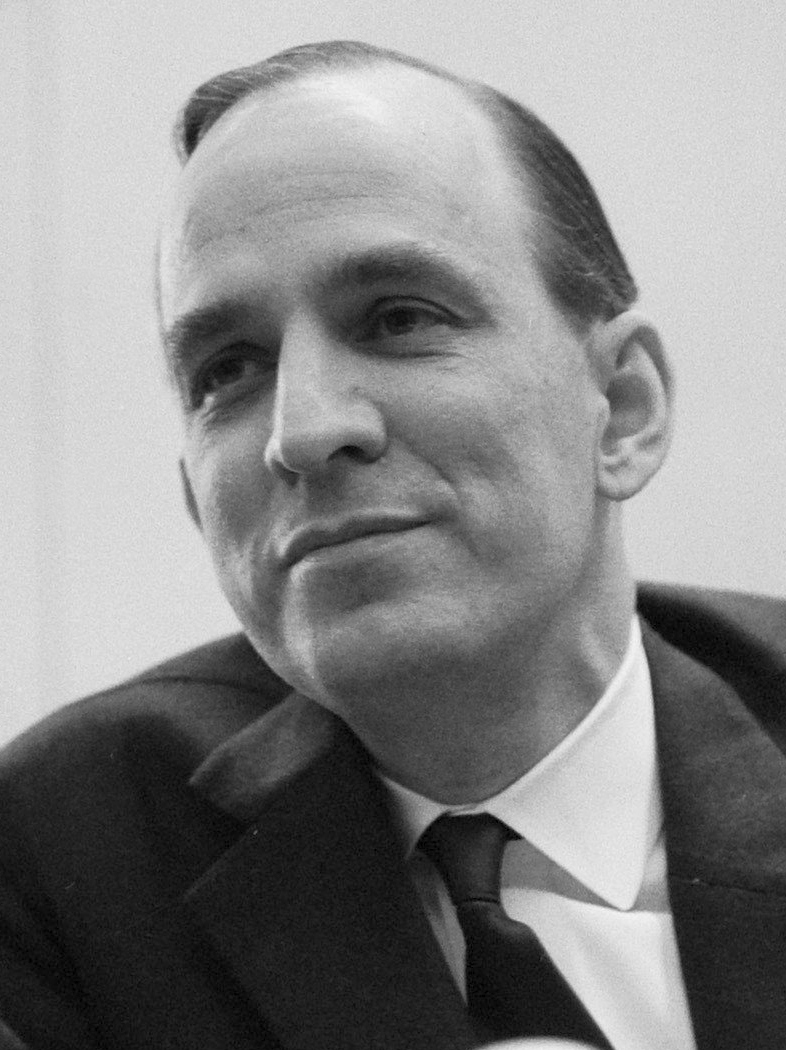
Ingmar Bergman, Best Foreign Language Film winner

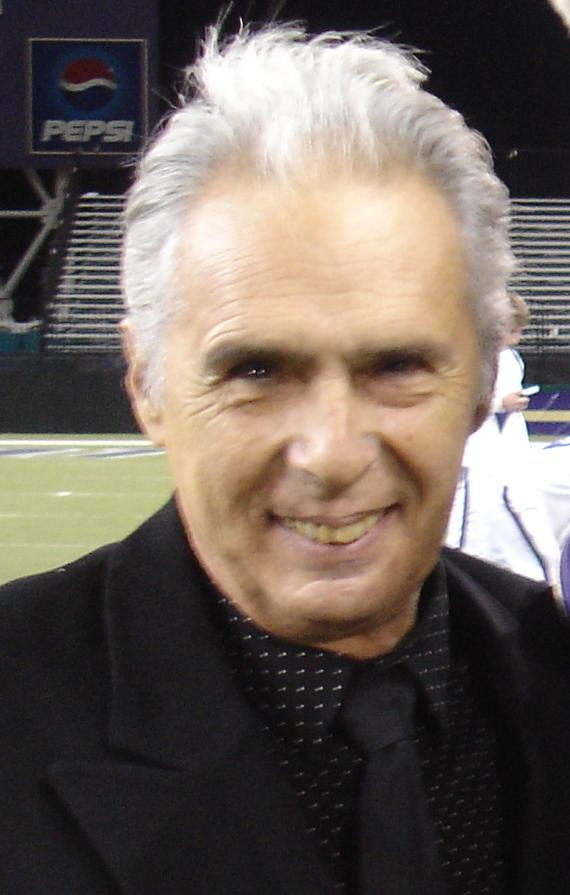
Bill Conti, Best Original Score winner

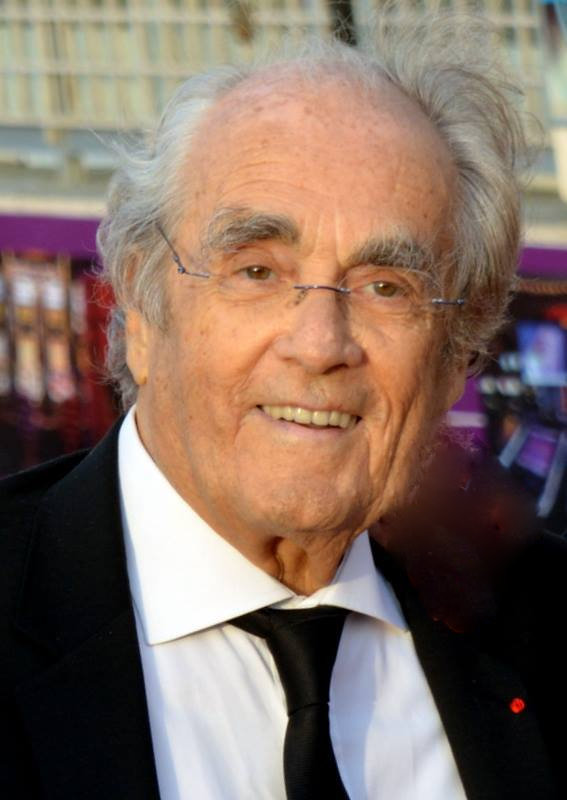
Michel Legrand, Best Original Song Score co-winner

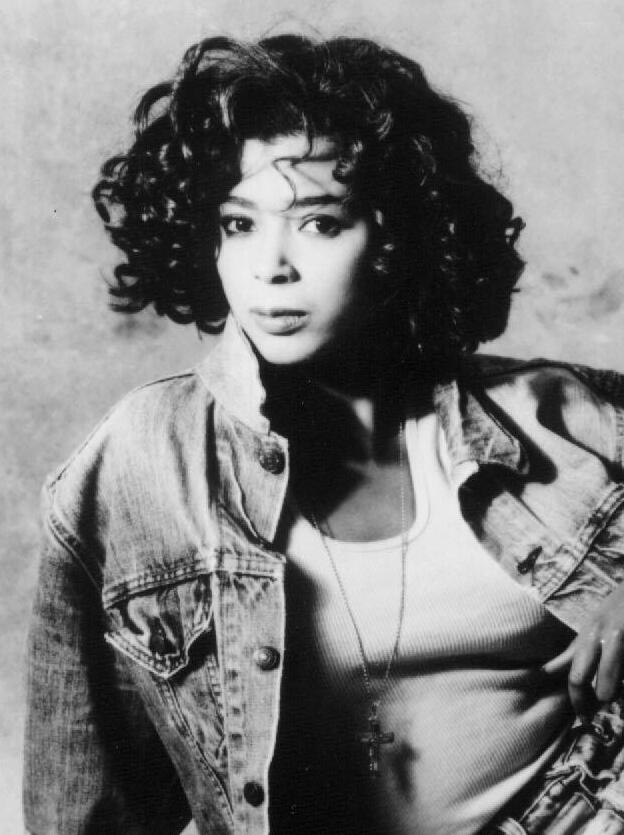
Irene Cara, Best Original Song co-winner

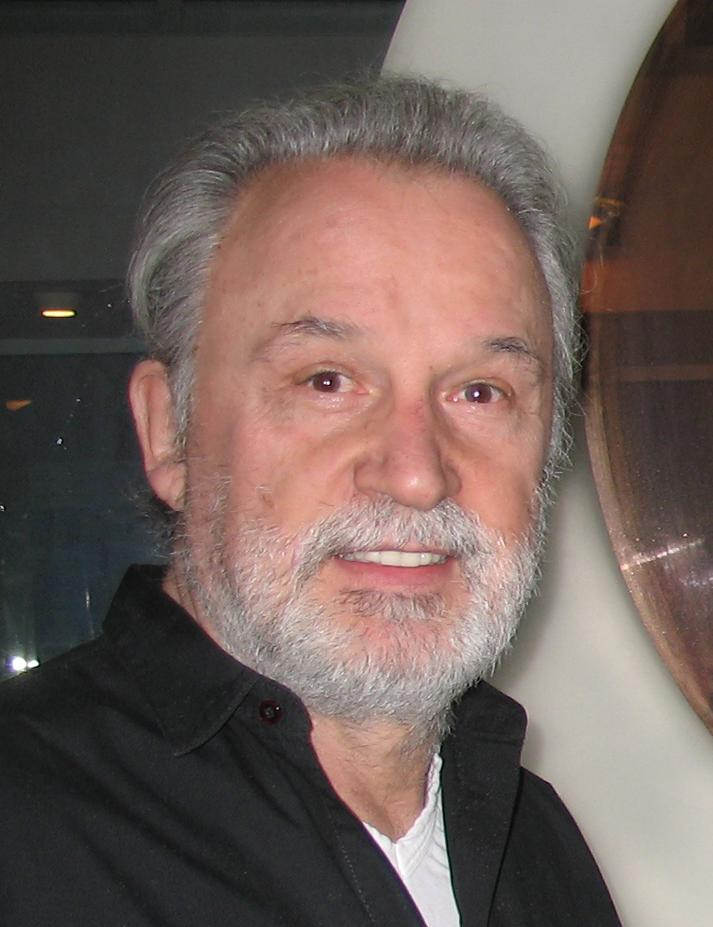
Giorgio Moroder, Best Original Song co-winner

Winners are listed first, highlighted in boldface and indicated with a double dagger (‡).

**Best Picture**: **Terms of Endearment – James L. Brooks, producer**‡; The Big Chill – Michael Shamberg, producer; The Dresser – Peter Yates, producer; The Right Stuff – Robert Chartoff and Irwin Winkler, producers; Tender Mercies – Philip S. Hobel, producer	**Best Directing**: **James L. Brooks – Terms of Endearment**‡; Peter Yates – The Dresser; Ingmar Bergman – Fanny and Alexander; Mike Nichols – Silkwood; Bruce Beresford – Tender Mercies
**Best Actor in a Leading Role**: **Robert Duvall – Tender Mercies as Mac Sledge**‡; Michael Caine – Educating Rita as Prof. Frank Bryant; Tom Conti – Reuben, Reuben as Gowan McGland; Tom Courtenay – The Dresser as Norman; Albert Finney – The Dresser as Sir	**Best Actress in a Leading Role**: **Shirley MacLaine – Terms of Endearment as Aurora Greenway**‡; Jane Alexander – Testament as Carol Wetherly; Meryl Streep – Silkwood as Karen Silkwood; Julie Walters – Educating Rita as Susan "Rita" White; Debra Winger – Terms of Endearment as Emma Greenway-Horton
**Best Actor in a Supporting Role**: **Jack Nicholson – Terms of Endearment as Garrett Breedlove**‡; Charles Durning – To Be or Not to Be as S.S. Colonel Erhardt; John Lithgow – Terms of Endearment as Sam Burns; Sam Shepard – The Right Stuff as Chuck Yeager; Rip Torn – Cross Creek as Marsh Turner	**Best Actress in a Supporting Role**: **Linda Hunt – The Year of Living Dangerously as Billy Kwan**‡; Cher – Silkwood as Dolly Pelliker; Glenn Close – The Big Chill as Sarah Cooper; Amy Irving – Yentl as Hadass Vishkower; Alfre Woodard – Cross Creek as Beatrice "Geechee"
**Best Writing (Screenplay Written Directly for the Screen)**: **Tender Mercies – Horton Foote**‡; The Big Chill – Lawrence Kasdan and Barbara Benedek; Fanny and Alexander – Ingmar Bergman; Silkwood – Nora Ephron and Alice Arlen; WarGames – Lawrence Lasker and Walter Parkes	**Best Writing (Screenplay Based on Material from Another Medium)**: **Terms of Endearment – James L. Brooks based on the novel by Larry McMurtry**‡; Betrayal – Harold Pinter based on his play; The Dresser – Ronald Harwood based on his play; Educating Rita – Willy Russell based on his play; Reuben, Reuben – Julius J. Epstein based on the play Spofford by Herman Shumlin
**Best Foreign Language Film**: **Fanny and Alexander (Sweden) in Swedish – directed by Ingmar Bergman**‡; Le Bal (Algeria) with no dialogue – directed by Ettore Scola; Carmen (Spain) in Spanish – directed by Carlos Saura; Entre Nous (France) in French – directed by Diane Kurys; Job's Revolt (Hungary) in Hungarian – directed by Imre Gyöngyössy and Barna Kabay	**Best Documentary (Feature)**: **He Makes Me Feel Like Dancin' – Emile Ardolino**‡; Children of Darkness – Richard Kotuk and Ara Chekmayan; First Contact – Bob Connolly and Robin Anderson; The Profession of Arms – Michael Bryans and Tina Viljoen; Seeing Red – James Klein and Julia Reichert
**Best Documentary (Short Subject)**: **Flamenco at 5:15 – Cynthia Scott and Adam Symansky**‡; In the Nuclear Shadow: What Can the Children Tell Us? – Vivienne Verdon-Roe and Eric Thiermann; Sewing Woman – Arthur Dong; Spaces: The Architecture of Paul Rudolph – Robert Eisenhardt; You Are Free (Ihr Zent Frei) – Dea Brokman and Ilene Landis	**Best Short Film (Live Action)**: **Boys and Girls – Janice L. Platt**‡; Goodie-Two-Shoes – Ian Emes; Overnight Sensation – Jon N. Bloom
**Best Short Film (Animated)**: **Sundae in New York – Jimmy Picker**‡; Mickey's Christmas Carol – Burny Mattinson; Sound of Sunshine – Sound of Rain – Eda Godel Hallinan	**Best Music (Original Score)**: **The Right Stuff – Bill Conti**‡; Cross Creek – Leonard Rosenman; Return of the Jedi – John Williams; Terms of Endearment – Michael Gore; Under Fire – Jerry Goldsmith
**Best Music (Original Song Score or Adaptation Score)**: **Yentl – Song Score by Michel Legrand and Alan and Marilyn Bergman**‡; The Sting II – Adaptation Score by Lalo Schifrin; Trading Places – Adaptation Score by Elmer Bernstein	**Best Music (Original Song)**: **"Flashdance... What a Feeling" from Flashdance – Music by Giorgio Moroder; Lyrics by Keith Forsey and Irene Cara**‡; "Maniac" from Flashdance – Music and Lyrics by Michael Sembello and Dennis Matkosky; "Over You" from Tender Mercies – Music and Lyrics by Austin Roberts and Bobby Hart; "Papa, Can You Hear Me?" from Yentl – Music by Michel Legrand; Lyrics by Alan and Marilyn Bergman; "The Way He Makes Me Feel" from Yentl – Music by Michel Legrand; Lyrics by Alan and Marilyn Bergman
**Best Sound**: **The Right Stuff – Mark Berger, Tom Scott, Randy Thom and David MacMillan**‡; Never Cry Wolf – Alan Splet, Todd Boekelheide, Randy Thom and David Parker; Return of the Jedi – Ben Burtt, Gary Summers, Randy Thom and Tony Dawe; Terms of Endearment – Donald O. Mitchell, Rick Kline, Kevin O'Connell and James R. Alexander; WarGames – Michael J. Kohut, Carlos Delarios, Aaron Rochin and Willie D. Burton	**Best Sound Effects Editing**: **The Right Stuff – Jay Boekelheide**‡; Return of the Jedi – Ben Burtt
**Best Art Direction**: **Fanny and Alexander – Art Direction and Set Decoration: Anna Asp**‡; Return of the Jedi – Art Direction: Norman Reynolds, Fred Hole and James L. Schoppe; Set Decoration: Michael D. Ford; The Right Stuff – Art Direction: Geoffrey Kirkland, Richard Lawrence, W. Stewart Campbell and Peter R. Romero; Set Decoration: Pat Pending and George R. Nelson; Terms of Endearment – Art Direction: Polly Platt and Harold Michelson; Set Decoration: Tom Pedigo and Anthony Mondello; Yentl – Art Direction: Roy Walker and Leslie Tomkins; Set Decoration: Tessa Davies	**Best Cinematography**: **Fanny and Alexander – Sven Nykvist**‡; Flashdance – Donald Peterman; The Right Stuff – Caleb Deschanel; WarGames – William A. Fraker; Zelig – Gordon Willis
**Best Costume Design**: **Fanny and Alexander – Marik Vos**‡; Cross Creek – Joe I. Tompkins; Heart Like a Wheel – William Ware Theiss; The Return of Martin Guerre – Anne-Marie Marchand; Zelig – Santo Loquasto	**Best Film Editing**: **The Right Stuff – Glenn Farr, Lisa Fruchtman, Tom Rolf, Stephen A. Rotter, and Douglas Stewart**‡; Blue Thunder – Frank Morriss and Edward M. Abroms; Flashdance – Bud S. Smith and Walt Mulconery; Silkwood – Sam O'Steen; Terms of Endearment – Richard Marks

=== Special Achievement Award (Visual Effects) ===
- Return of the Jedi – Richard Edlund, Dennis Muren, Ken Ralston and Phil Tippett.

=== Honorary Award ===
- To Hal Roach, in recognition of his unparalleled record of distinguished contributions to the motion picture art form.

=== Jean Hersholt Humanitarian Award ===
The award recognizes individuals whose humanitarian efforts have brought credit to the motion picture industry.

- M. J. Frankovich

=== Films with multiple nominations and awards ===
Films with multiple nominations
Nominations	Film
11	Terms of Endearment
8	The Right Stuff
6	Fanny and Alexander
5	The Dresser
5	Silkwood
5	Tender Mercies
5	Yentl
4	Cross Creek
4	Flashdance
4	Return of the Jedi (Note: Not counting the non-competitive Special Achievement Award for Return of the Jedi.)
3	The Big Chill
3	Educating Rita
3	WarGames
2	Reuben, Reuben
2	Zelig

Films with multiple wins
Awards	Film
5	Terms of Endearment
4	Fanny and Alexander
4	The Right Stuff
2	Tender Mercies

== Presenters and performers ==
The following individuals, listed in order of appearance, presented awards or performed musical numbers:

Presenters
Name(s)	Role
Hank Simms	Announcer of the 56th Annual Academy Awards
Gene Allen (AMPAS President)	Gave opening remarks welcoming guests to the awards ceremony
Sammy Davis Jr.	Introduced Shirley Temple
Shirley Temple	Speech about her winning Academy Juvenile Award at the 7th Academy Awards in 1935
Gene Allen (AMPAS President)	Gave opening remarks welcoming guests to the awards ceremony
Timothy Hutton; Mary Tyler Moore	Presenters of the award for Best Supporting Actor
Kevin Bacon; Daryl Hannah	Presenters of the award for Best Sound Effects Editing
Jane Alexander; Michael Caine	Presenters of the Best Animated Short Film and Best Live Action Short Film
Joan Collins; Arnold Schwarzenegger	Presenters of the segment of the Academy Scientific and Technical Awards
Robert Wise	Presenter of the award for Best Film Editing
Christie Brinkley; Michael Keaton	Presenters of the award for Best Sound
Anthony Franciosa; Joanna Pacuła	Presenters of the award for Best Cinematography
John Gavin; Jack Valenti	Presenters of the award for Best Foreign Language Film
Holly Palance; Jack Palance	Presenters of the awards for Best Documentary Short Subject and Best Documentary Feature
Tommy Chong; Cheech Marin	Presenters of the award for Best Visual Effects
Tommy Tune; Twiggy	Presenters of the award for Best Costume Design
Ricardo Montalbán; Jane Powell	Presenters of the award for Best Art Direction
Jennifer Beals; Matthew Broderick	Presenters of the award for Best Original Song
Ray Bolger; Gene Kelly	Presenters of the award for Best Original Score
Neil Diamond	Presenter of the award for Best Adapted Score
Dyan Cannon; Gene Hackman	Presenters of the award for Best Supporting Actress
Mel Gibson; Sissy Spacek	Presenters of the awards for Best Screenplay Written Directly for the Screen and Best Screenplay Based on Material from Another Medium
Frank Sinatra	Presenter of the Jean Hersholt Humanitarian Award to M. J. Frankovich
Richard Attenborough	Presenter of the award for Best Director
Jackie Cooper; George McFarland	Presenters of the Honorary Award to Hal Roach
Dolly Parton; Sylvester Stallone	Presenters of the award for Best Actor
Rock Hudson; Liza Minnelli	Presenters of the award for Best Actress
Frank Capra	Presenter of the award for Best Picture

Performers
Name	Role	Performed
Quincy Jones	Musical arranger Conductor	Orchestral
Irene Cara; National Dance Institute	Performers	"Flashdance... What a Feeling" from Flashdance
Herb Alpert; Lani Hall	Performers	"Maniac" from Flashdance
Mac Davis	Performer	"Over You" from Tender Mercies
Donna Summer	Performer	"Papa, Can You Hear Me?" from Yentl
Jennifer Holliday	Performer	"The Way He Makes Me Feel" from Yentl
Sammy Davis Jr. Liza Minnelli	Performers	"There's No Business Like Show Business"

== Ceremony information ==
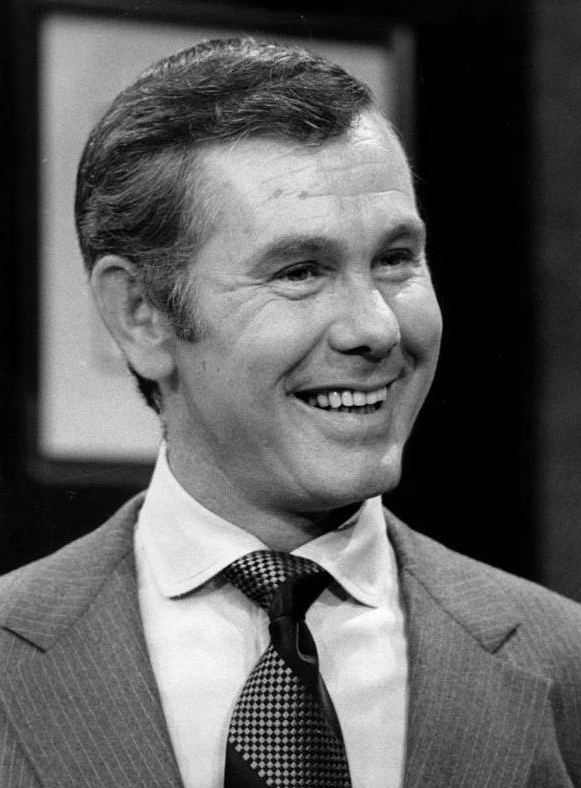
Johnny Carson hosted the 56th Academy Awards.

In September 1983, the Academy hired film producer Jack Haley Jr. to produce the telecast for the third time. "We are excited to have Jack Haley Jr. back on the Academy Awards program this year," said AMPAS President Gene Allen in a press release announcing the selection. "We know that his outstanding talents will ensure an innovative and entertaining approach to the presentation of the Oscar." That same month, it was announced that comedian and The Tonight Show Starring host Johnny Carson would preside over emceeing duties for the 1984 ceremony. Allen explained the decision to hire Carson, saying, "In past years, Johnny has been a vital element in the ever-increasing success and popularity of the Oscar presentations. We are extremely pleased that we will be able to draw once again on his wit and charisma to host this special entertainment event."

Several other people were involved with the production of the ceremony. Musician Quincy Jones served as musical director for the ceremony, where he conducted an overture performed by the orchestra at the beginning of the show. Former child actress Shirley Temple made a special appearance at the beginning of the telecast to discuss her memories of the 7th ceremony in 1935, where she received the Academy Juvenile Award. Singers Sammy Davis Jr. and Liza Minnelli performed "There's No Business Like Show Business" at the conclusion of the telecast. Marty Pasetta served as director for the telecast. Notably, this was the first Oscars ceremony where the voting rules were announced at the end of the telecast as opposed to the beginning.

=== Box office performance of Best Picture nominees ===
At the time of the nominations announcement on February 16, the combined gross of the five Best Picture nominees at the US box office was $151 million. Terms of Endearment was the highest earner among the Best Picture nominees, with $72.9 million in domestic box office receipts. The film was followed by The Big Chill ($52.5 million), The Right Stuff ($15.7 million), Tender Mercies ($8.44 million), and The Dresser ($562,623).

=== Critical reviews ===
Columnist Jerry Coffey from the Fort Worth Star-Telegram wrote, "Nothing that goes on during an Oscarcast is worth the tedium dumbly endured by the ever-gullible audience for moviedom's annual spasm of gross self-indulgence." Austin American-Statesman film critic Patrick Taggart commented, "By now after a week after the fact, it is a matter of record that Monday's Academy Awards show was without the dullest ever." He added, "The Oscar went to the predictable choice in every case, and not only were there no surprises among the awards, there weren't even any of those deliciously embarrassing moments that make live television what it is." Television critic Howard Rosenberg of the Los Angeles Times noted, "Be honest. This was not one of your more electrifying Academy Awards telecasts. The three hours and 40 minutes passed as swiftly as Barry Lyndon." He also said, "And the tradition of squeezing nearly all of the major, most glamorous awards into the last half hour again proved mistaken, ill conceived, and just plain dumb."

Other media outlets received the broadcast more positively. Television columnist John J. O'Connor of The New York Times wrote, "The tone of the proceedings was set and maintained by a spiritedly genial Mr. Carson." He also added that Carson was able to "provide with eternally boyish grace his typical comedy mix." The Baltimore Sun film critic Stephen Hunter quipped, "The show, one of the crispest and most swiftly-paced in recent years, enjoyed its greatest asset in the return of Johnny Carson to the role of master of ceremonies. Mr. Carson was in top form." Mike Duffy of the Detroit Free Press wrote, "Johnny Carson, once again the invaluable host, added some much needed spice with well-timed zingers. And I especially enjoyed Jack Nicholson's impersonation of a Blues Brother behind those black be-bopper shades."

=== Ratings and reception ===
The American telecast on ABC drew in an average of 42.1 million people over the length of the entire ceremony, which was a 21% decrease from the previous year's ceremony. Moreover, the show drew lower Nielsen ratings compared to the previous ceremony, with 30.3% of households watching with a 50% share. Nevertheless, the ceremony presentation received four nominations at the 36th Primetime Emmy Awards in August 1984. The following month, the ceremony won one of those nominations for Outstanding Art Direction for a Variety Program (Roy Christopher).

== See also ==
- List of submissions to the 56th Academy Awards for Best Foreign Language Film

== Bibliography ==
- Holden, Anthony (1993), Behind the Oscar: The Secret History of the Academy Awards, New York, New York, United States: Simon & Schuster, ISBN 978-0-6717-0129-1
- Jones, Arnold Wayne (1999). The Envelope, Please: The Ultimate Academy Awards Trivia Book. New York, New York, United States: HarperCollins. ISBN 978-0-3807-9944-2.
- Kinn, Gail; Piazza, Jim (2002), The Academy Awards: The Complete Unofficial History, New York, New York, United States: Workman Publishing Company, ISBN 978-1-5791-2396-3
- Osborne, Robert (1999), 70 Years of the Oscar: The Complete History of the Academy Awards, New York, New York, United States: Abbeville Publishing Group, ISBN 978-0-7892-1142-2
- Terrance, Vincent (2013), Television Specials: 5,336 Entertainment Programs, 1936–2012 (5 ed.), Jefferson, North Carolina, United States: Ballantine Books, McFarland & Company, ISBN 978-1-4766-1240-9, OCLC 844373010
- Wiley, Mason; Bona, Damien (1996), Inside Oscar: The Unofficial History of the Academy Awards (5 ed.), New York, New York, United States: Ballantine Books, ISBN 978-0-3454-0053-6, OCLC 779680732
