= 1984 Academy Awards =

1984 Academy Awards may refer to:

- 56th Academy Awards, the Academy Awards ceremony that took place in 1984
- 57th Academy Awards, the 1985 ceremony honoring the best in film for 1984
