= 1983 Academy Awards =

1983 Academy Awards may refer to:

- 55th Academy Awards, the Academy Awards ceremony that took place in 1983
- 56th Academy Awards, the 1984 ceremony honoring the best in film for 1983
