= Peter Romero =

Peter Romero may refer to:

- Peter F. Romero (fl. 1990s), American diplomat
- Peter R. Romero (1920–2010), art director
- Peter Romero (runner), winner of the 1971 4 × 880 yard relay at the NCAA Division I Indoor Track and Field Championships
