= Richard Lawrence =

Richard Lawrence may refer to:

- Richard Lawrence (failed assassin) (c. 1800–1861), attempted to assassinate U.S. President Andrew Jackson
- Richard Lawrence (bobsleigh) (1906–1974), American athlete; bronze medal winner at the 1936 Winter Olympics
- Richard Lawrence (art director)
- Richard Lawrence (cricketer), English cricketer
- Richard Lawrence (politician) (1942–2022), American politician
- Richard D. Lawrence (1930–2016), U.S. Army general
- Richard Lawrence (born 1953), British spiritual teacher and author, executive secretary of the Aetherius Society for Europe and Africa
- Richard Lawrence, Labour candidate for Ecclesall in the 2012 Sheffield City Council election

== See also ==
- Richard Laurence (1760–1838), Church of Ireland Archbishop of Cashel
