= The Right Stuff (franchise) =

Film / TV franchise about astronaut program

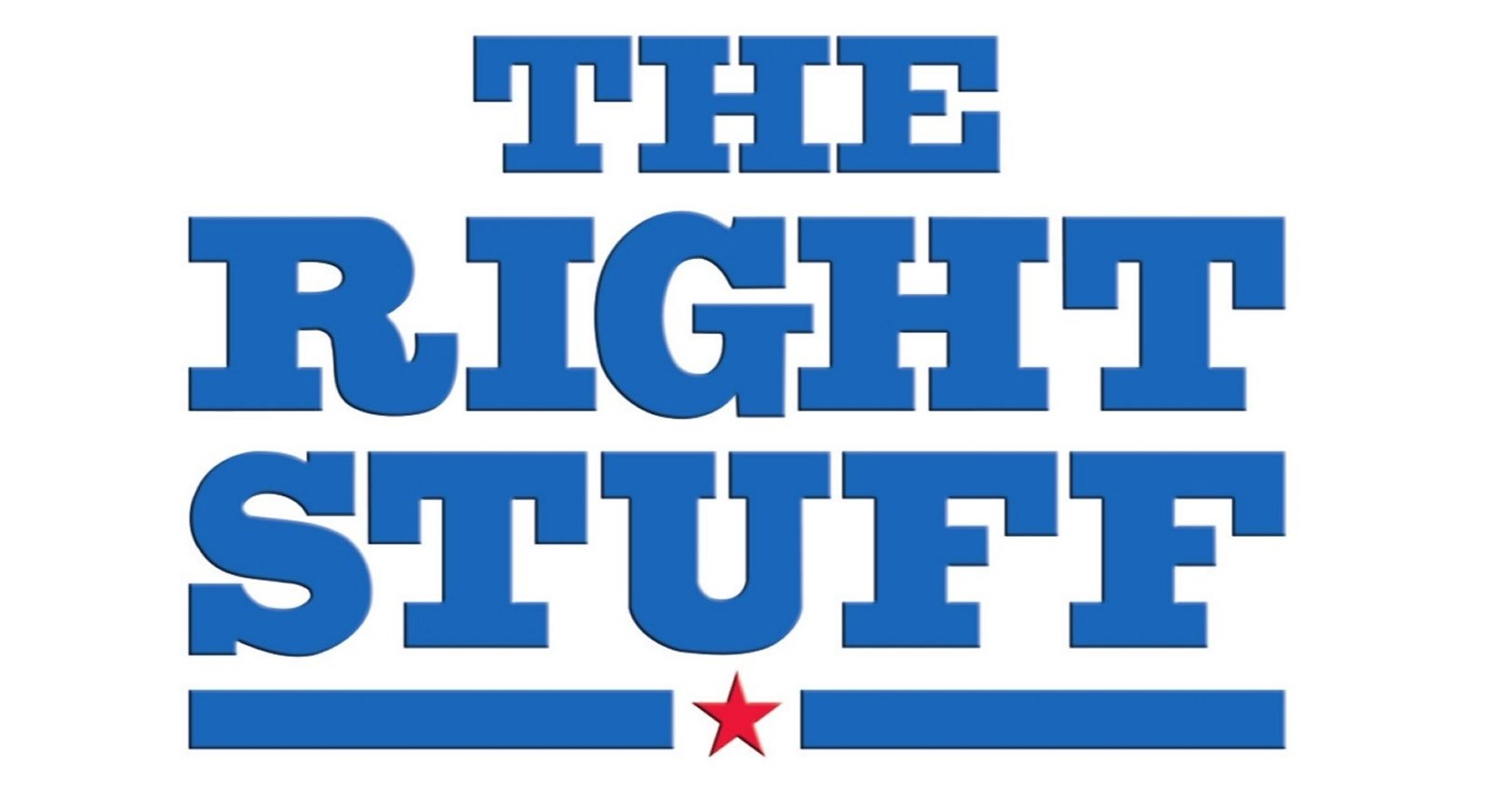
- Official franchise logo
- Based on: The Right Stuff by Tom Wolfe
- Starring: Various (See list below)
- Distributed by: Warner Bros. Pictures, Disney+
- Country: United States
- Language: English
- Budget: $27,000,000 (1 theatrical film)
- Box office: $21,713,000 (1 theatrical film)

The Right Stuff franchise consists of American historical drama installments, including film and television mediums. Each installment details the aeronautical research at Edwards Air Force Base in California, United States, which lead to the Mercury Seven where seven military pilots were selected to be astronauts for Project Mercury; the first human spaceflight by the United States. Pilots were chosen from the Navy, Marine Corps, and Air Force. A television series was developed by Warner Bros. for National Geographic, and upon being acquired by The Walt Disney Company, the studio also green-lit a documentary feature film; both were released as streaming exclusives available on Disney+.

The original film was met with critical acclaim, and was nominated for various Academy Awards; winning a number of those nominations. In contrast to these accolades, the movie was a disappointment financially at the box office. Conversely the television series adaptation, was met with negative reviews from critics and viewers alike who compared it as inferior to the original. The accompanying documentary movie was met with a mixed response with praise given to its director for the use of archival recordings and lack of modern-day narration, but complaints calling it "boring". Despite this reception and its cancellation on Disney+, the television show was actively being shopped around to other networks and streaming services at that time.

== Film ==
Film	U.S. release date	Director	Writer	Producers
The Right Stuff	October 21, 1983	Philip Kaufman	Philip Kaufman	Irwin Winkler and Robert Chartoff
The Real Right Stuff	November 20, 2020	Tom Jennings	Tom Jennings	Rob Kirk and Chris Morcom

=== The Right Stuff (1983) ===
The non-fiction account of the first fifteen years of America's space program are explored, detailing the experiences of the lives of test pilots who became known as the Mercury Seven, including: Chuck Yeager, Virgil Grissom, Gordon Cooper, John Glenn, Alan Shepard, Walter Schirra, and Donald Slayton. Explored in detail are the dangers and pitfalls that transpired during NASA's earliest attempts, failures, and achievements. During a time of national political turmoil and a race to become the dominant power in space travel, each of their familial trials are depicted with personal crises they endured resulting in great technological innovation and advancements as well.

=== The Real Right Stuff (2020) ===
Released as a documentary feature film created through a compilation of archival footage, photographs, and audio; the film details the events that transpired in the space race during the Cold War. The events detailed include America's technological advancements in space exploration, and the original Mercury Seven astronauts who played a role in completing these missions. The Real Right Stuff shows how these historical events inspired the future, including modern-day scientific studies of outer space.

== Television ==
Series	Season	Episodes	Originally released			Showrunner	Writers	Executive producers
Series	Season	Episodes	First released	Last released	Network	Showrunner	Writers	Executive producers
The Right Stuff	1	8	October 9, 2020	November 20, 2020	Disney+	Mark Lafferty	Mark Lafferty, Will Staples, Lizzie Mickery, Howard Korder, Vinnie Wilhelm, Ameni Rozsa, Danielle Roderick	Mark Lafferty, Will Staples, Leonardo DiCaprio, Jennifer Davisson, Lizzie Mickery, Howard Korder

In July 2017, a television series adaptation of the 1983 film was announced as being in development. By February 2019, the project was ordered to series and was created and written by Will Staples, with Mark Lafferty serving as showrunner. The show centered around the same factual events that were depicted in the original movie, though expanded upon with additional detail given the long-form storytelling format. The project was a joint-venture production between National Geographic Studios, Appian Way Productions, Warner Bros. Television Studios, Warner Horizon Scripted Television, and Disney+ Originals; while National Geographic handled distribution through its parent company The Walt Disney Company, exclusively via their Disney+ streaming service.

The Right Stuff debuted on October 9, 2020 and lasted until November 20, 2020; including a total of eight episodes. The series was met with mixed critical reception overall, being declared inferior to the feature film. By April 2021, the television show was canceled at Disney+ and not renewed for a second season despite earlier plans to do so. The series was being shopped around to other networks for a renewal at that point in time, and as the series was created by Warner Bros. Television and developed for National Geographic prior to the latter's acquisition by The Walt Disney Company, HBO Max and Turner Network Television are frontrunners in the acquiring series move. Though the cast's contracts were pending termination, the associated studios are working to negotiate for a second season.

== Main cast and characters ==
List indicator

This section includes characters who will appear or have appeared in the franchise in main roles.

- An empty grey cell indicates the character was not in the film, or that the character's official presence has not yet been confirmed.

Character	Film		Television
Character	The Right Stuff	The Real Right Stuff	Television
Charles "Chuck" Yeager	Sam Shepard	Charles "Chuck" Yeager	Referenced
Virgil "Gus" Grissom	Fred Ward	Virgil "Gus" Grissom	Michael Trotter
Gordon "Gordo" Cooper	Dennis Quaid	Gordon "Gordo" Cooper	Colin O'Donoghue
John Glenn	Ed Harris	John Glenn	Patrick J. Adams
Alan Shepard	Scott Glenn	Alan Shepard	Jake McDorman
Walter "Wally" Schirra	Lance Henriksen	Walter "Wally" Schirra	Aaron Staton
Donald "Deke" Slayton	Scott Paulin	Donald "Deke" Slayton	Micah Stock
Scott Carpenter	Charles Frank	Scott Carpenter	James Lafferty

== Additional crew and production details ==
Title	Crew/Detail					
Title	Composer(s)	Cinematographer(s)	Editor(s)	Production companies	Distributing company	Running time
The Right Stuff	Bill Conti	Caleb Deschanel	Glenn Farr, Lisa Fruchtman, Stephen A. Rotter, Douglas Stewart & Tom Rolf	The Ladd Company	Warner Bros. Pictures	3 hrs 12 mins
The Real Right Stuff	James Everingham	Archival recordings and materials compiled by: Tom Jennings	David Tillman	Walt Disney Television, 1985 Films, National Geographic Original Documentaries	Disney+	2 hrs
The Right Stuff (TV series)	Adam Taylor	Evans Brown, Christopher Norr, Peter Menzies Jr., and Adam Suschitzky	Matt Barber, Paul Karasick, Pattye Rogers, Matthew Colona & Luyen Vu	Walt Disney Television, Appian Way Productions, Warner Horizon Television Studios, National Geographic Original Series	Disney+	6 hrs (45 mins episodes)

== Reception ==
=== Box office and financial performance ===
Title	Box office gross			Box office ranking		Budget	Worldwide Total loss	Ref.
Title	North America	Other territories	Worldwide	All time North America	All time worldwide	Budget	Worldwide Total loss	Ref.
The Right Stuff	$21,500,000	$213	$21,713,000	#3,488	#22,238	$27,000,000	-$5,287,000	

=== Critical and public response ===
Film	Rotten Tomatoes	Metacritic
The Right Stuff	96% (50 reviews)	91/100 (16 reviews)
The Real Right Stuff	—N/a (4 reviews)	—N/a
The Right Stuff (TV series)	55% (31 reviews)	61/100 (22 reviews)
