= The Right Stuff (TV series) =

American drama limited-run series

- Genre: Historical drama
- Based on: The Right Stuff by Philip Kaufman; The Right Stuff by Tom Wolfe
- Developed by: Mark Lafferty
- Starring: Patrick J. Adams; Jake McDorman; Colin O'Donoghue
- Composer: Adam Taylor
- Country of origin: United States
- Original language: English
- No. of seasons: 1
- No. of episodes: 8

Production
- Executive producers: Will Staples; Leonardo DiCaprio; Jennifer Davisson; Mark Lafferty; Lizzie Mickery; Howard Korder
- Running time: 46–54 minutes
- Production companies: Appian Way Productions; Warner Bros. Television; National Geographic Studios

Original release
- Network: Disney+
- Release: October 9 – November 20, 2020

The Right Stuff is an American historical drama limited television series, loosely based on the 1979 book of the same name by Tom Wolfe and its 1983 film adaptation, that premiered on October 9, 2020, on Disney+. It is the third installment in the titular franchise. It explores the origins and growth of the United States' space program. On April 3, 2021, Disney+ canceled the series due to a redesign in the NatGeo channel's focus.

The series was removed from Disney+ on May 26, 2023, amidst the Disney+ and Hulu purge.

== Premise ==
The Right Stuff takes a "gritty, anti-nostalgic look at what would become America's first reality show as the obsessive original Mercury Seven astronauts and their families become instant celebrities in a competition that will either kill them or make them immortal. The eight-part, one-hour-per-episode drama will follow the protagonists from the Mojave Desert to the edges of space, with future seasons carrying through to humankind’s greatest achievement: the moon landing."

== Cast and characters ==
=== Main ===
- Jake McDorman as Alan Shepard
- Patrick J. Adams as John Glenn
- Colin O'Donoghue as Gordon Cooper
- James Lafferty as Scott Carpenter
- Aaron Staton as Wally Schirra
- Michael Trotter as Gus Grissom
- Micah Stock as Deke Slayton
- Eric Ladin as Chris Kraft
- Patrick Fischler as Bob Gilruth
- Nora Zehetner as Annie Glenn
- Eloise Mumford as Trudy Cooper
- Jackson Pace as Glynn Lunney
- Shannon Lucio as Louise Shepard

=== Recurring ===
- Sacha Seberg as Wernher von Braun
- Jordan Woods-Robinson as Mike Turley
- Rachel Burttram as Betty Grissom
- Jade Albany Pietrantonio as Rene Carpenter
- Laura Ault as Jo Schirra
- Chandler Head as Cam Cooper
- Lucy Capri as Janita Cooper
- Taegan Burns as Laura Shepard
- Avery Burns as Julie Shepard
- Kyra Johnson as Lyn Glenn
- David Bolinger as David Glenn
- Victoria White as Marge Slayton
- Christopher Cassarino as Henri Landwirth
- Mamie Gummer as Jerrie Cobb
- Kaley Ronayne as Dee O'Hara
- Josh Cooke as Loudon Wainwright Jr.
- Danny Strong as John A. Powers
- Jordan Blair Mangold Brown as Eunice
- Elizabeth D'Onofrio as Doris

== Episodes ==
No.	Title	Directed by	Teleplay by	Original release date
1	"Sierra Hotel"	Chris Long	Mark Lafferty & Will Staples	October 9, 2020
In the opening prologue, it's May 5, 1961, when NASA is preparing to send first American man into space. Astronauts Alan Shepard and John Glenn prepare for the launch, with tensions high between them. Back in 1959, NASA's Space Flight Group, headed by Bob Gilruth, begins its search for the best test pilots and role models in the country to lead their first space mission. During testing, candidates Alan Shepard and John Glenn compete for the head of the pack, and Gordo Cooper asks his estranged wife, Trudy, to reconcile with him for the sake of the space program. From 108 candidates, only seven pilots are accepted: Alan Shepard, John Glenn, Gordo Cooper, Gus Grissom, Wally Schirra, Scott Carpenter, and Deke Slayton. In a press conference, this Mercury Seven are introduced to the world.
2	"Goodies"	John Coles	Lizzie Mickery	October 9, 2020
After being introduced in a press conference, the Mercury Seven tour America to promote the NASA space program and gain funding from Congress. Glenn charms journalists and audiences alike, but the other astronauts and their families struggle under the public attention. When Cooper punches a reporter, NASA helps cover it up and Glenn suggests that the Seven get an agent to manage their public relations. The Seven sign a deal with Life magazine, which gains exclusive rights to their life stories in exchange for a hefty payment. Shepard figures out that their celebrity has other perks, such as people giving them expensive cars almost for free.
3	"Single Combat Warrior"	Louise N.D. Friedberg	Howard Korder	October 16, 2020
Preparations are underway for an unmanned rocket launch, and Flight Director Chris Kraft works to get his mission control team ready. The Mercury Seven test in a MASTIF that simulates spinning in space, during which Shepard clocks the shortest time when he gets dizzy. Despite a ringing in his ear, Shepard pushes himself to go back in the MASTIF repeatedly. Glenn pushes for more prominence, and is uncomfortable with the antics of the rest of Seven, who keep partying and sleeping around. Cooper and Grissom come to blows over old Air Force business. The Seven see a prototype of the Mercury capsule for the first time and realize that they're not expected to fly it. The rocket explodes during launch, witnessed by the Seven and their families.
4	"Advent"	Nick Copus	Vinnie Wilhelm	October 23, 2020
The Soviet space program achieves another milestone when their probe takes pictures of the far side of the Moon. NASA brings in rocket scientist and former Nazi Wernher von Braun, who clashes with Kraft. The Seven confront Gilruth over their role in program. Glenn spends Christmas lobbying for presidential candidate John F. Kennedy. Shepard and his wife, Louise, adopt Louise's orphaned niece. Cooper is contacted by his ex-lover, Lurleen, which forces his confrontation and reconciliation with Trudy.
5	"The Kona Kai Seance"	Rob Bailey	Mark Lafferty	October 30, 2020
The Seven anticipate the release of the flight order soon. Trudy meets aviator Jerrie Cobb, who wants Trudy's help to form a women's astronaut corp, with Trudy as one of the recruits. The ringing in Shepard's ear worsens. After a fellow test pilot dies, the Seven bond by sharing stories about their close calls with death. Cooper and Grissom resolve their past conflict. Shepard confesses to Glenn that a photographer caught him in an indiscretion. Glenn helps bury the incident, but Shepard is angered that Glenn got NASA involved and accuses him of trying to sabotage Shepard's reputation. On the day to decide the flight order, the Seven are told that they will vote among themselves who will be first, and Shepard gets the spot.
6	"Vostok"	Nick Copus	Ameni Rozsa	November 6, 2020
NASA holds a press conference to announce that Shepard, Grissom and Glenn will be the "first team" to be launched into space, though they deny that there's a ranking order for the three. Glenn realizes that keeping the order secret means that NASA can still change their mind and, despite his wife Annie's disapproval, writes letters to NASA about Shepard's misconduct. Two months before launch, PSAC requests extensive tests of the astronauts. Despite Shepard's ear problem, his demonstration is a success. Slayton is taken out of Seven when his heart arrhythmia is discovered. Shepard's launch is delayed for a test launch with a chimpanzee. The test is successful, but the delay allows the Soviets to be the first to send a man into space, with Yuri Gagarin.
7	"Ziggurat"	Andrew Bernstein	Vinnie Wilhelm & Danielle Roderick	November 13, 2020
Following the Soviet Union's space flight and the Bay of Pigs, President Kennedy puts full support behind Shepard's space launch, which will be open to press and spectators. News about the women's astronaut corp comes out; when Cooper is questioned about it at a press conference, he makes a joke about it, and Trudy is disappointed. Shepard finds out about Glenn's letters against him. Glenn copes with people assuming that he'll be the first to fly. Louise is told about Shepard's indiscretion. Inclement weather delays Shepard's launch by two days, but Shepard is spotted in his flight suit by the press, revealing to all that he'll be the first American to go to space.
8	"Flight"	Andrew Bernstein	Mark Lafferty & Vinnie Wilhelm	November 20, 2020
Shepard's flight on Freedom Seven is a success. Afterward Shepard is given accolades and a parade, but he confesses to Glenn that he's dissatisfied with the shortness and simplicity of his flight, and is searching for the next big thing. Trudy leaves Cooper, only to find that Jerrie Cobb can't accept her for the women's astronaut program due to Cooper's public comments. Cooper resumes his relationship with Lurleen. Shepard collapses from pain in his ear. Slayton is given the position of Chief of the Astronaut Office at NASA. President Kennedy makes a speech at Congress proposing that the US take the challenge to land a man on the Moon by the end of the decade. Glenn, inspired by Kennedy, lobbies for the large Atlas rocket over the Redstone, in order to chase the Moon landing.

== Production ==
On July 25, 2017, it was announced that National Geographic was partnering with Appian Way Productions and Warner Horizon Television to option the screen rights to Tom Wolfe's 1979 novel The Right Stuff. The series was set to be written by Will Staples who was also expected to executive produce alongside Leonardo DiCaprio and Jennifer Davisson.

On February 10, 2019, it was announced during the Television Critics Association's annual winter press tour that National Geographic had given the production a series order. David Nutter was expected to direct the premiere episode. Additional executive producers were set to include Mark Lafferty and Lizzie Mickery with Lafferty also serving as showrunner.

The series premiered on October 9, 2020. On November 20, 2020, the series was granted a tax credit to film a second season in San Diego. The show had yet to be officially renewed at the time. However, on April 3, 2021, it was announced that Disney+ had canceled the series due to a change in NatGeo's programming focus. Show financier Warner Bros. Television is looking to shop the series to other networks such as TNT and HBO Max.

=== Casting ===
On May 31, 2019, Patrick J. Adams had been cast in the series lead role of John Glenn. On June 14, 2019, Jake McDorman and Colin O'Donoghue were cast as Alan Shepard and Gordon Cooper, respectively. On June 21, 2019, Eric Ladin, Patrick Fischler, Nora Zehetner, Eloise Mumford, Shannon Lucio, and Josh Cooke joined the cast. On August 19, 2019, Danny Strong was cast as NASA Spokesman John A. "Shorty" Powers. On November 29, 2019, Mamie Gummer was cast as "Mercury 13" astronaut hopeful, Jerrie Cobb.

== Reception ==
=== Critical response ===
On review aggregator website Rotten Tomatoes, the series holds an approval rating of 55% based on 31 reviews, with an average rating of 7.21/10. The site's critics consensus reads: "The Right Stuff contains some grace notes in its depiction of America's first slate of astronauts, but this tired retread of Tom Wolfe's famed book mostly makes the wrong moves in revitalizing space race history for the modern era." On Metacritic, the series has a weighted average score of 61 out of 100, based on 22 critics, indicating "generally favorable reviews".

Richard Roeper of The Chicago Sun-Times praised the show as "a visually striking, well-acted period piece that plays like 'Mad Men: The Flyboys Edition." Writing for Rolling Stone, Alan Sepinwall called the show "a dutiful, mostly competent, infrequently lively historical workplace drama" and "almost defiantly generic in every way." Wall Street Journal reviewer John Anderson described the show as "a perfectly serviceable drama about a rococo period of American history." Lucy Mangan of The Guardian rated the show 4 out of 5 stars and claimed that "The Right Stuff doesn’t reach for the stars, but looks back to the Earth from which the phenomenon of astronauts and space travel, the glamour and the myths grew, along with the appetites they fed, and is all the more interesting for that." Matt Cabral of Common Sense Media rated the series 3 out of 5 stars and called it a "space drama" that is "serviceable but doesn't reach the stars."

In Caroline Framke's review for Variety, she criticized the show as "familiar" and said it "never met a space story cliché it didn't embrace with open arms." In a review for The Dispatch, Alec Dent criticized the show's choice to leave out Chuck Yeager, saying his absence "embodies the central problem of the show: those behind it don't seem to understand what the right stuff is, at least not well enough to portray it on TV."

=== Accolades ===
Year	Award	Category	Recipient(s)	Result	Ref.
2021	Motion Picture Sound Editors	Outstanding Achievement in Sound Editing - Episodic Short Form - Dialogue and ADR	Walter Newman, Brian Armstrong, Darleen Stoker	Nominated	
2021	Motion Picture Sound Editors	Outstanding Achievement in Sound Editing - Episodic Short Form - Effects and Foley	Walter Newman, Kenneth Young, Rickley W. Dumm, Peter Reynolds. Sanaa Kelley, Adam DeCoster	Nominated	

== See also ==
- The Right Stuff, 1983 film
