= Yentl (film) =

1983 film by Barbra Streisand

- Theatrical release poster
- Directed by: Barbra Streisand
- Screenplay by: Barbra Streisand; Jack Rosenthal
- Based on: "Yentl the Yeshiva Boy"; 1962 story by Isaac Bashevis Singer
- Produced by: Barbra Streisand; Larry DeWaay; Rusty Lemorande; John Davis
- Starring: Barbra Streisand; Mandy Patinkin; Amy Irving
- Cinematography: David Watkin
- Edited by: Terry Rawlings
- Music by: Michel Legrand (music); Alan Bergman (lyrics); Marilyn Bergman (lyrics)
- Production companies: United Artists; Barwood Films; Ladbroke Entertainment
- Distributed by: MGM/UA Entertainment Company
- Release date: November 18, 1983 (United States)
- Running time: 134 min (theatrical cut); 137 min (director's cut)
- Country: United States
- Language: English
- Budget: $12 million
- Box office: $68.7 million

Yentl is a 1983 American romantic musical drama film co-written, co-produced, directed by, and starring Barbra Streisand in her directorial debut. It is based on Isaac Bashevis Singer's short story "Yentl the Yeshiva Boy".

The film incorporates music to tell the story of Yentl Mendel, an Ashkenazi Jewish woman in Poland in 1904 who decides to disguise herself as a man named Anshel so that she can receive an education in Talmudic law. The film's musical score and songs, composed by Michel Legrand, with lyrics by Alan and Marilyn Bergman, include the songs "Papa, Can You Hear Me?" and "The Way He Makes Me Feel", both sung by Streisand.

Yentl was theatrically released in the United States on November 18, 1983, by MGM/UA Entertainment Company. It received generally positive reviews from critics, and was a box-office success, grossing $68.7 million against the production budget of $12 million. The film received the Academy Award for Best Original Song Score and the Golden Globe Award for Best Motion Picture—Musical or Comedy and Best Director for Streisand, making her the first woman to win Best Director at the Golden Globes.

== Plot ==
Yentl Mendel is a woman living in an Ashkenazi shtetl named Yanev in Poland in 1904. Yentl's father, Reb Mendel (“Papa”), secretly instructs her in the Talmud despite the proscription of such study by women according to the custom of her community. Yentl refuses to be married off to a man.

After the death of her father, Yentl decides to cut her hair short, dress like a man, take her late brother's name, Anshel, and enter a Yeshiva, a Jewish religious school in Bychawa. There she befriends a fellow student, Avigdor, and meets his fiancée, Hadass Vishkower. Upon discovering that Avigdor lied about his brother's death (a suicide, not pneumonia or flu as Avigdor claimed), Hadass' family cancels the wedding over fears that Avigdor's family is tainted with insanity. Hadass' parents decide that she should marry "Anshel" instead, and Avigdor encourages "Anshel" to go ahead with the marriage, so Hadass can marry someone she knows rather than have a stranger for a husband. "Anshel" reluctantly marries Hadass so Avigdor will not leave town; the marriage remains unconsummated: "Anshel" claims it is a sin for a woman to give herself to a man while she loves another. "Anshel" starts to teach Hadass the Talmud. Meanwhile, Hadass develops romantic feelings for "Anshel", while Yentl herself is falling in love with Avigdor.

Yentl leaves for a trip to the city with Avigdor that will take him away from home for a few days. In their lodging in the city, Yentl finally reveals her true identity to Avigdor. At first, Avigdor does not believe his friend is a woman, but Yentl proves her womanhood by showing him her breasts. When a confused and frightened Avigdor asks her why she did not tell him, Yentl breaks down in his arms, showing she has revealed her real self to him out of love. Avigdor is stunned, but, after a moment, reciprocates the feeling and remarks how beautiful Yentl's features are. The two kiss, but, Avigdor breaks away suddenly, remembering Hadass. Yentl assures him their marriage is not valid. Avigdor suggests he and Yentl elope. Yentl realizes that she will not be able to continue her studies if she marries Avigdor, and that she wants more from life than to be a wife. Yentl and Avigdor part ways, knowing they will always care for each other. It is implied that Hadass and "Anshel"'s marriage is annulled, as it was never consummated. Avigdor returns to marry Hadass. In the following scene, the two are successfully reunited and reading a letter from Yentl, learning that she is going to a new place and will love them both always. Yentl leaves Europe on a boat bound for the United States, where she hopes to lead a life with more freedom. With a smile on her face, Yentl finishes her story by singing: "Papa, watch me fly."

== Cast ==
- Barbra Streisand as Yentl/“Anshel”
- Mandy Patinkin as Avigdor
- Amy Irving as Hadass Vishkower
- Nehemiah Persoff as Reb Mendel (“Papa”)
- Steven Hill as Reb Alter Vishkower
- Allan Corduner as Shimmele
- David de Keyser as Rabbi Zalman
- Miriam Margolyes as Sarah
- Doreen Mantle as Mrs. Shaemen
- Lynda Baron as Peshe
- Kerry Shale as Yeshiva Student

== Production ==
After reading Isaac Bashevis Singer's story "Yentl: The Yeshiva Boy" in 1968, Barbra Streisand sought to make it her next film after her completion of Funny Girl. The screen rights were gained in 1969, with Streisand to be the star. In 1971, Czech director Ivan Passer was originally hired by First Artists to direct the film. Singer wrote the screenplay and retitled it Masquerade, but because of his belief that Streisand's age and celebrity would detract from the film, Singer backed out.

In 1973, Streisand read Singer's story to her then-partner, producer Jon Peters, to gain further support for the film. However, like Passer, he was convinced that Streisand was too old and feminine to convincingly play the part the film would demand. By 1976, after completing A Star Is Born (1976), Streisand became convinced that she was, in fact, too old to play the part in Yentl, and would take up the film as director. Because she had wanted to be both the star and director, studios continued to draw back from funding the film, with the fear that Streisand as a rookie director would be unable to responsibly handle a multi-million dollar project. Additionally, Streisand reported that studios claimed the film was "not commercial" because it was "too ethnic". In 1978, Streisand's friends, Alan and Marilyn Bergman, suggested that Yentl be re-imagined as a musical. It was hoped that a musical starring Streisand would be accepted and better received by a studio.

Peters attempted to persuade Streisand to drop the project and perform at Wembley Stadium in London instead, for an offer of $1 million. She refused that offer, as well as a $2 million follow-up, to reconsider. Another offer by Peters, which was to be in excess of $10 million for Streisand to perform in Las Vegas, was also promptly turned down in favor of pursuing the Yentl project. Her attitude regarding her age quickly changed after she disguised herself as a man, temporarily confusing Peters into thinking that a stranger had broken into the house. Peters, now convinced of her ability to play a male, agreed to sign a three-year production contract with Orion Pictures in March 1978. To combat the age she was to play in the film, she changed Yentl from being 16 to 26.

According to various sources, Streisand became increasingly inspired and determined to bring Yentl into production when, in the summer of 1979, she and her brother Sheldon (Streisand) visited their father Emanuel's grave at Mount Hebron Cemetery for the first time in 30 years. For the sake of making memory of the occasion, Streisand had her brother take a photo of her standing next to her father's tombstone. The photo revealed that Emanuel Streisand's grave was directly next to that of a man named Anshel, the name of Yentl Mendel's dead brother that Yentl adopts when she takes on a male identity. Intrigued, Streisand complied with her brother when he suggested they contact a psychic to perform a séance, convinced that her father was beckoning them both from beyond the grave.

In 1979, Streisand finally reached an agreement with Orion Pictures to direct and star in Yentl. She was working with a script by Ted Allen at the time, but discarded a majority of it, keeping the musical segments. The film was to be co-produced by Streisand's friends and associates: Joan Marshall Ashby and Peters. To prepare for the film, Streisand exhaustively researched the many aspects of Judaism, ceremonies, relentlessly studied the Torah, and consulted numerous rabbis, one being Rabbi Daniel Lapin, whom Streisand appointed as the main religious consultant for the film.

Orion Pictures made the announcement that it had agreed to produce Yentl as Streisand's directorial debut in the late summer of 1980. Traveling to Prague with a Super-8 camera and song lyrics, Streisand scouted out film locations while also shooting film of herself walking through the city in costume with early recordings of Yentl's soundtrack being played in the background. However, not long after her return, Heaven's Gate (1980), a Michael Cimino picture produced by United Artists, lost $35 million at the box office, bringing Orion to cancel all films that exceeded a $10 million production cost in order to preserve itself. Yentl, which was priced at $14 million, was cancelled. The film was turned down again and again until Peters, Peter Guber, and Neil Bogart formed PolyGram Pictures and agreed to produce the film. However, due to creative differences and personal disputes between Streisand and Peters, Yentl was dropped once again.

Fifteen years after its original conception and 20 script variations later, Yentl's production finally began on April 14, 1982 in the Lee International Studios of London, after United Artists merged with MGM and gained the new leadership of Freddie Fields and David Begelman—Streisand's former agent from the late 1960s. Yentl was green-lighted as Streisand's directoral debut at a budget of $14.5 million. Shooting concluded in October 1982, which was to be followed by Streisand requiring ten weeks to dub the soundtrack. In the end, the film went $1.5 million over budget, which Streisand paid for with her salary, as stated in the contract with UA.

== Themes ==
Yentl begins with the same premise as Singer's original story. Streisand's character is a young woman growing up in an oppressive society that will not let her pursue her religious education. She is told she must have the "soul of a man" because of her desire to learn. Her talent, curiosity and ambition are considered strictly masculine by her society and religious tradition. Unwilling to live without access to education on the basis of sex, Yentl leaves her home and conceals her sex to be able to pursue the scholarly occupation of a Jewish man. In doing so, Yentl inadvertently embarks on a journey of self-discovery that defies traditional ideas of gender roles within her community.

Yentl's defiance of social expectation and her reversal of traditional gender roles crosses deeply rooted religious boundaries, particularly once Yentl marries Hadass Vishkower (Amy Irving). Until this point, Yentl only adopts the appearance and occupation of a man, but now she lives as a man in a more complete sense, as a husband, occupying the traditionally male role in her household. Her identity as a woman, not only socially and religiously, but also personally and sexually, is called into question, as she occupies this role and develops an intimate, loving connection with Hadass, complete with hinted sexual chemistry.

In Singer's story, this dual betrayal of nature and the divine plan dooms Yentl to a life of pain, alienation, and shameful dishonesty. After her marriage ends in disaster, Yentl remains trapped forever in her disguise, unable to find redemption from her rejection of a normal life—a take on the legend of the Wandering Jew.

In Streisand's film, Yentl's defiance of expectation and definition, a rejection of sexist gender roles, is treated as a virtue. Though Yentl faces difficult choices in her attempt to live the life of her choosing, including sacrificing her love of Avigdor (Mandy Patinkin), she finds herself capable of following her dreams, of feeling different forms of love and intimacy with both sexes, as well as emerging from confusion and ambiguity with a powerful, independent sense of self-worth. At the film's conclusion, Yentl takes this developed, ever-evolving self to America to seek new possibilities and opportunities for discovery. Singer criticized the film's ending as hopelessly unrealistic, but the ending serves more as an affirmation of Yentl's independence and relentless optimism than a historically fitting conclusion to the narrative.

Throughout her complex interaction with Hadass and Avigdor, Yentl manages conflict with empathy and respect. Her difficult experiences expand, rather than trap her personality. She does not conform to expectations from her surroundings or from her audience, neither remaining merely a woman hiding in men's clothing nor revealing herself to be neutered or firmly homosexual. She refuses to accept a limited, traditional life, even when offered one in marriage to Avigdor. Rather, Yentl becomes a "real woman", thoroughly modern and encompassing "what society has defined as both masculine and feminine traits". In the end, her pain, her confusion, and her loss never destroy her hope or resolve. She remains assertive and defiant, daring to find or to create room for new self-definition and new possibility, without seeking simple or complete resolution to ongoing challenges in her constant thirst for more.

Although Singer insisted that Yentl does not have feminist undertones, many critics and viewers of the film consider Yentl to be a feminist role model. One reason is that she rebels against patriarchal Orthodox Jewish society by disguising herself as a man to do what she loves—study the Talmud. Another reason is that although she finds herself in love with Avigdor, she has the strength to leave him behind, in exchange for a freer life in the United States of America.

=== Jewish-American themes ===
Streisand's interpretation of Singer's "Yentl the Yeshiva Boy" has philosophical implications as a Jewish-American film. Streisand changed Singer's specific ending, in which Yentl wanders off, presumably to a different yeshiva, to continue her studies and her cross-dressing. In the film interpretation of the story, Yentl moves on, but this time to the United States of America. Viewers are led to believe that in the States she can have both study and womanhood. This idea symbolizes a refusal to conform to old-world Jewish standards and instead move "against the authority and authenticity of the Judaic past", which Streisand asserts has "propelled itself so far from the austerity of Talmudic study".

Often, Jewish-American immigrants who struck out on their own were unable to dedicate the amount of time and energy into text study that their ancestors had; their lives instead were characterized by an "individualism and experimentalism" that "Jewish immigrants and their descendants have so strikingly honored, reinforced, and revised". The differences between the written version of this story, which originated in Warsaw, and the American film interpretation thus symbolize a potential philosophical shift from the self-understanding of Eastern-European Jewry to Jewish-American self-understanding: It suggests that the United States of America can potentially alter preexisting Jewish values.

=== Sexual themes ===
Yentl blurs lines between male and female and its characters develop attractions that could be seen as homosexual, although the film upholds a heterosexual sensibility. Yentl's desire is exclusively for her study partner, Avigdor, while her marriage to a woman remains unconsummated and at times is comical. Her choice to reveal herself as a woman to Avigdor in hopes of gaining his love firmly establishes her self-determination.

While Yentl does not take its characters outside the realm of heterosexuality, the film critically questions the "appropriateness of gender roles" as determined by society. Ultimately it argues that the society Yentl lives in does not allow equal opportunities for happiness for all people, especially women. In this way, it can be read as a potentially feminist text.

== Soundtrack ==
The soundtrack album to the film was released by Columbia Records in 1983.

== Release ==
Yentl was successful at the box office, opening at number 5 at the US box office upon its limited-release weekend and stayed in the top 10 for 9 weeks, peaking at number three, in its third week. The film went on to gross more than $40,218,899 at the US and Canadian box office on a budget of $12 million, and was amongst the top 20 highest-grossing films of the year at the box office. Internationally it grossed $28.5 million for a worldwide total of $68.7 million.

=== Home media ===
Yentl was released on home video in August 1984 on CBS/Fox Video (under license from MGM/UA Home Entertainment Group, Inc.). Another VHS was released by MGM/UA Home Video in 1989. It was released on DVD by Metro-Goldwyn-Mayer (under 20th Century Fox Home Entertainment) on February 3, 2009 as a two-disc "Director's Extended Cut" in the widescreen format. The DVD includes the theatrical cut, a director's extended cut with added scenes from Streisand's archives, an introduction by Streisand, an audio commentary with Streisand and Rusty Lemorande, deleted scenes including a storyboard sequence for a cut song, pre-rehearsal concepts and feature comparisons, stills galleries, and cast and crew info. A Blu-ray edition is being released by Twilight Time.

== Reception ==
=== Critical response ===
On the review aggregator website Rotten Tomatoes, 69% of 78 critics' reviews are positive, with an average rating of 6.6/10. The website's consensus reads: "Barbra Streisand takes on every conceivable role and acquits herself well in Yentl, a musical epic with a humdrum score that's given considerable lift from its writer-director-star's sheer force of will." Metacritic gave the movie a score of 68 based on 11 reviews, indicating "generally favorable reviews". It's featured on the Top Ten Films of 1983 by National Board of Review.

Roger Ebert gave the film three and a half out of four stars, saying: "Yentl is a movie with a great middle ... the middle 100 minutes of the movie are charming and moving and surprisingly interesting". In her review in The New Yorker, Pauline Kael wrote: "It has a distinctive and surprising spirit. It's funny, delicate, and intense—all at the same time". Jonathan Rosenbaum, for the Chicago Reader, praised Streisand's direction and Michel Legrand's music: "The results may be a little protracted, but Streisand gives it her best shot, and the music by Michel Legrand is memorable". Isaac Bashevis Singer, writer of "Yentl the Yeshiva Boy", the short story first published in English in 1983, said of Barbra Streisand's film adaptation: "I did not find artistic merit neither in the adaptation, nor in the directing".

In their 1985 Film Quarterly review, Allison Fernley and Paula Maloof lauded Streisand for departing from genre expectations, namely upholding Yentl as a strong female and therefore potential feminist role model rather than an accomplice in a male-dominated romance, for defying the expectations of the musical genre by choosing to give all musical parts to Yentl alone, and the "subversion of the cross-dressing genre" by refusing to end the film with a "comfortable reassuring heterosexual union" between Yentl and Avigdor, demanding the audience consider more serious questions about the role of societal conventions. Jack Kroll of Newsweek in 1983 called Streisand's control over the aesthetics of the film "a delight and at times an astonishment". Gary Arnold of The Washington Post observed an "uninspired score and other shortcomings" of the film, but saw its "exceptional charm and sentimental potency" as its saving grace. While she granted Streisand a sincere effort in creating Yentl, Janet Maslin's New York Times review in 1983 criticized Streisand's carelessness with certain aesthetic elements of the film as well as the ending, which she described as a "relatively harsh resolution", comparable to that of the original by I. B. Singer. Streisand responded publicly to Maslin, saying: "I spent more than ten years researching the material; how long did she spend on it?"

The film was sometimes humorously nicknamed or disparaged as Tootsie on the Roof called as a reference to its similarities to the 1982 comedy film Tootsie and the musical Fiddler on the Roof.

=== Awards and honors ===
Yentl won an Academy Award in 1984 for Best Adaptation Score, the award going to Michel Legrand (music), Alan Bergman (lyrics), and Marilyn Bergman (lyrics). Amy Irving was nominated for the Academy Award for Best Supporting Actress, and the film was also nominated for Best Art Direction/Set Decoration (Roy Walker, Leslie Tomkins, Tessa Davies).

Barbra Streisand became the first woman to be nominated for and receive a Golden Globe Award for Best Director for the film, and Yentl was nominated for four other Golden Globes (Best Actress, Best Actor, Best Original Score and Best Original Song), also winning the award for Best Motion Picture—Musical or Comedy. The film also nominated for the Grammy Award for Best Album of Instrumental Score Written for a Motion Picture or Television Special. The film was chosen by Time magazine and National Board of Review as one of the top ten films of 1983.

Despite Streisand's historic Golden Globe win, she was not nominated for an Academy Award, causing much controversy.

Although Yentl garnered considerable critical acclaim, the film also received three Razzie Award nominations: Worst Actor for Streisand, Worst Supporting Actress for Irving, and Worst Musical Score. Irving is one of just three performers to be nominated for an Oscar and a Razzie for the same performance; the others are James Coco in Only When I Laugh and Glenn Close in Hillbilly Elegy.

Year	Award	Category	Nominated work	Result
1983	Academy Awards	Best Supporting Actress	Amy Irving	Nominated
1983	Academy Awards	Best Art Direction	Art Direction: Roy Walker & Leslie Tomkins; Set Decoration: Tessa Davies	Nominated
1983	Academy Awards	Best Original Song Score and Its Adaptation or Adaptation Score	Michel Legrand, Alan & Marilyn Bergman	Won
1983	Academy Awards	Best Original Song	"Papa, Can You Hear Me?"; Music by Michel Legrand; Lyrics by Alan & Marilyn Bergman	Nominated
1983	Academy Awards	Best Original Song	"The Way He Makes Me Feel"; Music by Michel Legrand; Lyrics by Alan & Marilyn Bergman	Nominated
1983	David di Donatello Awards	Best Foreign Producer	Barbra Streisand	Nominated
1983	Golden Globe Awards	Best Motion Picture – Musical or Comedy		Won
1983	Golden Globe Awards	Best Actor in a Motion Picture – Musical or Comedy	Mandy Patinkin	Nominated
1983	Golden Globe Awards	Best Actress in a Motion Picture – Musical or Comedy	Barbra Streisand	Nominated
1983	Golden Globe Awards	Best Director	Barbra Streisand	Won
1983	Golden Globe Awards	Best Original Score	Michel Legrand, Alan & Marilyn Bergman	Nominated
1983	Golden Globe Awards	Best Original Song	"The Way He Makes Me Feel"; Music by Michel Legrand; Lyrics by Alan & Marilyn Bergman	Nominated
1983	Golden Raspberry Awards	Worst Actor	Barbra Streisand	Nominated
1983	Golden Raspberry Awards	Worst Supporting Actress	Amy Irving	Nominated
1983	Golden Raspberry Awards	Worst Musical Score	Michel Legrand, Alan & Marilyn Bergman	Nominated
1985	Grammy Awards	Best Album of Original Score Written for a Motion Picture or a Television Special	Yentl – Michel Legrand, Alan & Marilyn Bergman	Nominated
1985	Grammy Awards	Best Instrumental Arrangement Accompanying Vocal(s)	"Papa, Can You Hear Me?" – Michel Legrand	Nominated
1983	Nastro d'Argento	Best Foreign Actress	Barbra Streisand	Nominated
1983	Nastro d'Argento	Special Silver Ribbon	Barbra Streisand	Won
1983	National Board of Review Awards	Top Ten Films		10th Place
2009	Satellite Awards	Best Classic DVD	Yentl: 2-Disc Director's Extended Edition	Nominated
2009	Satellite Awards	Best DVD Extras	Yentl: 2-Disc Director's Extended Edition	Won
