= Jay Boekelheide =

American sound editor

- Occupation: Sound editor
- Years active: 1980-2010
- Spouse: Beth Goldman (?-present)
- Children: 3
- Family: Todd Boekelheide (brother)

Jay Boekelheide is an American sound editor . He won an Academy Award in 1983 for The Right Stuff in the category of Best Sound Editing. His brother Todd Boekelheide is also an Oscar winner, who won for best sound.

== Selected filmography ==
- Species (1995)
- Johnny Mnemonic (1994)
- Amadeus (1984)
- The Right Stuff (1983)
- Dragonslayer (1981)
