= Jimmy Picker =

American filmmaker

- Occupations: Animator, screenwriter, director, producer
- Years active: 1970s–present

Jimmy Picker is an American stop-motion claymation filmmaker, screenwriter, producer, and director. He was claymation director for The Electric Company from 1976 to 1977 and produced several short movies and two longer films. He contributed the animated sequence to Savage Steve Holland's Better Off Dead.

As a director, his short film Jimmy the C (1977) received a nomination for the Academy Award for Best Animated Short Film. In 1983, he won the award for his short film Sundae in New York.

== Career ==
In 1977, he co-produced the animated short Jimmy the C alongside Robert Grossman, receiving a nomination for the Academy Award for Best Animated Short Film.

== Selected filmography ==
- Jimmy the C (1977)
- Sundae in New York (1983)
- My Friend Liberty (1986)
- The Age of Ignorance (2003)
