= Jimmy the C =

1977 animated short

Jimmy the C is a 1979 animated short film directed by Jimmy Picker and co-produced by Picker (going by James), Robert Grossman and Craig Whitaker. It was nominated for an Academy Award for Animated Short Film. The film was preserved by the Academy Film Archive in 2009.

== Plot ==
The three-minute film features a clay-animated Jimmy Carter (who was U.S. president at the time) singing "Georgia on My Mind", referencing his birth state. He is accompanied by a choir of Mr. Peanut lookalikes, and gazes at the moon at night. Ray Charles' rendition of the song is used on the soundtrack.
