= Ed Harris filmography =

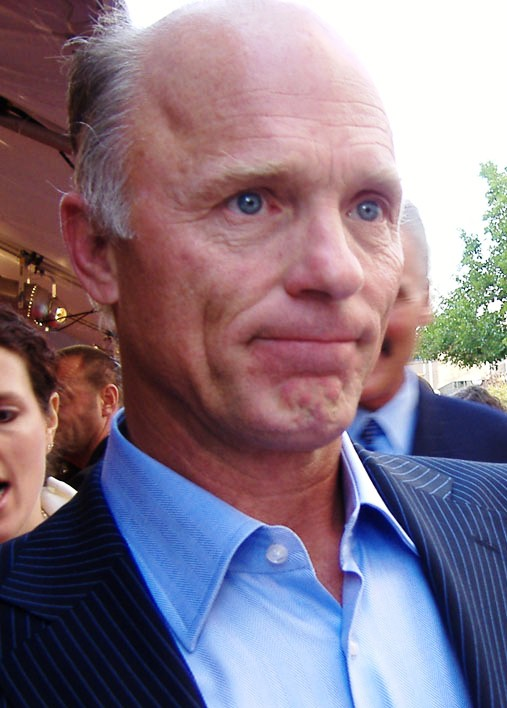
Harris at the 2005 Toronto International Film Festival

Ed Harris is an American actor and filmmaker. His performances in Apollo 13 (1995), The Truman Show (1998), Pollock (2000), and The Hours (2002) earned him critical acclaim in addition to Academy Award nominations.

Harris has appeared in several leading and supporting roles, such as in The Right Stuff (1983), Sweet Dreams (1985),The Abyss (1989), State of Grace (1990), Glengarry Glen Ross (1992), Nixon (1995), The Rock (1996), Stepmom (1998), A Beautiful Mind (2001), Enemy at the Gates (2001), A History of Violence (2005), Gone Baby Gone (2007), Snowpiercer (2013), and Mother! (2017).

In addition to directing Pollock, Harris also directed the western Appaloosa (2008). In television, Harris is notable for his roles as Miles Roby in the miniseries Empire Falls (2005) and as United States Senator John McCain in the television movie Game Change (2012), the latter of which earned him the Golden Globe Award for Best Supporting Actor – Series, Miniseries or Television Film.

He starred as the Man in Black in the HBO science fiction-western series Westworld (2016–2022), for which he earned a nomination for the Primetime Emmy Award for Outstanding Lead Actor in a Drama Series.

== Performances and works ==
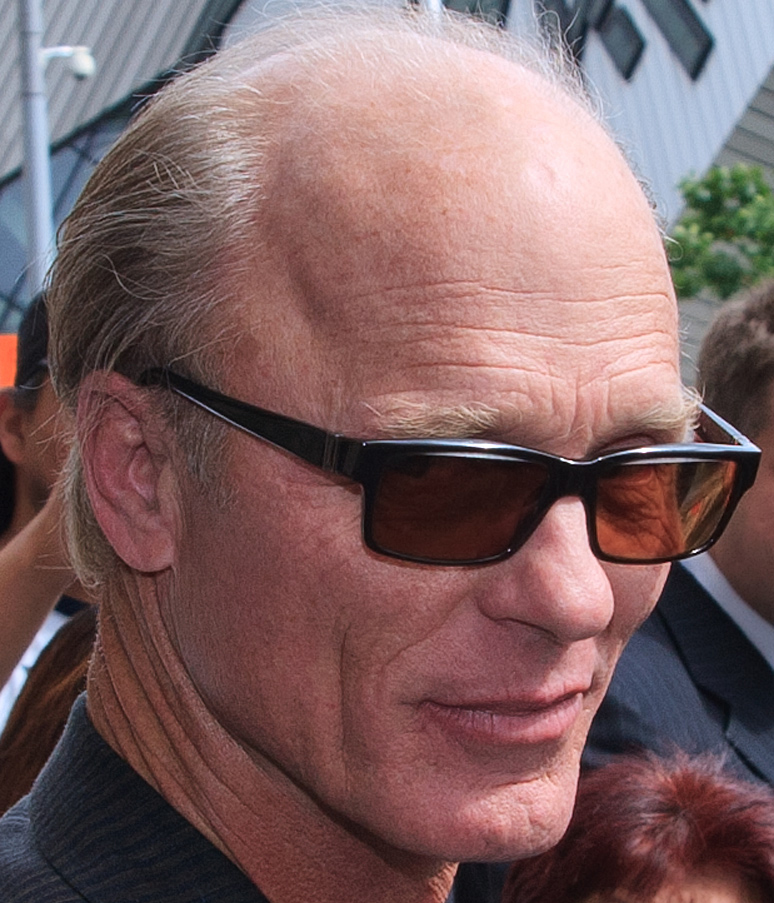
Harris at the 2010 Toronto International Film Festival

Key
†	Denotes works that have not yet been released

=== Film ===
Year	Title	Role	Director	Notes	Ref.
1978	Coma	Pathology Resident #2	Michael Crichton		
1980	Borderline	Hotchkiss	Jerrold Freedman		
1981	Knightriders	Billy	George A. Romero		
1982	Creepshow	Hank Blaine	George A. Romero	Segment "Father's Day"	
1983	The Right Stuff	John Glenn	Philip Kaufman		
1983	Under Fire	Oates	Roger Spottiswoode		
1984	Swing Shift	Jack Walsh	Jonathan Demme		
1984	Places in the Heart	Wayne Lomax	Robert Benton		
1985	Code Name: Emerald	Gus Lang	Jonathan Sanger		
1985	Alamo Bay	Shang Pierce	Louis Malle		
1985	Sweet Dreams	Charlie Dick	Karel Reisz		
1987	Walker	William Walker	Alex Cox		
1988	To Kill a Priest	Police Captain Stefan	Agnieszka Holland		
1989	Jacknife	David "Dave" Flannigan	David Jones		
1989	The Abyss	Virgil "Bud" Brigman	James Cameron		
1990	State of Grace	Frankie Flannery	Phil Joanou		
1991	Paris Trout	Harry Seagraves	Stephen Gyllenhaal		
1992	Glengarry Glen Ross	Dave Moss	James Foley		
1993	The Firm	Wayne Tarrance	Sydney Pollack		
1993	Needful Things	Sheriff Alan Pangborn	Fraser C. Heston		
1994	China Moon	Kyle Bodine	John Bailey		
1994	Milk Money	Tom Wheeler	Richard Benjamin		
1995	Just Cause	Blair Sullivan	Arne Glimcher		
1995	Apollo 13	Gene Kranz	Ron Howard		
1995	Nixon	E. Howard Hunt	Oliver Stone		
1996	Eye for an Eye	Mack McCann	John Schlesinger		
1996	The Rock	Gen. Francis X. Hummel	Michael Bay		
1997	Absolute Power	Det. Seth Frank	Clint Eastwood		
1998	The Truman Show	Christof	Peter Weir		
1998	Stepmom	Luke Harrison	Chris Columbus		
1999	The Third Miracle	Father Frank Shore	Agnieszka Holland		
2000	Pollock	Jackson Pollock	Himself	Also producer	
2000	The Prime Gig	Kelly Grant	Gregory Mosher		
2000	Waking the Dead	Jerry Charmichael	Keith Gordon		
2001	A Beautiful Mind	William Parcher	Ron Howard		
2001	Buffalo Soldiers	Colonel Berman	Gregor Jordan		
2001	Enemy at the Gates	Major Erwin König	Jean-Jacques Annaud		
2002	The Hours	Richard Brown	Stephen Daldry		
2003	Masked and Anonymous	Oscar Vogel	Larry Charles		
2003	Radio	Coach Harold Jones	Michael Tollin		
2003	The Human Stain	Lester Farley	Robert Benton		
2005	Winter Passing	Don Holdin	Adam Rapp		
2005	A History of Violence	Carl Fogarty	David Cronenberg		
2006	Two Tickets to Paradise	Melville	D.B. Sweeney		
2006	Copying Beethoven	Ludwig van Beethoven	Agnieszka Holland		
2007	Gone Baby Gone	Det. Remy Bressant	Ben Affleck		
2007	Cleaner	Det. Edward "Eddie" Lorenzo	Renny Harlin		
2007	National Treasure: Book of Secrets	Mitch Wilkinson	Jon Turteltaub		
2008	Touching Home	Charlie Winston	Logan Miller; Noah Miller		
2008	Appaloosa	Virgil Cole	Himself	Also writer and producer	
2010	Once Fallen	Liam Ryan	Ash Adams		
2010	The Way Back	Mr. Smith	Peter Weir		
2010	Virginia	Sheriff Dick Tipton	Dustin Lance Black		
2011	That's What I Am	Mr. Steven Simon	Michael Pavone		
2011	Salvation Boulevard	Dr. Peter Blaylock	George Ratliff		
2012	Man on a Ledge	David Englander	Asger Leth		
2013	Phantom	Dmitri "Demi" Zubov	Todd Robinson		
2013	Pain & Gain	Ed Du Bois, III	Michael Bay		
2013	Snowpiercer	Wilford	Bong Joon-ho		
2013	Sweetwater	Sheriff Cornelius Jackson	Logan Miller		
2013	The Face of Love	Tom Young / Garret Mathis	Arie Posin		
2013	Gravity	Mission Control	Alfonso Cuarón	Voice role	
2014	Planes: Fire & Rescue	Blade Ranger	Bobs Gannaway	Voice role	
2014	Frontera	Roy McNary	Michael Berry		
2015	Cymbeline	King Cymbeline	Michael Almereyda		
2015	Run All Night	Shawn Maguire	Jaume Collet-Serra		
2015	The Adderall Diaries	Neil Elliott	Pamela Romanowsky		
2016	In Dubious Battle	Joy	James Franco		
2016	Rules Don't Apply	Mr. Bransford	Warren Beatty		
2017	A Crooked Somebody	Sam Vaughn	Trevor White		
2017	Mother!	Man	Darren Aronofsky		
2017	Kodachrome	Ben	Mark Raso		
2017	Geostorm	Leonard Dekkom	Dean Devlin		
2019	The Last Full Measure	Ray Mott	Todd Robinson		
2020	Resistance	George S. Patton	Jonathan Jakubowicz		
2021	The Lost Daughter	Lyle	Maggie Gyllenhaal		
2022	Top Gun: Maverick	Rear Admiral Chester "Hammer" Cain	Joseph Kosinski		
2022	Get Away If You Can	Alan	Dominique Braun; Terence Martin		
2023	Downtown Owl	Horace Jones	Lily Rabe; Hamish Linklater		
2024	Love Lies Bleeding	Lou Sr.	Rose Glass		
2024	My Dead Friend Zoe	Dale	Kyle Hausmann-Stokes		
2024	Riff Raff	Vincent	Dito Montiel		
2025	Long Day's Journey into Night	James Tyrone	Jonathan Kent		
2025	The Tiger	Harlan	Spike Jonze; Halina Reijn		
2026	How to Make a Killing	Whitelaw Redfellow	John Patton Ford		
2026	The Dink	Chuck Boyd	Josh Greenbaum		
TBA	Ashley Wright †	Judge Allen	Logan Miller; Noah Miller	Post-production	

=== Television ===
Year	Title	Role	Notes	Ref.
1976	Gibbsville	Steve	1 episode	
1977	Delvecchio	Davey Bresnihan	1 episode	
1977	The Amazing Howard Hughes	Russ	Television film	
1978	The Rockford Files	Rudy Kempner	1 episode	
1978	David Cassidy: Man Undercover	Ben	1 episode	
1979	The Seekers	Lt. William Clark	Television film	
1979	Barnaby Jones	Glenn Morgan	1 episode	
1979–1981	Lou Grant	Warren	3 episodes	
1980	Paris	John Dantley	1 episode	
1980	The Aliens Are Coming	Chuck Polcheck	Television film	
1981	CHiPs	Lonny	1 episode	
1981	Hart to Hart	Arnold Harmon	1 episode	
1984	A Flash of Green	Jimmy Wing	Television film aired as an episode of American Playhouse	
1987	The Last Innocent Man	Harry Nash	Television film	
1992	Running Mates	Hugh Hathaway	Television film	
1994	The Stand	General William Starkey	Miniseries, 1 episode	
1995	Frasier	Guest Caller Rob	Voice role, 1 episode	
1996	Riders of the Purple Sage	Jim Lassiter	Television film; also executive producer	
2005	Empire Falls	Miles Roby	Miniseries, 2 episodes	
2006	The Armenian Genocide	Leslie Davis	Documentary	
2012	Game Change	John McCain	Television film	
2016–2022	Westworld	William / The Man in Black	Main role, 28 episodes	
2020	Impractical Jokers: Dinner Party	Himself	1 episode	
2024	Wyatt Earp and the Cowboy War	Narrator	Documentary series	
2026–present	Dutton Ranch	Everett McKinney	Main role	

=== Theater ===
Year	Title	Role	Theater	Ref.
1980	Sweet Bird of Youth	Chance Wayne	Gene Darnyasky Theater	
1983	Fool for Love	Eddie	Magic Theatre, Douglas Fairbanks Theater	
1986	Precious Sons	Fred	Longacre Theatre	
1994	Simpatico	Lyle Carter	The Public Theater	
1996	Taking Sides	Major Steve Arnold	Brooks Atkinson Theatre	
2003	Trumbo: Red, White and Blacklisted	Dalton Trumbo	Westside Theatre	
2006	Wrecks	Edward Carr	The Public Theater	
2013	The Jacksonian	Bill Perch	Theatre Row	
2016–2017	Buried Child	Dodge	The New Group, Off-Broadway, Trafalgar Studios, West End debut	
2018	Good for Otto	Dr. Robert Michaels	The New Group	
2019–2020	To Kill a Mockingbird	Atticus Finch	Shubert Theatre	
2026	Other Desert Cities	Lyman Wyeth	Hudson Theatre	

=== Video games ===
Year	Title	Voice Role	Ref.
2010	Call of Duty: Black Ops	Jason Hudson	
2014	Planes: Fire & Rescue: The Video Game	Blade Ranger	
