= Sundae in New York =

- Directed by: Jimmy Picker
- Produced by: Jimmy Picker
- Starring: Scott Record
- Production company: Motionpicker Productions
- Distributed by: Direct Cinema Limited
- Release date: 1983
- Running time: 4 minutes
- Country: United States
- Language: English

Sundae in New York is a 1983 American animated short film directed by Jimmy Picker and starring Scott Record.

== Summary ==
A variety show featuring caricatures of New York personalities including then mayor Ed Koch to the tune of Theme from New York, New York.

== Accolades ==
The film won the Academy Award for Best Animated Short Film at the 56th Academy Awards, beating out Mickey's Christmas Carol, the Disney animated short.

The Academy Film Archive preserved Sundae in New York in 2006.

== See also ==
- New York, New York - the 1977 Martin Scorsese film that the theme originated from
- Independent animation
- Indiewood
