= In the Nuclear Shadow: What Can the Children Tell Us? =

1983 film

- Directed by: Eric Thiermann
- Produced by: Vivienne Verdon-Roe and Ian Thiermann
- Cinematography: Eric Thiermann
- Music by: Linda Arnold
- Production company: Impact Productions
- Distributed by: The Video Project
- Release date: 1983
- Running time: 25 minutes
- Country: United States
- Language: English

In the Nuclear Shadow: What Can the Children Tell Us? is a 1983 American short documentary film directed by Eric Thiermann. It was nominated for an Academy Award for Best Documentary Short. The film includes interviews with youths discussing the nuclear threat, a first-hand account of the atomic destruction of Hiroshima, and excerpts of speeches by psychiatrists John E. Mack and Robert Jay Lifton.
