= You Are Free (film) =

1983 film

- Directed by: Dea Brokman; Ilene Landis
- Produced by: Dea Brokman; Ilene Landis
- Production company: Brokman/Landis
- Distributed by: Direct Cinema
- Release date: 1983
- Running time: 20 minutes
- Countries: West Germany; Canada; United States
- Language: German

You Are Free (German: Ihr zent frei) is a 1983 short documentary film directed by Dea Brokman, in which five former U.S. Servicemen and a prison camp survivor provide accounts of the liberation of the Nazi concentration camps in 1945. It was nominated for an Academy Award for Best Documentary Short.
