= Tom Scott (sound engineer) =

American sound engineer

- Born: Thomas Scott
- Occupation: Sound engineer
- Years active: 1979–1985

Thomas Scott is an American sound engineer. He has won two Academy Awards for Best Sound. From 1985 to 1992, he was the chief engineer of Skywalker Sound.

In February 2024, Scott and Tom Kobayashi won the Technical Grammy Award at the 66th Annual Grammy Awards. Scott and Kobayashi met at Lucasfilm's Skywalker Sound in 1985, as the company was completing its Skywalker post-production facilities in California. In 1992, Scott and Kobayashi founded the Entertainment Digital Network (EDnet), which used fiber-optic networks to transmit high-quality video and audio across long distances.

== Selected filmography ==
- The Right Stuff (1983)
- Amadeus (1984)
