= Will Staples =

American screenwriter

- Education: Princeton University
- Occupation: Screenwriter
- Years active: 2003–present

Will Staples is an American screenwriter, producer, and novelist. He is best known for his work on the video game Call of Duty: Modern Warfare 3, the films Without Remorse and Mission: Impossible – Rogue Nation, the television series The Right Stuff, and his novel, Animals.

== Career ==
In 2011, Staples and screenwriter Paul Haggis wrote the script for the video game, Call of Duty: Modern Warfare 3, which was the largest entertainment release in history at the time.

On October 25, 2013, Deadline announced that Ben Affleck and Warner Bros had hired Staples to write a geopolitical thriller about a team of mercenaries in Eastern Congo for Affleck to star in and direct. The following year, Warner announced that Staples had been hired to write a movie set in the world of illicit animal trafficking for Leonardo DiCaprio, Tom Hardy, and Tobey Maguire to produce and star in.

In May 2014, Staples was hired to rewrite Mission: Impossible – Rogue Nation.

In 2017, National Geographic announced that Staples would be creating The Right Stuff television series based on Tom Wolfe’s 1979 book The Right Stuff, with Leonardo DiCaprio executive producing. The series moved to Disney+ in 2020.

Will's first novel, Animals, a thriller about global animal trafficking, organized crime and a deadly pandemic, was released on March 30, 2021.

Two of his screenplays have appeared on The Black List, an annual list compiled by Hollywood executives of their favorite unproduced screenplays – once for his adaptation of the book King of Heists by J. North Conway, and again for Landslide, an adaptation of the book How to Break a Terrorist, co-written with Tony Camerino.

== Filmography ==
=== Film ===
Writer

- The Tiger Mafia (2016) (Also executive producer)
- Without Remorse (2021)
- Way of the Warrior Kid (2026)

Uncredited script revisions

- Mission: Impossible – Rogue Nation (2015)

=== Television ===
Writer

Year	Title	Notes
2017	Shooter	Episode "Remember the Alamo"
2020	The Right Stuff	Episode "Sierra Hotel" (Also executive producer)

Consulting producer

- Shooter (2017)
- Jack Ryan (2019)

=== Video game ===
Writer

- Lair (2007)
- Call of Duty: Modern Warfare 3 (2011)
- Need for Speed Rivals (2013)

Special thanks

- Call of Duty: Advanced Warfare (2012)
