= Robert Grossman (artist) =

American cartoonist

- Born: Robert Samuel Grossman; March 1, 1940; Brooklyn, New York, U.S.
- Died: March 15, 2018 (aged 78)
- Education: Yale University; Joseph Grossman (father, display artist); Museum of Modern Art (art classes)
- Known for: Illustration; Caricature; Comic strips Painting; Sculpture; Filmmaking
- Website: http://robertgrossman.com

Robert Samuel Grossman (March 1, 1940 – March 15, 2018) was an American painter, sculptor, filmmaker, comics artist, illustrator and author. He is a member of The Society of Illustrators' Hall of Fame.

In a career spanning fifty years, Grossman's illustrations have appeared over 500 times on the covers of various national publications. TIME, Newsweek, Rolling Stone, Esquire, TV Guide, Sports Illustrated, The Times, The Nation, The New York Observer, The Atlantic Monthly, The New Republic, Evergreen Review, New York magazine, National Lampoon, and The New York Times have all published illustrations by him. Grossman's work has appeared in children's books, including The 18th Emergency (text by Betsy C. Byers), and What Could a Hippopotamus Be? (text by Mike Thaler). He has created album covers for Columbia, Epic, Warner Bros., and United Artists.

== Education and early career ==
Grossman's father, Joseph Grossman, was a display artist who gave his son his earliest training. The elder Grossman also sent Robert to Saturday morning art classes at the Museum of Modern Art, in Manhattan, NYC. He was Jewish.

Grossman graduated from Midwood High School in 1957. He then attended Yale University, where he served as a cartoonist, illustrator and editor of The Yale Record, "America's Oldest College Humor Magazine" (it predates the Harvard Lampoon by four years), and in 1961 graduated with a Bachelor of Arts degree in Fine Arts.

A Yale Record parody of The New Yorker (called The Yew Norker) led to an introduction to art director Jim Geraghty, and an art editor position at the weekly. During this period, Grossman created "Captain Melanin," "the world's first African-American superhero," for the satirical journal Monocle.

In 1963, Grossman began a freelance illustration career. In 1979, Galerie Vontobel of Zurich, Switzerland showcased Grossman's art in a solo exhibition.

== Best-known work ==
Grossman created the familiar airplane tied in a knot for the 1980 film comedy AIRPLANE!.

For the 1970 comedy recording Don't Crush That Dwarf, Hand Me the Pliers, Grossman painted a quartet of caricatures of The Firesign Theatre. The painting depicts the players as animal / human hybrids, with the animal portions signifying each member's Zodiacal sign (each was born under a Fire Sign).

Rolling Stone magazine issued a series of posters featuring Grossman's cover paintings of George W. Bush, Richard Nixon, Bob Dylan, The Who, Jerry Garcia, and Crosby Stills and Nash.

== Painter ==
Throughout his career, Grossman employed an airbrush (he favored compressed air over piston) in order to render the sculptural forms which are his paintings' most readily identified characteristic. Since with an airbrush a skilled user may lay in areas of shadow and light with either crisp or soft edges, the shapes possess a high degree of visual verisimilitude. Grossman is sometimes credited with spearheading a resurgence of the tool in illustration; for decades it had been used primarily for photo retouching. Pete Hamill writing in the international journal of visual communication Graphis and Steven Heller in Innovators of American Illustration note that Grossman's approach to the airbrush has been widely imitated. His "mordant wit" is never duplicated, adds Heller.

On the evolution of technique in his illustration, Grossman said, "I was impressed by the way David Levine and the Push Pin artists were using line to develop a bulgy three-dimensional feeling in their work. I found an old airbrush in my dad's shop and discovered a jiffy way to outbulge them all. For a while I diligently pursued outline-less-ness as the secret to a real stereoscopic three-dimensional look. I felt my line work belonged to a different world that had nothing to do with the airbrush and went its separate way. Lately I find a strong line reasserting itself in my pictures."

== Sculptor ==
The understanding of form and volume which informs his two-dimensional work finds further expression in an ongoing series of sculptural busts (many of which can be viewed at Grossman's portfolio website). Unlike most sculpture, they are not intended to be walked around, but are constructed to be photographed from a single point, under particular lighting, printed, and shown to a mass audience. Grossman sculpts these in red modeling clay, then brings a painterly understanding of color to their multi-hued veneers. Unlike his paintings, which may take on any subject, the sculptures have been primarily a medium for Grossman's caricatures.

== Filmmaker ==
Grossman received a 1977 Academy Awards nomination for "Best Animated Short Film" for Jimmy the C (James Picker, Robert Grossman and Craig Whitaker, producers; Motionpicker Productions). The three-minute film features a clay-animated Jimmy Carter singing "Georgia on My Mind". Ray Charles' rendition of the song is used on the soundtrack.

During the 1980s, Grossman and his brother David produced a number of animated television commercials under the "Grossman Brothers" banner. One air-conditioner ad featured a miserable, suddenly melting pet dog. A pair of singing cupids were the centerpiece of ads for a New York radio station specializing in love songs. A dancing piggy bank performed juggling feats for a local bank. Grossman's preferred technique has been replacement animation, in which separate puppets (or parts of puppets) are sculpted to represent each increment of action. A single character might have dozens of different heads, enabling the expression of any desired word or emotion. The technique was used on The Nightmare Before Christmas.

== Cartoonist ==
Grossman has written and drawn multipanel comics throughout his career. The pen and ink strips have appeared in New York magazine, The Nation, The New Yorker, The New York Observer and elsewhere. Many of them are written entirely in verse: "The Man Who Bagged Baghdad for Dad" deals with the current war in Iraq. New York Magazine hosted his "Waterbugs" cartoons during the unfolding of the Watergate scandal. It featured Richard M. Nightcrawler, an insect with henchmen named Haldebug and Ehrlichbug. This grew into the Zoonooz cartoon, which featured a president prone to bumping his head called Gerald Duck, and a Mickey-Mouse-stye movie star Ronald Rodent. Rolling Stone hosted the regular feature ZooNooz, in which animals enacted a satirical version of current political events.

In June 2008, The New York Times published a discussion with Grossman of his political comic strips, which date back to the Kennedy administration. The profile appeared concurrently with the launch of "O-MANLAND," an online compilation of strips focusing on the 2008 presidential race. The site is named after "O-Man," Barack Obama's Grossman-invented alter ego, whose superpowers and charisma know no bounds. The artist collaborated with veteran record producer and musician John Simon on a theme song for the site. He also made Twump & Pooty (2017), a webcomic satirizing Donald Trump and Vladimir Putin.

== Author ==
An occasional essayist, Grossman shared with readers of The Nation his reflections on Art Spiegelman's now-classic graphic novel Maus: "[S]oon one is marveling at the amount of fear, hope, love and pathos that can emerge from a sketch of a mouse's head scarcely a half-inch high. ... [Spiegelman] promises us a sequel and I, for one, can't wait. I hope he is scurrying. The most affecting and successful narrative ever done about the Holocaust." A graphic novel, based on the famous New York Sun's “Great Moon Hoax,” titled "Life on the Moon", was published posthumously in May, 2019. The book was nominated for an Eisner Award in 2020.

== Personal life ==
Grossman's first marriage, to Donna Lundvall in 1964, ended in divorce in 1980. His second marriage, to Vicki Anne Morgan, ended in divorce in 1987. His survivors include his partner of 24 years, Elaine Louie; son Alex Emanuel Grossman, an actor, musician and filmmaker, and daughter Leila Suzanna Grossman, a photographer, who together run his website. Alex is in the process of creating a documentary about his father.
