= Tessa Davies =

English set decorator

- Born: 1940
- Died: 1 June 1988 (aged 47–48); Frogmill Spinney, England
- Cause of death: Bludgeoning
- Occupation: Set decorator
- Years active: 1966–1988

Tessa Davies (1940 – 1 June 1988) was an English set decorator. She carried the suffix MCSD as she was a member of the Chartered Society of Designers. She was nominated for an Academy Award in the category Best Art Direction for the film Yentl. She was bludgeoned to death.

== Selected filmography ==
- Yentl (1983)
