= Leslie Tomkins =

English art director

- Born: 1948 (age 77–78); Hammersmith, London, England
- Occupation: Art director
- Years active: 1977-2005

Leslie Tomkins (born 1948) is an English art director. He was nominated for an Academy Award in the category Best Art Direction for the film Yentl.

== Selected filmography ==
- Yentl (1983)
