= Jim Poynter =

American set decorator

- Born: October 13, 1943 (age 81); San Francisco, California, U.S.
- Occupation: Set decorator
- Years active: 1981-2004

Jim Poynter (born October 13, 1943) is an American set decorator. He was nominated for an Academy Award in the category Best Art Direction for the film The Right Stuff.

== Selected filmography ==
- The Right Stuff (1983)
