= Peter R. Romero =

American art director (1920–2010)

- Born: February 18, 1920
- Died: July 29, 2010 (aged 90)
- Occupation: Art director
- Years active: 1976–1994

Peter R. Romero (February 18, 1920 – July 29, 2010) was an art director. He was nominated for an Academy Award in the category Best Art Direction for the film The Right Stuff.

== Selected filmography ==
- The Right Stuff (1983)
