= Richard Lawrence (art director) =

Art director

- Occupation: Art director
- Years active: 1976-2008

Richard Lawrence is an art director. He was nominated for an Academy Award in the category Best Art Direction for the film The Right Stuff.

== Selected filmography ==
- The Shootist (1976)
- The Right Stuff (1983)
- Crimson Tide (1995)
- Volcano (1997)
- Lost in Space (1998)
