= Gresham =

Gresham may refer to:

== Places ==
=== Australia ===
- Gresham County, New South Wales

=== United Kingdom ===
- Gresham, Norfolk

=== United States ===
- Auburn Gresham, Chicago, Illinois
  - Gresham station
- Gresham, Missouri
- Gresham, Nebraska
- Gresham, Oregon
- Gresham, Texas
- Gresham, Wisconsin

== Buildings ==
- Gresham Court Hotel, Bournemouth, England
- Gresham Hotel, Dublin, Ireland
- Gresham Palace, Budapest, Hungary
- Gresham (Edgewater, Maryland)

== Educational establishments ==
- Gresham College, London, England
- Gresham's School, Norfolk, England
- Gresham Middle School (Tennessee), Fountain City, Knoxville, Tennessee, U.S.
- Gresham High School (Oregon), U.S.

== Other uses ==
- Gresham (surname)
- Gresham's law, in economics
- USCGC Gresham, a series of boats
- Gresham Technologies plc

== See also ==
- Grisham (disambiguation)
- Grissom (disambiguation)
