= Grissom =

Grissom may refer to:

- Grissom, North Carolina, unincorporated community
- Grissom (surname)
  - Gus Grissom, one of the original NASA Project Mercury astronauts and pilot of Gemini 3
  - Gil Grissom, fictional character in the television series CSI: Crime Scene Investigation

== Astronomical entities ==
- Grissom (crater), a lunar crater that lies on the far side of the Moon
- Grissom Hill, one of the three Apollo 1 Hills on the planet Mars
- 2161 Grissom, an asteroid

== Institutions ==
- Grissom Air Museum, an aerospace museum in Peru, Indiana, United States
- Grissom Joint Air Reserve Base, formerly Grissom Air Force Base
- Virgil I. Grissom High School, a high school in Huntsville, Alabama, United States; named in honor of the astronaut

== Fictional characters ==
- Carl Grissom, a fictional character and an adversary of Batman in the 1989 Batman film; played by Jack Palance
- Cyrus "The Virus" Grissom, a fictional character in film Con Air
- Gil Grissom, a fictional character from the TV series CSI: Crime Scene Investigation

== Other ==
- Robert Grissom Parkway, a major four-lane connector highway in Myrtle Beach, South Carolina, United States
- Island Grissom, one of the four THUMS Islands off Long Beach, California, United States

== See also ==
- The Grissom Gang, a 1971 American period gangster film directed and produced by Robert Aldrich
- Grisham (disambiguation)
- Gresham (disambiguation)
