= Grisham (surname) =

Grisham is a surname. Notable people with the surname include:

== People ==
- Charles Grisham, biochemist and professor
- Hannah Grisham (born 2000), American racing driver
- Jack Grisham (born 1961), American rock vocalist, musician, raconteur and political activist
- Jim Grisham (1942–2012), American football player
- John Grisham (born 1955), American novelist
- Michelle Lujan Grisham (born 1959), American lawyer and politician; 32nd Governor of New Mexico
- Reggie Grisham, an American horn player
- Sadie Park Grisham (1859–1928), educator and municipal public office-holder
- Stephanie Grisham (born 1976), American former White House official
- Todd Grisham (born 1976), American sports reporter and presenter
- Trent Grisham (born 1996), American baseball player
- Tyler Grisham (born 1987), American football player
- Wayne R. Grisham (1923–2011), American politician
- Cassie Grisham, contestant on America's Next Top Model (season 3)

=== Fictional characters ===
- Kate Grisham, character in the 1997 British science fiction detective TV series Crime Traveller

== See also ==
- Grisham (disambiguation)
