= Grissom (surname) =

Grissom is a surname. Notable people bearing it include:

- Barry Grissom (born 1954), former U.S. Attorney
- Betty Grissom (1927–2018), American plaintiff
- Clayton Holmes Grissom (born 1978), American pop singer Clay Aiken, made famous by American Idol
- Cory Grissom (born 1990), American football player
- Daniel M. Grissom (1829–1930), American journalist
- David Grissom (fl. from 1978), American session guitarist
- Geneo Grissom (born 1992), American football player
- Gus Grissom (1926–1967), the second American astronaut to fly in space; killed in the Apollo 1 accident
- Irene Welch Grissom (1873–1965), American poet
- Janet G. Mullins Grissom (1949–2023), American lobbyist
- Lauren Grissom (born 1985), American beauty queen
- Lee Grissom (1907–1998), American baseball player
- Marquis Grissom (born 1967), American baseball player and coach
- Marquis Grissom Jr. (born 2001), American baseball player
- Marv Grissom (1918–2005), American baseball pitcher and coach
- Richard Grissom (born 1960), American serial killer
- Steve Grissom (born 1963), American stock car racing driver
- Toney Grissom (born 1837/38), American Baptist minister, farmer and politician
- Vaughn Grissom (born 2001), American baseball player

== Fictional characters ==
- Carl Grissom, a character and crime lord in Batman
- Gil Grissom of CSI: Crime Scene Investigation
- Cyrus Grissom of Con Air
