= Gresham (surname) =

Gresham is a surname.

== People with the surname ==
- Sir Edward Gresham, 2nd Baronet (1649–1709), English politician
- Diane Guthrie-Gresham (born 1971), Jamaican track and field athlete
- Douglas Gresham (born 1945), British film producer
- Gloria Gresham (born 1946), American costume designer
- Grits Gresham (1922–2008), American sportsman
- James Gresham (disambiguation)
- Jermaine Gresham (born 1988), American football player
- Sir John Gresham (1495–1556), Lord Mayor of London and founder of Gresham's School
- Joy Gresham (1915–1960), poet married to C. S. Lewis
- Karen Gresham, American politician
- Peter Gresham (born 1933), New Zealand politician
- Sir Richard Gresham (1494–1549), merchant
- Suzette Gresham, American chef
- Sir Thomas Gresham (c. 1519 – 1579), after whom Gresham's law is named, founder of Gresham College
- Tony Gresham (1940–2025), Australian amateur golfer
- Walter Q. Gresham (1832–1895), American statesman and jurist
- William Lindsay Gresham (1909–1962), American author
- William Gresham, (1870 – after 1894), English footballer

== See also ==
- Gresham
