= Twin Caves =

Cave entrances in Indiana

Coordinates: 38°43′27.7″N 86°24′36.0″W

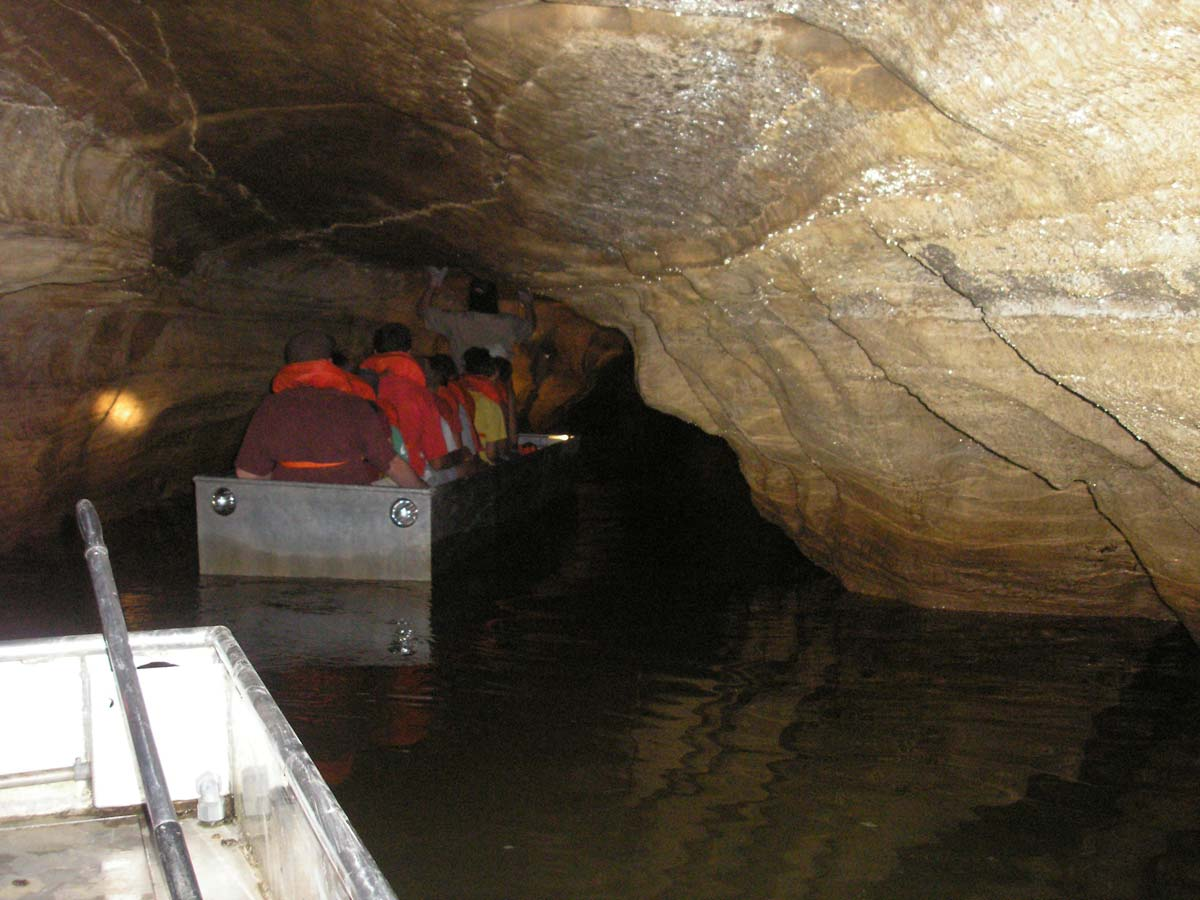
Twin Caves boat tour

Twin Caves is a pair of cave entrances connected by a short river at the bottom of a sinkhole within the boundaries of Spring Mill State Park in Lawrence County, Indiana, United States. The river is an exposed section of a mostly-underground stream that originates as Mosquito Creek several miles southeast of the park, which sinks into the Upper Twin Cave system. The stream then comes out briefly at Twin Caves, and flows into the Lower Twin Cave, re-emerging briefly at Bronson Cave shortly to the northwest, then flowing into the Shawnee Cave System. The stream finally emerges at the Donaldson Cave entrance as a short tributary of Mill Creek, still within the park.

The park offers boat tours from Twin Caves, into the southern cave entrance (Upper Twin Cave). The tours last 20 minutes and go upstream about 500 feet (150 m) into the cave, then turn around due to the rest of the cave system belonging to the Indiana Karst Conservancy. The tours are operated by the Indiana Department of Natural Resources and are seasonal from Memorial Day to October.

The Shawnee (Bronson-Donaldson) Cave and Upper Twin Cave have reopened to registered groups, after a closure of several years due to white nose syndrome (WNS).
