= Spring Mill State Park =

State park in Indiana, United States

- IUCN category III (natural monument or feature)
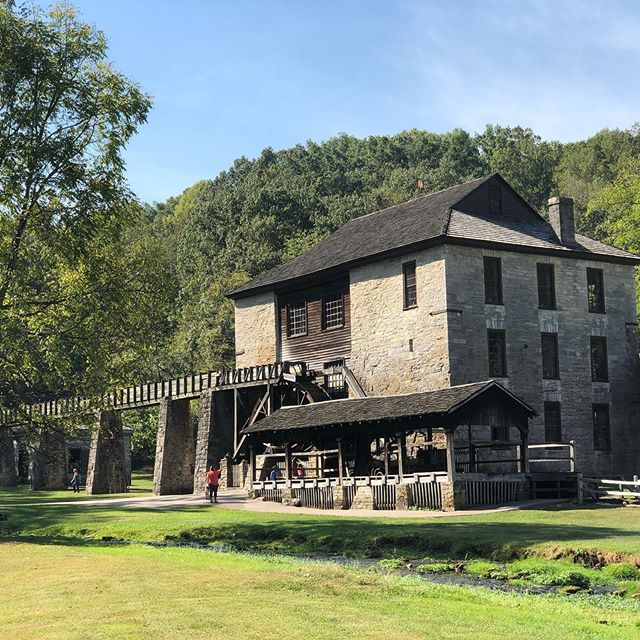
- The watermill in the pioneer village

- Location within Indiana
- Location: Lawrence County, Indiana, U.S.
- Nearest city: Mitchell, Indiana
- Coordinates: 38°44′00″N 86°25′12″W
- Area: 1,358 acres (5.50 km^{2})
- Visitors: 675,880 (in 2018–19)
- Governing body: Indiana Department of Natural Resources

Spring Mill State Park is a 1,358-acre (5 km^{2}) state park in the state of Indiana, United States. The park is located south of Bloomington, about 3 miles (5 km) east of the city of Mitchell on Indiana State Road 60. Established in 1927, it contains a settler's village, the Gus Grissom Memorial (with the accompanying Gemini 3 space capsule), a nature center, and campgrounds.

The park is located on the Mitchell Karst Plain, which allowed the park's caves and sinkholes to form in the limestone. The caves include Bronson Cave, Twin Caves, Shawnee Cave (also known as Donaldson Cave), Hamer Cave, and others. A boat tour of Twin Caves is run by the Indiana Department of Natural Resources, which travels about 500 feet (150 m) into the cave.

A portion of the park is virgin timber, protected in the Donaldson Woods Nature Preserve. The Mitchell Karst Plain Nature Preserve is notable for its large number of sinkholes, more than 1000 per square mile. Many of the park's features were constructed by the Civilian Conservation Corps in the 1930s, including the Spring Mill Inn, Spring Mill Lake, and most of the trails. The park attracts about 675,000 visitors annually.

The park is one of 14 Indiana State Parks that were in the path of totality for the 2024 solar eclipse, with the park experiencing 3 minutes and 21 seconds of totality.

== Pioneer village ==
A reconstructed pioneer village lies within the park, featuring a historic watermill and 19 other structures. It was the site of the original Spring Mill Village that developed around the mill from which it took its name, powered by a stream that arises from a spring in Hamer Cave. Heritage interpreters demonstrate crafts and skills from the 1860s. The Hamer Cemetery is located south of the village. This 295-acre (1.19 km^{2}) area was purchased from a cement company for a single dollar in 1923. Restoration of the village was spearheaded by Richard Lieber and E. Y. Guernsey (employed by Indiana's Department of Conservation) in the late 1920s and early 1930s, using some original structures and other buildings brought from other parts of the state.

== Gus Grissom Memorial ==
Also of interest is a memorial to Mitchell, Indiana-native, Gus Grissom, one of the original Mercury Seven astronauts, and who died in the Apollo 1 accident. The memorial features the spacecraft from Grissom's Gemini 3 space flight, nicknamed by Grissom the Molly Brown (after the play The Unsinkable Molly Brown), as well as a short video about the life of Grissom and artifacts such as a spacesuit, helmet, and many personal effects.

== Other ==
A nature center is open from spring through fall and features live snakes, a bird-watching window, natural history displays, and a children's area. During the winter, a small "nature nook" is available instead the Spring Mill Inn.

The campground features 188 Class A campsites with 30-amp electric service, a fire ring, and a picnic table for each site. Thirty-five primitive campsites and youth camping are also available. Four "comfort stations" are located in the campground, which includes modern plumbing, restrooms, and showers. A camp store is accessible from both inside and outside the campground.

== In popular culture ==
The park was the subject of a Rescue 911 segment that aired on October 17, 1989, about a man who became trapped in Donaldson Cave and was later rescued.

== Gallery ==
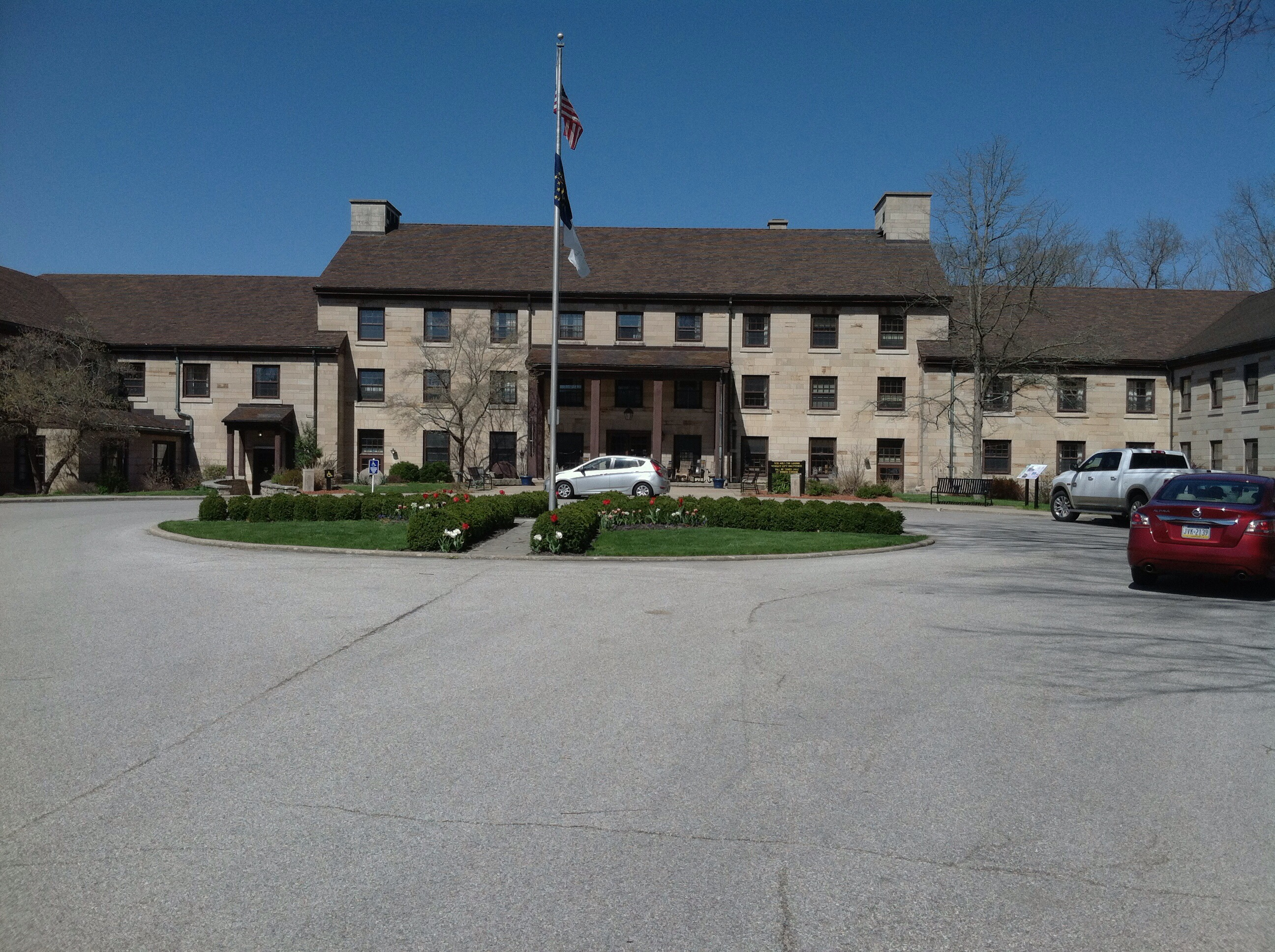
Spring Mill Inn

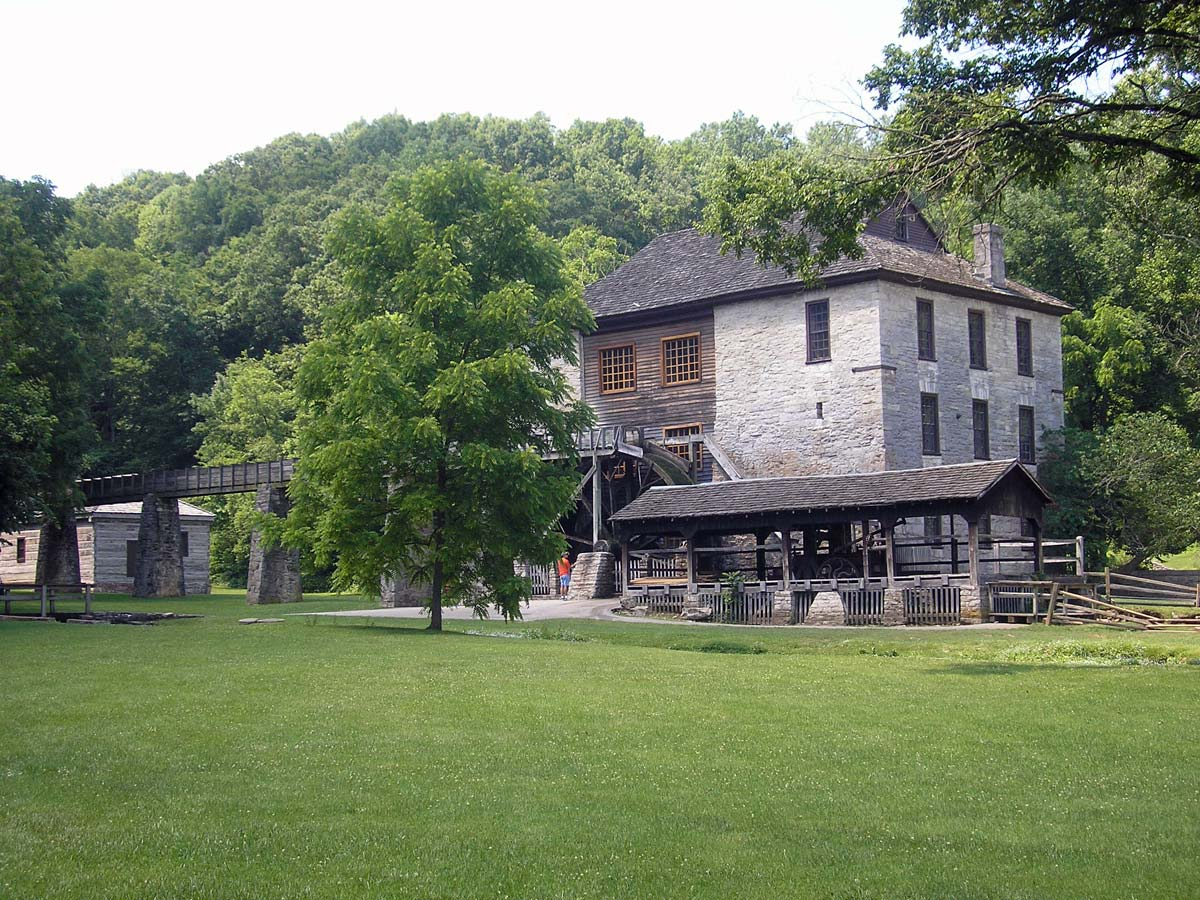
Water Mill at Spring Mill State Park

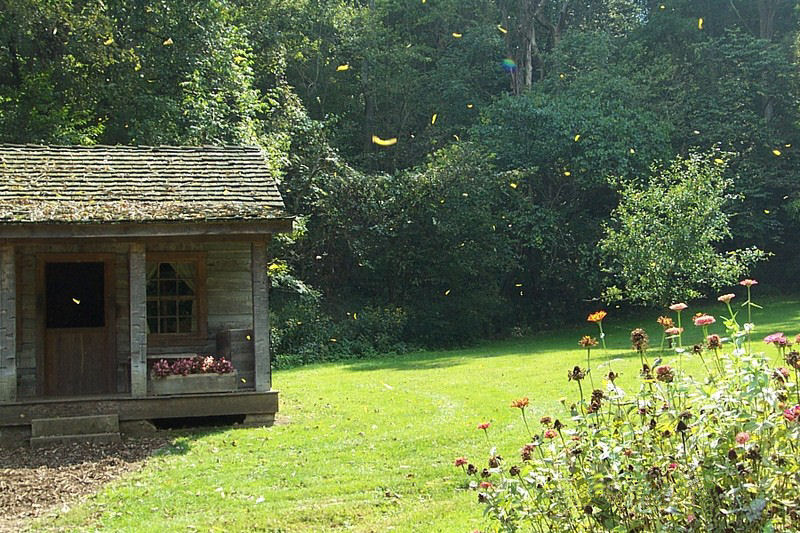
Small village house overlooking north village garden in summer 2004

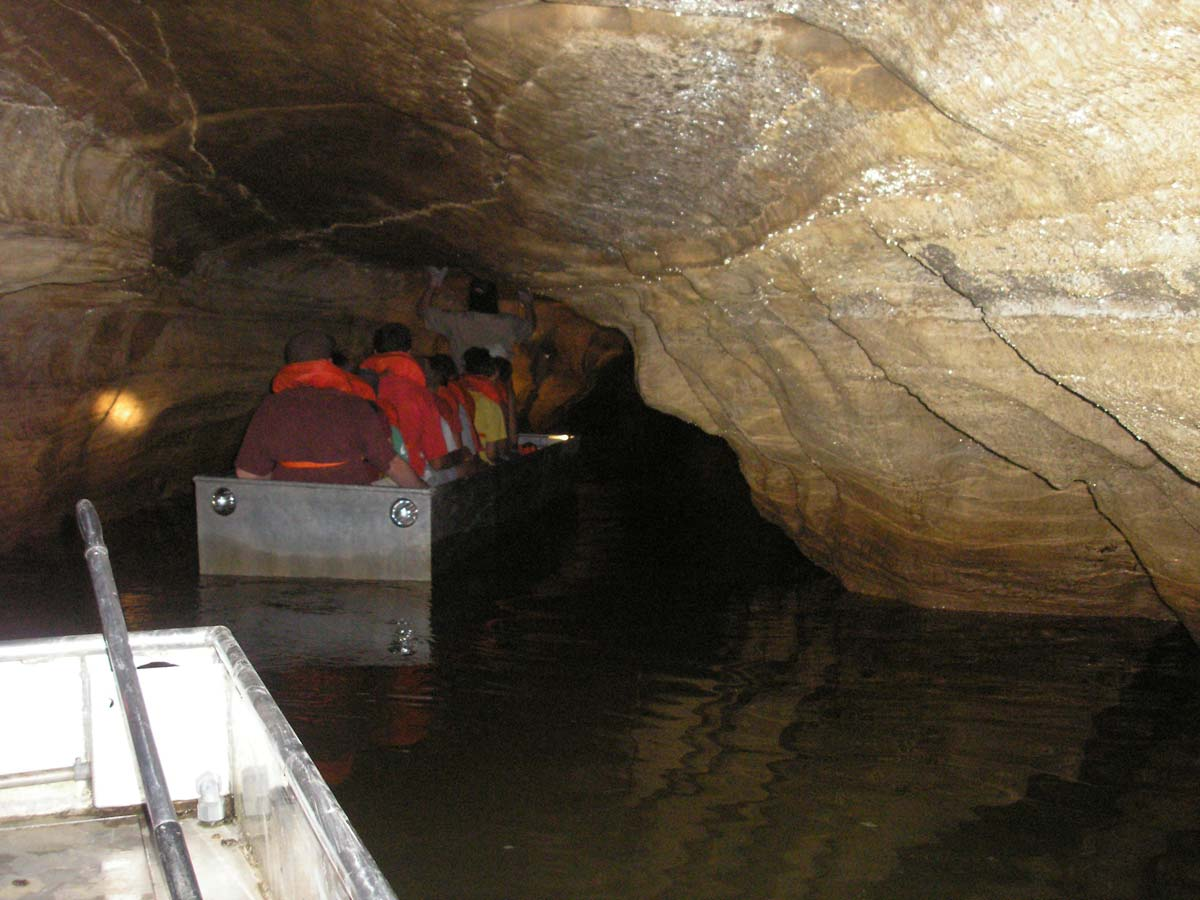
Twin Caves boat tour

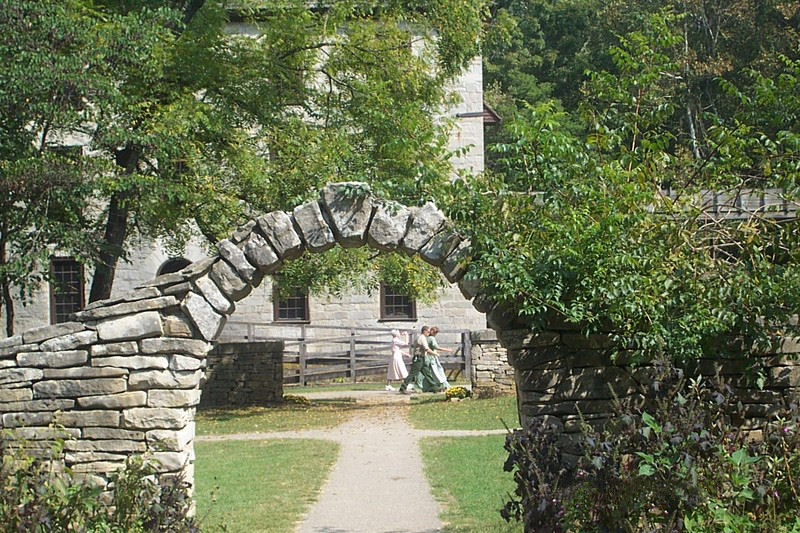
Amish family members walking through Spring Mill village

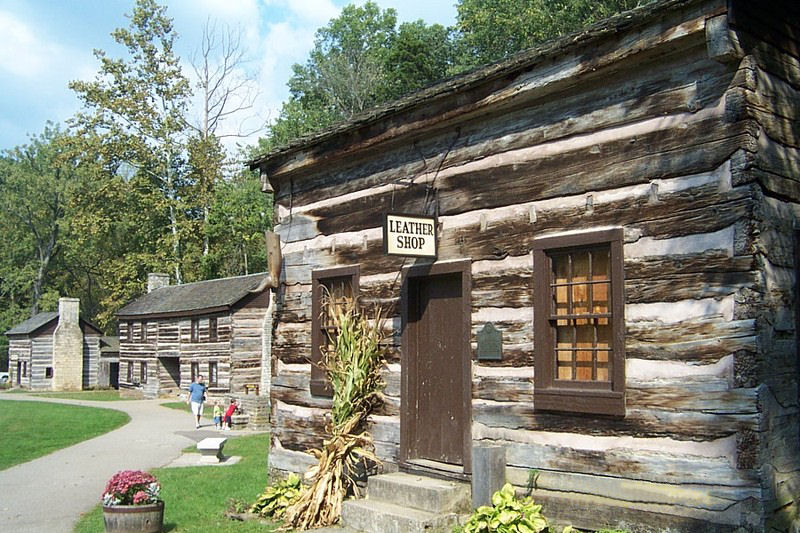
Village leather shop

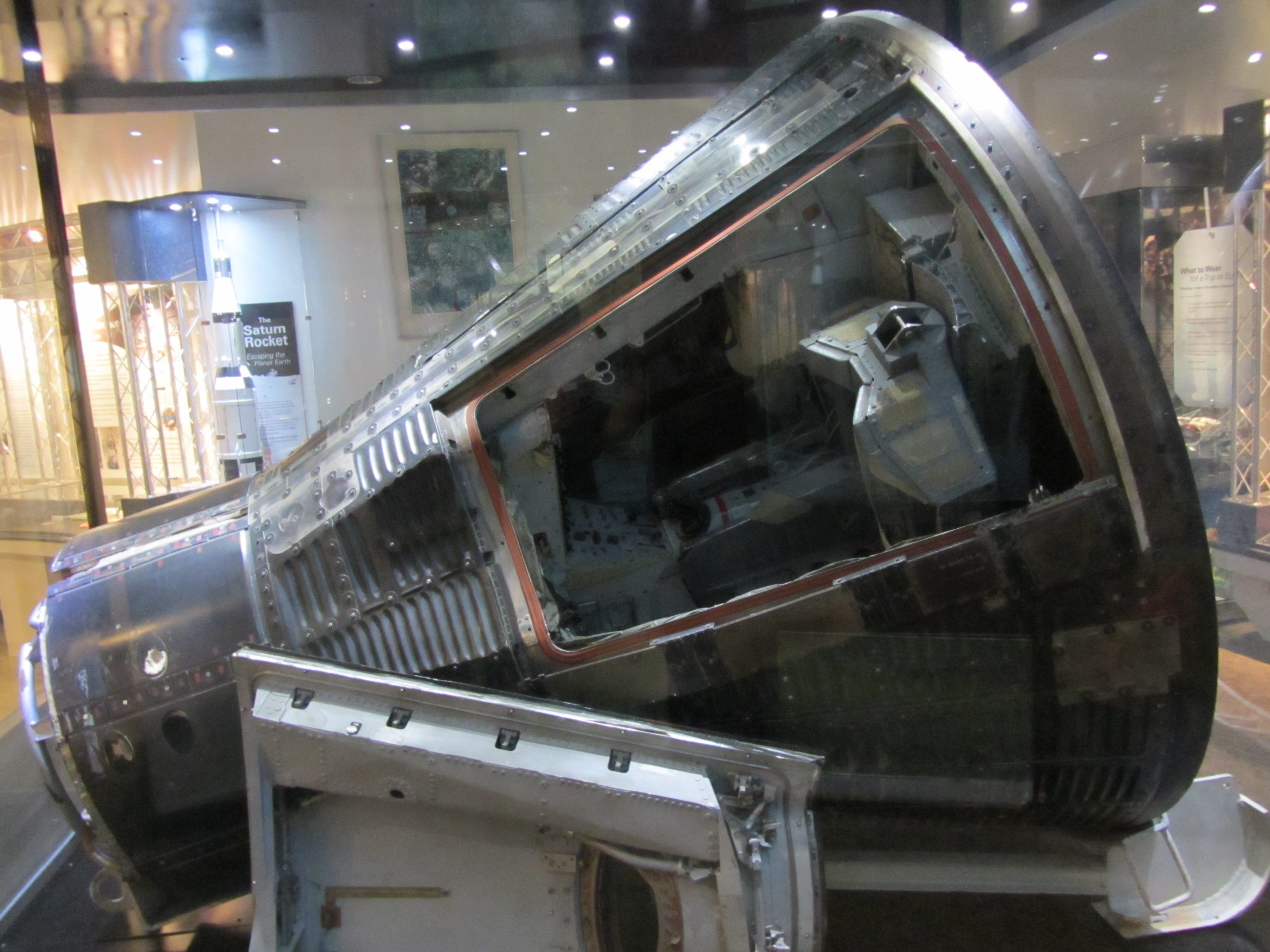
Gus Grissom and John Young's Gemini 3 capsule, nicknamed Molly Brown
