= Grisham (disambiguation) =

John Grisham (born 1955) is an American novelist, attorney, politician, and activist.

Grisham may also refer to:

== People ==
- Grisham (surname), for people with the surname

== Places and other uses ==
- Grisham Stadium, a multi-purpose stadium in Carrollton, Georgia, U.S.
- Grisham Township, Montgomery County, Illinois, U.S.
- Noel Grisham Middle School, Austin, Texas, U.S.

== See also ==
- Grissom (disambiguation)
- Gresham (disambiguation)
