= Shawnee Cave =

Cave in Indiana

Coordinates: 38°43′49.4″N 86°24′55.0″W

Shawnee Cave (also called Donaldson Cave or Donaldson-Bronson Cave) is located in Spring Mill State Park in the state of Indiana. Access to the cave is controlled by the Indiana Department of Natural Resources.

Shawnee Cave is the last of three underground passages, totaling just over 8,000 feet, of a stream that originates southeast of the park, and flows through Twin Caves and Bronson Cave, within the park. Shawnee Cave can be entered through the Bronson Cave Entrance and exited via the Donaldson Entrance. The passage connecting Twin Caves to Bronson Cave is extremely dangerous and is off limits.

The Indiana DNR has lifted the ban on access to the cave, that was previously imposed to battle White nose syndrome, which is contracted by bats. Access to Shawnee cave is arranged through the Indiana Karst Conservancy via their web page.

Under the name of Donaldson Cave System, Shawnee Cave is a National Natural Landmark.
