= James Gresham =

James Gresham may refer to:

- James Gresham (poet), 17th-century English poet
- James Gresham (MP), 17th-century English Member of Parliament for Haslemere
- James Gresham (footballer), English footballer active in the 1890s
- James Bethel Gresham (1893–1917), American serviceman killed in World War I
- Jimmy Gresham (born 1934), singer and writer

== See also ==
- James Gresham Barrett, American politician
