= Sadie Park Grisham =

American educator and politician (1859–1928)

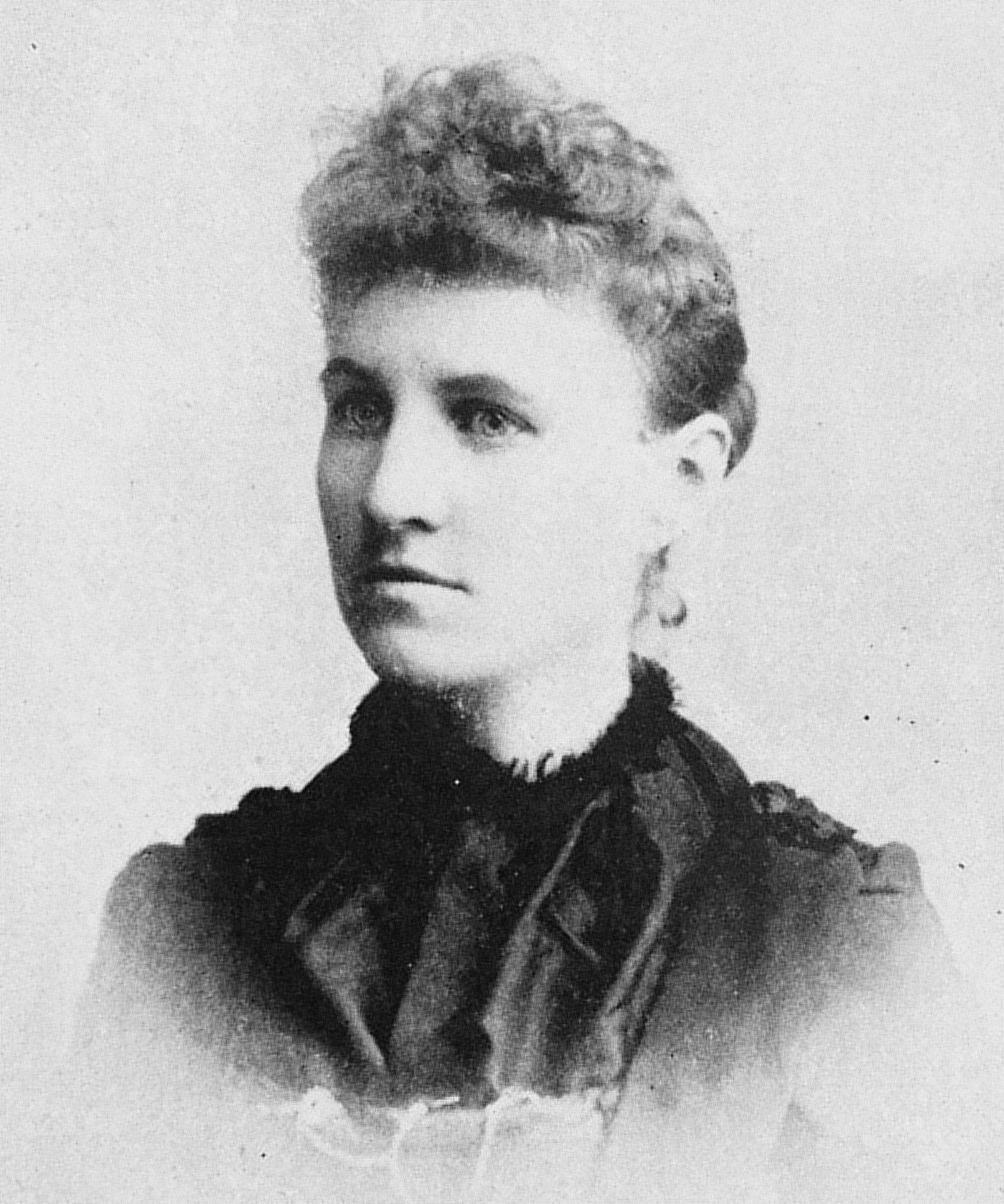
Sadie Park Grisham

Sadie Park Grisham (July 22, 1859 - November 10, 1928) was an educator and municipal public office-holder.

== Early life ==
Friday was born in Litchfield Township, Bradford County, Pennsylvania, on July 22, 1859. She was a direct descendant of Thomas Park and was the daughter of J. P. and Jane A. Park. In 1870 her father moved with his family to Kansas and settled on Middle creek, in Chase County, Kansas.

Grisham went to the State Normal School in Emporia, Kansas, graduating in 1882.

== Career ==
After graduation, Grisham engaged in school teaching, until December 1882, when she married Thomas Henry Grisham (1849-1918), a lawyer of Cottonwood Falls, Kansas, who was at that time the prosecuting attorney of Chase county.

In 1886, Grisham accepted a position in the public schools of Cottonwood Falls. In 1890, she was employed as principal, with a corps of seven teachers. In the spring of 1889, she was elected a member of the common council of Cottonwood Falls. She was made president of the council and chairman of the committee on streets and alleys.

== Personal life ==
She died on November 10, 1928, and is buried at Prairie Grove Cemetery, Cottonwood Falls, with her husband.
