= James Gresham (poet) =

English poet

James Gresham (fl. 1626) was an English poet.

Gresham published in 1626 The Picture of Incest: liuely portraicted in the historie of Cinyras and Myrrha, 12mo. This poem, written in heroic couplets, is a translation from book x. of Ovid's ‘Metamorphoses,’ and is a satisfactory performance. A reprint from the one known copy of the original edition, which is in the British Museum Library, was made by the Rev. A.B. Grosart (1876). Gresham may be identical with the James Gresham who in 1631 married the widow of Roger Hurst, a brewer, and five years later petitioned the king for protection against the creditors of Hurst's estate.
