= Toney Grissom =

American politician

Toney Grissom or Tony Grissom was a Baptist minister, farmer, and state legislator in Arkansas. His employer owed him money after he left and then had him "silenced" from preaching after Grissom sued him for it. A Republican, he represented Phillips County, Arkansas for two terms in the Arkansas House of Representatives from 1873 until 1875.

The House was in session from January 6 to April 25 during his first term in 1873. He also served as assessor in Phillips County in 1875. He was relatively prosperous and 32 years old in 1870.
