= Gresham, Missouri =

Extinct hamlet in Missouri, U.S.

Coordinates: 37.4253213°N 93.3993615°W

Gresham is an extinct town in Polk County, in the U.S. state of Missouri.

A post office called Gresham was established in 1885, and remained in operation until 1900. The community has the name of Walter Q. Gresham, 33rd United States Secretary of State.
