= Charles Grisham =

American biochemist

Charles M. Grisham is a biochemist and a professor of chemistry at the University of Virginia in Charlottesville, Virginia. He received his B.S. from the Illinois Institute of Technology and his Ph.D. in chemistry from the University of Minnesota. Grisham is a Research Career Development Awardee of the National Institutes of Health and is a member of the American Society for Biochemistry and Molecular Biology.

Grisham has co-authored the textbook entitled Biochemistry with Reginald H. Garrett.
