= USCGC Gresham =

USCGC Gresham has been the name of more than one cutter of the United States Revenue Cutter Service or United States Coast Guard:

- USCGC Gresham (WPG-85), in commission in the United States Revenue Cutter Service 1897–1915 and with the United States Coast Guard 1915–1917, 1919–1935, and 1943–1944: later as the SS HaTikva
- USCGC Gresham (WAVP-387), later WHEC-387, later WAGW-387, in commission in the United States Coast Guard from 1947 to 1973
