= Gus Grissom =

American astronaut (1926–1967)

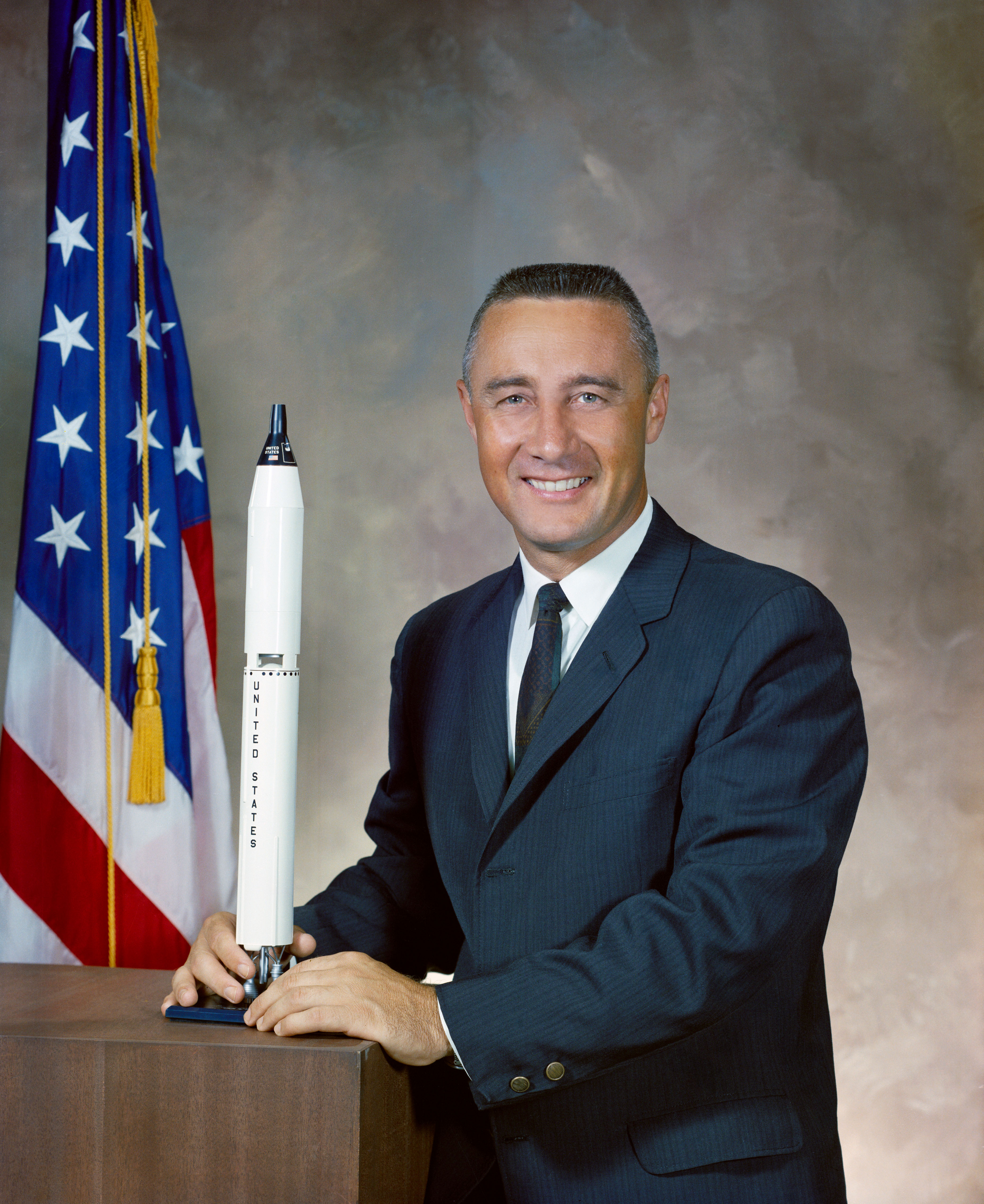
- Grissom in 1964
- Born: Virgil Ivan Grissom; April 3, 1926; Mitchell, Indiana, U.S.
- Died: January 27, 1967 (aged 40); Cape Kennedy, Florida, U.S.
- Resting place: Arlington National Cemetery
- Education: Purdue University (BS); Air University (BS)
- Spouse: Betty Lavonne Moore (m. 1945)
- Children: 2
- Awards: Distinguished Flying Cross; Congressional Space Medal of Honor; NASA Distinguished Service Medal
- Space career

NASA astronaut
- Rank: Lieutenant Colonel, USAF
- Time in space: 5h 7m
- Selection: NASA Group 1 (1959)
- Mission: Mercury-Redstone 4; Gemini 3; Apollo 1
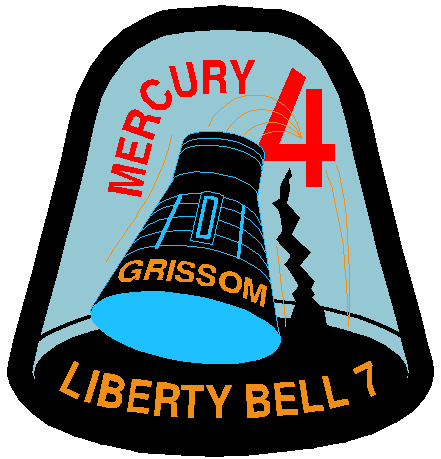
- Mission insignia

Virgil Ivan "Gus" Grissom (April 3, 1926 – January 27, 1967) was an American astronaut, and one of the original Mercury Seven selected by the National Aeronautics and Space Administration (NASA) for Project Mercury, a program to train and launch astronauts into outer space. Grissom went on to be a Project Gemini and Apollo program astronaut for NASA. As a member of the NASA Astronaut Corps, Grissom was the second American to fly in space in 1961. He was also the second American to fly in space twice, preceded only by Joe Walker with his sub-orbital X-15 flights.

Grissom was a World War II and Korean War veteran, mechanical engineer, and United States Air Force test pilot. He was a recipient of the Distinguished Flying Cross, the Air Medal with an oak leaf cluster, two NASA Distinguished Service Medals, and, posthumously, the Congressional Space Medal of Honor.

As commander of AS-204 (Apollo 1), Grissom died with astronauts Ed White and Roger B. Chaffee on January 27, 1967, during a pre-launch test for the Apollo 1 mission at Cape Kennedy, Florida.

== Early life ==
Virgil Ivan Grissom was born in the small town of Mitchell, Indiana, on April 3, 1926, to Dennis David Grissom, a signalman for the Baltimore and Ohio Railroad, and Cecile King Grissom, a homemaker. Virgil was the family's second child; his older sister, Lena, died a year prior to Gus' birth. He was followed by three younger siblings: a sister, Wilma, and two brothers, Norman and Lowell. Grissom started school at Riley grade school. His interest in flying began during that time, building model airplanes. He received his nickname when his friend was reading his name on a scorecard upside down and misread "Griss" as "Gus".

As a youth, Grissom attended the local Church of Christ, where he remained a lifelong member. He joined the local Boy Scout Troop and earned the rank of Star Scout. Grissom credited the Scouts for his love of hunting and fishing. He was the leader of the honor guard in his troop. His first jobs were delivering newspapers for The Indianapolis Star in the morning and the Bedford Times in the evening. In the summer he picked fruit in area orchards and worked at a dry-goods store. He also worked at a local meat market, a service station, and a clothing store in Mitchell.

Grissom started attending Mitchell High School in 1940. He wanted to play varsity basketball but he was too short. His father encouraged him to find sports he was more suited for, and he joined the swimming team. Although he excelled at mathematics, Grissom was an average high school student in other subjects. He graduated from high school in 1944.

In addition, Grissom occasionally spent time at a local airport in Bedford, Indiana, where he first became interested in aviation. A local attorney who owned a small plane would take him on flights and taught him the basics of flying.

== World War II ==
World War II began while Grissom was still in high school, but he was eager to join the armed services upon graduation. Grissom enlisted as an aviation cadet in the U.S. Army Air Forces during his senior year in high school, and completed an entrance exam in November 1943. Grissom was inducted into the U.S. Army Air Forces on August 8, 1944, at Fort Benjamin Harrison, Indiana. He was sent to Sheppard Field in Wichita Falls, Texas, for five weeks of basic flight training, and was later stationed at Brooks Field in San Antonio, Texas. In January 1945 Grissom was assigned to Boca Raton Army Airfield in Florida. Although he was interested in becoming a pilot, most of Grissom's time before his discharge in 1945 was spent as a clerk.

== Post-war employment ==
Grissom was discharged from military service in November 1945, after the war had ended, and returned to Mitchell, where he took a job at Carpenter Body Works, a local bus manufacturing business. Grissom was determined to make his career in aviation and attend college. Using the G.I. Bill for partial payment of his school tuition, Grissom enrolled at Purdue University in September 1946.

Due to a shortage of campus housing during her husband's first semester in college in West Lafayette, Indiana, Grissom's wife, Betty, stayed in Mitchell living with her parents, while Grissom lived in a rented apartment with another male student. Betty Grissom joined her husband on campus during his second semester, and the couple settled into a small, one-bedroom apartment. Grissom continued his studies at Purdue, worked part-time as a cook at a local restaurant, and took summer classes to finish college early, while his wife worked the night shift as a long-distance operator for the Indiana Bell Telephone Company to help pay for his schooling and their living expenses. Grissom graduated from Purdue with a Bachelor of Science degree in mechanical engineering in February 1950.

== Korean War ==
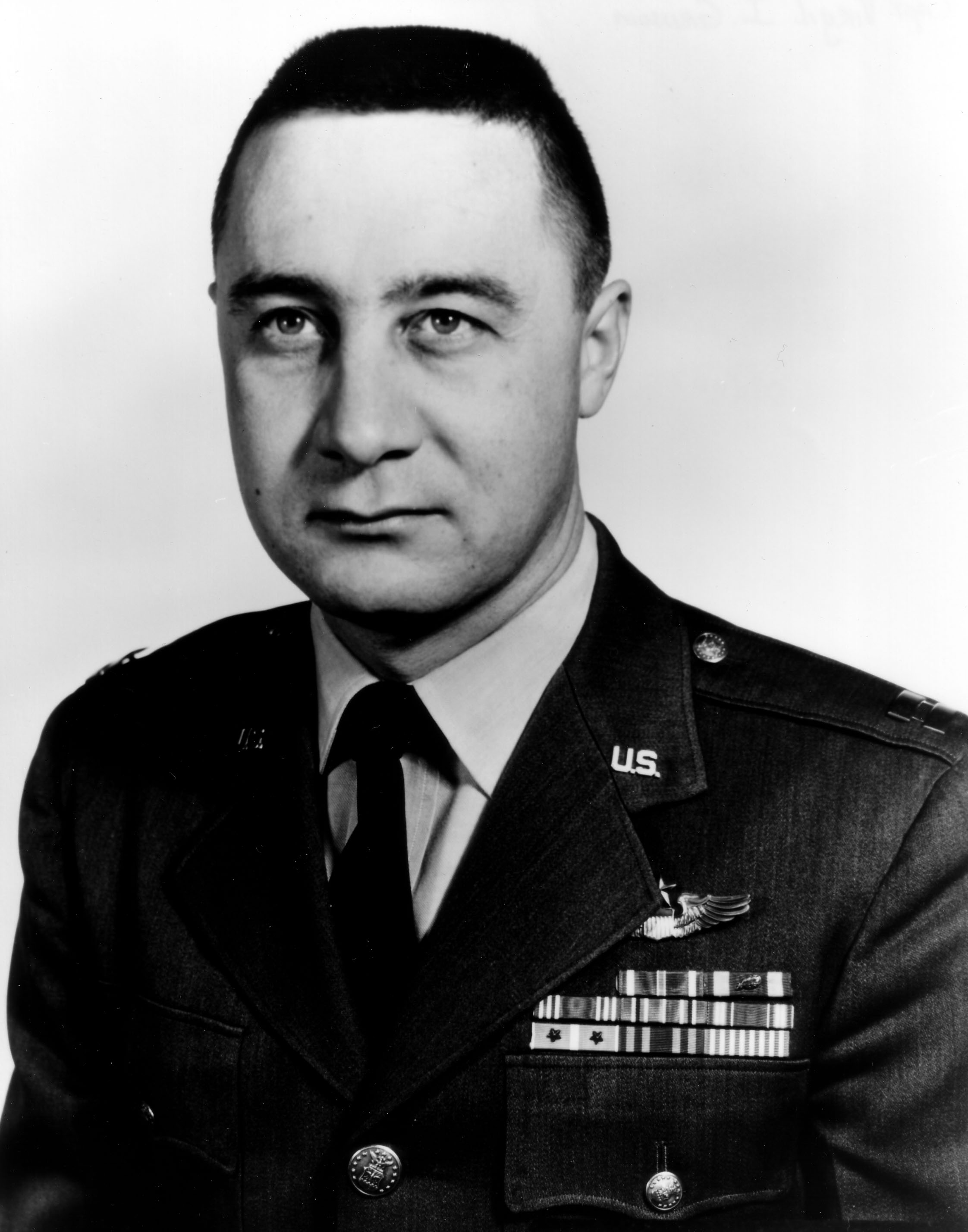
Grissom in the United States Air Force

After he graduated from Purdue, Grissom re-enlisted in the newly formed U.S. Air Force. He was accepted into the Air Cadet Basic Training Program at Randolph Air Force Base in Universal City, Texas. Upon completion of the program, he was assigned to Williams Air Force Base in Mesa, Arizona, where his wife, Betty, and infant son, Scott, joined him, but the family remained there only briefly. In March 1951, Grissom received his pilot wings and a commission as a second lieutenant. Nine months later, in December 1951, Grissom and his family moved into new living quarters in Presque Isle, Maine, where he was assigned to Presque Isle Air Force Base and became a member of the 75th Fighter-Interceptor Squadron.

With the ongoing Korean War, Grissom's squadron was dispatched to the war zone in February 1952. There he flew as an F-86 Sabre replacement pilot and was reassigned to the 334th Fighter Squadron of the 4th Fighter Interceptor Wing stationed at Kimpo Air Base. He flew one hundred combat missions during approximately six months of service in Korea, including multiple occasions when he broke up air raids from North Korean MiGs. On March 11, 1952, Grissom was promoted to first lieutenant and was cited for his "superlative airmanship" for his actions on March 23, 1952, when he flew cover for a photo reconnaissance mission. Grissom was also awarded the Distinguished Flying Cross and the Air Medal with an oak leaf cluster for his military service in Korea.

After flying his quota of one hundred missions, Grissom asked to remain in Korea to fly another twenty-five flights, but his request was denied. Grissom returned to the United States to serve as a flight instructor at Bryan AFB in Bryan, Texas, where he was joined by his wife, Betty, and son, Scott. The Grissoms' second child, Mark, was born there in 1953. Grissom soon learned that flight instructors faced their own set of on-the-job risks. During a training exercise with a cadet, the trainee pilot caused a flap to break off from their two-seat trainer, sending it into a roll. Grissom quickly climbed from the rear seat of the small aircraft to take over the controls and safely land it.

In August 1955, Grissom was reassigned to the U.S. Air Force Institute of Technology (AFIT) at Wright-Patterson Air Force Base near Dayton, Ohio of Air University. After completing the year-long course he earned a bachelor's degree in aeromechanics in 1956. In October 1956, he entered the U.S. Air Force Test Pilot School at Edwards Air Force Base in California, and returned to Wright-Patterson AFB in Ohio in May 1957, after attaining the rank of captain. Grissom served as a test pilot assigned to the fighter branch.

== NASA career ==
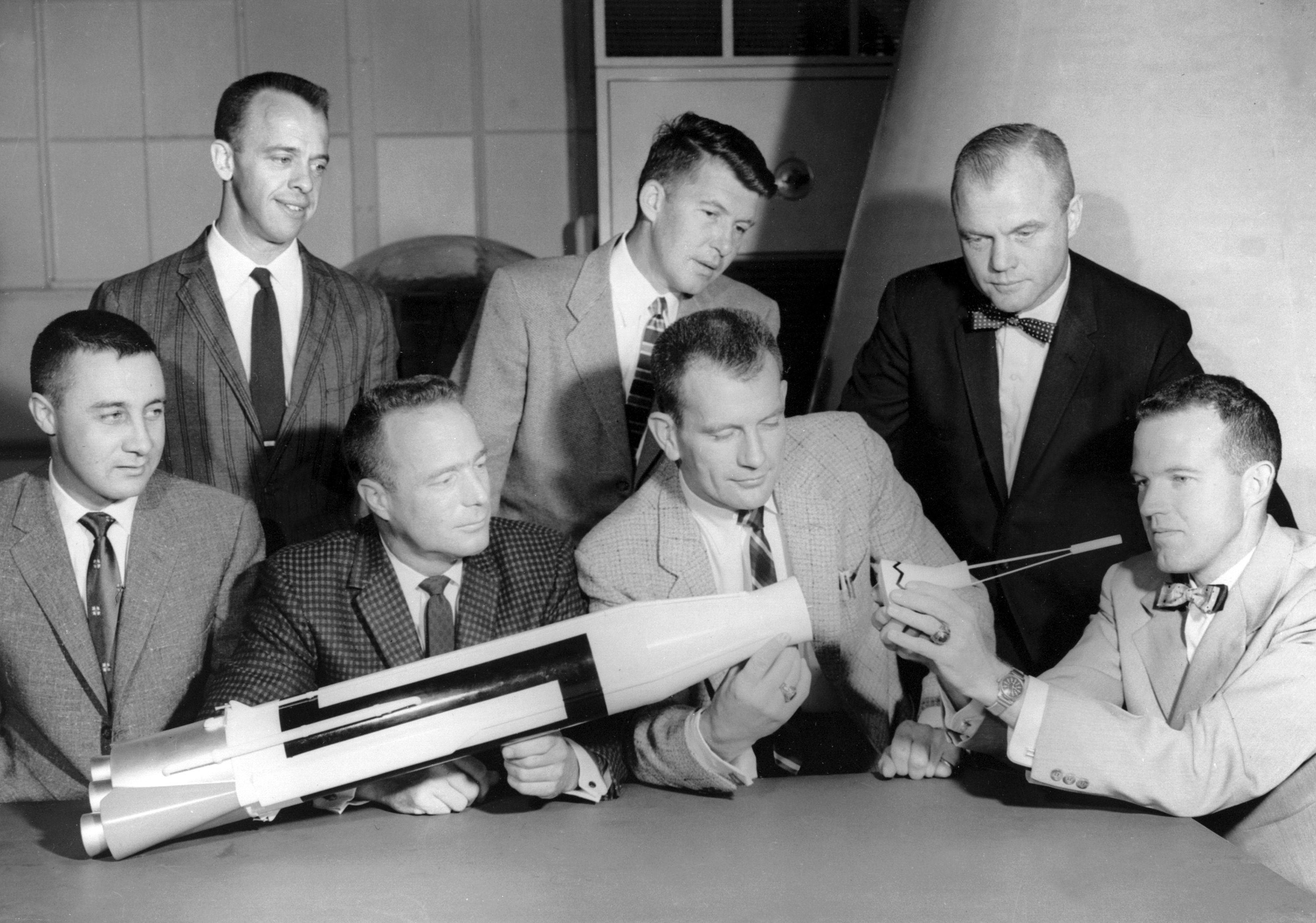
Grissom (far left) with fellow Project Mercury astronauts and a model of the Atlas rocket, July 12, 1962

In 1959, Grissom received an official teletype message instructing him to report to an address in Washington, D.C., wearing civilian clothes. The message was classified "Top Secret" and Grissom was ordered not to discuss its contents with anyone. Of the 508 military candidates who were considered, he was one of 110 test pilots whose credentials had earned them an invitation to learn more about the U.S. space program in general and its Project Mercury. Grissom was intrigued by the program, but knew that competition for the final spots would be fierce.

Grissom passed the initial screening in Washington, D.C., and was among the thirty-nine candidates sent to the Lovelace Clinic in Albuquerque, New Mexico, and the Aeromedical Laboratory of the Wright Air Development Center in Dayton, Ohio, to undergo extensive physical and psychological testing. He was nearly disqualified when doctors discovered that he suffered from hay fever, but was permitted to continue after he argued that his allergies would not be a problem due to the absence of ragweed pollen in space.

On April 13, 1959, Grissom received official notification that he had been selected as one of the seven Project Mercury astronauts. Grissom and the six other men, after taking a leave of absence from their respective branches of the military service, reported to the Space Task Group at Langley Air Force Base in Virginia on April 27, 1959, to begin their astronaut training.

=== Project Mercury ===
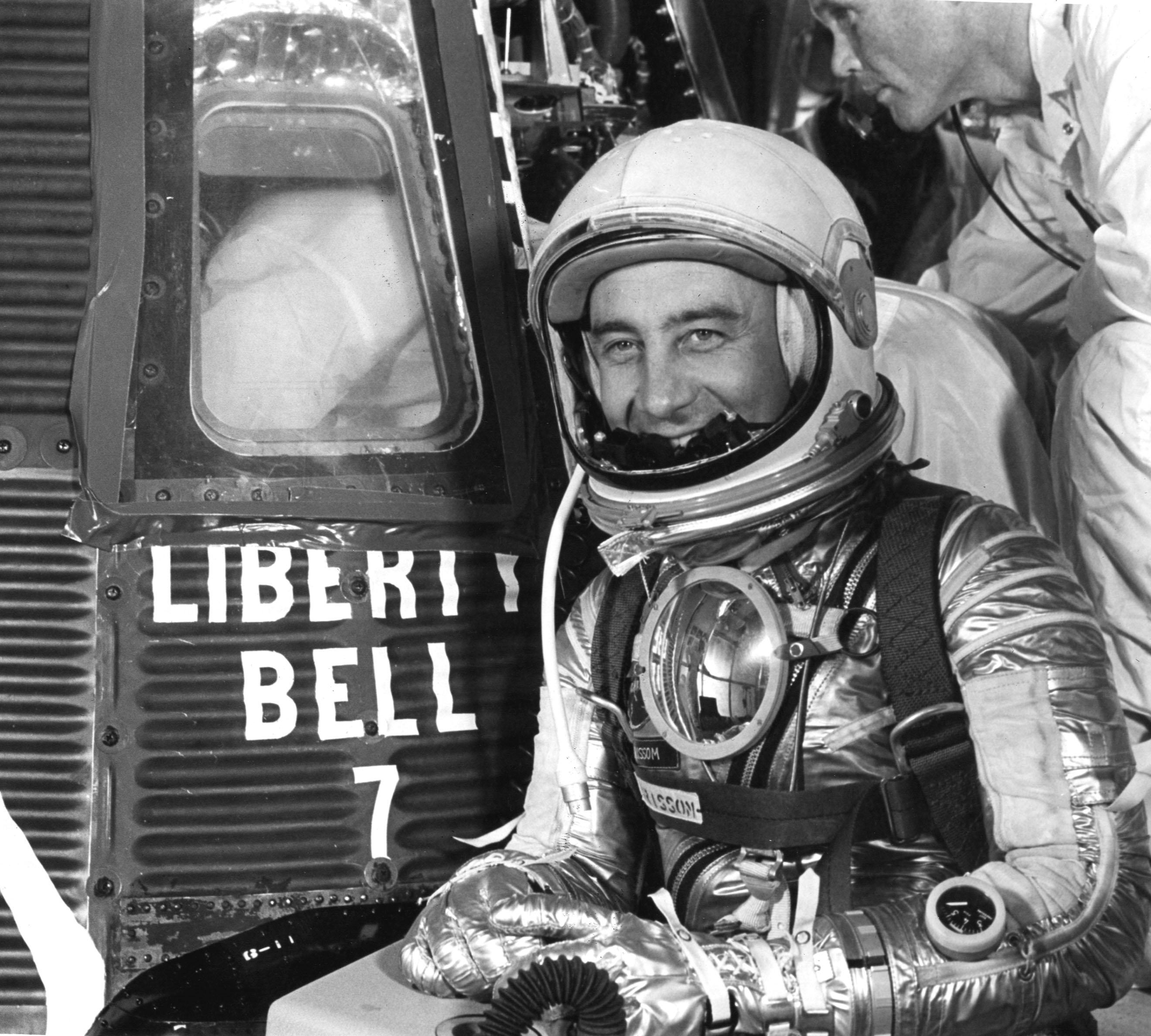
Grissom in front of the Liberty Bell 7 spacecraft

On July 21, 1961, Grissom was pilot of the second Project Mercury flight, Mercury-Redstone 4. Grissom named his spacecraft Liberty Bell 7 after the Liberty Bell, and drew a crack on it as a nod to the bell. Liberty Bell 7 was launched from Cape Canaveral, Florida, a sub-orbital flight that lasted 15 minutes and 37 seconds. After splashdown in the Atlantic Ocean, the Liberty Bell 7's emergency explosive bolts unexpectedly fired, blowing off the hatch and causing water to flood into the spacecraft. Grissom quickly exited through the open hatch and into the ocean. While waiting for recovery helicopters from USS Randolph to pick him up, Grissom struggled to keep from drowning after his spacesuit began losing buoyancy due to an open air inlet. Grissom managed to stay afloat until he was pulled from the water by a helicopter and taken to the U.S. Navy ship. In the meantime another recovery helicopter tried to lift and retrieve the Liberty Bell 7, but the flooding spacecraft became too heavy, forcing the recovery crew to cut it loose, and it ultimately sank.

When reporters at a news conference surrounded Grissom after his space flight to ask how he felt, Grissom replied, "Well, I was scared a good portion of the time; I guess that's a pretty good indication." Grissom stated he had done nothing to cause the hatch to blow, and no definitive explanation for the incident was found. Robert F. Thompson, director of Mercury operations, was dispatched to USS Randolph by Space Task Group Director Robert Gilruth and spoke with Grissom upon his arrival on the aircraft carrier. Grissom explained that he had gotten ahead in the mission timeline and had removed the detonator cap, and also pulled the safety pin. Once the pin was removed, the trigger was no longer held in place and could have inadvertently fired as a result of ocean wave action, bobbing as a result of helicopter rotor wash, or other activity. NASA officials concluded Grissom had not necessarily initiated the firing of the explosive hatch, which would have required pressing a plunger that required five pounds of force to depress. Hitting this metal trigger with the hand typically left a large bruise, but Grissom was found not to have any of the telltale hand bruising.

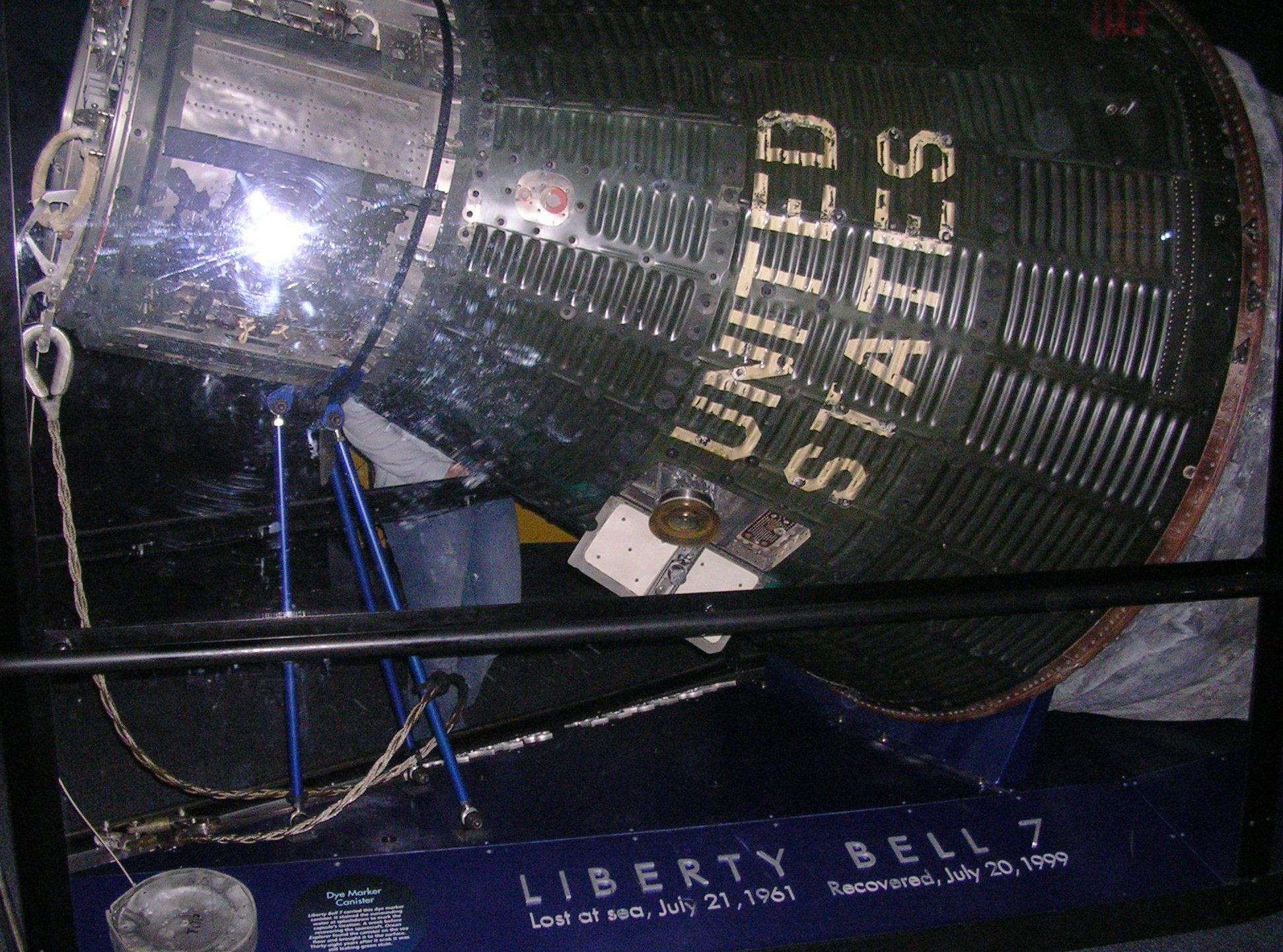
Liberty Bell 7, recovered in 1999, was restored and is displayed at the Cosmosphere in Hutchinson, Kansas

While the debate continued about the premature detonation of Liberty Bell 7's hatch bolts, precautions were initiated for subsequent flights. Fellow Mercury astronaut Wally Schirra, at the end of his October 3, 1962, flight, remained inside his spacecraft until it was safely aboard the recovery ship, and made a point of deliberately blowing the hatch to get out of the spacecraft, bruising his hand.

Grissom's spacecraft was recovered in 1999, but no evidence was found that could conclusively explain how the explosive hatch release had occurred. Later, Guenter Wendt, pad leader for the early American crewed space launches, wrote that he believed a small cover over the external release actuator was accidentally lost sometime during the flight or splashdown. Another possible explanation was that the hatch's T-handle may have been tugged by a stray parachute suspension line, or was perhaps damaged by the heat of re-entry, and after cooling upon splashdown it contracted and caught fire. It has also been suggested that a static electricity discharge during initial contact between the spacecraft and the rescue helicopter may have caused the hatch's explosive bolts to blow. The co-pilot of the helicopter, U.S. Marine Corps Lieutenant John Reinhard, had the job of using a cutting pole to snip off an antenna before the helicopter could latch onto the capsule. In the 1990s, he told a researcher that he remembered seeing an electric arc jump between the capsule and his pole right before the hatch blew. Jim Lewis, the pilot of Grissom's rescue helicopter, told Smithsonian Magazine that closer inspection of film footage made him remember the day in better detail. He recalled that "Reinhard must have cut the antenna a mere second or two before I got us in a position for him to attach our harness to the capsule lifting bale," indicating that the timing of the helicopter's approach aligned with the static discharge theory.

=== Project Gemini ===
In early 1964, Alan Shepard was grounded after being diagnosed with Ménière's disease and Grissom was designated command pilot for Gemini 3, the first crewed Project Gemini flight, which flew on March 23, 1965. This mission made Grissom the first NASA astronaut to fly into space twice. The two-man flight on Gemini 3 with Grissom and John W. Young made three revolutions of the Earth and lasted for 4 hours, 52 minutes and 31 seconds. Grissom was one of the eight pilots of the NASA paraglider research vehicle (Paresev).

Grissom, the shortest of the original seven astronauts at five feet seven inches tall, worked very closely with the engineers and technicians from McDonnell Aircraft who built the Gemini spacecraft. Because of his involvement in the design of the first three spacecraft, his fellow astronauts humorously referred to the craft as "the Gusmobile". By July 1963 NASA discovered 14 out of its 16 astronauts could not fit themselves into the cabin and the later cockpits were modified. During this time Grissom invented the multi-axis translation thruster controller used to push the Gemini and Apollo spacecraft in linear directions for rendezvous and docking.

In a joking nod to the sinking of his Mercury craft, Grissom named the first Gemini spacecraft Molly Brown (after the popular Broadway show, The Unsinkable Molly Brown). Some NASA publicity officials were unhappy with this name and asked Grissom and his pilot, John Young, to come up with a new one. When they offered Titanic as an alternate, NASA executives decided to allow them to use the name of Molly Brown for Gemini 3, but did not use it in official references. Much to the agency's chagrin, CAPCOM Gordon Cooper gave Gemini 3 its sendoff on launch with the remark to Grissom and Young, "You're on your way, Molly Brown!" Ground controllers also used it to refer to the spacecraft throughout its flight.

After the safe return of Gemini 3, NASA announced new spacecraft would not be nicknamed. Hence, Gemini 4 was not called American Eagle as its crew had planned. The practice of nicknaming spacecraft resumed in 1967, when managers realized that the Apollo flights needed a name for each of two flight elements, the Command Module (CSM) and the Lunar Module. Lobbying by the astronauts and senior NASA administrators also had an effect. Apollo 9 used the name Gumdrop for the Command Module and Spider for the Lunar Module. However, Wally Schirra was prevented from naming his Apollo 7 spacecraft Phoenix in honor of the Apollo 1 crew because some believed that its nickname as a metaphor for "fire" might be misunderstood.

=== Apollo program ===
Grissom was backup command pilot for Gemini 6A when he was transferred to the Apollo program and was assigned as commander of the first crewed mission, AS-204, with Senior Pilot Ed White, who had flown in space on the Gemini 4 mission, when he became the first American to make a spacewalk, and Pilot Roger B. Chaffee. The three men were granted permission to refer to their flight as "Apollo 1" on their mission insignia patch.

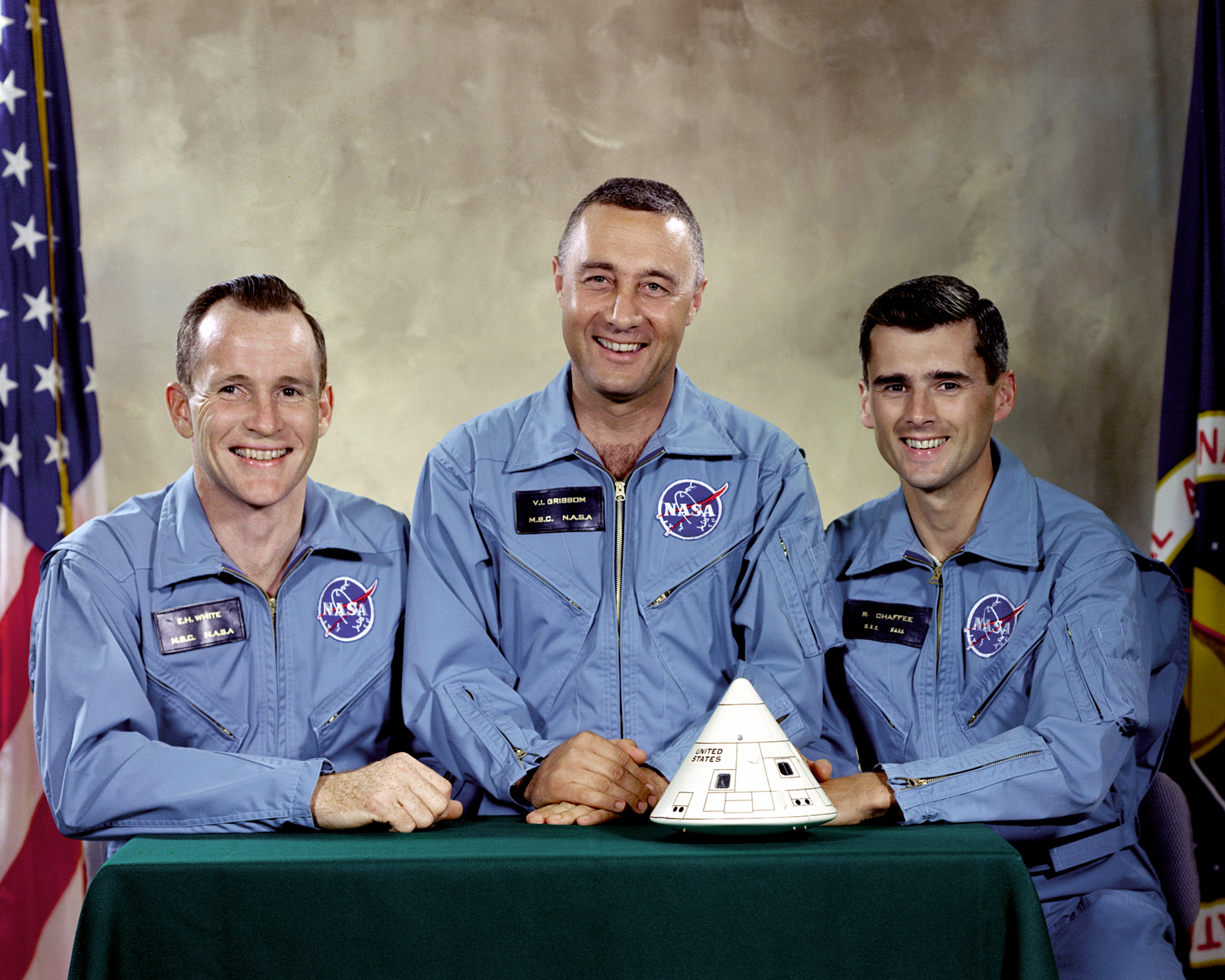
Grissom with the Apollo 1 crew in 1966

Problems with the simulator proved extremely annoying to Grissom, who told a reporter the problems with Apollo 1 came "in bushelfuls" and that he was skeptical of its chances to complete its fourteen-day mission. Grissom earned the nickname "Gruff Gus" by being outspoken about the technical deficiencies of the spacecraft. The engineers who programmed the Apollo training simulator had a difficult time keeping the simulator in sync with the continuous changes being made to the spacecraft. According to backup astronaut Walter Cunningham, "We knew that the spacecraft was, you know, in poor shape relative to what it ought to be. We felt like we could fly it, but let's face it, it just wasn't as good as it should have been for the job of flying the first crewed Apollo mission."

NASA pressed on. In mid-January 1967, "preparations were being made for the final pre-flight tests of Spacecraft 012." On January 22, 1967, before returning to Cape Kennedy to conduct the January 27 plugs-out test that ended his life, Grissom's wife, Betty, later recalled that he took a lemon from a tree in his back yard and explained that he intended to hang it on that spacecraft, although he actually hung the lemon on the simulator (a duplicate of the Apollo spacecraft).

== Personal life ==
Grissom met Betty Lavonne Moore (1927–2018), in high school. They were married on July 6, 1945, at First Baptist Church in Mitchell when he was home on leave during World War II. The couple had two sons, Scott (1950), and Mark (1953).

Two of Grissom's pastimes were hunting and fishing. The family also enjoyed water sports and skiing.

== Death ==
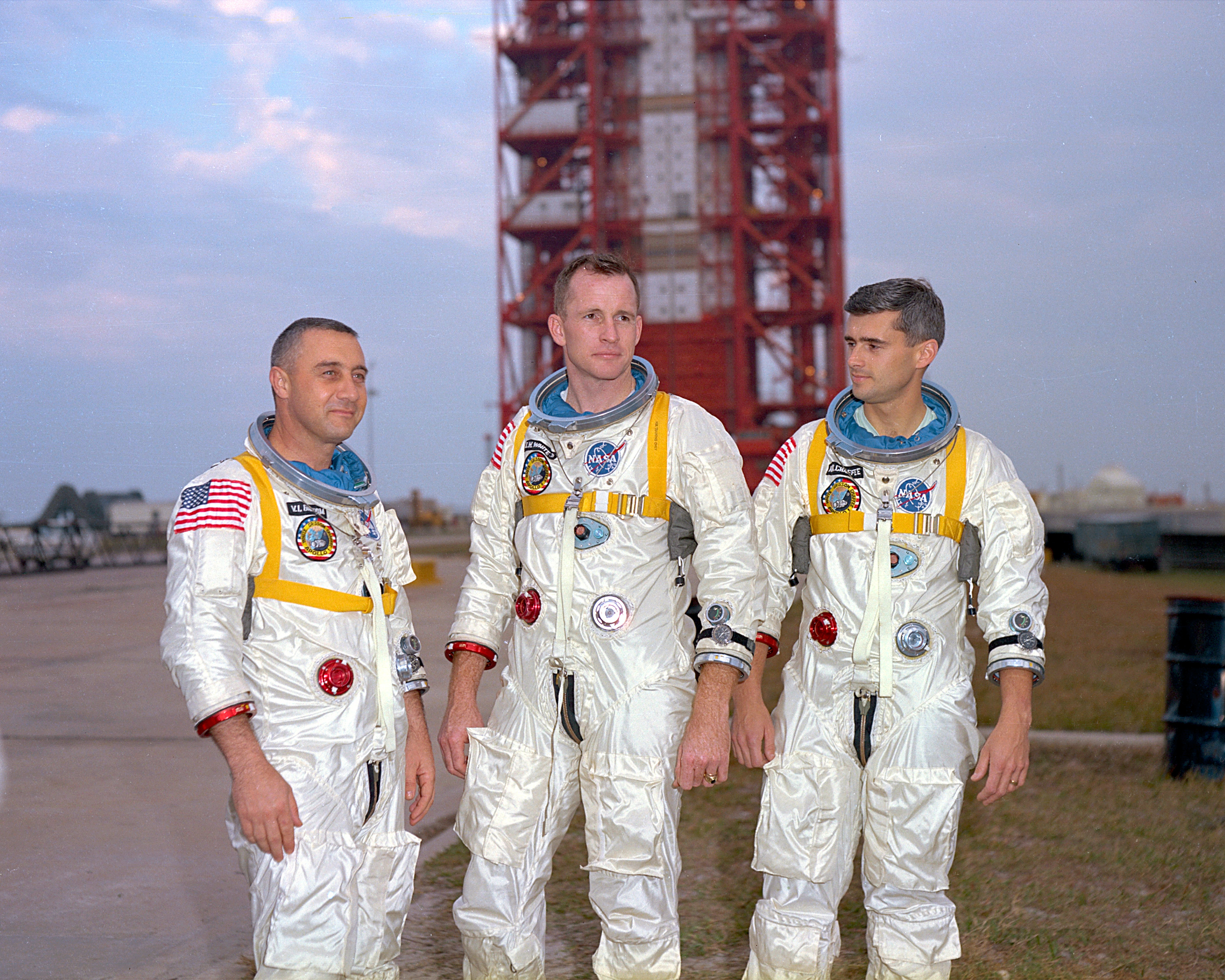
Apollo 1 crew, Grissom, White, and Chaffee

Before Apollo 1's planned launch on February 21, 1967, the Command Module interior caught fire and burned on January 27, 1967, during a pre-launch test on Launch Pad 34 at Cape Kennedy. Astronauts Grissom, White, and Chaffee, who were working inside the closed Command Module, were asphyxiated and died. During the test, Grissom said, "How are we going to get to the Moon if we can't talk between two or three buildings?", then shouted: "fire!".

The fire's ignition source was damaged wiring. The pilots' deaths were attributed to lethal hazards in the early CSM design and conditions of the test, including a pressurized 100 percent oxygen prelaunch atmosphere, wiring and plumbing flaws, flammable materials used in the cockpit and in the astronauts' flight suits, and an inward-opening hatch that could not be opened quickly in an emergency and not at all with full internal pressure.

Grissom's funeral services and burial at Arlington National Cemetery were held on January 31, 1967. Dignitaries in attendance included President Lyndon B. Johnson, members of the U.S. Congress, and fellow NASA astronauts, among others. Grissom was interred at Arlington National Cemetery, in Arlington County, Virginia, beside Roger Chaffee. White's remains are interred at the U.S. Military Academy at West Point, New York.

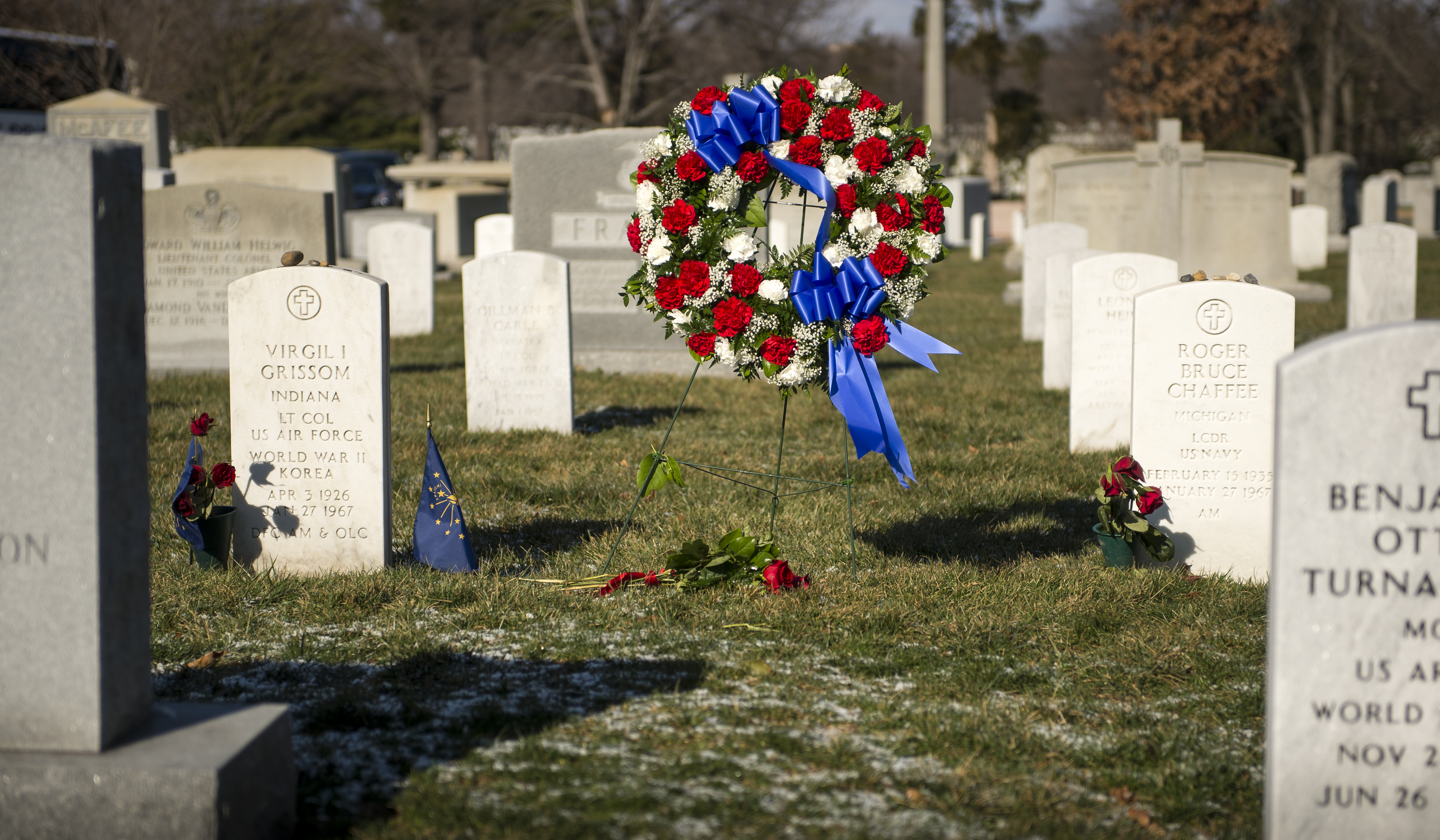
Grissom's and Roger Chaffee's headstones during the NASA Day of Remembrance ceremony in 2013

== Legacy ==
After the accident, NASA decided to give the flight the official designation of Apollo 1 and skip to Apollo 4 for the first uncrewed flight of the Saturn V, counting the two uncrewed suborbital tests, AS-201 and 202, as part of the sequence. The Apollo spacecraft problems were corrected, with Apollo 7, commanded by Wally Schirra, launched on October 11, 1968, more than a year and a half after the Apollo 1 accident. The Apollo program reached its objective of successfully landing men on the Moon on July 20, 1969, with Apollo 11.

At the time of his death, Grissom had attained the rank of lieutenant colonel and had logged a total of 4,600 hours flying time, including 3,500 hours in jet airplanes. Some contend that Grissom could have been selected as one of the astronauts to walk on the Moon. Deke Slayton wrote that he had hoped for one of the original Mercury astronauts to go to the Moon, noting: "It wasn't just a cut-and-dried decision as to who should make the first steps on the Moon. If I had to select on that basis, my first choice would have been Gus, which both Chris Kraft and Bob Gilruth seconded." Ultimately, Alan Shepard, one of the original seven NASA astronauts, would receive the honor of commanding the Apollo 14 lunar landing.

== Liberty Bell 7 spacesuit controversy ==
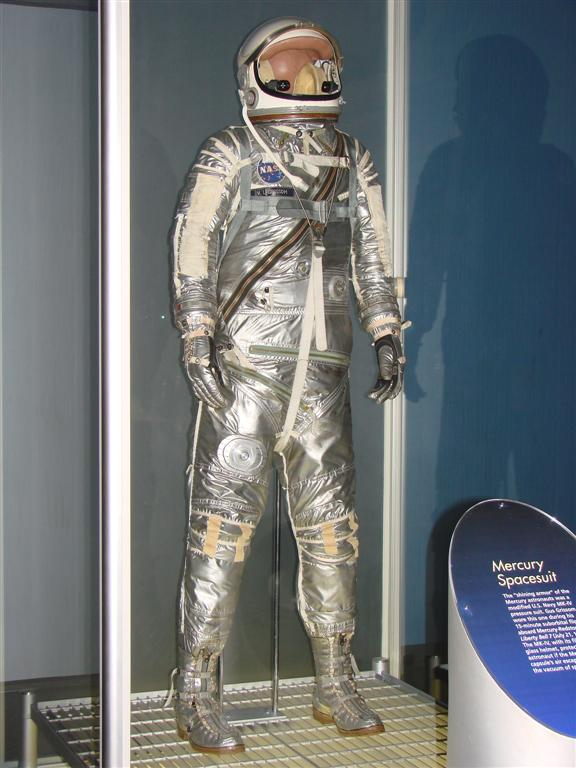
Grissom's Project Mercury spacesuit on display at the U.S. Astronaut Hall of Fame

When the U.S. Astronaut Hall of Fame opened in 1990, his family lent it the spacesuit worn by Grissom during Mercury 4 along with other personal artifacts belonging to the astronaut. In 2002, the museum went into bankruptcy and was taken over by a NASA contractor, whereupon the family sought the exhibit's return. All the artifacts were returned to them except the spacesuit, which NASA claimed was government property. NASA insisted Grissom got authorization to use the spacesuit for a show and tell at his son's school in 1965 and never returned it, but some of Grissom's family members claimed the astronaut rescued the spacesuit from a scrap heap. As of December 2016, the space suit was part of the Kennedy Space Center Hall of Fame's Heroes and Legends exhibit.

== Awards and honors ==
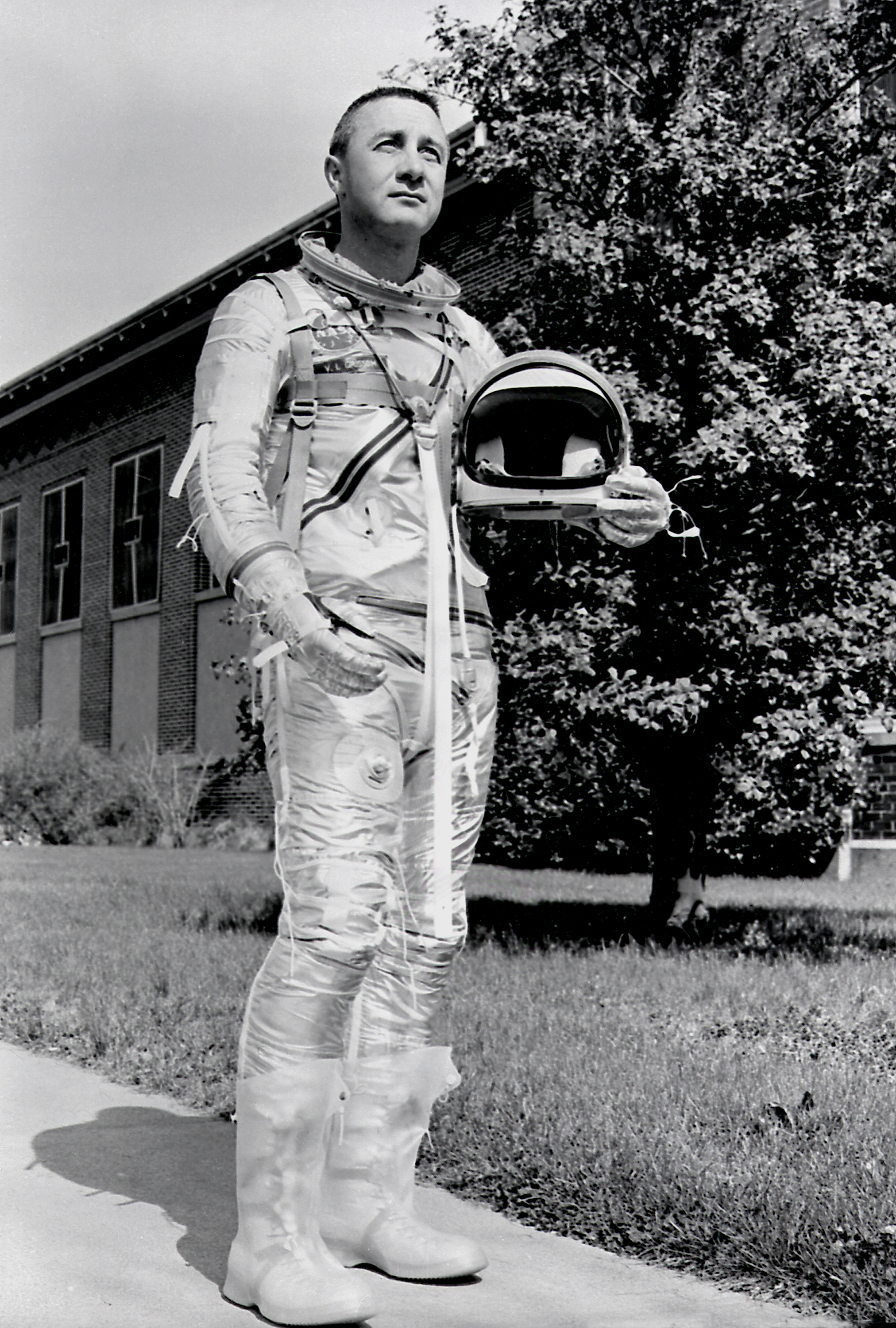
Grissom in his Mercury spacesuit

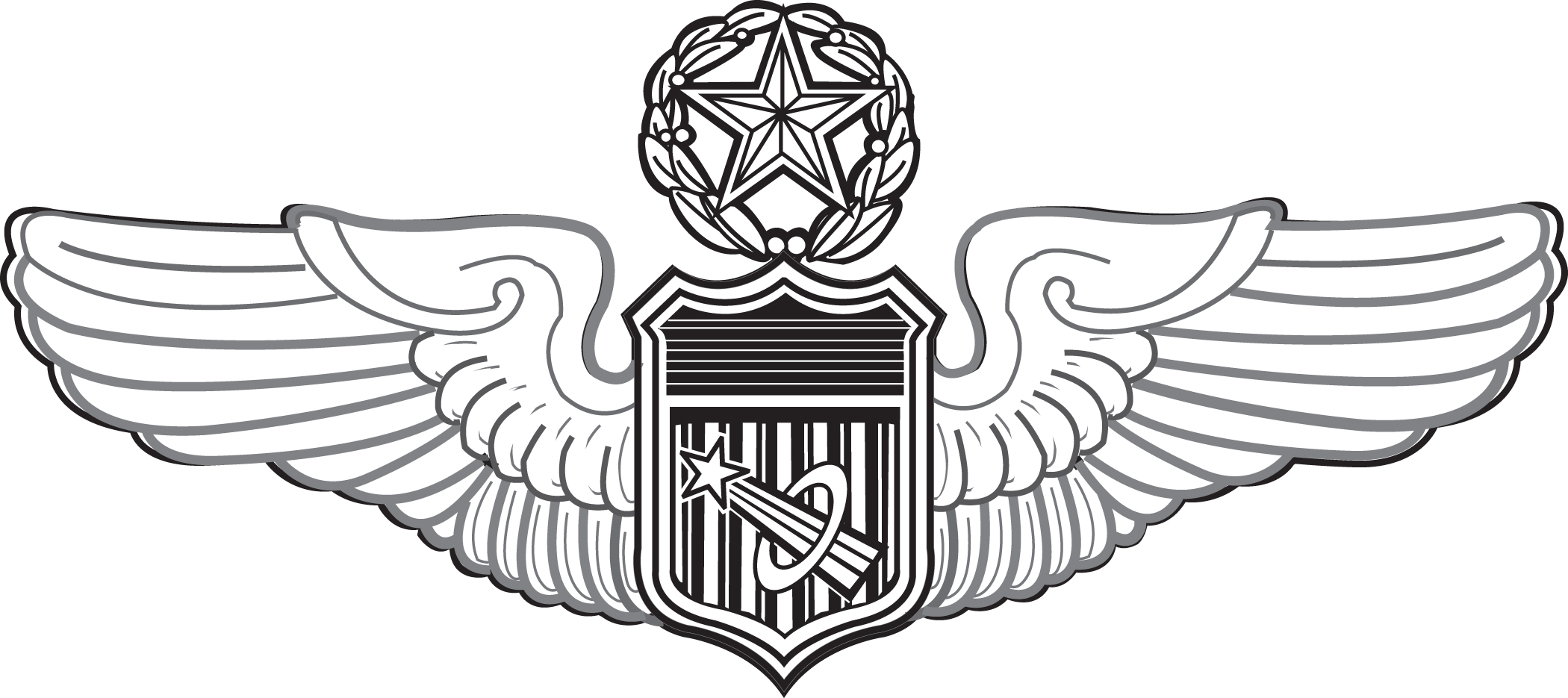

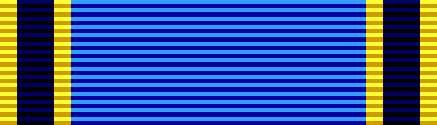

Air Force Command Pilot Astronaut Wings
Distinguished Flying Cross
Air Medal with cluster	Army Good Conduct Medal	Congressional Space Medal of Honor
NASA Distinguished Service Medal with one star	NASA Exceptional Service Medal	American Campaign Medal
World War II Victory Medal	National Defense Service Medal with one star	Korean Service Medal with two stars
Air Force Longevity Service Award with three bronze oak leaves	United Nations Korea Medal	Korean War Service Medal

- John J. Montgomery Award

To celebrate his spaceflight in 1961, Grissom was made honorary Mayor of Newport News, Virginia, and a new library was dubbed the Virgil I. Grissom Library in the Denbigh section of Newport News, Virginia.

The airport in Bedford, Indiana, where Grissom flew as a teenager was renamed Virgil I. Grissom Municipal Airport in 1965. A three-ton piece of limestone, inscribed with his name, was unveiled at the airport. His fellow astronauts ribbed him about the name, saying that airports were normally named for dead aviators. Grissom replied, "But this time they've named one for a live one." Virgil Grissom Elementary School in Old Bridge, New Jersey, was named for Grissom the year before his death. His death forced the cancellation of a student project to design a flag to represent Grissom and their school, which would have flown on the mission.

Grissom was awarded the NASA Distinguished Service Medal for his Mercury flight and was awarded it a second time for his role in Gemini 3. The Apollo 1 crew was awarded the medal posthumously in a 1969 presentation of the Presidential Medal of Freedom to the Apollo 11 crew.

Grissom's family received the Congressional Space Medal of Honor in 1978 from President Carter (White's and Chaffee's families received it in 1997).

Grissom was granted an honorary doctorate from Florida Institute of Technology in 1962, the first-ever awarded by the university. Grissom was inducted into the International Space Hall of Fame in 1981, and the National Aviation Hall of Fame in 1987. Grissom was posthumously inducted into the U.S. Astronaut Hall of Fame in 1990. His wife, Betty Lavonne Moore, donated his Congressional Space Medal of Honor to the accompanying museum.

Grissom posthumously received AIAA's Haley Astronautics Award for 1968.

== Memorials ==
If we die, we want people to accept it. We are in a risky business and we hope that if anything happens to us it will not delay the program. The conquest of space is worth the risk of life.

— Grissom, after his Gemini mission, March 1965 (Note: The provenance of this quote is uncertain. See Leopold 2016, pp. 209–214.)

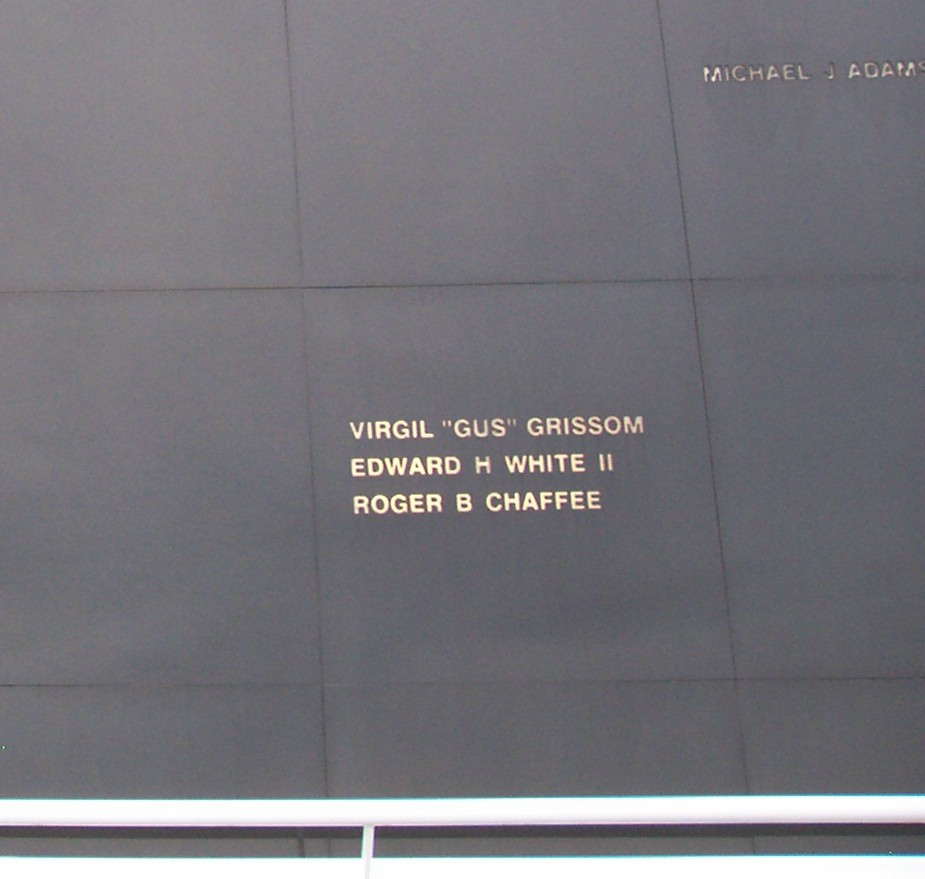
Grissom's name with Roger Chaffee's and Ed White's on the Space Mirror Memorial

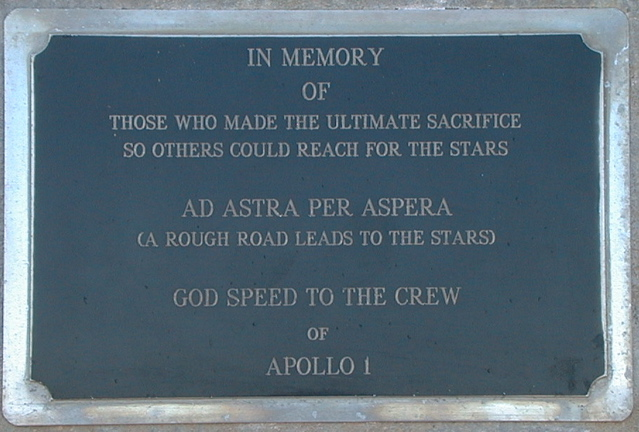
One of two Apollo 1 memorial plaques at Cape Canaveral Air Force Station Launch Complex 34

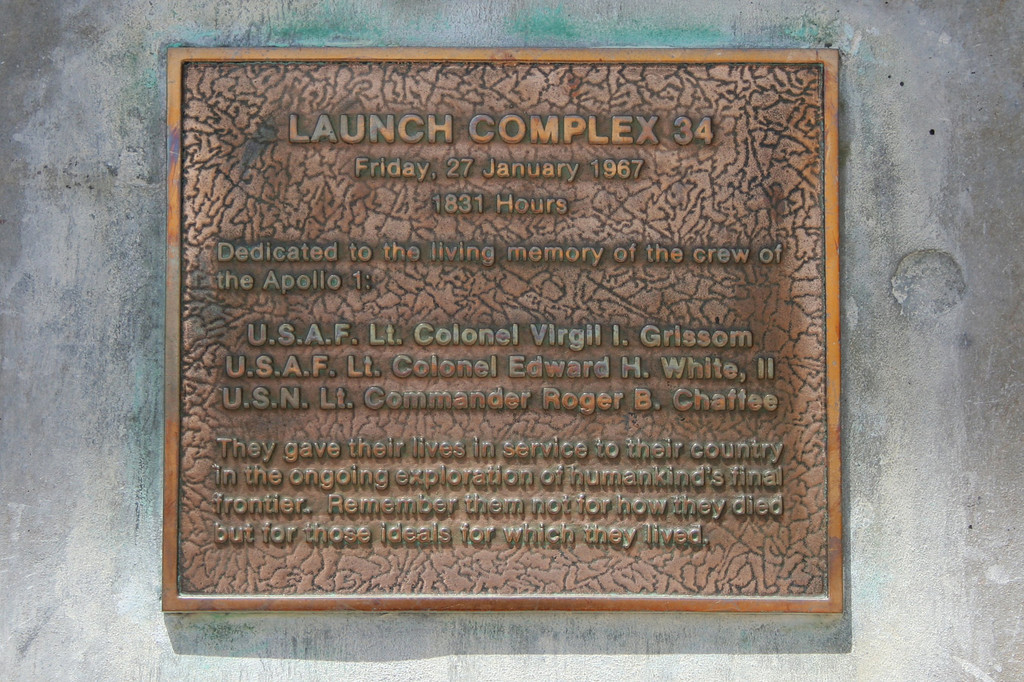
Launch Complex 34 plaque

The dismantled Launch Pad 34 at Cape Canaveral Air Force Station bears two memorial plaques to the crew of Apollo 1. The Kennedy Space Center features a memorial exhibit honoring the Apollo 1 crew in the Apollo/Saturn V Center, which includes artifacts and personal mementos of Grissom, Chaffee, and White. Grissom's name is included on the plaque left on the Moon with the Fallen Astronaut statue in 1971 by the crew of Apollo 15.

The Grissom Memorial, a 44-foot (13 m) tall limestone monument representing the Redstone rocket and his Mercury space capsule was dedicated in downtown Mitchell, Indiana, in 1981. The Virgil I. Grissom Memorial in Spring Mill State Park, near Grissom's hometown of Mitchell, Indiana, was dedicated in 1971, the tenth anniversary of his Mercury flight. The governor declared it a state holiday for the second year in a row. The Gus Grissom Stakes is a thoroughbred horse race run in Indiana each fall; originally held at Hoosier Park in Anderson, it was moved to Horseshoe Indianapolis in Shelbyville in 2014.

Grissom Island is an artificial island off of Long Beach, California, created in 1966 for drilling oil (along with White, Chaffee and Freeman Islands). Virgil "Gus" Grissom Park opened in 1971 in Fullerton, California. His widow and son were invited to the dedication ceremony and planted the first large tree in the park. Grissom is named with his Apollo 1 crewmates on the Space Mirror Memorial, which was dedicated in 1991. His son, Gary Grissom, said, "When I was younger, I thought NASA would do something. It's a shame it has taken this long".

Navi (Ivan spelled backwards), is a seldom-used nickname for the star Gamma Cassiopeiae. Grissom used this name, plus two others for White and Chaffee, on his Apollo 1 mission planning star charts as a joke, and the succeeding Apollo astronauts kept using the names as a memorial. Grissom crater is one of several located on the far side of the Moon named for Apollo astronauts. The name was created and used unofficially by the Apollo 8 astronauts and was adopted as the official name by the International Astronomical Union (IAU) in 1970. 2161 Grissom is a main belt asteroid that was discovered in 1963 and officially designated in 1981. The name references his launch date of July 21, 1961. Grissom Hill, one of the Apollo 1 Hills on Mars was named by NASA on January 27, 2004, the 37th anniversary of the Apollo 1 fire.

Bunker Hill Air Force Base in Peru, Indiana, was renamed on May 12, 1968, to Grissom Air Force Base. During the dedication ceremony, his son said, "Of all the honors he won, none would please him more than this one today." In 1994, it was again renamed to Grissom Air Reserve Base following the USAF's realignment program. The three-letter identifier of the VHF Omni Directional Radio Range (VOR) located at Grissom Air Reserve Base is GUS. In 2000, classes of the United States Air Force Academy began selecting a Class Exemplar who embodies the type of person they strive to be. The class of 2007 selected Grissom. An academic building was renamed Grissom Hall in 1968 at the former Chanute Air Force Base, Rantoul, Illinois, where Minuteman missile maintenance training was conducted. It was one of five buildings renamed for deceased Air Force personnel.

The Virgil I. Grissom Museum, dedicated in 1971 by Governor Edgar Whitcomb, is located just inside the entrance to Spring Mill State Park in Mitchell, Indiana. The Molly Brown was transferred to be displayed in the museum in 1974. His boyhood home in Mitchell, Indiana, is located on Grissom Avenue. The street was renamed in his honor after his Mercury flight.

=== Schools ===
Florida Institute of Technology dedicated Grissom Hall, a residence hall, in 1967. State University of New York at Fredonia dubbed their new residence hall Grissom Hall in 1967. Grissom Hall, dedicated in 1968 at Purdue University, was the home of the School of Aeronautics and Astronautics for several decades. It is currently home of the Purdue department of Industrial Engineering.

Virgil I. Grissom Elementary School was built in Houston, Texas, in 1967. Virgil Grissom Elementary School in Princeton, Iowa was one of four schools in Iowa named after astronauts in late 1967. Grissom's family members attended the 1968 dedication of Virgil I. Grissom Middle School in Mishawaka, Indiana. School No. 7 in Rochester, New York, was named for Grissom in April 1968. Devault Elementary School in Gary, Indiana, was renamed Grissom Elementary School in 1969 after Devault was convicted of conspiring to forge purchase orders. Virgil I. Grissom Middle School was dedicated in November 1969 in Sterling Heights, Michigan. Virgil I. Grissom High School was built in 1969 in Huntsville, Alabama. The school board in the Hegewisch community of Chicago, Illinois, voted to name their new school under construction Virgil I. Grissom Elementary School in March 1969. Grissom Elementary School in Tulsa, Oklahoma, was founded in 1969 and dedicated by Betty Grissom in 1970. Grissom Memorial Elementary School was dedicated in 1973 in Muncie, Indiana. Virgil I. Grissom Middle School was founded in Tinley Park, Illinois, in 1975.

Virgil I. "Gus" Grissom Elementary School was operated by the Department of Defense Dependents Schools at the former Clark Air Base, Philippines. Originally named the Wurtsmith Hill School, it was renamed on November 14, 1968. It housed 3rd and 4th grade students. The school was severely damaged by the eruption of Mt. Pinatubo in 1991.

- Virgil I. Grissom Junior High School 226, South Ozone Park, Queens, New York City

== Film and television ==
Grissom has been noted and remembered in many film and television productions. Before he became widely known as an astronaut, the film Air Cadet (1951) starring Richard Long and Rock Hudson briefly featured Grissom early in the movie as a U.S. Air Force candidate for flight school at Randolph Field, San Antonio, Texas. Grissom was depicted by Fred Ward in the film The Right Stuff (1983) and (very briefly) in the film Apollo 13 (1995) by Steve Bernie. He was portrayed in the 1998 HBO miniseries From the Earth to the Moon (1998) by Mark Rolston. Actor Kevin McCorkle played Grissom in the third-season finale of the NBC television show American Dreams. Bryan Cranston played Grissom as a variety-show guest in the film That Thing You Do!. Actor Joel Johnstone portrays Gus Grissom in the 2015 ABC TV series The Astronaut Wives Club. In 2016 Gus Grissom was included in the narrative of the movie Hidden Figures. In 2018, he was portrayed by Shea Whigham in First Man. In 2020's Disney+ miniseries The Right Stuff, Grissom is portrayed by Michael Trotter.

In the 1984 film Star Trek III: The Search for Spock, the Federation starship USS Grissom is named for Grissom. Another USS Grissom was featured in a 1990 episode of the TV series Star Trek: The Next Generation, and was mentioned in a 1999 episode of Star Trek: Deep Space Nine. The character Gil Grissom in the CBS television series CSI: Crime Scene Investigation and the character Virgil Tracy in the British television series Thunderbirds are also named after the astronaut. NASA footage, including Grissom's Mercury, Gemini, and Apollo missions, was released in high definition on the Discovery Channel in June 2008 in the television series When We Left Earth: The NASA Missions.

When Grissom died, he was in the process of writing a book about Gemini.
