= Astronaut Wives Club =

Wives of US Mercury 7 astronauts

The Astronaut Wives Club was an informal support group of women, sometimes called Astrowives, whose husbands were members of the Mercury 7 group of astronauts. The group included Annie Glenn, Betty Grissom, Louise Shepard, Trudy Cooper, Marge Slayton, Rene Carpenter, and Jo Schirra.

== Background ==
Throughout the middle of the twentieth century, the Cold War tensions between the United States of America and the Soviet Union heightened. In an effort to boost American citizens' confidence in their government, U.S. President Dwight Eisenhower decided to become involved in the Space Race and in the late 1950s launched Project Mercury. Seven young men were chosen for this space mission. The astronauts were presented to the public as wholesome all-American heroes and their wives as icons of domestic patriotism. While their husbands were working at Cape Canaveral, Florida, the women were living in Houston, many as next-door-neighbors. The wives formed a tight-knit support group called the "Astronaut Wives Club". They took turns hosting "launch parties"— potlucks to provide an atmosphere of support for each other whenever there was a launch.

== Fame ==
The women "rocketed to fame", becoming celebrities overnight, and were influential in shaping American identity. During this time of national anxiety, Americans were encouraged to find security in values of family, patriotism, and consumerism as embodied in the astronauts' wives. According to Lily Koppel there was a prevalent understanding that women needed to pursue a healthy marriage and family life as a way to support the United States during the Cold War. According to Tom Wolfe, the author of the 1979 book The Right Stuff, NASA marketed the astronaut wives as "seven flawless cameo-faced dolls sitting in the family room with their pageboy bobs in place, ready to offer any and all aid to the brave lads". Life magazine bought exclusive rights to the women's stories, publishing a series of first-person stories by the women in its September 21, 1959, issue.

When the Mercury 7 astronauts were given sporty Corvettes to drive, the wives were strongly encouraged to keep their family-friendly station wagons, which meant that the average American housewives who were following the astronaut wives' example also bought station wagons.

== Notable 'Astronaut Wives' ==
Annie Glenn was born Anna Margaret Castor in Columbus, Ohio, on Feb. 17, 1920, to Homer and Margaret Castor. The family moved to nearby New Concord, Ohio, where John Glenn's family lived, and the two became childhood playmates. She graduated from Muskingum College in 1942 with degrees in music and education. She and Glenn married in 1943 and had two children. She had stuttered badly from childhood and in 1973 received successful treatment and in 1979 gave her first speech. She became an advocate for people with speech disorders and an adjunct professor of speech pathology at Ohio State University. In 1987, the American Speech-Language-Hearing Association created an annual award in her honor. She was widowed in 2016 and died May 19, 2020, aged 100, due to complications from COVID-19.

Louise Shepard was nicknamed "First Lady in Space" when her husband Alan Shepard became the first astronaut into space. She became "the group’s first fashion icon", and clothing stores sold the outfit she wore to the White House to celebrate the launch.

Jo Schirra, born in Seattle to Donald and Josephine Fraser, married naval aviator Wally Schirra in 1946. She died on April 27, 2015.

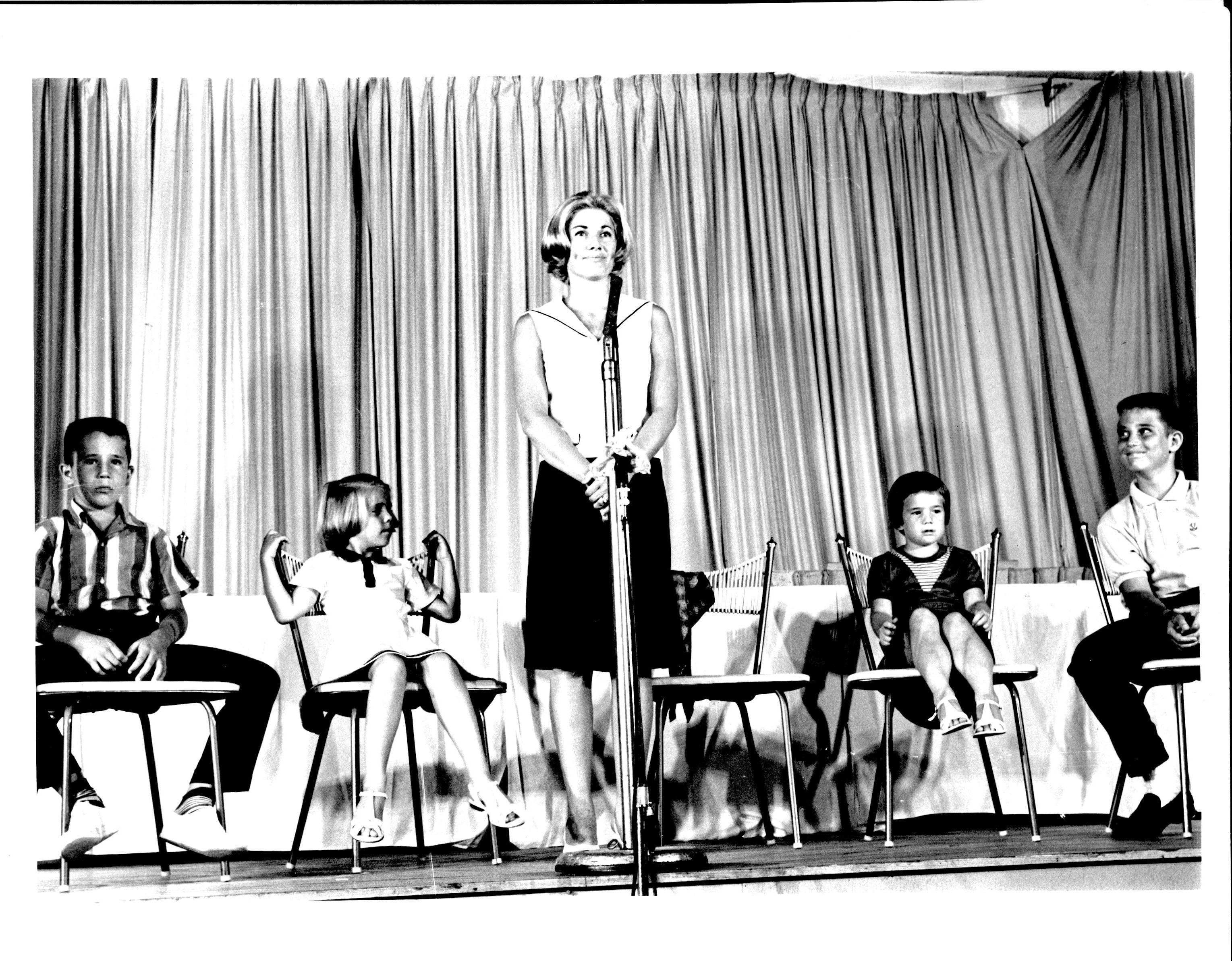
Rene Carpenter and her children at a press conference

Rene Carpenter, born Rene Price, met Scott Carpenter when she was working as an usherette at a theater. They married in Boulder, Colorado, on September 9, 1948. In November 1949 she had their first child, Scott Jr., and thirteen months later their second child, Tim, who died at six months while they were living in San Diego, where her husband was in flight training. The couple had three more children. The Washington Post in 1961 described her as a "striking platinum blonde". Life ran a first-person feature on her experience during the launch of Aurora 7. She and Scott Carpenter divorced, and she moved with their children to Bethesda, Maryland. She had a syndicated newspaper column entitled "A Woman, Still" and from 1972 through 1976 was a TV presenter, first with Everywoman and then with Nine in the Morning. She worked for the Committee for National Health Insurance. She later married Lester Shor, a real estate developer.

The wives of the Next Nine astronauts, chosen in 1962, began meeting in December 1963. The Next Nine or New Nine wives included Pat White, Marilyn See, Marilyn Lovell, Susan Borman, Jane Conrad, Jan Armstrong, Faye Stafford, Barbara Young, and Pat McDivitt.

== In media ==
A 1998 miniseries, From the Earth to the Moon, produced by Tom Hanks, featured an episode written by Sally Field, "The Original Wives Club", about the Next Nine group.

A 2013 New York Times bestseller, The Astronaut Wives Club by Lily Koppel, was written about them. A 2015 television miniseries based on the book was also named The Astronaut Wives Club.

== List of oft-referenced "astronaut wives" ==
Astronaut Group	First spouse	Astronaut	Fate of marriage
Group 1 (Mercury 7)	Rene Price (1948)	Scott Carpenter	Separated 1968; Divorced 1972
Group 1 (Mercury 7)	Trudy Olson (1947)	Gordon Cooper	Divorced 1970
Group 1 (Mercury 7)	Annie Castor (1943)	John Glenn	Married until his death in 2016
Group 1 (Mercury 7)	Betty Moore (1945)	Gus Grissom	Married until his death in the 1967 Apollo 1 accident
Group 1 (Mercury 7)	Josephine Fraser (1946)	Wally Schirra	Married until his death in 2007
Group 1 (Mercury 7)	Louise Brewer (1945)	Alan Shepard	Married until his death in 1998.
Group 1 (Mercury 7)	Marjorie Lunney (1955)	Deke Slayton	Divorced 1978
Group 2 (New Nine)	Jan Shearon (1956)	Neil Armstrong	Divorced 1994
Group 2 (New Nine)	Susan Bugbee (1950)	Frank Borman	Married until her death in 2021
Group 2 (New Nine)	Jane DuBose (1953)	Pete Conrad	Divorced 1988
Group 2 (New Nine)	Marilyn Gerlach (1952)	Jim Lovell	Married until her death in 2023
Group 2 (New Nine)	Patricia Haas (1957)	Jim McDivitt	Divorced 1989
Group 2 (New Nine)	Marilyn Denahy (1954)	Elliot See	Married until his death in the 1966 NASA T-38 crash
Group 2 (New Nine)	Faye Shoemaker (1953)	Tom Stafford	Divorced 1985
Group 2 (New Nine)	Pat Finegan (1953)	Ed White	Married until his death in the 1967 Apollo 1 accident
Group 2 (New Nine)	Barbara White (1956)	John Young	Divorced 1972
Group 3	Joan Archer (1954)	Buzz Aldrin	Divorced 1974
Group 3	Valerie Hoard (1954)	Bill Anders	Married until his death in 2024
Group 3	Jeannie Martin (1955)	Charlie Bassett	Married until his death in the 1966 NASA T-38 crash
Group 3	Sue Ragsdale	Alan Bean	Divorced 1976
Group 3	Barbara Atchley (1961)	Gene Cernan	Divorced 1981
Group 3	Martha Horn (1957)	Roger B. Chaffee	Married until his death in the 1967 Apollo 1 accident
Group 3	Patricia Finnegan (1957)	Michael Collins	Married until her death in 2014
Group 3	Lo Ella Irby	Walter Cunningham	Divorced
Group 3	Harriet Hamilton	Donn F. Eisele	Divorced 1968
Group 3	Faith Clark	Theodore Freeman	Married until his death in 1964
Group 3	Barbara Field	Richard F. Gordon Jr.	Divorced
Group 3	Clare Whitfield	Rusty Schweickart	Divorced
Group 3	Ann Ott (1959)	David Scott	Divorced 2000?
Group 3	Beth Lansche (1964)	Clifton Williams	Married until his death in 1967
