= Annie Glenn =

American advocate (1920–2020)

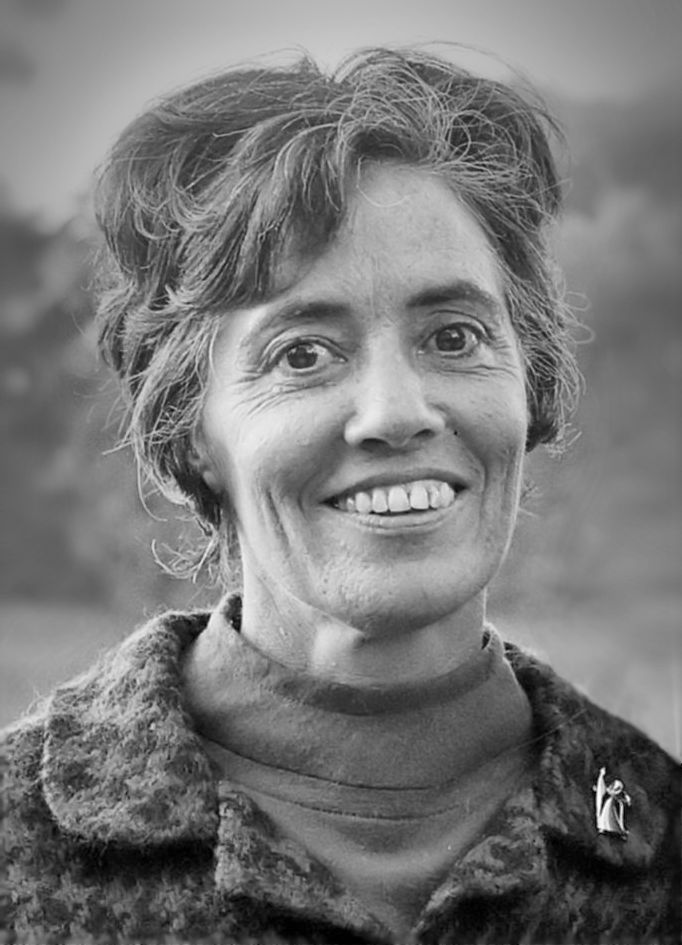
- Glenn in 1965
- Born: Anna Margaret Castor; February 17, 1920; Columbus, Ohio, U.S.
- Died: May 19, 2020 (aged 100); Saint Paul, Minnesota, U.S.
- Resting place: Arlington National Cemetery; Arlington, Virginia
- Education: Muskingum University
- Occupations: Disabilities advocate, philanthropist
- Spouse: John Glenn (m. 1943; died 2016)
- Children: 2

Anna Margaret Glenn (née Castor; February 17, 1920 – May 19, 2020) was an American advocate for people with disabilities and communication disorders and the wife of astronaut and senator John Glenn. A stutterer from an early age, Glenn promoted the awareness of stuttering and other disabilities among children and adults.

== Early life and education ==
Anna Margaret Castor was born on February 17, 1920, in Columbus, Ohio, to Homer and Margaret (Alley) Castor. Her father was a dentist. In 1923, the Castor family moved to New Concord, Ohio.

Castor met John Glenn at a very young age when her parents became involved in the same community organizations as Glenn's parents. The families developed a friendship which allowed Castor and Glenn to remain close as they grew up. The pair became high school sweethearts and continued dating through college. Castor attended Muskingum College where she majored in music with a minor in secretarial skills and physical education. She was an active member of the swim team, volleyball team, and tennis team. She graduated in 1942. Even though she received an offer for a pipe organ scholarship from the Juilliard School, she declined the offer, choosing instead to stay in Ohio with Glenn.

Castor and Glenn were married on April 6, 1943. They had two children, David, born in 1945, and Lyn, born in 1947. During the early years of her marriage, Annie Glenn worked as an organist in various churches and gave trombone lessons.

== Later life ==
=== Influence during the Space Race ===
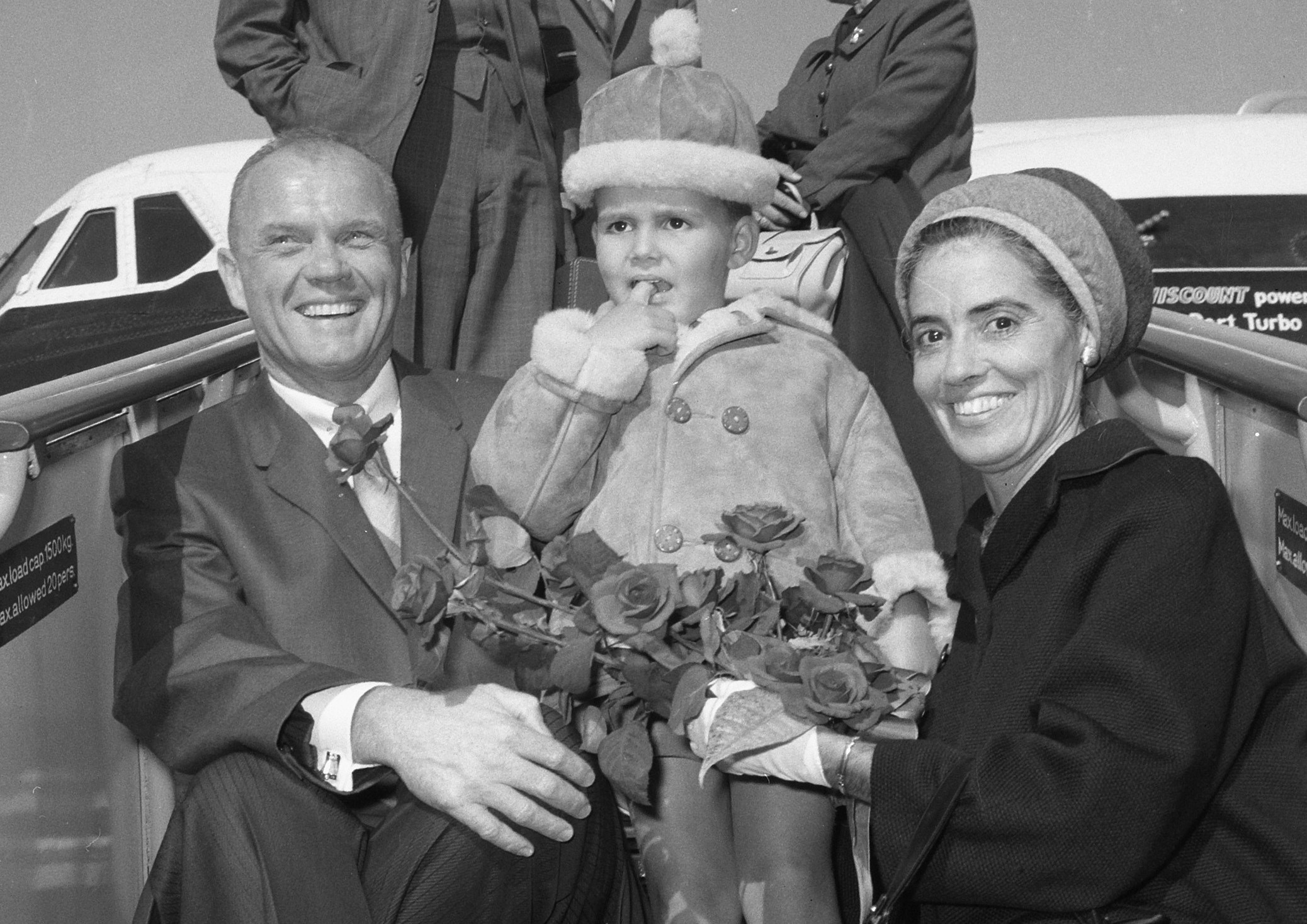
Annie and John Glenn arriving at Schiphol Airport, Amsterdam. 1965

Throughout the middle of the twentieth century, the Cold War tensions between the United States of America and the Soviet Union heightened. In an effort to boost American citizens' confidence in their government, U.S. President Dwight Eisenhower decided to become involved in the Space Race and launch Project Mercury. Seven young men were chosen for this space mission. These all-American astronauts were regarded as wholesome heroes and their wives were the picture of domestic patriotism. Annie Glenn was one of the wives of the Mercury 7 astronauts. These women "rocketed to fame" to become celebrities.

In her book The Astronaut Wives Club (which later became a television miniseries), Lily Koppel relates that Glenn and the other six wives formed a tight-knit support group informally called the "Astronaut Wives Club," which she cites as influential in shaping American identity, as Americans found their values of family, patriotism, and consumerism embodied in Glenn. Koppel states that American women turned to Glenn, who had been elevated in the media because of her all-American family, as a role model on how to maintain a happy home, and also an indirect propagator of the American value of consumption. The appearance of the Astronaut Wives in the media was marketed to average American housewives. For example, when the wives wore a shade of "responsible pink" lipstick to a Life photoshoot, the published photographs were retouched to show the wives wearing "patriotic red" lipstick instead. The lip color was changed to represent a new, vibrant period in American history. After the magazine was published, red lipstick became a fad. Similarly, while Mercury 7 astronauts were given sporty Corvettes to drive, the wives were strongly encouraged to keep their family-friendly station wagons, which meant that the average American housewives who were following the Astronaut Wives' example also bought station wagons. As a result of Glenn and the other members of the Astronaut Wives Club, women across the U.S. were inspired to be brave and of course, to buy the same consumer goods Glenn and the other wives had in their homes.

=== Speech impairment ===
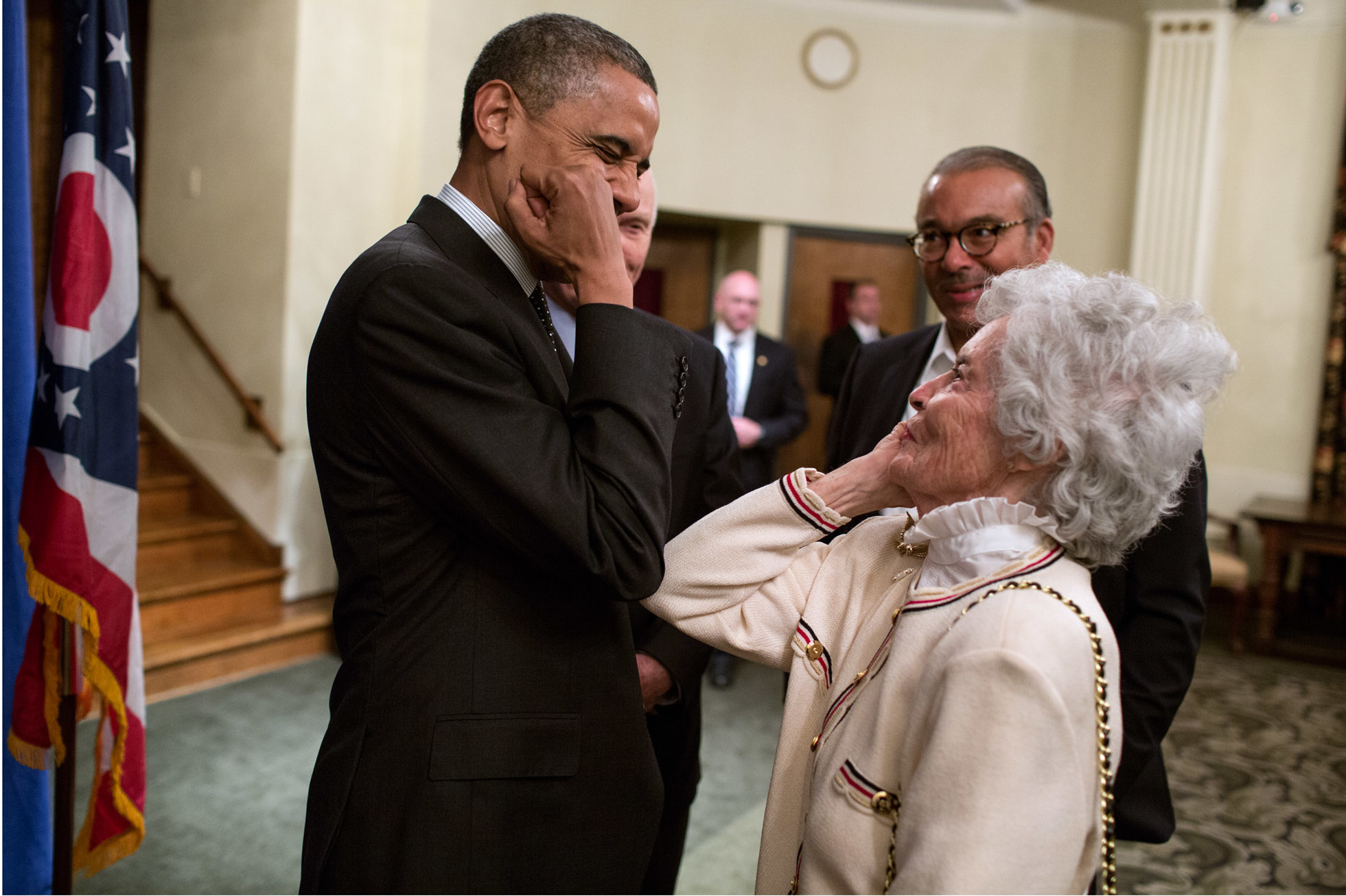
Glenn meeting President Barack Obama in 2012

Like her father, Annie Glenn experienced a speech stutter throughout her life. As a child, Glenn did not feel hindered by her stutter; she happily participated in activities such as softball, girl scouts, school dances, and choir. It was not until sixth grade that she realized her speech impairment. It was determined that her stutter was present in eighty-five percent of her verbal utterances. Despite her difficulty speaking, she was able to create and maintain close relationships. After graduating from college, Glenn wanted to get a job in a different town but because of her disability, her parents were worried about her living independently. However, Glenn found ways to effectively communicate without speaking out loud. For example, before shopping, she would write down exactly what she was looking for and then show the note to the sales clerk when she needed help.

At the age of 53, Glenn discovered and attended a three-week treatment course at Hollins Communications Research Institute in Roanoke, Virginia, to help with her dysfluency. After attending the treatment course, her speech was greatly improved; however, she did not consider herself "cured" of stuttering. Glenn was finally able to confidently vocally interact with others. When her husband began campaigning for the Senate, she was able to support him by giving speeches at public events and at rallies. Glenn used her newfound voice to bring attention to disabled people who she knew had been overlooked so often.

Later, Glenn became an adjunct professor with Ohio State's Speech Pathology Department.

== Awards and honors ==
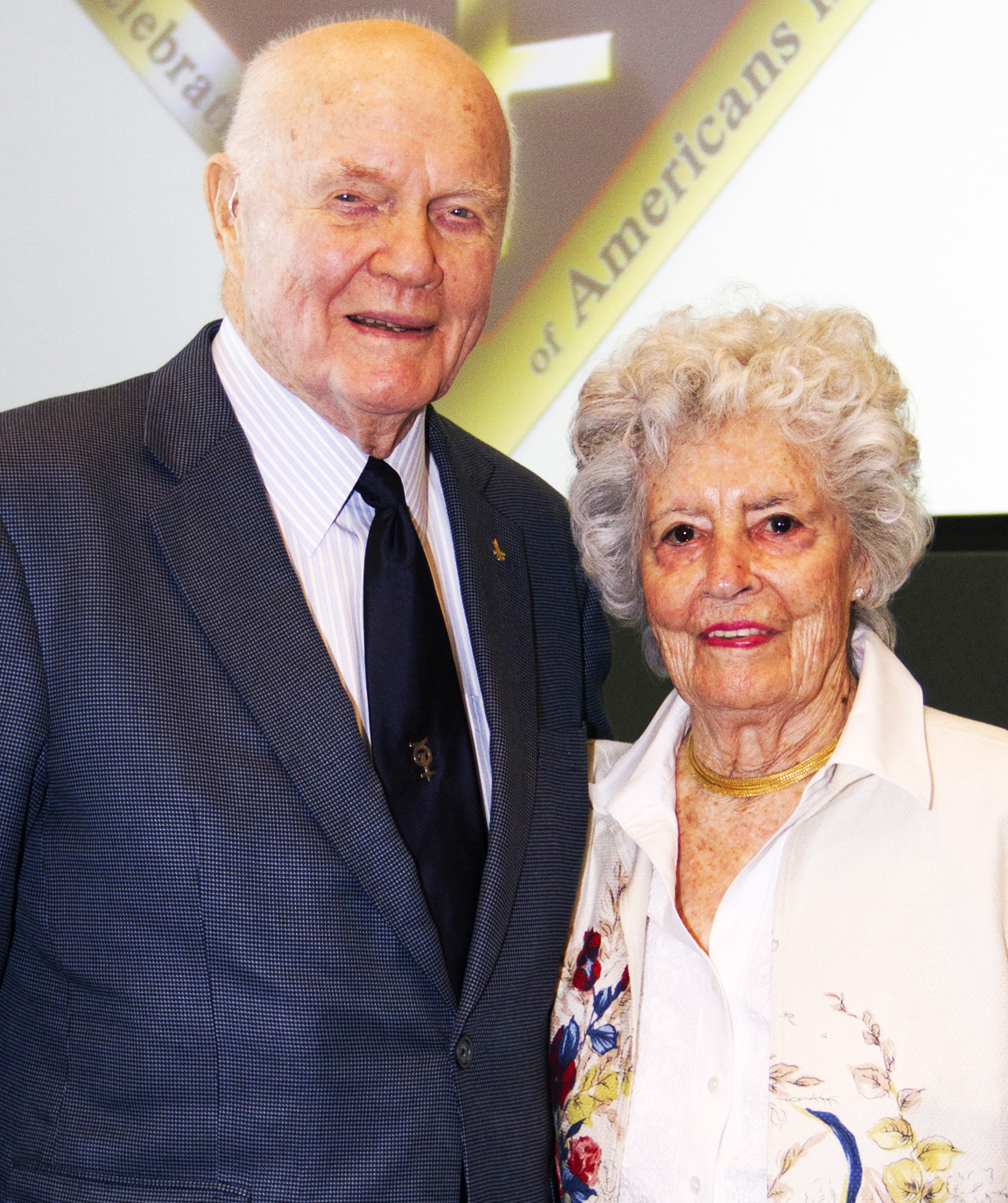
The Glenns in 2012

In 1983, Glenn received the first national award of the American Speech and Hearing Association for her meritorious service to those with communicative disorders. In 1987, the National Association for Hearing and Speech Action awarded the first annual Annie Glenn Award for achieving distinction despite a communication disorder. Glenn presented the award to James Earl Jones as its first recipient. She was inducted into the National Stuttering Association Hall of Fame in 2004. In 2015, Ohio State University renamed 17th Avenue (on its campus) to Annie and John Glenn Avenue.

In 2009, the Ohio State University awarded her an honorary Doctorate of Public Service to recognize her work on behalf of children and others. The department awards the "Annie Glenn Leadership Award" annually to a person that has displayed innovative and inspirational work in speech/language pathology.

=== Activities and involvements ===
Organizations in which she was involved include:

- Delta Gamma Theta Sorority (Muskingum College)
- The Ohio Board of Child Abuse
- The Board of Columbus (Ohio) Speech and Hearing Center
- The Society of Sponsors
- The Board of Trustees of Muskingum College
- The Advisory Panel of the Central Ohio Speech and Hearing Association
- The advisory board for the National Center for Survivors of Childhood Abuse
- The Board for the National First Ladies' Library
- The National Deafness and other Communication Disorders Advisory Council of the National Institutes of Health

== Death ==
Glenn died from complications of COVID-19 on May 19, 2020 at a nursing home in Saint Paul, Minnesota. She was 100 years old.

== Portrayals in popular culture ==
Glenn was played by Mary Jo Deschanel in the 1983 film The Right Stuff. The film highlighted her stutter, particularly in a scene involving U.S. Vice President Lyndon B. Johnson. In a 2015 interview, she and John Glenn indicated that, although they liked the Tom Wolfe book, they did not care for the movie adaptation of The Right Stuff.

In the 2015 ABC-TV series The Astronaut Wives Club, she is portrayed by Azure Parsons and in the 2020 Disney+ series The Right Stuff by Nora Zehetner.
