= AWC =

AWC is a three letter acronym that may refer to:

== Educational institutions ==
- Allegheny Wesleyan College, a private liberal arts college in Ohio
- Air War College, a part of Air University, at Maxwell-Gunter Air Force Base, Alabama

== Military and Weapons ==
- PAF Air War College, a senior staff and war college of the Pakistan Air Force
- Air Warfare Centre, a Royal Air Force Unit located at RAF Waddington and several other units around the UK
- Air Weapons Complex, a development and production center for airborne weapons systems in Pakistan
- Wiesel AWC, a kind of German armoured vehicle
- Arctic Warfare Covert, an Accuracy International sniper rifle variant
- AWC TM-Amphibian "S", integrally-suppressed variant of the Ruger MK II Target
- AWC Ultra II, integrally-suppressed variant of the Ruger 10/22

== Organizations ==
- Afghan Women's Council
- American Wood Council, affiliate of the American Forest & Paper Association
- Association for Women in Communications
- Australian Wildlife Conservancy

== Other uses ==
- Mitsubishi AWC, a four-wheel drive system developed by Mitsubishi Motors
- Accept, Waiver and Consent, a FINRA Disciplinary Action
- Astronaut Wives Club
- Atlantic Wind Connection, an undersea transmission backbone for wind farms off the East coast
- Available water capacity, the range of available water that can be stored in soil and be available for growing crops
- Aviation Weather Center, part of the National Centers for Environmental Prediction in the U.S.
- Avanti West Coast, a British train operating company
- Titan Airways' ICAO airline code
- Alumina Limited's ASX/NYSE code
- Arizona Western College, a community college in Yuma, Arizona
