= Betty Grissom =

Wife of astronaut Gus Grissom (1927–2018)

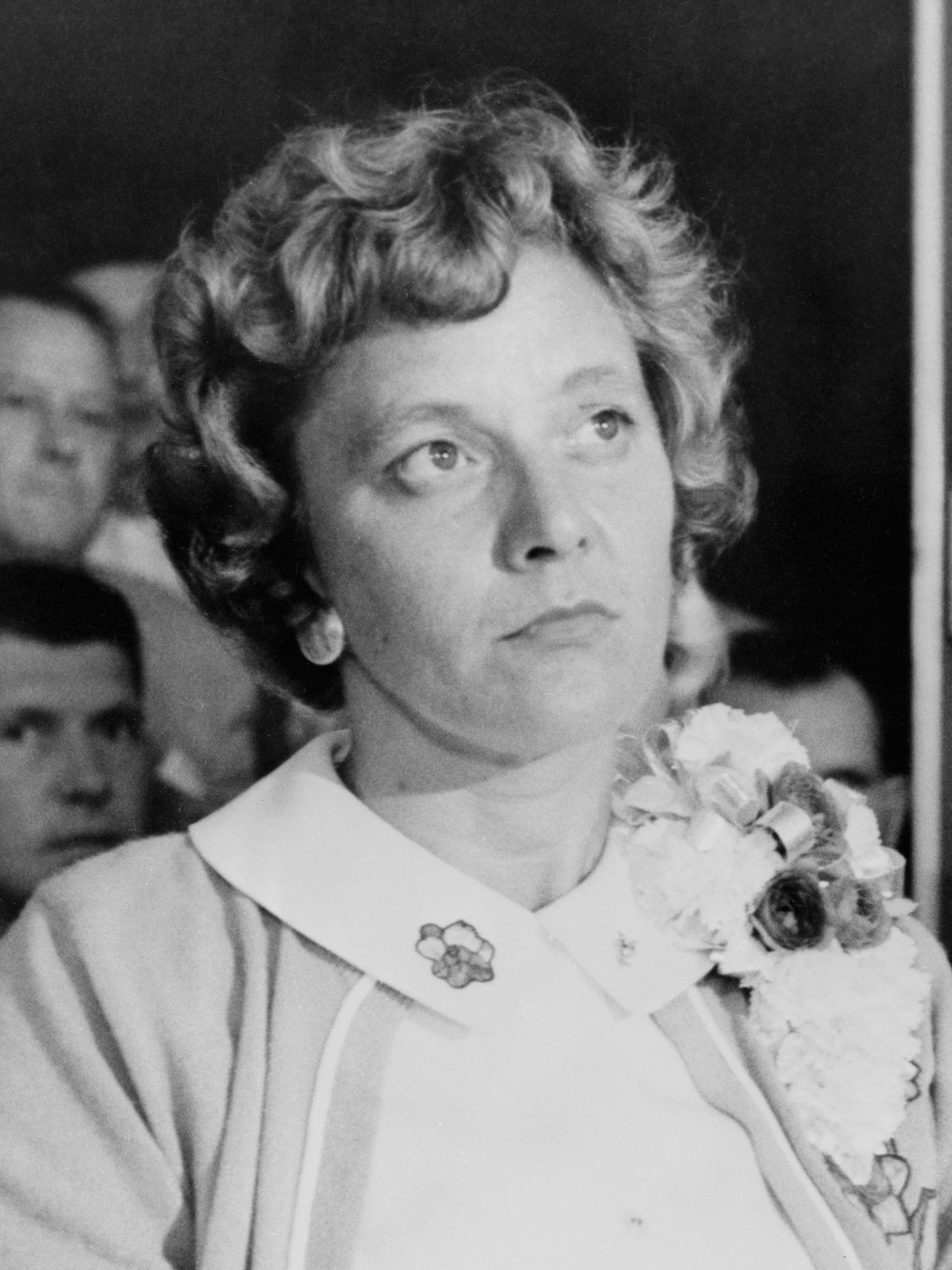
- Grissom in 1961
- Born: Betty Lavonne Moore; August 8, 1927; Mitchell, Indiana, U.S.
- Died: October 7, 2018 (aged 91); Houston, Texas, U.S.
- Burial place: Arlington National Cemetery
- Spouse: Gus Grissom (m. 1945; died 1967)
- Children: 2

Betty Lavonne Grissom (née Moore; August 8, 1927 – October 7, 2018) was the wife of American astronaut Gus Grissom, one of the Mercury Seven astronauts.

After her husband's death, she was the plaintiff in a successful lawsuit against a NASA contractor which established a precedent for families of astronauts killed in service to receive compensation. Her husband died in the first fatal accident in the history of the United States space program. Grissom has been portrayed in the books The Right Stuff (1979) by Tom Wolfe and The Astronaut Wives Club (2013) by Lily Koppel and by the actors Veronica Cartwright and JoAnna Garcia in the film and television adaptations of those books.

== Early life ==
Betty Lavonne Moore was born in 1927 in Mitchell, Indiana to Claude and Pauline (née Sutherlin) Moore. Her father worked at a cement plant. She met Gus Grissom when she was a freshman and he was a sophomore in high school. The two were married in 1945. Grissom worked as a late-night telephone operator for Indiana Bell while her husband studied mechanical engineering at Purdue University. Gus was selected as an astronaut after flying over a hundred combat missions in Korea. He became one of the Mercury Seven and was the second American in space. Betty Grissom formed the Astronaut Wives Club along with the wives of the other Mercury 7 astronauts, to support one another while their husbands prepared for and achieved spaceflight.

== Husband's death and aftermath ==
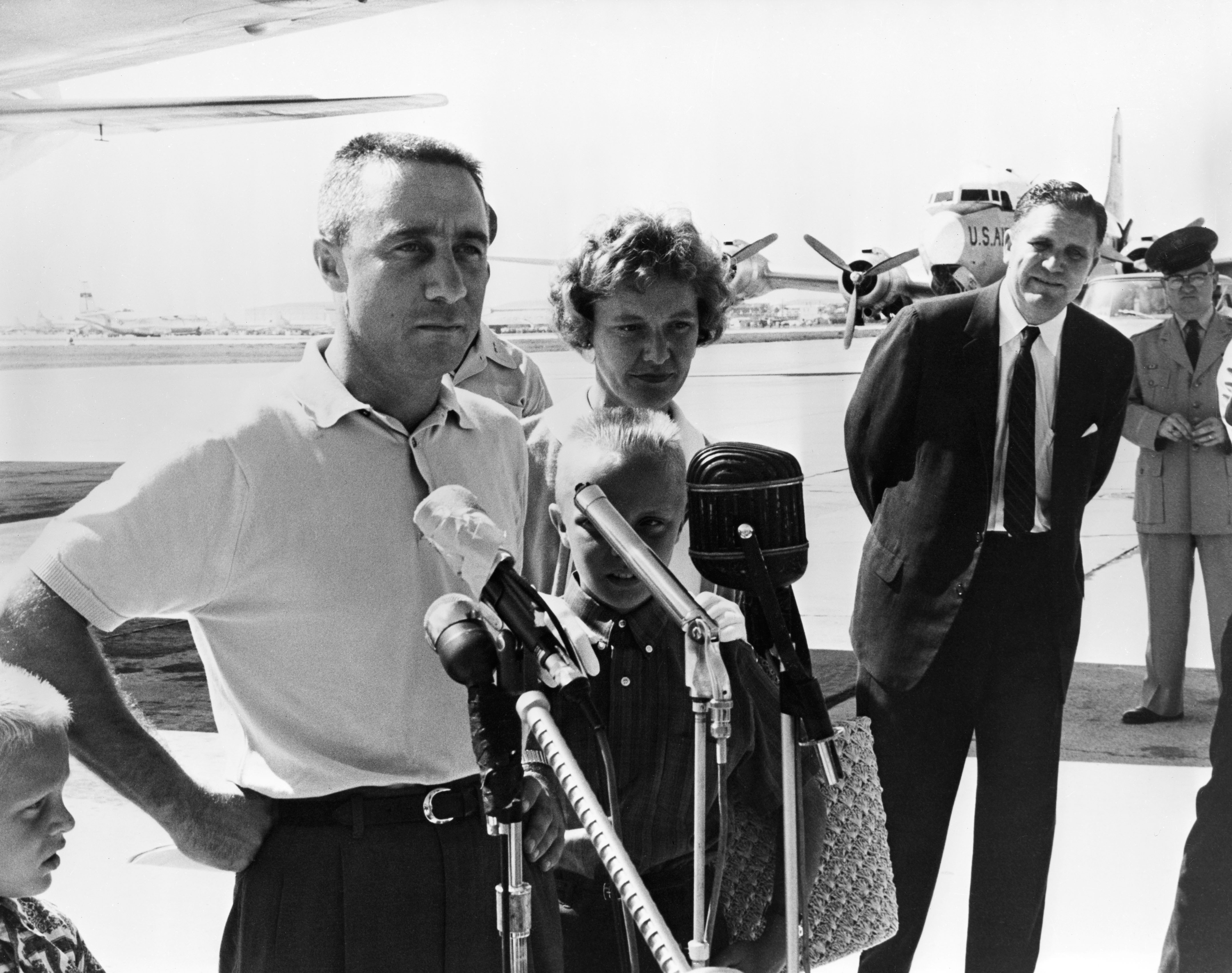
Gus Grissom (left), Betty Grissom (center), and NASA Administrator James E. Webb (right) speak to the media at Patrick Air Force Base, 1961

On January 27, 1967, Gus Grissom, along with fellow astronauts Roger Chaffee and Ed White, died when an electrical fire engulfed the Apollo 1 command module during testing at the Kennedy Space Center in Florida. When Ms. Grissom received the news she said that she had "already died 100,000 deaths" being married to an astronaut. Investigations concluded that the "most probable" cause of the fire was an electrical spark that set ablaze flammable insulation in the capsule, exacerbated by the pure oxygen atmosphere. Escape was prevented by a plug hatch that was impossible to open against the above-atmospheric pressure inside the cabin. These design flaws were fixed by NASA before the next crewed mission.

In 1971 Grissom filed a $10 million wrongful death lawsuit against the Apollo program's prime contractor, North American Rockwell. In 1972, she settled for $350,000, equivalent to $1.98 million in 2024. As a result of her legal action, the widows of Chaffee and White received $125,000 apiece. Following the Challenger explosion of 1986, Grissom encouraged the families of crew members killed in the incident to file lawsuits. Grissom's lawyer, Ronald D. Krist, went on to represent Cheryl McNair, widow of astronaut Ronald McNair, in her lawsuit against Morton Thiokol, the manufacturer of the solid rocket booster blamed for the Challenger accident.

In 1984, Grissom and the six surviving Mercury 7 astronauts created the Mercury 7 Foundation, later renamed the Astronaut Scholarship Foundation, which provides scholarships for science and engineering students.

Grissom died on October 7, 2018, at the age of 91. She outlived her husband by 51 years. Grissom is buried alongside her husband at Arlington National Cemetery.

== Publications ==
- Grissom, Betty; Still, Henry (1974). Starfall. New York: Crowell. ISBN 978-0-690-00473-1.
