= The Astronaut Wives Club =

2015 American television series

- Genre: Period drama
- Based on: The Astronaut; Wives Club by: Lily Koppel
- Developed by: Stephanie Savage
- Starring: JoAnna Garcia; Yvonne Strahovski; Dominique McElligott; Odette Annable; Erin Cummings; Azure Parsons; Zoe Boyle; Desmond Harrington; Bret Harrison; Wilson Bethel; Kenneth Mitchell; Joel Johnstone; Sam Reid; Aaron McCusker
- Composer: Pieter A. Schlosser
- Country of origin: United States
- Original language: English
- No. of seasons: 1
- No. of episodes: 10

Production
- Executive producers: Stephanie Savage; Josh Schwartz; Len Goldstein; Michael London
- Running time: 43 minutes
- Production companies: ABC Studios; Fake Empire; Groundswell Productions

Original release
- Network: ABC
- Release: June 18 – August 20, 2015

The Astronaut Wives Club is an American period drama television series developed by Stephanie Savage for ABC. It was based on Lily Koppel's 2013 book of the same name. The series told the story of the wives of the Mercury Seven – America's first group of astronauts – who together formed the Astronaut Wives Club. Actresses Dominique McElligott, Yvonne Strahovski, JoAnna Garcia, Erin Cummings, Azure Parsons, Zoe Boyle, and Odette Annable played the roles of the astronauts' wives.

The Astronaut Wives Club premiered on June 18, 2015. Following the completion of its run, the series' developer noted the series had been planned as a miniseries, telling a complete story. However, series creator Stephanie Savage revealed in an interview with Variety that the producers were interested in making the series an anthology in case it gained a renewal for a second season. Possible seasons would have featured wives of men in the 1920s, wives of World War II soldiers, wives of men who work on Wall Street, and wives of men in the 1980s, among other possible scenarios.

== Cast and characters ==
=== Main ===
- JoAnna Garcia as Betty Grissom
- Yvonne Strahovski as Rene Carpenter
- Dominique McElligott as Louise Shepard
- Odette Annable as Trudy Cooper
- Erin Cummings as Marge Slayton
- Azure Parsons as Annie Glenn
- Zoe Boyle as Jo Schirra
- Desmond Harrington as Alan Shepard
- Bret Harrison as Gordon Cooper
- Wilson Bethel as Scott Carpenter
- Aaron McCusker as Wally Schirra
- Kenneth Mitchell as Deke Slayton
- Sam Reid as John Glenn
- Joel Johnstone as Gus Grissom
- Luke Kirby as Max Kaplan

=== Recurring ===
- Evan Handler as Duncan "Dunk" Pringle
- Matt Lanter as Ed White
- Antonia Bernath as Susan Borman
- Stella Allen as Alice Shepard
- Madison Wolfe as Julie Shepard
- Lorelei Gilbert as Candy Carpenter
- Dana Gourrier as Antoinette Gibbs
- Haley Strode as Jane Conrad
- Holley Fain as Marilyn Lovell
- Nora Zehetner as Marilyn See
- Alexa Havins as Pat White
- Ryan Doom as Donn F. Eisele

== Production ==
The Astronaut Wives Club was originally scheduled to be broadcast during the 2013–14 American television season. On February 5, 2014, ABC officially ordered a limited series of ten episodes. It was expected to premiere on July 24, 2014, but was pushed to spring 2015 to undergo changes. It premiered on June 18, 2015.

== Episodes ==
No.	Title	Directed by	Written by	Original release date	US viewers (millions)
1	"Launch"	Lone Scherfig	Stephanie Savage	June 18, 2015	5.51
When NASA chooses seven men to fly into space, their wives' private lives become public.
2	"Protocol"	Lone Scherfig	Becky Hartman Edwards	June 25, 2015	4.50
The success of Alan Shepard's mission draws the eyes of the nation to his family.
3	"Retroattitude"	J. Miller Tobin	Liz Tigelaar	July 2, 2015	4.06
Rene Carpenter tells her story in a magazine interview and takes the spotlight off her husband, Scott.
4	"Liftoff"	J. Miller Tobin	Lisa Zwerling	July 9, 2015	4.28
The public life of Gordon and Trudy Cooper puts pressure on their private life.
5	"Flashpoint"	Elodie Keene	Derek Simonds	July 16, 2015	4.44
Trudy Cooper learns that NASA's senior officials believe that there is no place for women in space.
6	"In the Blind"	Patrick Norris	Nate DiMio	July 23, 2015	3.81
John Glenn leaves NASA for Washington, D.C.
7	"Rendezvous"	Elodie Keene	Becky Hartman Edwards	July 30, 2015	4.07
The Apollo program kicks off following the successful Gemini missions.
8	"Abort"	Patrick Norris	Liz Tigelaar	August 6, 2015	3.53
Betty Grissom has to deal with the death of her husband, Gus.
9	"The Dark Side"	Jon Amiel	Casallina Kisakye and Katie Schwartz	August 13, 2015	3.20
During civic unrest across the country, the wives endeavor to find their place in the world.
10	"Landing"	Jon Amiel	Stephanie Savage & Lisa Zwerling	August 20, 2015	3.81
Apollo 11's Lunar Module Eagle lands on the Moon.

== Reception ==
The Astronaut Wives Club has received mixed reviews. Review aggregator site, Metacritic, has given the series a "mixed or average" score of 60 out of 100, based on 23 critics. On another review aggregator site, Rotten Tomatoes, it holds a 50% rating, based on 28 reviews. The critical consensus there reads: "The Astronaut Wives relies on poorly paced storylines and clichéd characters, both used in service of a fact-based narrative that would have been better served in a more serious context."

== See also ==
- Apollo 11 in popular culture
- Men into Space
- The Cape (1996 TV series)
- The Right Stuff (TV series)
