= Rene Carpenter =

American newspaper columnist and local television host (1928–2020)

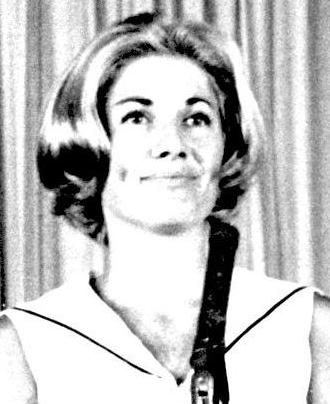
- Carpenter at a press conference in 1962
- Born: Rene Louise Mason; April 12, 1928; Clinton, Iowa, U.S.
- Died: July 24, 2020 (aged 92); Denver, Colorado, U.S.
- Occupations: Newspaper columnist and local television host
- Spouses: Scott Carpenter (m. 1948; div. 1972) Lester H. Shor (m. 1977)

Rene (Note: She is quoted as saying of her first name "It rhymes with keen.") Carpenter (April 12, 1928 – July 24, 2020) was an American newspaper columnist and host of two Washington, D.C., television shows. As the wife of Scott Carpenter, one of the Mercury Seven astronauts, she was a pioneering member of NASA's early spaceflight families.

== Early life and education ==
Carpenter was born in Clinton, Iowa, on April 12, 1928. Her mother, Olive (Olson) Mason, became one of the first female clerks at the station in Clinton, Iowa, for the Chicago and North Western Railway. Her husband (and Carpenter's father), Melville Francis Mason, had been a brakeman for Chicago and Northwestern but became unemployed during the Great Depression. They divorced in 1930, when Carpenter was two years old. Her mother married Lyle S. Price in 1935. He adopted Rene, and she took the Price surname as her own, becoming Rene Louise Price. The Price family moved to Boulder, Colorado, in 1941, and Price was educated in the Boulder public schools.

Price attended Boulder High School, writing for the school newspaper The Daily Owl, and graduated in 1946. She went on to study history at the University of Colorado, but dropped her studies when she married in the fall of 1948.

== Career ==
=== "Astronaut Wife" ===
In the late 1950s and through the 1960s, the astronauts and their wives became national celebrities, with exclusive LIFE magazine rights to their "personal stories"; the stresses of life in the public eye led the women of Mercury 7 to form an informal support group later called the Astronaut Wives Club. Carpenter was often singled out for her appearance. The Washington Post in 1961 described her as a "striking platinum blonde". In 1962, Time called her "by anyone's standards a dish". In 1975, People called her "the undisputed prom queen of the early space program." However, she also had writing talent. Life published Carpenter's first-person feature story on her experiences, both as a career military wife and during her husband's May 24, 1962, flight aboard Aurora 7.

In 2015, she was portrayed by Yvonne Strahovski in the miniseries The Astronaut Wives Club, based on the 2013 book by the same title. Carpenter herself was critical of both the book and the show, telling the Washington Post, it was "pure fiction."

Rene Carpenter has been credited for volunteering her husband for spaceflight, but Scott Carpenter, a lieutenant commander in the U.S. Navy, had already been identified as a candidate for Project Mercury at Phase 1, in late 1958 and had reported to the Pentagon in February 1959 for the Phase 2 briefings and interviews. It was at the Pentagon that Carpenter volunteered to proceed with the selection process. In late February 1959, with her husband aboard the USS Hornet on sea trials, Rene intercepted a letter from NASA inviting Scott Carpenter to report to the Lovelace Clinic for the Phase 3 selection trials. The USN lieutenant commander had been asked to reply "by Monday." Rene Carpenter opened the letter on a Tuesday morning, immediately calling the telephone number supplied, reaching NASA's manpower director Dr. Allen O. Gamble: "We volunteer," she exclaimed to a startled Dr. Gamble. Scott Carpenter reported to Lovelace in March with his small group and was ultimately selected as a Project Mercury astronaut.

Rene Carpenter began writing her syndicated column, "A Woman, Still," in 1965, ending the column in 1969. After their divorce, and at the invitation of Washington Post publisher Kay Graham, who owned the local CBS affiliate, WTOP, Carpenter developed and hosted a TV show entitled Everywoman, airing weekly on Saturday night. It took on then-controversial themes of the feminist movement.

=== Politics ===
In 1968, Carpenter campaigned for Robert Kennedy. She had a syndicated women's page column, "A Woman, Still" and, from 1972 to 1976, was a television host, first with Everywoman and then with Nine in the Morning. Carpenter also worked for Committee for National Health Insurance.

== Personal life ==
She first met Scott Carpenter when she was working as an 'usherette' at the Boulder Theater, where her husband-to-be was also an usher. They married in Boulder, Colorado, St. John's Episcopal Church, September 9, 1948. In November 1949, their first child, Marc Scott, was born in Boulder; thirteen months later, at Pensacola Naval Air Station, Florida, they welcomed a second son, Timothy. "Timmy" died at age six months, in San Diego, where Scott Carpenter was preparing for his tour of duty in the Korean conflict (1951–1954). The couple had three more children.

Scott Carpenter resigned from NASA in August 1967 and moved with Rene and their children to Bethesda, Md., where the U.S. Navy's Deep Sea Submergence Project (SEALAB) was headquartered. Rene continued writing her column until she and Scott separated in 1969, the same year Scott Carpenter resigned his U.S. Navy commission. The couple divorced in 1972. She married Lester H. Shor, a builder and real estate developer, in 1977. She continued to use her professional name, Rene Carpenter.

Rene Carpenter died of congestive heart failure on July 24, 2020, in a Denver hospital. She was 92. Of the fourteen men and women of Project Mercury, Rene was the last surviving member; Annie Glenn had died two months earlier, on May 19, 2020 at age 100.
