= Azure Parsons =

American actress (born 1984)

- Born: October 5, 1984 (age 40); New Orleans, Louisiana, U.S.
- Occupation: Actress
- Years active: 2004–present

Azure Parsons (born October 5, 1984) is an American actress. She has appeared in a number of films, including 2 Guns, Paradise, and Dark Places, and television shows like Death Valley, Castle, and True Detective. In 2014, Parsons was cast as a recurring character in the first season of the fantasy drama series Salem on WGN America. In 2016, she returned to recur in the third season of Salem. She starred as Annie Glenn on the ABC drama series The Astronaut Wives Club.

== Filmography ==
=== Film ===
Year	Title	Role	Notes
2004	Heart of the Storm	Hayley Broadbeck	Television movie
2005	Locusts: The 8th Plague	Stacy	Television movie
2005	Elvis	Actress	Television movie
2006	For One Night	Lily Dubois	Television movie
2008	Dada	Maid	Short film
2008	Quietus	Quietus	Short film
2008	Cleansed	Woman	Short film
2010	Career Advice	Tammy	Short film
2010	Camera Obscura	Magoria	
2010	My Name Is Kris Kringle	Kline	Short film
2010	Hypotheticals	Karen	Short film
2011	Kart Driver	Pauline	Short film
2012	Poe	Gillette Alexander	
2012	Leprechaun's Revenge	Officer Jen Peterson	Television movie
2012	Slumber Party	Kristen	Short film
2013	Samuel Bleak	Margo	
2013	2 Guns	Maggie	
2013	Paradise	Charlie	
2015	Dark Places	—	Uncredited
2023	Hanky Panky	Lillith	

=== Television ===
Year	Title	Role	Notes
2008–2009	The Young and the Restless	Crystal	4 episodes
2011	Castle	Ginny	Episode: "Rise"
2011	Death Valley	Aurora	3 episodes
2014	True Detective	Charmaine Boudreaux	Episode: "Haunted Houses"
2014–2017	Salem	Gloriana Embry	12 episodes
2015	The Astronaut Wives Club	Annie Glenn	10 episodes
