= VP-18 =

Patrol Squadron 18
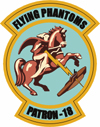
- VP-18 insignia
- Active: May 1946-10 October 1968
- Country: United States
- Branch: Navy
- Type: Squadron
- Role: Antisubmarine Patrol
- Part of: United States Navy/Naval Air Forces/Patrol Wing
- Nickname(s): Flying Phantoms

Aircraft flown
- Patrol: PV-2 Harpoon; P2V Neptune; P-3 Orion

VP-18, nicknamed the Flying Phantoms, was a Patrol Squadron of the U.S. Navy. Originally established as Reserve Patrol Squadron VP-914 in May 1946, redesignated Medium Patrol Squadron VP-ML-64 on 15 November 1946, redesignated VP-861 in February 1950, redesignated VP-18 on 4 February 1953 and disestablished on 10 October 1968. It was the third squadron to be designated VP-18, the first VP-18 was redesignated VP-13 on 1 July 1939, and the second VP-18 was redesignated VPB-18 on 1 October 1944.

== Operational history ==
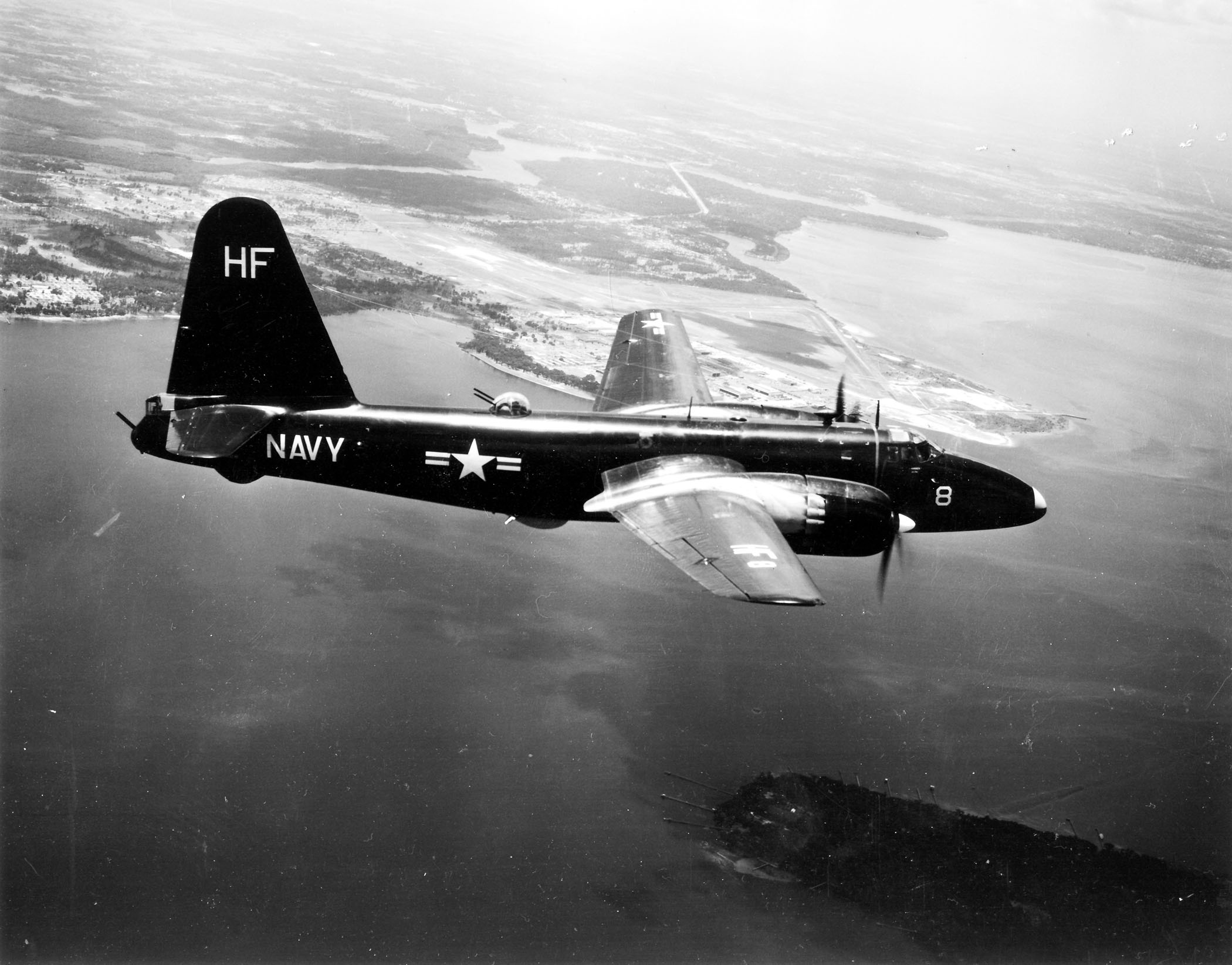
VP-18 P2V-2 over NAS Jacksonville in 1952

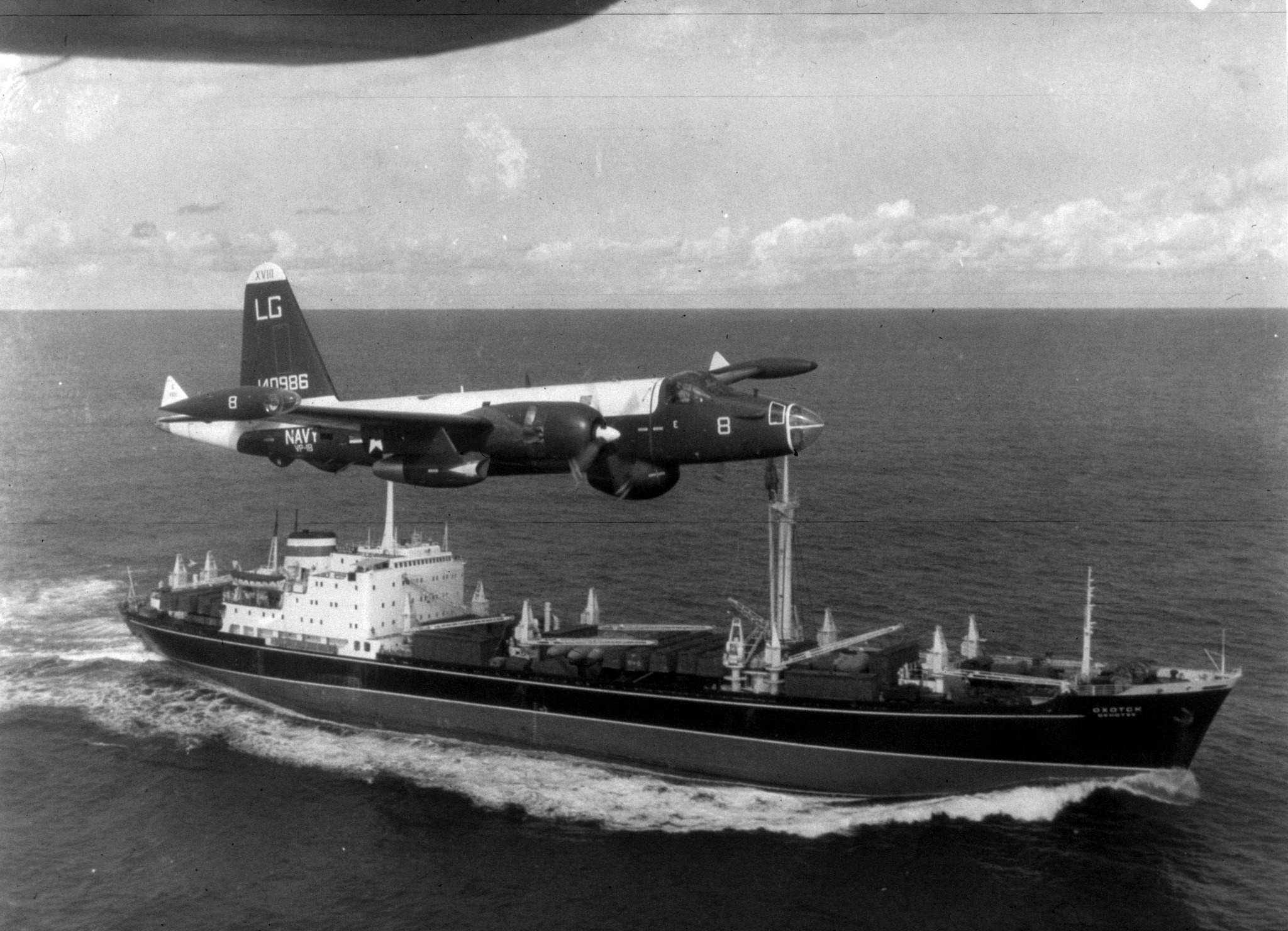
VP-18 P2H over a Soviet freighter during the Cuban Missile Crisis, October 1962

- May 1946: VP-914 was established at NAS Norfolk, Virginia. The squadron came under the operational control of FAW-11 and administrative control by Naval Air Reserve Training (NART). Another of the 21 reserve squadrons established after the war to accommodate the large number of aircrews recently released from active duty and utilize the enormous stocks of aircraft in the inventory. The squadron flew the PV-2 Harpoon.
- 15 November 1946: All patrol squadrons were redesignated. Regular Navy patrol squadron designation numbers began with 1 and reserve patrol squadrons began with 5. VP-914 was redesignated VP-ML-64. The ML designation, medium patrol squadrons, included twin engine medium amphibious seaplanes, as well as twin-engine land-based bombers. Regular Navy patrol squadrons with the ML designation were for twin-engine medium land-based bombers only.
- February 1950: VP-ML-64 was redesignated VP-861 during the reorganization of Naval Aviation reserve units in 1949, but the change did not take effect until February 1950. During this period the number of Naval Aviation reserve squadrons was reduced from the 1949 total of 24 to nine.
- 1 September 1950: VP-861 was among the first of the reserve patrol squadrons called to active duty for service during the Korean War. The squadron had by this date converted to the Lockheed P2V-2 and P2V-3 Neptune. None of the recalled reserve squadrons of the Atlantic Fleet Command served in Korea.
- January–June 1953: The squadron deployed to Luqa Airfield, Malta. In June, the squadron flew two P2V-3s on a 12,000-mile familiarization flight to acquaint allies with the new patrol bomber.
- 4 February 1953: The decision was made to augment all of the recalled reserve patrol squadrons to regular Navy patrol squadrons. VP-861 was redesignated VP-18. The conversions did not necessitate changes in tail codes or home ports.
- April 1954: VP-18 began a five-month deployment to Naval Station Argentia, Newfoundland. During this period, a VP-18 aircraft became the first P2V-5 and first FAW-11 aircraft to fly over the North Pole.
- 1 March–April 1955: VP-18 received the first of its new P2V-7 aircraft with improved electronics, cockpit, enlarged bomb bays and jet engine auxiliaries. In April a detachment of six of the squadron aircraft made several public relations stops along the East Coast to display the new bomber while en route to their deployment site at San Juan, Puerto Rico.
- 15 September 1955: VP-18 deployed to Naval Air Station Keflavik, Iceland. The Icelandic government requested assistance in ridding its fishing fleet of killer whale attacks on their herring drift nets. Permission was obtained, and three squadron aircraft destroyed approximately 40 to 50 whales in less than 25 minutes with depth bomb and strafing attacks. The new Neptunes maintained a 92 percent availability rate during this period, despite bad weather conditions and only four hours of daylight.
- November 1957: VP-18 participated in the recovery effort in the Caribbean of an Army Jupiter missile nose cone. This nose cone later appeared on a nationwide telecast as President Dwight D. Eisenhower explained how the U.S. had solved the space reentry problem.
- April–June 1958: VP-18 participated in the pre-Mercury primate space program recovery missions in the Caribbean.
- May 1959: VP-18 deployed two aircraft to Panama to help the Organization of American States (OAS) counter an invasion by Cuban guerrilla forces. During the same period a second detachment of three aircraft participated in the recovery of two primates, Able and Baker, that had reentered the atmosphere after being rocketed into space. The capsule was recovered from the Atlantic east of Puerto Rico.
- 1 September 1960: VP-18 established new airborne endurance record of 20 hours and 33 minutes for the P2V-7 Neptune in the Caribbean.
- January 1961: VP-18 participated in the search for the hijacked Portuguese cruise liner Santa Maria in the Caribbean area. Later that same month, squadron aircraft participated in the successful recovery of the space capsule containing the monkey Ham.
- 24 May 1962: VP-18 participated in space program recovery missions for a Mercury flight piloted by Lieutenant Commander M. Scott Carpenter. The squadron's aircraft number 6 was first on the scene, directing helicopters from USS Intrepid to the capsule.
- 21 October 1962: VP-18 was one of several patrol squadrons deployed during the Cuban Missile Crisis, and remained deployed during the entire Cuban Quarantine operation.
- 30 November 1962: One of the squadron's aircraft was the first to spot the missing Nina II approximately 800 miles east of Puerto Rico. The vessel, a reproduction of one of Columbus’ original three sailing ships, became the subject of an international search after it failed to arrive at its destination of San Salvador as scheduled. The crew of the Neptune aircraft dropped emergency supplies, including a new sextant, enabling the vessel to complete its journey.
- 30 April–26 May 1965: VP-18 provided patrol coverage and surveillance flights of the waters around the island of Hispaniola during the Dominican Civil War. Continuous coverage was given through 26 May 1965.
- 10 October 1968: VP-18 was disestablished at NAS Roosevelt Roads, Puerto Rico.

== Home port assignments ==
The squadron was assigned to these home ports, effective on the dates shown:

- NAS Norfolk – May 1946
- NAS Jacksonville – 1 Sep 1950
- NAS Roosevelt Roads – 1 Nov 1964

== Aircraft assignment ==
The squadron first received the following aircraft on the dates shown:

- PV-2 Harpoon – May 1946
- P2V-2/P2V3 Neptune – September 1950
- P2V-5 Neptune – March 1954
- P2V-7 Neptune – March 1955

== See also ==
- Maritime patrol aircraft
- Squadron (aviation)
- Naval aviation
- List of inactive United States Navy aircraft squadrons
- List of United States Navy aircraft squadrons
- List of squadrons in the Dictionary of American Naval Aviation Squadrons
- History of the United States Navy
