= Scott Carpenter =

American astronaut and aquanaut (1925–2013)

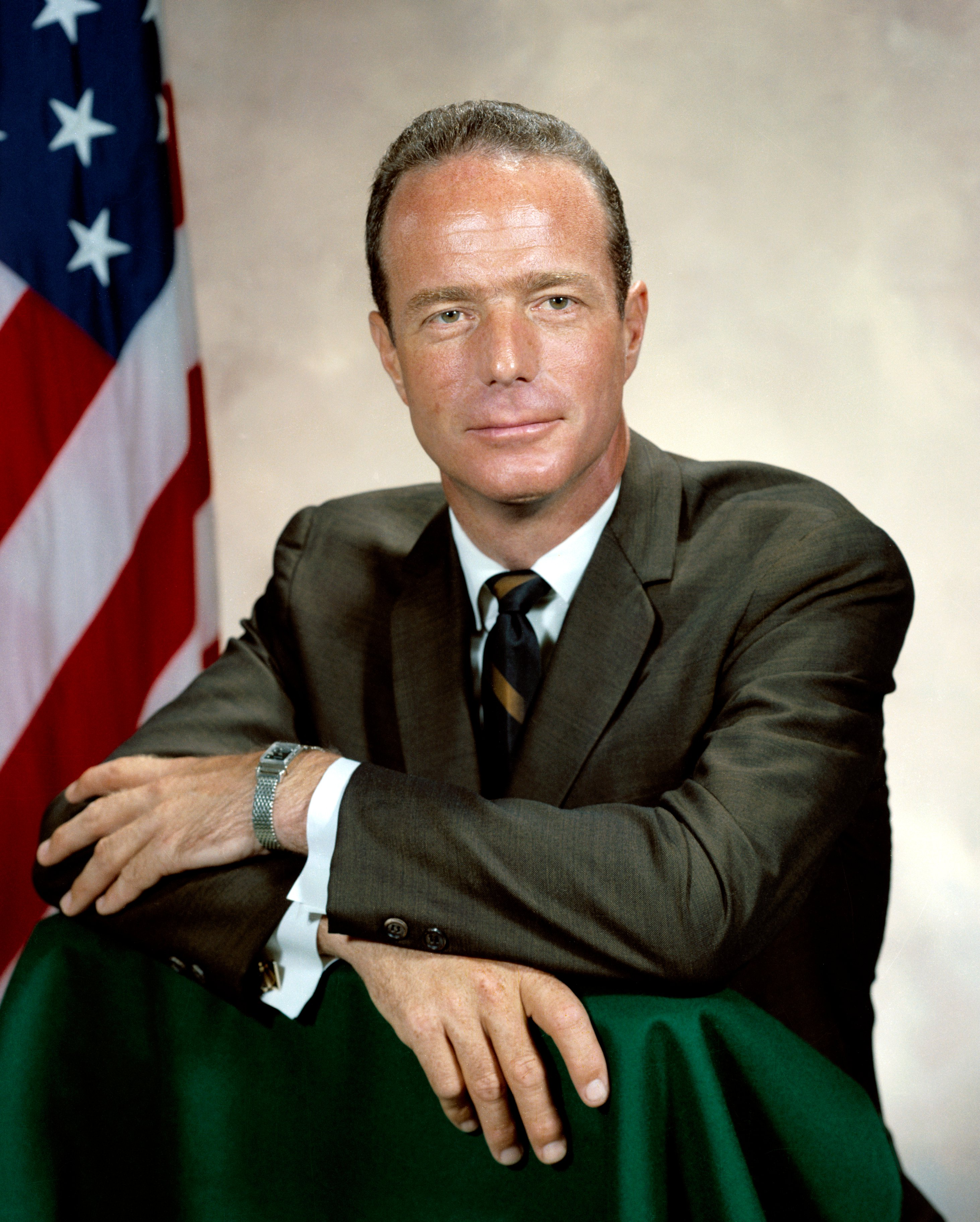
- Carpenter in 1964
- Born: Malcolm Scott Carpenter; May 1, 1925; Boulder, Colorado, U.S.
- Died: October 10, 2013 (aged 88); Denver, Colorado, U.S.
- Education: University of Colorado, Boulder (BS)
- Spouse: Rene Mason (m. 1948; div. 1972)
- Awards: Legion of Merit; Distinguished Flying Cross; NASA Distinguished Service Medal
- Space career

NASA astronaut
- Rank: Commander, USN
- Time in space: 4h 56m
- Selection: NASA Group 1 (1959)
- Mission: Mercury-Atlas 7
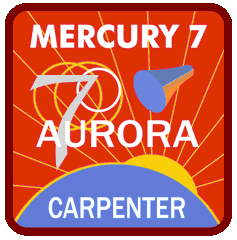
- Mission insignia
- Retired: August 10, 1967

Malcolm Scott Carpenter (May 1, 1925 – October 10, 2013) was an American naval officer and aviator, test pilot, aeronautical engineer, astronaut, and aquanaut. He was one of the Mercury Seven astronauts selected for NASA's Project Mercury in April 1959. Carpenter was the second American (after John Glenn) to orbit the Earth and the fourth American in space, after Alan Shepard, Gus Grissom, and Glenn.

Commissioned into the U.S. Navy in 1949, Carpenter became a naval aviator, flying a Lockheed P-2 Neptune with Patrol Squadron 6 (VP-6) on reconnaissance and anti-submarine warfare missions along the coasts of the Soviet Union and China during the Korean War and the Cold War. In 1954, he attended the U.S. Naval Test Pilot School at NAS Patuxent River in Maryland and became a test pilot. In 1958, he was named Air Intelligence Officer of USS Hornet, which was then in dry dock at the Bremerton Navy Yard.

The following year, Carpenter was selected as one of the Mercury Seven astronauts. He was backup to Glenn during the latter's Mercury Atlas 6 orbital mission. Carpenter flew the next mission, Mercury Atlas 7, in the spacecraft he named Aurora 7. Due to a series of malfunctions, the spacecraft landed 250 miles (400 km) downrange from its intended splashdown point, but both pilot and spacecraft were retrieved.

In 1964, Carpenter obtained permission from NASA to take a leave of absence to join the U.S. Navy SEALAB project as an aquanaut. During training he suffered injuries that grounded him, making him unavailable for further spaceflights. In 1965, he spent 28 days living on the ocean floor off the coast of California as part of SEALAB II. He returned to NASA as Executive Assistant to the Director of the Manned Spacecraft Center, then joined the Navy's Deep Submergence Systems Project in 1967 as Director of Aquanaut Operations for SEALAB III. He retired from NASA in 1967 and the Navy in 1969, with the rank of commander.

Carpenter became a consultant to sport and diving manufacturers, and to the film industry on space flight and oceanography. He gave talks and appeared in television documentaries. He was involved in projects related to biological pest control and waste disposal, and for the production of energy from industrial and agricultural wastes. He appeared in television commercials and wrote a pair of technothrillers and an autobiography, For Spacious Skies: The Uncommon Journey of a Mercury Astronaut, co-written with his daughter, Kristen Stoever.

== Early life ==
Malcolm Scott Carpenter was born on May 1, 1925, in Boulder, Colorado, the son of Dr. Marion Scott Carpenter (1901–1973), a research chemist, and Florence Kelso (née Noxon, known in her family as "Toye"; 1900–1962). Carpenter, known in his childhood as Bud or Buddy, moved with his parents to New York City, where his father had been awarded a postdoctoral research post at Columbia University, in 1925.

In the summer of 1927, Carpenter's mother, who was ill with tuberculosis, returned to Boulder, taking him with her. (In those days, mountain air was believed to aid recovery). Her condition deteriorated, and she entered the Mesa Vista Sanatorium in 1930. She recovered sufficiently to become chief medical librarian at Boulder Community Hospital in 1945. Carpenter's father remained in New York, but found it hard to find work during the Great Depression. Eventually his father secured a good position at Givaudan. Carpenter's parents divorced in 1945, and his father remarried.

Carpenter lived with his maternal grandparents in the family home at the corner of Aurora Avenue and Seventh Street. He later denied naming his spacecraft Aurora 7 after Aurora Avenue. He was educated at University Hill Elementary School in Boulder and Boulder High School, where he played the clarinet, was a cheerleader, and served on the editorial board of the student newspaper. He was a Boy Scout, and earned the rank of Second Class Scout.

== Naval service ==
Like many teenagers in Boulder, Carpenter was deeply affected by the attack on Pearl Harbor, which brought the United States into World War II, and he resolved to become a naval aviator. On February 12, 1943, he went to the U.S. Navy's recruiting office at Lowry Field near Denver and applied to join the Navy's V-5 Aviation Cadet Training Program. After obtaining his father's permission, he traveled to the headquarters of the 12th Naval District in San Francisco, where he passed physical and written examinations, and was accepted for training as an aviation cadet on April 11.

The Navy had a large number of potential aviators in the pipeline at this time, so to retain young men like Carpenter, the V-12 Navy College Training Program was created, whereby cadets attended college until training positions became available. When Carpenter graduated from high school in 1943, he became a V-12A aviation cadet at Colorado College in Colorado Springs. Three semesters there were followed by six months of preflight training at Saint Mary's College of California in Moraga, California, and primary flight training at Ottumwa, Iowa, in a Stearman N2S for four months. The war ended before he finished training, so the Navy released him from active duty in September 1945.

After visiting his father and stepmother in New York, Carpenter returned to Boulder in November 1945 to study aeronautical engineering at the University of Colorado. He was given credit for his previous study, and entered as a junior. While there he joined Delta Tau Delta International Fraternity. He was severely injured in a car accident on September 14, 1946, after he fell asleep at the wheel of his 1934 Ford. The car went over a cliff and overturned. At the end of his senior year, he missed his final examination in heat transfer; a washed-out bridge prevented him from getting to class. This left him one requirement short of a degree. (Note: On May 29, 1962, after his Mercury spaceflight, the University of Colorado granted Carpenter his Bachelor of Science degree, on the grounds that "his subsequent training as an astronaut more than made up for the deficiency in the subject of heat transfer.")

Carpenter met Rene Louise Price, a fellow student at the University of Colorado, where she studied history and music at the campus bookstore, where she worked part-time. She was a member of the Delta Delta Delta sorority. Her parents had also separated when she was young, and her mother too suffered from tuberculosis. They were married at St. John's Episcopal Church in Boulder in September 1948.

Plans to retake his heat transfer course were put aside when Carpenter was recruited by the Navy's Direct Procurement Program (DPP) as its 500th candidate. Through an oversight, the Navy assumed that he had earned his degree. He reported for duty on October 31, 1949, at Naval Air Station Pensacola, Florida, for pre-flight training. He graduated from pre-flight training on March 6, 1950, and then commenced primary flight training at Naval Air Station Whiting Field, learning to fly in an SNJ trainer. He then went on to Naval Air Station Corpus Christi for advanced training. Most newly-trained naval aviators—including Carpenter—aspired to fly jet fighters, but in view of his responsibilities as a husband and father (his first child was born on January 20, 1950, and Rene was pregnant with a second), he elected the less dangerous option of flying multi-engine patrol aircraft. Rene disagreed with this decision. His advanced training was in the Consolidated PB4Y-2 Privateer, a single-tail version of the Consolidated B-24 Liberator. Rene pinned his aviator wings on him on April 19, 1951, signifying completion of his flight training.

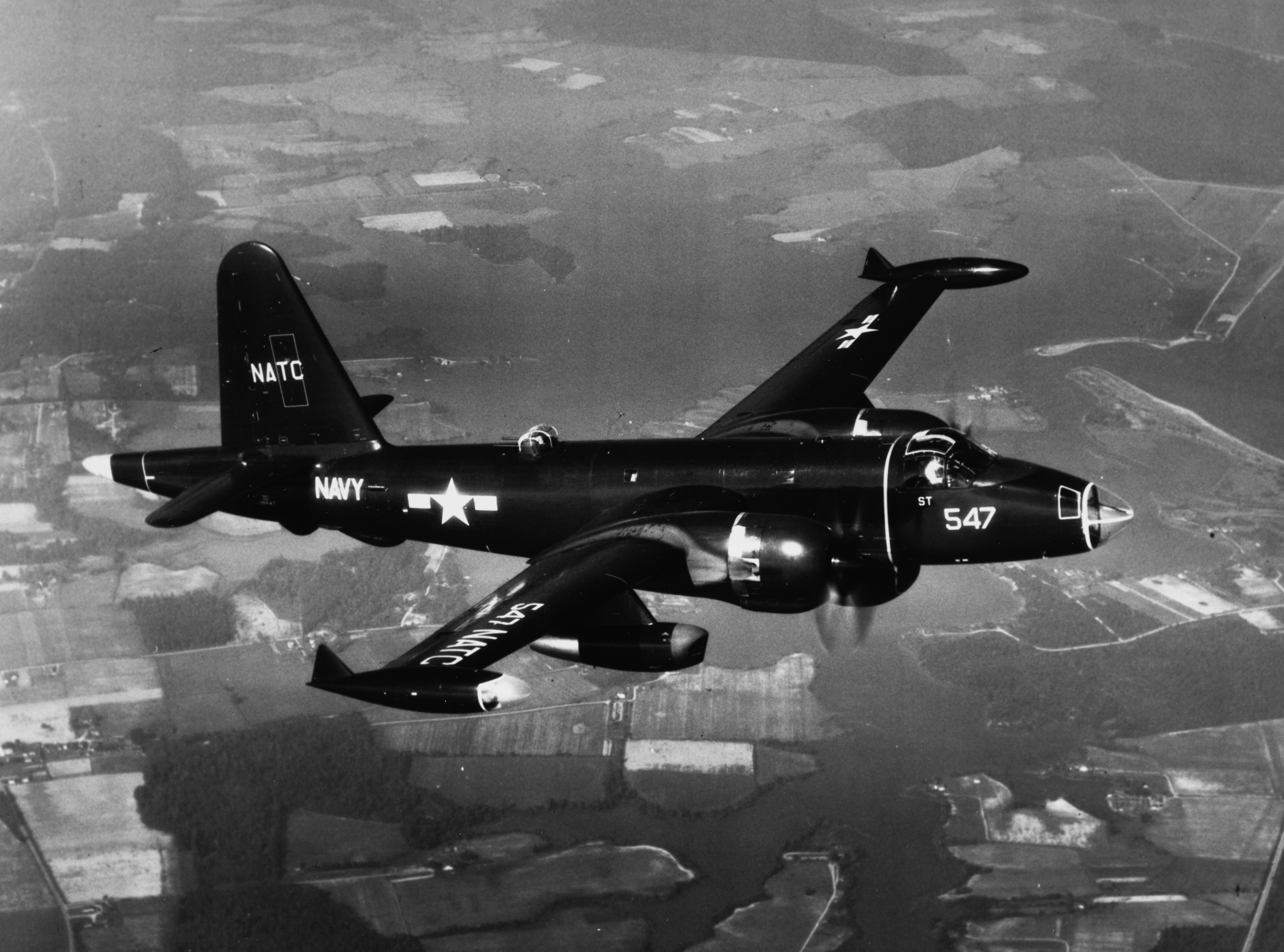
A Lockheed P2V Neptune in flight near NAS Patuxent River in 1954

After three months at the Fleet Airborne Electronics Training School in San Diego, California, Carpenter went to a P2V Neptune transitional training unit at Whidbey Island, Washington, after which he was assigned to Patrol Squadron 6 (VP-6), based at Naval Air Station Barbers Point, Hawaii, in November 1951. On his first deployment, Carpenter flew on reconnaissance and anti-submarine warfare missions from Naval Air Station Atsugi in Japan during the Korean War. The missions could be dangerous: on November 6, 1951, one of his squadron's aircraft was shot down over the Sea of Japan by two Soviet Lavochkin La-11 fighters, with the loss of all ten crew.

On his second deployment, forward-based at Naval Air Facility Adak, Alaska, he flew surveillance missions along the Soviet and Chinese coasts. For his third and final deployment, he was based on Guam, flying missions off the coast of China. He was designated as patrol plane commander, the only one in VP-6 with the rank of lieutenant (junior grade)—all the rest held higher rank.

Impressed with his performance, the commanding officer of VP-6, Commander Guy Howard, recommended Carpenter's appointment to the U.S. Naval Test Pilot School. Carpenter was part of Class 13, at NAS Patuxent River, Maryland, in 1954. He flew aircraft such as the AD Skyraider and the Martin P4M Mercator. For the first time, he flew jets, including the F9F Panther, F11F Tiger and A3D Skywarrior. He remained at Patuxent River until 1957, working as a test pilot in the Electronics Test Division.

Carpenter attended the Navy General Line School in Monterey, California, in 1957, and then the Naval Air Intelligence School at NAS Anacostia in Washington D.C. In 1958 he was named Air Intelligence Officer of USS Hornet, which was in dry dock at the Bremerton Navy Yard.

== NASA career ==
=== Mercury Seven ===
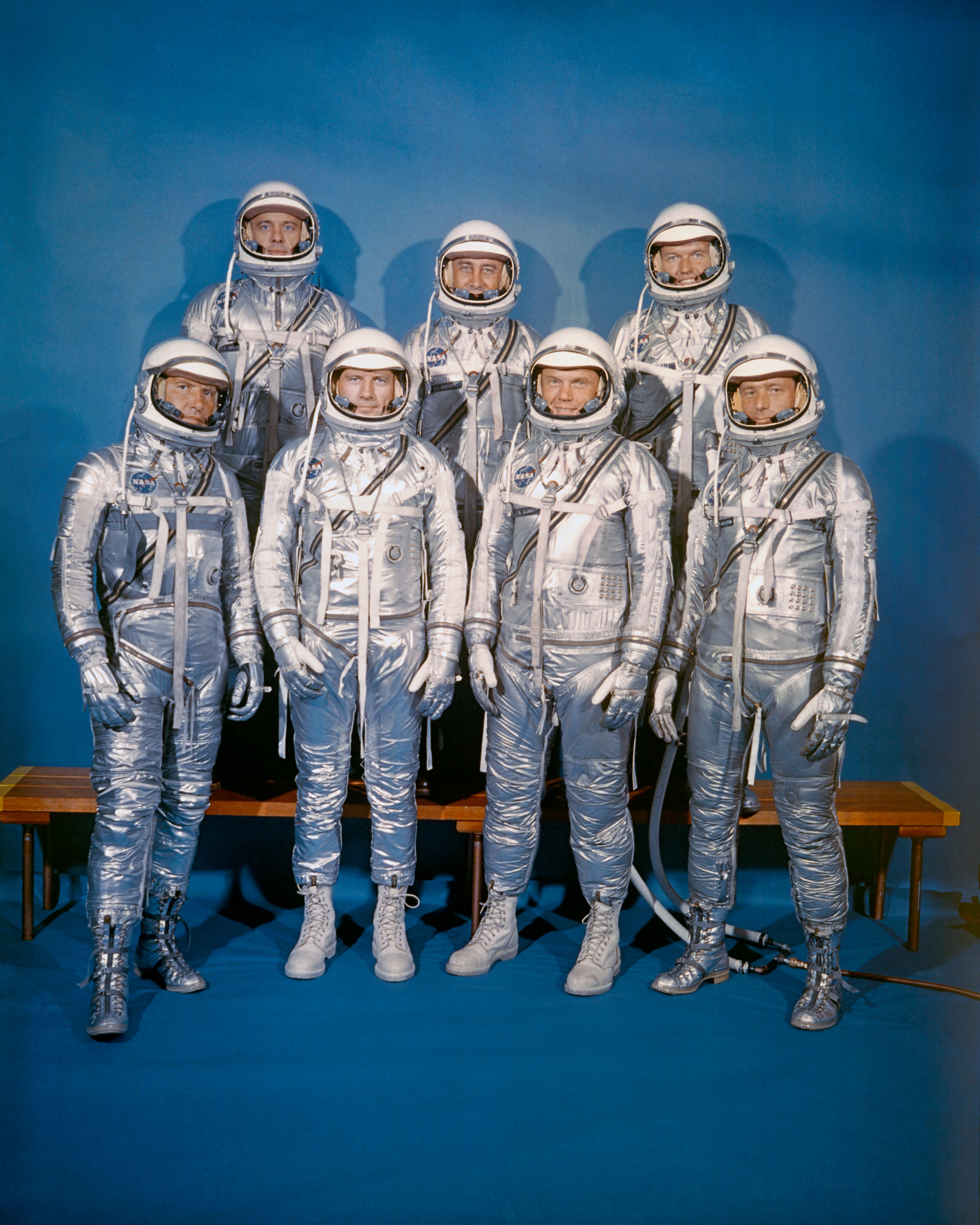
The Mercury Seven astronauts. Front row, left to right, Wally Schirra, Deke Slayton, John Glenn, and Carpenter; back row, Alan Shepard, Gus Grissom and Gordon Cooper.

On October 4, 1957, the Soviet Union launched Sputnik 1, the first artificial satellite. This shattered Americans' confidence in their technological superiority, creating a wave of anxiety known as the Sputnik crisis. Among his responses, President Dwight D. Eisenhower launched the Space Race. The National Aeronautics and Space Administration (NASA) was established on October 1, 1958, as a civilian agency to develop space technology. One of its first initiatives was Project Mercury, which aimed to launch a man into Earth orbit, evaluate his capabilities in space, and return him safely to the Earth.

The first astronaut intake was drawn from the ranks of military test pilots. The service records of 508 graduates of test pilot schools were obtained from the Department of Defense. Of these, 110 met the minimum standards: the candidates had to be younger than 40, possess a bachelor's degree or equivalent and to be 5 feet 11 inches (1.80 m) or less. While these were not all strictly enforced, the height requirement was firm, owing to the size of the Project Mercury spacecraft. DPP was restricted to those with bachelor's degrees, so it was assumed that Carpenter had one.

On February 2, 1959, the first 35 candidates went to The Pentagon, where they met with the Chief of Naval Operations, Admiral Arleigh Burke, and the Chief of Staff of the United States Air Force, General Thomas D. White, who assured them that the services would support them if they volunteered to become astronauts, and that their professional progress and promotions would not be affected. The number of candidates was reduced to 32, which the NASA selection panel considered to be an adequate number from which to select 12 astronauts. The degree of interest also indicated that far fewer would drop out during training than anticipated, which would result in training astronauts who would not be required to fly Project Mercury missions. It was therefore decided to halve the number of astronauts.

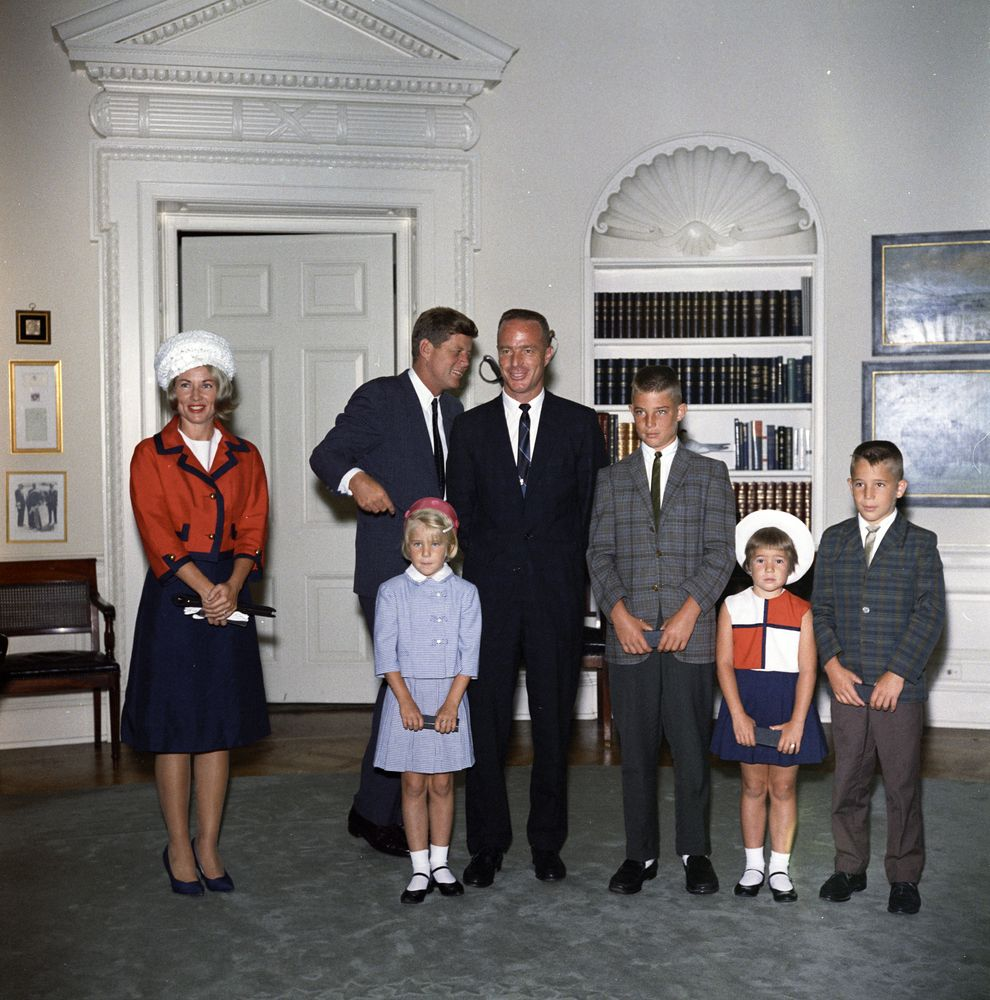
Carpenter and his family visit the White House. Left to right: Rene, President John F. Kennedy, Kristen, Carpenter, Scott, Candace and Jay.

Then came a grueling series of physical and psychological tests at the Lovelace Clinic and the Wright Aerospace Medical Laboratory. Carpenter had the lowest body fat, scored highest on the treadmill and cycling tests, and was able to hold his breath the longest. This was despite the fact that he had smoked a pack of cigarettes a day since joining the Navy in 1943, and did not quit smoking until 1985.

NASA's Charles J. Donlan called Carpenter's home on April 3, 1959, to inform him that he had been one of the seven men selected. Rene answered; Carpenter was on Hornet, but she could reach him. Carpenter called Donlan from a wharfside pay phone to accept the offer, but Hornet's skipper, Captain Marshall W. White, refused to release him. Donlan called Burke, who contacted White and promised to send him another intelligence officer, but told him that the country needed Carpenter for the NASA assignment.

The identities of the seven were announced at a press conference at Dolley Madison House in Washington, D.C., on April 9, 1959: Carpenter, Gordon Cooper, John Glenn, Gus Grissom, Wally Schirra, Alan Shepard, and Deke Slayton. The magnitude of the challenge ahead of them was made clear a few weeks later, on the night of May 18, 1959, when the seven astronauts gathered at Cape Canaveral to watch their first rocket launch, of an SM-65D Atlas, which was similar to the one that would carry them into orbit. A few minutes after liftoff, it spectacularly exploded, lighting up the night sky. The astronauts were stunned. Shepard turned to Glenn and said: "Well, I'm glad they got that out of the way."

=== Mercury-Atlas 7 ===
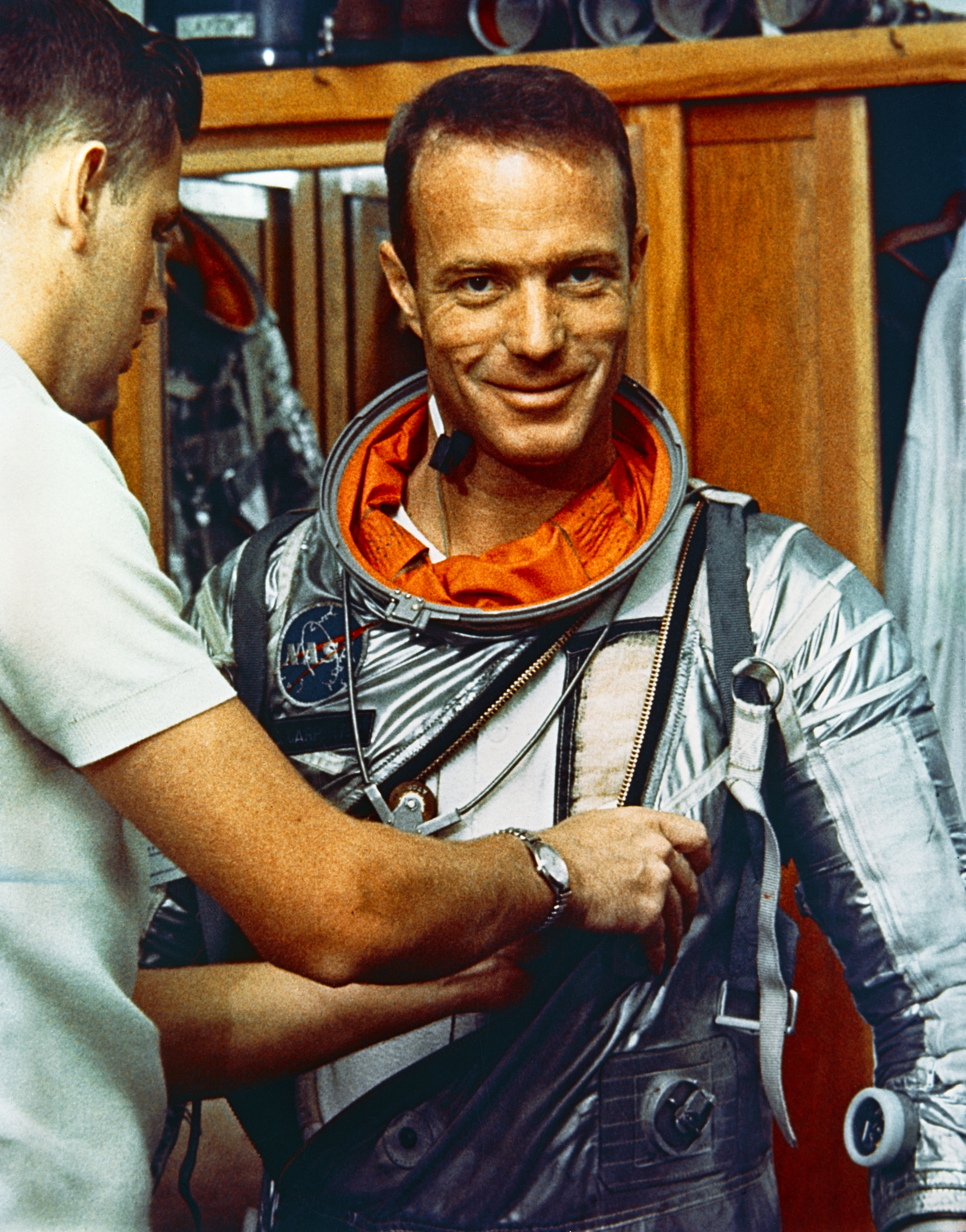
Carpenter is assisted into his pressure suit in the crew quarters of Hangar S at Cape Canaveral Air Force Station on the morning of the flight of Mercury Atlas 7.

==== Mission ====
Carpenter, along with the other six Mercury astronauts, participated in the development of the Mercury spacecraft. Each had a specialty; Carpenter's was the onboard navigational equipment. He served as backup pilot on Mercury-Atlas 6 for Glenn, who flew the first U.S. orbital mission aboard Friendship 7 in February 1962. Carpenter, serving as capsule communicator on this flight, can be heard saying "Godspeed, John Glenn" on the recording of Glenn's liftoff.

The next mission, a second crewed orbital flight, was to be flown by Slayton in a spacecraft he would have named Delta 7, but Slayton was suddenly grounded for an atrial fibrillation. Carpenter was assigned to replace him instead of Slayton's backup, Schirra, as Carpenter had more training time in the simulators. In contrast to Glenn's flight, Mercury-Atlas 7 was planned as a scientific mission rather than an engineering one.

After the most trouble-free countdown of Project Mercury to date, Carpenter flew into space on May 24, 1962, watched by 40 million television viewers. He performed five onboard experiments per the flight plan, (Note: Experiments were ground flare visibility; air glow observations; photography; zero-G liquid behavior; and a tethered inflatable balloon experiment.) and became the first American astronaut to eat solid food in space. He also identified the mysterious "fireflies" observed by Glenn during Friendship 7 as particles of frozen liquid loosened from the outside of the spacecraft, which he could produce by rapping on the wall near the window. He renamed them "frostflies".

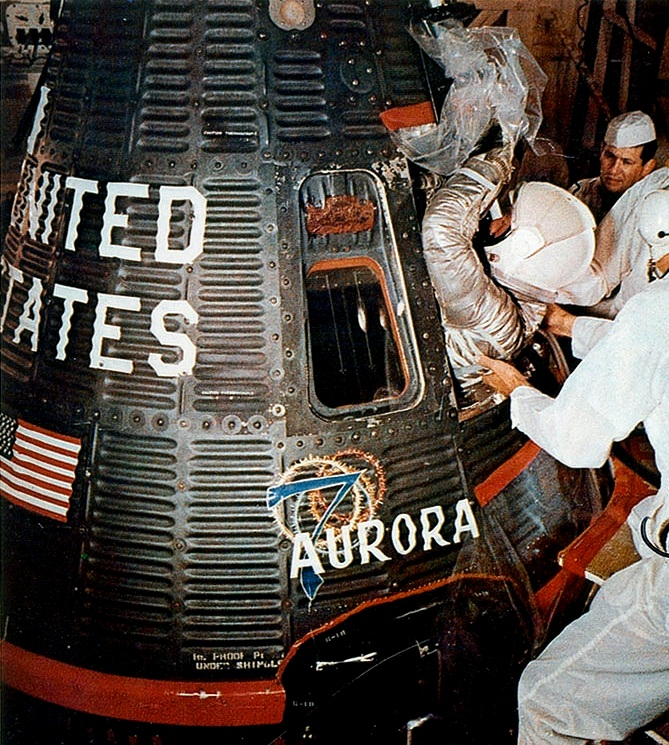
Carpenter is helped into his Aurora 7 spacecraft on May 24, 1962.

Unnoticed by ground control or the pilot, an overexpenditure of fuel was caused by an intermittently malfunctioning pitch horizon scanner (PHS). Still, NASA later reported that Carpenter had:

exercised his manual controls with ease in a number of [required] spacecraft maneuvers and had made numerous and valuable observations in the interest of space science. ... By the time he drifted near Hawaii on the third pass, Carpenter had successfully maintained more than 40 percent of his fuel in both the automatic and the manual tanks. According to mission rules, this ought to be quite enough hydrogen peroxide, reckoned Kraft, to thrust the capsule into the retrofire attitude, hold it, and then to reenter the atmosphere using either the automatic or the manual control system.

At the retrofire event, the PHS malfunctioned once more, forcing Carpenter to manually control his reentry. This caused him to overshoot the planned splashdown point in the Atlantic Ocean by 250 mi (400 km). The PHS malfunction yawed the spacecraft 25 degrees to the right, accounting for 170 miles (270 km) of overshoot; the delay caused by the automatic sequencer required Carpenter to fire the retrorockets manually. This effort took two pushes of the override button and accounted for another 15 to 20 miles (30 km) of overshoot. The thrusters had a set ignition sequence, and this sequence was delayed by Carpenter manually firing them. This added another 60 miles (100 km), producing a 250-mile (400 km) overshoot. Had Carpenter not assumed manual control, the overshoot would have been greater still. The spacecraft splashed down at 19°27'N, 63°59'W, about 50 nmi (93 km; 58 mi) north of Anegada in the British Virgin Islands. The flight lasted 4 hours and 56 minutes, during which Aurora 7 had attained a maximum altitude of 166 miles (267 km) and an orbital velocity of 17,532 miles per hour (28,215 km/h) and traveled 81,358 miles (130,933 km).

==== Recovery ====
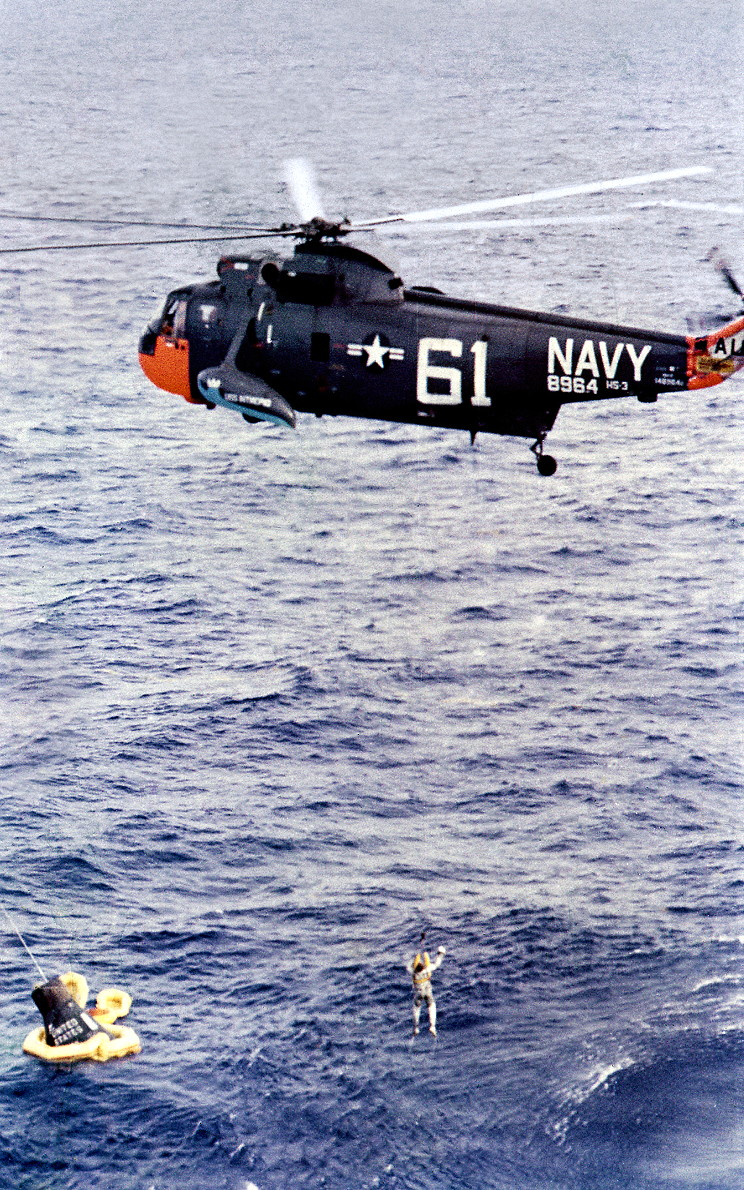
Carpenter is plucked from the water.

There was a great deal of public concern over whether Carpenter had survived. Broadcasting from a CBS news van in Florida, Walter Cronkite painted a grim picture. Although Aurora 7's Search And Rescue And Homing (SARAH) beacon broadcast its precise location, and the recovery vessels, the aircraft carrier USS Intrepid and the destroyer USS John R. Pierce, were on their way, NASA did not pass this information along to the news media. Cronkite reported that "while thousands watch and pray, certainly here at Cape Canaveral, the silence is almost intolerable."

Knowing that the recovery vessels might take some time to get to him, and aware of the danger of Aurora 7 foundering, as had happened to Grissom's Liberty Bell 7, Carpenter made his way out through the neck of the spacecraft, something the less agile Glenn had been unable to do. He inflated his life raft, climbed into it, and awaited rescue. The sea around him was stained with green dye released to attract the rescue helicopter. The life raft had no radio.

About 36 minutes after splashdown, Carpenter spotted two aircraft. A P2V Neptune from Patrol Squadron 18 flying out of Naval Air Station Jacksonville was the first to sight and mark Carpenter's position. It was followed by a Piper Apache, which circled and photographed. Carpenter then knew he had been located. They were followed by SC-54 Skymaster aircraft, one of which parachuted two frogmen, Airman First Class John F. Heitsch and Sergeant Ray McClure, while another dropped a flotation collar that the frogmen attached to Aurora 7. A radio battery was dropped, but not the radio. An Air Force SA-16 Albatross arrived to collect them, but NASA Mission Control forbade it for fear that the seaplane might break up, although the crew did not consider the swell dangerous. After three hours, Carpenter was picked up by a HSS-2 Sea King helicopter, which took him to Intrepid, while Aurora 7 was recovered by John R. Pierce.

==== Postflight ====
Postflight analysis described the PHS malfunction as "mission critical" but noted that the pilot "adequately compensated" for "this anomaly ... in subsequent inflight procedures," confirming that backup systems—human pilots—could succeed when automatic systems fail. Organizational tensions between the astronaut office and the flight controller office and simmering resentment among the latter of the astronauts' hero status—account for much of the criticism of Carpenter's performance during his flight.

NASA's 1989 official history of Project Mercury says that until the third pass over Hawaii, Christopher C. Kraft Jr. (who directed the flight from Cape Canaveral) "considered this mission the most successful to date; everything had gone perfectly except for some overexpenditure of hydrogen peroxide fuel". However, then problems occurred. Kraft wrote in his 2001 memoir: "He was completely ignoring our request to check his instruments... I swore an oath that Scott Carpenter would never again fly in space." Kraft went so far as to name the chapter of his memoirs dealing with Carpenter's flight "The Man Malfunctioned".

Yet during Project Mercury, fuel consumption and other aspects of the vehicle operation were as much if not more the responsibility of the ground controllers. Gene Kranz, assistant flight director at the time, acknowledged that and placed some of the blame on the shoulders of ground control: "A crewman distracted and behind in the flight plan is a danger to the mission and himself. ... The ground had waited too long in addressing the fuel status and should have been more forceful in getting on with the checklists."

In a 2001 letter to The New York Times written in response to a review of Kraft's memoir, Carpenter wrote:

the system failures I encountered during the flight would have resulted in loss of the capsule and total mission failure had a man not been aboard. My postflight debriefings and reports led, in turn, to important changes in capsule design and future flight plans.

"One might argue," wrote Tom Wolfe, "that Carpenter had mishandled the reentry, but to accuse him of panic made no sense in light of the telemetered data concerning his heart rate and his respiratory rate." Schirra would later experience problems with the override button on the subsequent Mercury-Atlas 8 flight. Some memoirs, such as that of Gene Cernan, revived the controversy over who or what, exactly, was to blame for the overshoot, suggesting, for example, that Carpenter was distracted by the science and engineering experiments dictated by the flight plan and by the well-reported fireflies phenomenon:

Scott was the only multi-engine pilot among the elite cadre of veteran jet pilots, and it was whispered that he didn't volunteer for the space program, his dynamic and attractive wife did. Scott was just glad to be around, and was physically fit to an amazing degree. But he screwed up his own Mercury flight by joyriding, not paying enough attention to the job, missing his retrofire cue and splashing down several hundred miles from the target area. It became pretty obvious that Scott would never fly in space again.

== Ocean research ==
In 1963, Carpenter met Jacques Cousteau, who was giving a public lecture at the Massachusetts Institute of Technology. When Carpenter expressed interest in underwater research, Cousteau suggested that he consider the U.S. Navy's SEALAB project. Carpenter sought out Captain George F. Bond from SEALAB, and obtained permission from NASA to take a leave of absence to join the project. In July 1964, he went as part of the SEALAB team to Bermuda, where they held training exercises at Plantagenet Bank in 200 feet (61 m) of water. While in Bermuda, Carpenter sustained an injury from a motorcycle accident when he crashed into a coral wall, leaving him with a compound fracture in his right arm and damage to his left knee.

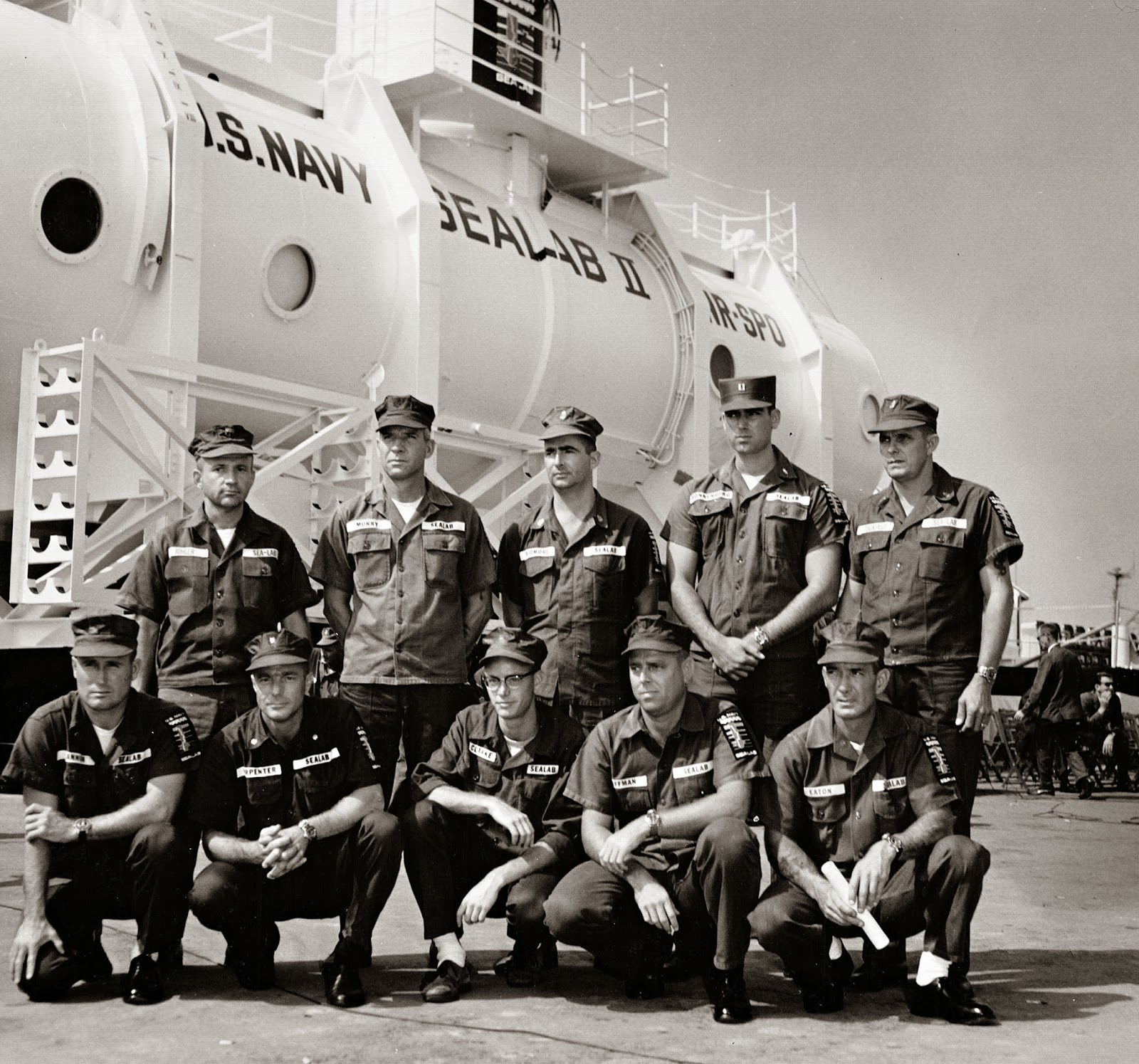
The first of three SEALAB II teams. Carpenter is second from left in the front row.

In August and September 1965, Carpenter spent 28 days living on the ocean floor in SEALAB II at a depth of 205 feet (62 m) about 3,000 feet (910 m) off the coast of California. The depth required a cabin gas mixture of 85% helium, 11% nitrogen and 4% oxygen. He suffered another injury when his right index finger was wounded by the toxic spines of a scorpion fish. SEALAB II coincided with Cooper's Gemini 5 mission, and Cooper and Carpenter held the first conversation between a craft in outer space and one on the ocean floor.

Carpenter returned to NASA as Executive Assistant to the Director of the Manned Spacecraft Center. He spent the last part of his NASA career developing underwater training to help astronauts with future spacewalks. He resigned from NASA on August 3, 1967, and joined the Navy's Deep Submergence Systems Project based in Bethesda, Maryland, as a Director of Aquanaut Operations for SEALAB III. In the aftermath of aquanaut Berry L. Cannon's death while attempting to repair a leak in SEALAB III, he volunteered to dive down to SEALAB and help return it to the surface, but SEALAB was ultimately salvaged in a less hazardous manner.

After failing to regain mobility in his arm that had been damaged in the motorcycle accident despite surgical interventions in 1964 and 1967, and diagnosed with avascular necrosis in the knees from deep-sea diving, Carpenter was ruled ineligible for further spaceflight and deep-sea missions. He retired from the Navy in 1969 with the rank of commander, after which he founded Sea Sciences, Inc., a corporation for developing programs for using ocean resources and improving environmental health.

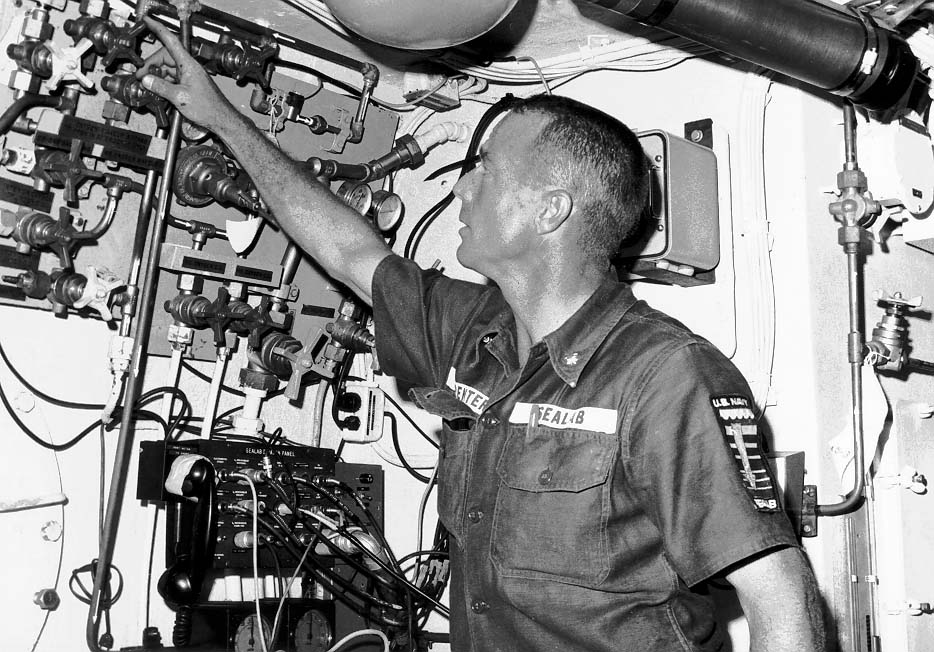
Carpenter in SEALAB II

After retiring from the Navy, Carpenter became a consultant to sport and diving manufacturers, and to the film industry, on space flight and oceanography. He gave talks and appeared in television documentaries on these subjects. He was involved in projects related to biological pest control and waste disposal, and for the production of energy from industrial and agricultural wastes. Together with the other Mercury Seven astronauts, he established the Astronaut Scholarship Foundation for science and engineering students.

Carpenter appeared in television commercials for brands such as Oldsmobile, Standard Oil of California, Nintendo, and Atari. He wrote a pair of technothrillers, The Steel Albatross (1991) and Deep Flight (1994), and in 2003 he published his autobiography, For Spacious Skies: The Uncommon Journey of a Mercury Astronaut, which was co-written with his daughter, Kristen Stoever. On Veterans Day in 2008, he joined President George W. Bush and fellow astronaut Buzz Aldrin in a ceremony aboard the Intrepid, the ship whose helicopter had recovered him after his Aurora 7 spaceflight having since become a museum. In 2012, he joined Glenn and former NASA support staff to celebrate the 50th anniversary of Glenn's mission.

== Personal life ==
Carpenter was married four times, divorced three times, and had a total of eight children by three wives, seven of whom survived to adulthood. He married his first wife, Rene, in September 1948. They had five children: Marc Scott, Kristen Elaine, Candace Noxon, Robyn Jay, and Timothy Kit, who died in infancy. By 1968, Carpenter and his wife had separated, with him living in California and Rene with their children in Washington, D.C. The Carpenters divorced in 1972.

In 1972, Carpenter married his second wife, Maria Roach, the daughter of film producer Hal Roach. Together, they had two children: Matthew Scott and Nicholas Andre, who would later become a filmmaker. He married his third wife, Barbara Curtin, in 1988. They had a son, Zachary Scott, when Carpenter was in his 60s. The marriage ended in divorce a few years later. In 1999, when he was 74, Carpenter married his fourth wife, Patricia Barrett. They resided in Vail, Colorado.

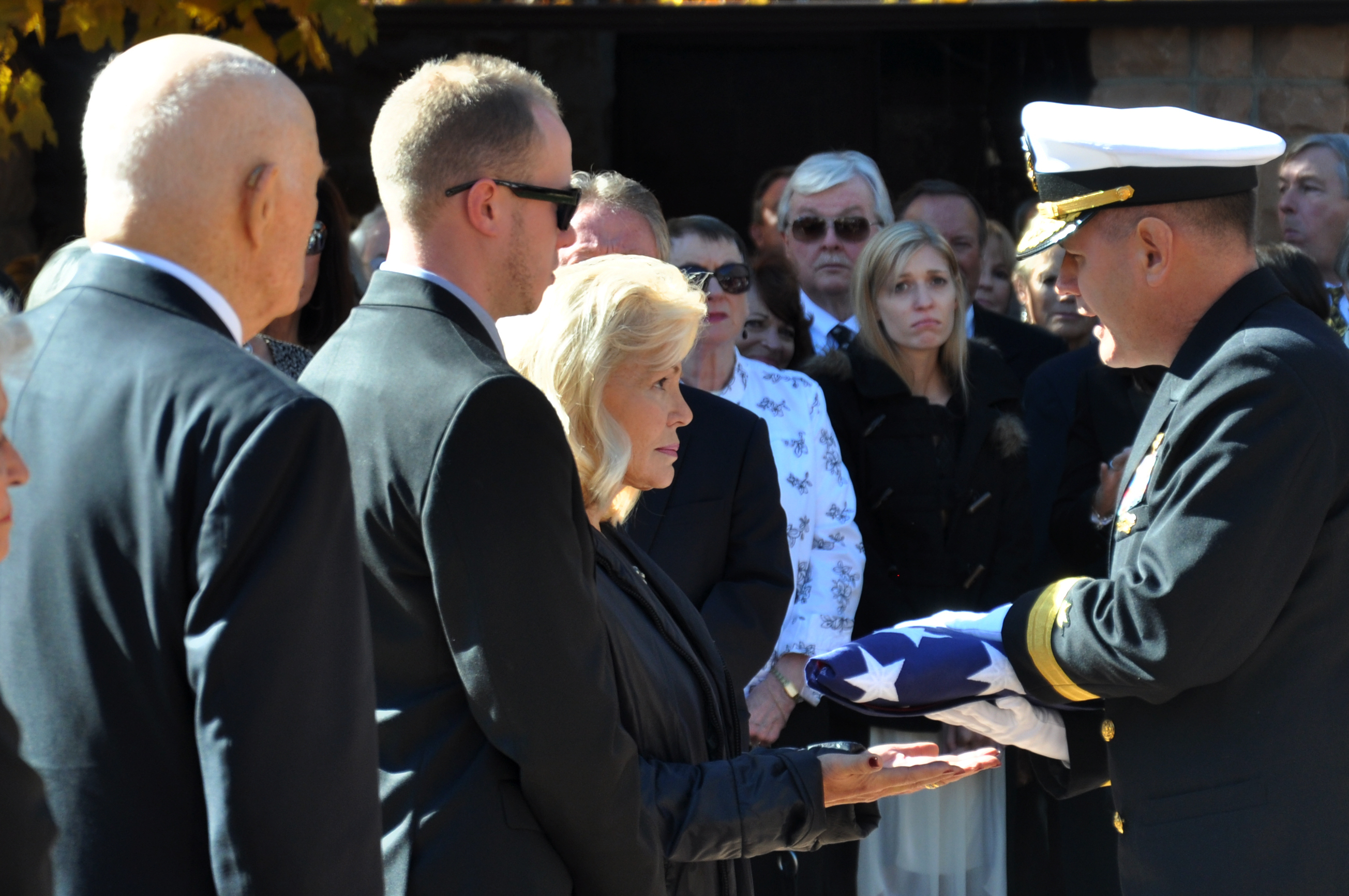
Patricia Carpenter receives the American flag at Carpenter's funeral, as John Glenn (left) looks on.

In September 2013, Carpenter suffered a stroke and was hospitalized at the Swedish Medical Center in Denver. He was then admitted to the Denver Hospice Inpatient Care Center. He died on October 10, 2013, at age 88. He was survived by his wife, four sons and two daughters, a granddaughter, and five step-grandchildren.

The Governor of Colorado, John Hickenlooper, ordered flags to be flown at half-mast. A public memorial service was held at St. John's Episcopal Church in Boulder, which was attended by fellow astronauts John Glenn, Gene Cernan, Charles Duke, Rusty Schweickart, Jack Schmitt, David Scott, Charles Bolden, Dan Brandenstein, Bob Crippen, Bruce McCandless II, Dick Truly and Charles D. Walker. His remains were cremated and the ashes buried on the family's ranch near Steamboat Springs, Colorado.

When asked in 2012 what his legacy would be, Carpenter replied: "I was an astronaut and an aquanaut."

== Awards and honors ==
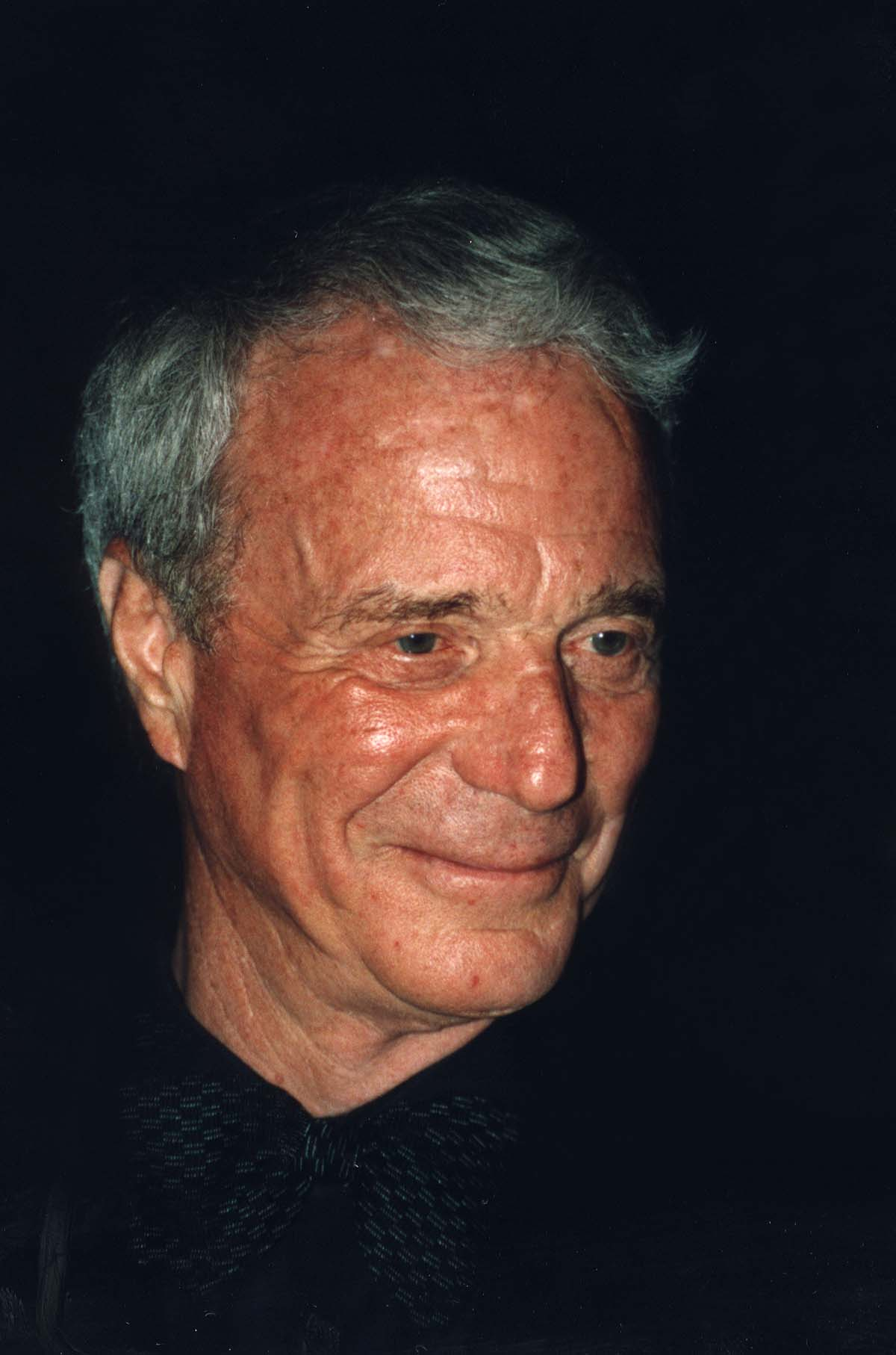
Scott Carpenter in 1999

=== U.S. Government awards ===
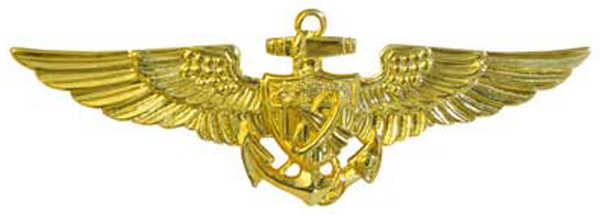

Navy Astronaut Wings
Legion of Merit	Distinguished Flying Cross	NASA Distinguished Service Medal
Navy Unit Commendation	American Campaign Medal	World War II Victory Medal
China Service Medal	National Defense Service Medal with bronze star	Korean Service Medal with two battle stars
Republic of Korea Presidential Unit Citation	United Nations Korea Medal	Korean War Service Medal

=== Civilian awards ===
- University of Colorado Recognition Medal
- Collier Trophy
- New York City Gold Medal of Honor
- Elisha Kent Kane Medal
- Silver Buffalo Award, Boy Scouts of America

=== Honors ===
In 1962, Boulder community leaders dedicated Scott Carpenter Park and Pool in his honor. The park features a 25-foot tall climbable metal rocket spaceship. The now-closed Aurora 7 Elementary School, also in Boulder, was named for Carpenter's spacecraft. Scott Carpenter Middle School in Westminster, Colorado, was named in his honor, as was M. Scott Carpenter Elementary School in Old Bridge, New Jersey. The Scott Carpenter Space Analog Station was placed on the ocean floor in 1997 and 1998. It was named in honor of his SEALAB work in the 1960s.

Carpenter was inducted into the International Air & Space Hall of Fame in 2008, the International Space Hall of Fame in 1981, and the National Aviation Hall of Fame in 2017. Along with the rest of the Mercury Seven astronauts, he was named to the U.S. Astronaut Hall of Fame in 1990.

== In popular culture ==
Speaking from the blockhouse at the launch of Friendship 7, Carpenter said "Godspeed, John Glenn" as Glenn's vehicle rose off the launch pad to begin the first U.S. orbital mission on February 20, 1962. The quote was included in the voiceovers of the teaser trailer for the 2009 Star Trek film. The audio phrase is also used in Kenny G's "Auld Lang Syne" (The Millennium Mix).

Scott Tracy in the Thunderbirds television series was named after Carpenter. In the 1983 film The Right Stuff, Carpenter is played by Charles Frank. Although his appearance is relatively minor, the film plays up Carpenter's friendship with Glenn (as played by Ed Harris). This film is based on the 1979 book by Tom Wolfe. In the 2015 ABC TV series The Astronaut Wives Club, Carpenter is portrayed by Wilson Bethel, and Rene Carpenter by Yvonne Strahovski. In the 2020 Disney+ miniseries The Right Stuff, Carpenter is played by James Lafferty.

== Books ==
- We Seven: By the Astronauts Themselves, ISBN 978-1439181034 co-written with Gordon Cooper, John Glenn, Gus Grissom, Wally Schirra, Alan Shepard and Deke Slayton.
- For Spacious Skies: The Uncommon Journey of a Mercury Astronaut, ISBN 0-15-100467-6 or the revised paperback edition ISBN 0-451-21105-7, Carpenter's biography, co-written with his daughter Kristen Stoever; describes his childhood, his experiences as a naval aviator, a Mercury astronaut, including an account of what went wrong, and right, on the flight of Aurora 7.
- The Steel Albatross, ISBN 978-0831776084. Science fiction. A technothriller set around the life of a fighter pilot in the US Navy's Top Gun school.
- Deep Flight, ISBN 978-0671759032. Science fiction. Follow-on to The Steel Albatross.
