= The Red Leather Diary =

Book by Lily Koppel

The Red Leather Diary: Reclaiming a Life Through the Pages of a Lost Journal
- Author: Lily Koppel
- Language: English
- Genre: Non-fiction
- Publication date: 2008
- Publication place: United States
- ISBN: 978-0-06-125677-6

The Red Leather Diary: Reclaiming a Life Through the Pages of a Lost Journal is a non-fiction book by Lily Koppel about a discarded 75-year-old diary, rescued from a dumpster, based on Koppel's 2006 New York Times City section cover story. The diary was kept from 1929 to 1934 by a young Manhattanite with literary and artistic aspirations. With the help of a private investigator, Koppel found the diarist, 90-year-old Florence Wolfson Howitt.

In October 2003, Koppel found the diary in a steamer trunk that had been unloaded from the basement of her apartment building at 98 Riverside Drive. The name Florence Wolfson was written inside the diary. Kopel recruited lawyer and private detective Charles Eric Gordon to try to track down the diary's owner, which he managed to do. Koppel detailed her discovery in her New York Times piece published on July 16, 2006.

Florence Wolfson was born on August 11, 1915, in Manhattan. Her parents, Daniel and Rebecca Wolfson, were Russian Jewish immigrants. Daniel was a doctor and Rebecca was the proprietor of a couture shop on Madison Avenue. She had a younger brother, Irving, born in 1919. She grew up in Harlem and the Upper East Side. In 1928, she met her future husband, Nathan Howitt, whose family owned a hotel in the Catskills where the Wolfsons spent their summers. She attended Wadleigh High School, graduating at age 15. As a teenager, she met and became infatuated with famous stage actress Eva Le Gallienne. She attended Hunter College, where she was editor-in-chief of the school's literary magazine, Echo. She went to Columbia University as a graduate student, studying English. While there, she hosted literary salons, where one of the guests was Delmore Schwartz. She and Howitt married in 1939 and had two daughters. The family lived at the Riverside Drive apartment where Koppel lived many years later. She and Howitt had houses in Westport, Connecticut, and Pompano Beach, Florida.

== Sources ==
- Kopppel, Lily, The Red Leather Diary, New York, 2008. ISBN 978-0-06-125677-6.
- Koppel, Lily. "Speak, Memory." The New York Times. July 16, 2006.
