= Air Intelligence Officer =

Professional position in an Air Force or in the field of air traffic control

An Air Intelligence Officer is an employee of an Air Force, air traffic control, or a commercial airline, responsible for gathering a variety of information and data, including threat and security analysis, aircraft technical specifications, safety violations, and other focus areas.

== Commercial sector ==
In the commercial aviation sector, professionals responsible for analyzing and managing security threats are often referred to as Aviation Security Analysts or Threat Assessment Officers. Their primary role is to ensure the safety and security of airline operations by identifying, evaluating, and mitigating potential risks. Air Intelligence Officers working for commercial airlines play a crucial role in ensuring the security, safety, and operational efficiency of flights. While they do not engage in military intelligence, their work involves monitoring and analyzing threats related to aviation security, airspace management, and geopolitical risks that could impact airline operations. These professionals typically focus on threat assessment and risk management, analyzing factors such as terrorism threats, geopolitical instability, cyber threats, and weather-related risks. They work closely with government agencies, aviation authorities, and private security firms to assess potential dangers to airline routes and infrastructure.

== Russia ==
In Russia, Air Intelligence Officers serve within the Russian Aerospace Forces (VKS) and other military intelligence agencies, such as the Main Directorate of the General Staff (GRU). Their primary role is to collect, analyze, and utilize intelligence related to air operations, enemy capabilities, and national security threats.

These officers are responsible for assessing aerial threats, including foreign air forces, missile systems, and electronic warfare operations. They use a variety of intelligence sources, such as satellite reconnaissance, signals intelligence (SIGINT), and electronic surveillance, to monitor adversary activities. Their duties also involve interpreting radar data, analyzing reconnaissance imagery, and providing intelligence briefings to command units.

In addition to operational intelligence, they may be involved in strategic planning, helping to shape Russia’s air defense and offensive capabilities. Their work is crucial for mission planning, air defense coordination, and counterintelligence efforts against foreign air surveillance. Given the secrecy surrounding Russian military operations, many details about the exact structure and activities of Air Intelligence Officers remain classified. However, their role is essential in maintaining Russia’s aerial and strategic military dominance.

== United Kingdom ==
Air Intelligence Officers in the United Kingdom serve primarily within the Royal Air Force (RAF) and associated defense and intelligence agencies within the Ministry of Defence. Their role is critical in gathering, analyzing, and disseminating intelligence related to air operations, enemy capabilities, and broader national security threats. These officers are responsible for assessing and interpreting intelligence to support air operations. They analyze tactical and strategic threats, including potential adversaries’ air forces, missile systems, and electronic warfare capabilities. Their work often involves the use of advanced technologies, including satellite imagery and signals intelligence (SIGINT), to collect and interpret vital information.

Air Intelligence Officers also play a key role in briefing and debriefing aircrew and military personnel, ensuring that missions are informed by the latest intelligence. They may provide real-time operational support, helping commanders make critical decisions during combat or reconnaissance missions. Their work requires precision, analytical thinking, and the ability to process complex information under pressure.

== United States ==
Air Intelligence Officers in the United States serve to collect information about air operations and assist in the direction of their execution for maximum effect. The evaluation of target damage is an essential task of the air intelligence officer, who is expected to use a variety of technologies to acquire, analyze, and assess information regarding the effects of air operations and the potential results of future operations. The air intelligence office typically serves as the G-2 officer (the staff officer responsible for intelligence) in a particular command staff, however such an officer may also serve as G-3 officer (operations and plans) where their role will be more focused on the direction of air operations than on the collection and analysis of intelligence.

From a 1978 report on the training of US Army air intelligence officers:

The Surveillance Systems Work Unit Area of the U.S. Army Research Inst for the Behavioral and Social Sciences has been analyzing the Army's aerial surveillance and reconnaissance (AS/R) system, particularly with respect to the G2 Air Officer position and image interpretation personnel. This present effort concentrated on developing resource management materials for the G2 Air Officer that could be used for on-the-job training and guidance in the performance of duties and in intelligence school courses. Resource management materials were compiled in the form of a handbook to achieve the training objectives. The first step involved gathering information on tasks as performed by operational AS/R units. Next, a content outline of the handbook was prepared by integrating the field interview data with the existing data base. Third, preparation of the handbook itself took into account the various training techniques and aids appropriate for on-the-job and school application. Step four consisted of conducting a limited evaluation of the handbook to determine its usefulness, acceptance, and final structure. Next, a 'preliminary' edition of the handbook used the information derived from the evaluation. Finally, an automated demonstration of a portion of the handbook illustrated how the materials could be used with possible future computerized information systems.

== See also ==
- Air Intelligence (Pakistan)
- Air Intelligence Group
- Air Intelligence of Russia
- RAF Intelligence
- People's Liberation Army Air Force
