= Lily Koppel =

American writer

- Born: 1981 (age 44–45); Chicago, Illinois, US
- Education: Barnard College
- Occupation: Author
- Writing career
- Genre: non-fiction
- Notable works: The Astronaut Wives Club: A True Story, The Red Leather Diary
- Website: www.astronautwivesclub.com

Lily Koppel (born 1981) is a writer living in New York City. She is known for her books The Red Leather Diary (2008) and The Astronaut Wives Club (2013).

== Career ==
Koppel writes for The New York Times and other publications. She graduated from Barnard College in 2003 with a degree in English Literature and creative writing. Koppel began contributing by reporting to The New York Times Boldface Names celebrity column in 2003.

She has appeared on The Today Show, Good Morning America and National Public Radio.

=== Books ===
Koppel's book The Red Leather Diary: Reclaiming a Life Through the Pages of a Lost Journal was published by HarperCollins on April 1, 2008. The book is about her discovery of a young woman's diary, kept in New York in the 1930s, and its return to Florence Wolfson Howitt, its owner, at age 90. The diary was recovered from a steamer trunk found in a dumpster outside of Koppel's apartment building on the Upper West Side of Manhattan. The non-fiction book is based on Koppel's New York Times City section cover story.

Her second book, The Astronaut Wives Club, was published by Grand Central Publishing on June 11, 2013. The book served as the basis for the ABC short-run TV series The Astronaut Wives Club, which premiered in June 2015.
