= The Astronaut Wives Club (book) =

2013 book by Lily Koppel

- Author: Lily Koppel
- Subject: Biography, History
- Published: 2013
- Pages: 271 pp.
- ISBN: 1-4555-0325-8
- OCLC: 816563627

The Astronaut Wives Club is a 2013 New York Times Bestselling book by the American author Lily Koppel based on the experiences of the Astronaut Wives Club, who were wives of US astronauts. It was first published on June 11, 2013, by the Hachette Book Group and provided the basis for the 2015 television series, The Astronaut Wives Club.

== Summary ==
The book centers on the personal lives of the wives of the Mercury Seven astronauts who piloted the six crewed space flights of Project Mercury between May 1961 and May 1963. The women were frequently the focus of public attention and also came into contact with influential people such as Jackie Kennedy. This rise to celebrity status would take its toll on these women and they ended up turning to each other for solace, calling themselves the Astronaut Wives Club. As a result, they formed the Astronaut Wives Club and met regularly to discuss their daily lives and issues that only the others would truly understand.

== Background ==
Some of the subject matter of the book was previously told in Tom Wolfe's classic 1979 novel The Right Stuff and the 1983 Oscar-winning movie based on it.

== Reception ==
The Washington Post praised the work commenting that its anecdotes "fill this breezy and entertaining book, which—like the women themselves—takes pleasure in both playing up and defying the stereotypes of the time". Dallas News also praised the work, saying, "Koppel has done an impressive job of research and writing."
