= Mercury Seven =

1959 human spaceflight selection of 7 candidates

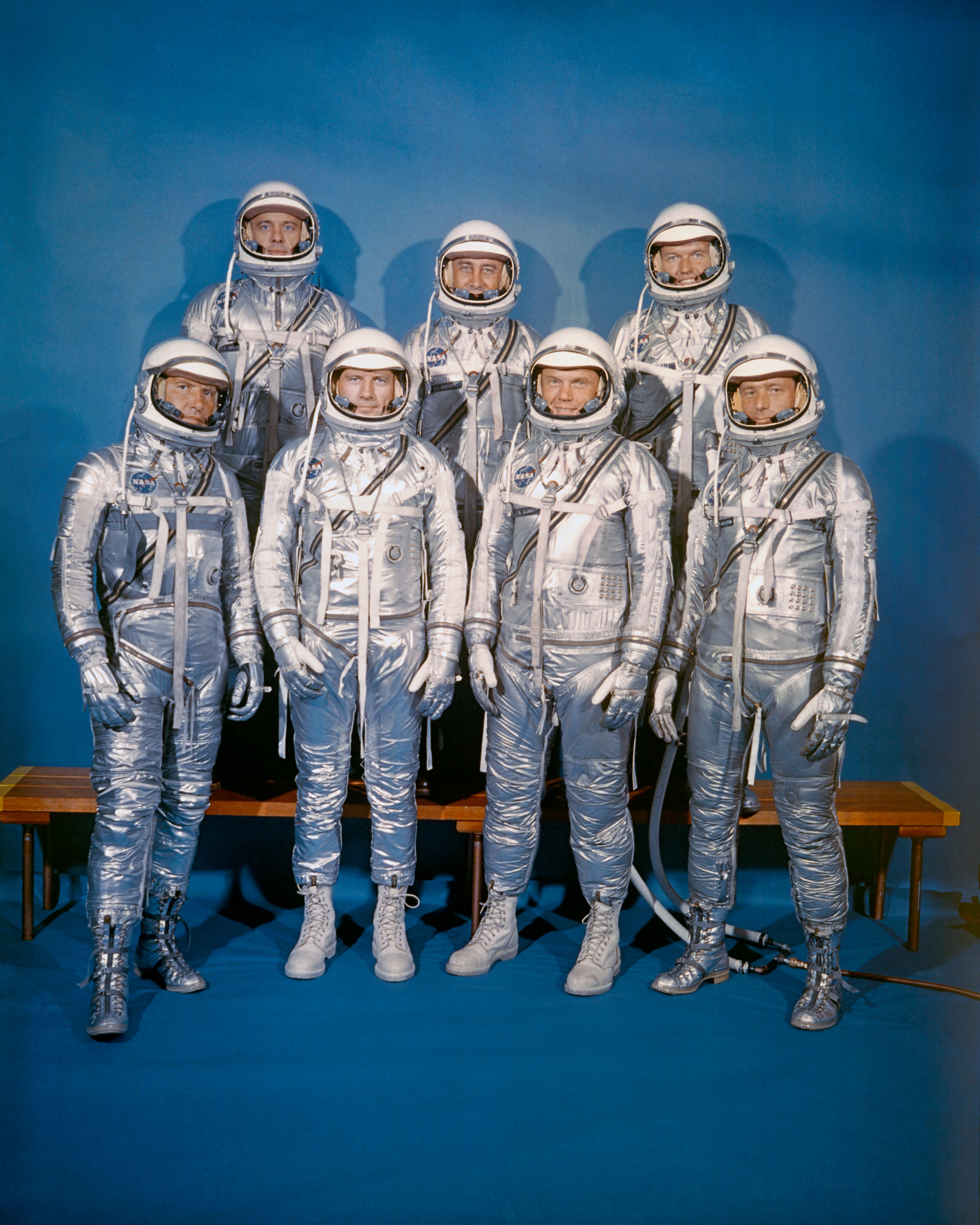
- The Mercury Seven in 1960; Back: Alan Shepard, Gus Grissom, Gordon Cooper; Front: Wally Schirra, Deke Slayton, John Glenn, Scott Carpenter (Note: Due to manufacturing constraints, Slayton and Glenn wore work boots spray-painted silver for the promotional photo.)
- Year selected: 1959
- Number selected: 7

The Mercury Seven were the group of seven astronauts selected to fly spacecraft for Project Mercury. They are also referred to as the "Original Seven" and Astronaut Group 1. Their names were publicly announced by NASA on April 9, 1959: M. Scott Carpenter, L. Gordon Cooper, John H. Glenn, Jr., Virgil I. Grissom, Walter M. Schirra, Jr., Alan B. Shepard, Jr., and Donald K. Slayton. The Mercury Seven created a new profession in the United States, and established the image of the American astronaut for decades to come.

All of the Mercury Seven eventually flew in space. They piloted the six spaceflights of the Mercury program that had an astronaut on board from May 1961 to May 1963, and members of the group flew on all of the NASA human spaceflight programs of the 20th century – Mercury, Gemini, Apollo, and the Space Shuttle.

Shepard became the first American to enter space in 1961, and walked on the Moon on Apollo 14 in 1971. Grissom flew the first crewed Gemini mission in 1965, but died in 1967 in the Apollo 1 fire; the others all survived past retirement from service. Schirra flew Apollo 7 in 1968, the first crewed Apollo mission, in Grissom's place, and became the only astronaut to fly Mercury, Gemini and Apollo missions. Cooper piloted the last Mercury spaceflight, Mercury-Atlas 9, in 1963, and in 1965 became the first astronaut to make a second orbital flight when he flew as command pilot of Gemini 5. Carpenter flew Mercury-Atlas 7 in 1962. He later took leave of absence to join the U.S. Navy SEALAB project as an aquanaut, but in training suffered injuries that made him unavailable for further spaceflights.

Slayton, grounded with an atrial fibrillation, ultimately flew on the Apollo–Soyuz Test Project in 1975. The first American in orbit in 1962, Glenn flew on the Space Shuttle Discovery in 1998 to become, at age 77, the oldest person to fly in space at the time. He was the oldest member of the Mercury Seven, and the last living member of the group when he died in 2016 at age 95.

== Background ==
The launch of the Sputnik 1 satellite by the Soviet Union on October 4, 1957, started a Cold War technological and ideological competition with the United States known as the Space Race. The demonstration of American technological inferiority came as a profound shock to the American public. The Soviets followed up with Sputnik 2, which carried Laika, a Soviet space dog. American intelligence analysts assessed that the Soviets planned to put a man into orbit, which caused the United States Air Force (USAF) and the National Advisory Committee for Aeronautics (NACA) to strengthen their efforts to achieve that goal.

The USAF launched a spaceflight project called Man in Space Soonest (MISS), for which it obtained approval from the Joint Chiefs of Staff, and requested $133 million in funding. MISS encountered technical challenges, which in turn caused funding difficulties. This generated conflict with the two agencies that should have been supporting it, NACA and the Advanced Research Projects Agency (ARPA). The core of the problem was the USAF's inability to articulate a clear military purpose for MISS.

Meanwhile, in response to the Sputnik crisis, the President of the United States, Dwight D. Eisenhower, decided to create a new civilian agency, the National Aeronautics and Space Administration (NASA), which would absorb NACA and be responsible for the overall direction of the American space program. In September 1958, the USAF agreed to transfer responsibility for MISS to NASA, which was established on October 1, 1958. On November 5, the Space Task Group (STG) was established at the NASA Langley Research Center in Hampton, Virginia, with Robert R. Gilruth as its director. On November 26, 1958, NASA Administrator T. Keith Glennan and his deputy, Hugh Dryden, adopted a suggestion by Abe Silverstein, the director of Space Flight Development at STG, that the human spaceflight project be called Project Mercury. The name was publicly announced by Glennan on December 17, 1958, the 55th anniversary of the Wright Brothers' first flight. The objective of Project Mercury was to launch a man into Earth orbit, return him safely to the Earth, and evaluate his capabilities in space.

== Selection criteria ==
The STG had to decide on a name for the people who would fly into space. A brainstorming session was held on December 1, 1958. By analogy with "aeronaut" (air traveler), someone came up with the term "astronaut", which meant "star traveler", although Project Mercury's ambitions were far more limited. They thought that they had coined a new word, but the term had been used in science fiction since the 1920s. A three-man panel consisting of Charles J. Donlan, Warren J. North and Allen O. Gamble drew up a civil service job specification for astronauts. The panel proposed that astronauts be in civil service grades 12 to 15, depending on qualifications and experience, with an annual salary of $8,330 to $12,770 (equivalent to $92,001 to $141,039 in 2025). It described the duties of an astronaut:

Although the entire satellite operation will be possible, in the early phases, without the presence of man, the astronaut will play an important role during the flight. He will contribute by monitoring the cabin environment and by making necessary adjustments. He will have continuous displays of his position and attitude and other instrument readings, and will have the capability of operating the reaction controls, and of initiating the descent from orbit. He will contribute to the operation of the communications system. In addition, the astronaut will make research observations that cannot be made by instruments; these include physiological, astronomical and meteorological observations.

Although the panel considered that many people might possess the required skills – aircraft pilots, submariners, deep sea divers and mountain climbers were all considered likely prospects – it decided that they could be best met by military test pilots. Accepting only military test pilots would simplify the selection process, and would also satisfy security requirements, as the role would almost certainly involve the handling of classified information. The decision to restrict selection to military test pilots was taken by Glennan, Dryden and Gilruth in the last week of December 1958, but the irony of using military test pilots in a civilian program was not overlooked, and in view of the President's express preference for a space program outside the military, Glennan thought it best to run the decision past Eisenhower. A meeting was arranged with the President, who was convinced by the arguments.

The panel also drew up selection criteria. Astronauts had to be:

1. Less than 40 years old;
2. Less than 5 feet 11 inches (1.80 m) tall;
3. In excellent physical condition;
4. With a bachelor's degree or equivalent;
5. A graduate of test pilot school;
6. With a minimum of 1,500 hours total flying time; and
7. A qualified jet pilot.

The height limit was a function of the design of the Mercury spacecraft, which could not accommodate someone taller. It was still uncertain as to whether piloting in the conventional sense would ever be possible in a spacecraft, but from the beginning the spacecraft design provided for some degree of manual control.

== Selection process ==
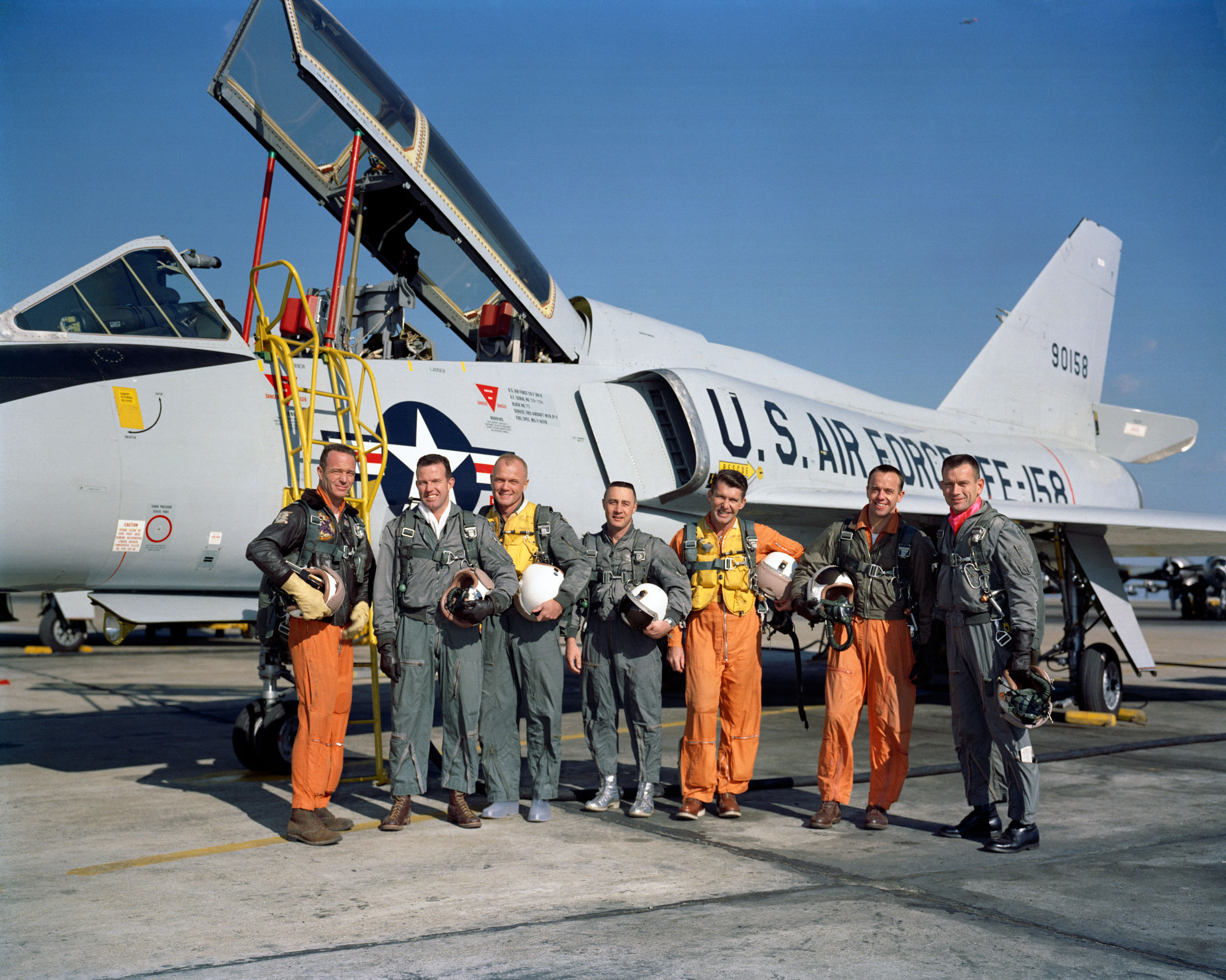
The Mercury Seven in front of an F-106 Delta Dart

The first step in the selection process was to obtain the service records of test pilot school graduates from the United States Department of Defense. All services agreed to cooperate fully, and handed over their records. There were 508 military test pilots in total, of whom 225 were Air Force, 225 Navy, 23 Marine Corps and 35 Army. Donlan, North, Gamble and psychologist Robert B. Voas then went through the records in January 1959, and identified 110 pilots – five Marines, 47 from the Navy, and 58 from the Air Force – who met the rest of the minimum standards. The 110 were then split into three groups, with the most promising in the first group.

Sixty-nine candidates were brought to the Pentagon in Washington, DC, in two groups. The first group of 35 assembled there on February 2, 1959. The Navy and Marine Corps officers were welcomed by the Chief of Naval Operations, Admiral Arleigh Burke, while the Air Force officers were addressed by the Chief of Staff of the United States Air Force, General Thomas D. White. Both pledged their support to the space program, and promised that the careers of volunteers would not be adversely affected. NASA officials then briefed the candidates on Project Mercury. The officials conceded that it would be a hazardous undertaking, but emphasized that it was of great national importance.

The candidates were given three briefings by NASA officials. The first was about NASA and Project Mercury; the second concerned the role of the pilot in the project; and the third was about the proposed astronaut training syllabus. In the afternoon candidates had short individual meetings with the NASA selection committee. It was emphasized that participation was entirely voluntary, that candidates were free to decline, and that there would be no career repercussions if they did so. Several candidates declined at this point.

The rest reported to NASA Headquarters in Washington, DC, the following day for further screening. Voas gave them a series of standardized tests: the Miller Analogies Test to measure IQ; the Minnesota Engineering Analogies Test to measure engineering aptitude; and the Doppelt Mathematical Reasoning Test to measure mathematical aptitude. Donlan, North and Gamble conducted interviews in which they asked technical questions, and queried candidates about their motivations for applying to the program. Candidates were evaluated by two USAF psychiatrists, George E. Ruff and Edwin Z. Levy. A USAF flight surgeon, William S. Augerson, went over the candidates' medical records. Some were found to be over the height limit, and were eliminated at this juncture.

The process was repeated with a second group of 34 candidates a week later. Of the 69, six were found to be over the height limit, 15 were eliminated for other reasons, and 16 declined. This left NASA with 32 candidates: 15 from the Navy, 15 from the Air Force and two from the Marine Corps. Since this was more than expected, NASA decided not to bother with the remaining 41 candidates, as 32 candidates seemed a more than adequate number from which to select 12 astronauts as planned. The degree of interest also indicated that far fewer would drop out during training than anticipated, which would result in training astronauts who would not be required to fly Project Mercury missions. It was therefore decided to cut the number of astronauts selected to just six.

Then came a grueling series of physical and psychological tests at the Lovelace Clinic and the Wright Aerospace Medical Laboratory from January to March, under the direction of Albert H. Schwichtenberg, a retired USAF brigadier general. The tests included spending hours on treadmills and tilt tables, submerging their feet in ice water, three doses of castor oil, and five enemas. Only one candidate, Jim Lovell, was eliminated on medical grounds at this stage, a diagnosis that was later found to be in error; thirteen others were recommended with reservations. Gilruth found himself unable to select only six from the remaining eighteen, and ultimately seven were chosen.

Despite their rejection from the first group of astronauts, many of the 25 finalists who were passed over still had successful military careers. Three eventually became astronauts: Pete Conrad and Jim Lovell, who were selected with the next group in 1962; and Edward Givens, who was selected with the fifth group in 1966. Others achieved high rank: Lawrence Heyworth Jr. became a rear admiral, Robert B. Baldwin and William P. Lawrence became vice admirals, and Thomas B. Hayward became an admiral. He commanded the Seventh Fleet and the Pacific Fleet, and was Chief of Naval Operations. Three of the finalists later died in aircraft accidents: Halvor M. Ekeren, Jr., on April 8, 1959; Jack B. Mayo on January 11, 1961; and Hal R. Crandall on July 24, 1963. Finalist Robert G. Bell died in the May 16, 1965, explosion of multiple aircraft at Bien Hoa Air Base, Vietnam.

== Eligibility ==
The seven original American astronauts were Navy Lieutenant Scott Carpenter, Air Force Captain Gordon Cooper, Marine Lieutenant Colonel John Glenn, Air Force Captain Gus Grissom, Navy Lieutenant Commander Wally Schirra, Navy Lieutenant Commander Alan Shepard, and Air Force Captain Deke Slayton.

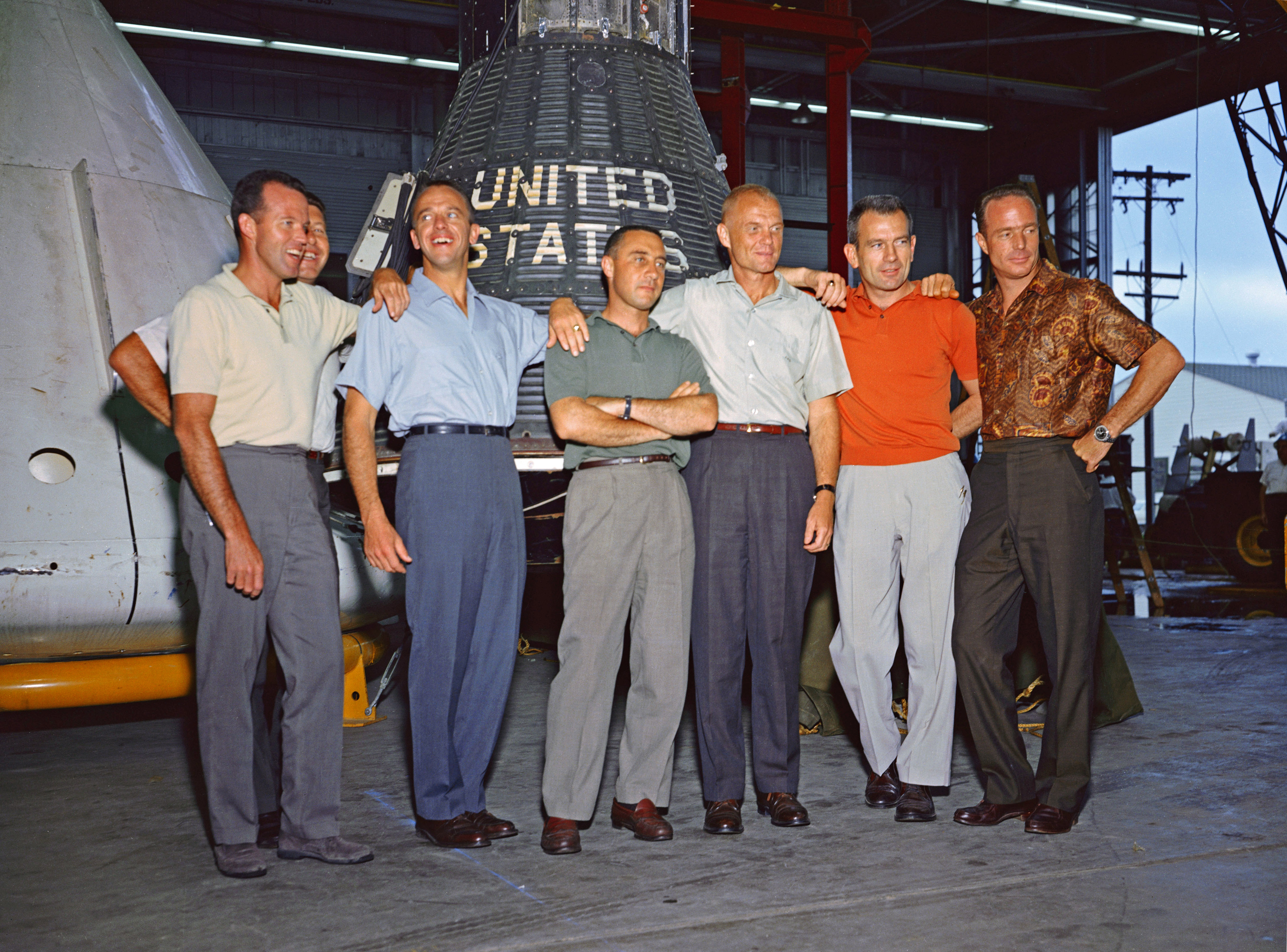
(L to R) Cooper, Schirra (partially obscured), Shepard, Grissom, Glenn, Slayton, and Carpenter

All were male and white. Women were not yet accepted into the military test pilot schools, and the first African American to graduate from the USAF Experimental Test Pilot School, John L. Whitehead Jr., did so only in January 1958, and was not one of the finalists. Yet the Mercury Seven were similar beyond what was a simple result of the selection criteria. Four were their fathers' namesakes. All were the eldest or only sons in their families. All were born in the United States, and were raised in small towns. All were married with children, and all were Protestants.

Their ages at the time of selection ranged from 32 (Cooper) to 37 (Glenn). Shepard was the tallest, at the maximum height of 5 feet 11 inches (1.80 m); Grissom, the shortest at 5 feet 7 inches (1.70 m). Weight was not a firm criterion like height, as losing weight was always possible, but the Mercury spacecraft set a limit of 180 pounds (82 kg). Cooper was the lightest, at 150 pounds (68 kg), while Glenn was at the maximum weight of 180 pounds (82 kg), and Schirra was slightly overweight at 185 pounds (84 kg), and had to lose weight to be accepted. Both had to watch their weight carefully while they were in the space program. IQs ranged from 135 to 147.

All seven had attended post-secondary institutions in the 1940s. Of the five astronauts who had completed undergraduate degrees before being selected, two (Shepard and Schirra) were graduates of the United States Naval Academy at Annapolis, Maryland, in 1944 and 1945, respectively. Following a decade of intermittent studies, Cooper completed his bachelor's degree in aerospace engineering at the Air Force Institute of Technology (AFIT) in 1956. Grissom earned a bachelor's degree in mechanical engineering from Purdue University in 1950, and a second bachelor's degree, in aeromechanics, from the AFIT in 1956. Slayton graduated from the University of Minnesota with a bachelor's degree in aeronautical engineering in 1949. Average flying hours were 3,500, of which 1,700 was in jets. Most were fighter pilots except Carpenter, who flew multi-engine patrol planes for most of his career.

Glenn and Carpenter did not meet all of their schools' degree requirements; Glenn had not completed his senior year in residence or his final proficiency exam, and Carpenter had not finished his final course in heat transfer. Both were admitted on the basis of professional equivalency, and were ultimately awarded their bachelor's degrees after their 1962 space flights—Glenn in engineering from Muskingum College and Carpenter in aeronautical engineering from the University of Colorado at Boulder.

Despite the extensive physical examinations, Slayton had an undiagnosed atrial fibrillation, which resulted in his grounding two months prior to what would have been his first space flight, and the second orbital mission.

== NASA introduction ==
NASA introduced the astronauts in Washington, DC, on April 9, 1959. Although the agency viewed Project Mercury's purpose as an experiment to determine whether humans could survive space travel, the seven men immediately became national heroes and were compared by Time magazine to "Columbus, Magellan, Daniel Boone, and the Wright brothers." Two hundred reporters overflowed the room used for the announcement and alarmed the astronauts, who were unused to such a large audience.

Because they wore civilian clothes, the audience did not see them as military test pilots but "mature, middle-class Americans, average in height and visage, family men all." To the astronauts' surprise, the reporters asked questions about their personal lives instead of their war records or flight experience, or details about Project Mercury. After Glenn responded by speaking eloquently "on God, country, and family," the others followed his example, and were applauded by the reporters.

Test pilots accepted that their jobs were dangerous; during Glenn's three years serving as one for the Navy, 12 had died. When asked about how their families thought about their taking on such a dangerous job, most of the seven were surprised, as they had never considered this before. Glenn replied that he "didn't think that any of us could really go on with something like this if we didn't have pretty good backing at home. My wife's attitude towards this has been the same as it has been all along through my flying. If it is what I want to do, she is behind it, and the kids are too, one hundred percent." Carpenter received even more applause when he noted that he was at sea when NASA had phoned to inform him that he had been chosen, and his wife Rene had accepted on his behalf. His selection had also tested the Navy's commitment to Project Mercury when the skipper of his ship, the USS Hornet, refused to release him, and Burke had to personally intervene.

Cooper's wife Trudy had left him in January 1959 after he had an affair with another officer's wife, and had moved to San Diego. During the selection interviews, he had been asked about his domestic relationship, and had lied, saying that he and Trudy had a good, stable marriage. Aware that NASA wanted to project an image of its astronauts as loving family men, and that his story would not stand up to scrutiny, he drove down to San Diego to see Trudy at the first opportunity. Lured by the prospect of a great adventure for herself and her daughters, she agreed to go along with the charade and pretend that they were a happily married couple.

== Group members ==
Mercury Seven astronauts
Image	Name	Born	Died	Mission(s)	Career	Ref.
Portrait	Malcolm Scott Carpenter	Boulder, Colorado, May 1, 1925	October 10, 2013		Carpenter joined the U.S. Navy in 1949, and flew multi-engine Lockheed P-2 Neptune patrol aircraft. He graduated from the U.S. Naval Test Pilot School at NAS Patuxent River, Maryland, with Class 13 in 1954. Carpenter flew Mercury-Atlas 7, the second orbital Mercury mission. He took a leave of absence from NASA in the fall of 1963 to participate in the Navy's SEALAB program, and sustained an injury to his left arm in a motorbike accident. Two surgical interventions in 1964 and 1967 failed to correct the condition, and he resigned from NASA in August 1967, and retired from the Navy in 1969, with the rank of Commander.	
Portrait	Leroy Gordon (Gordo) Cooper Jr.	Shawnee, Oklahoma, March 6, 1927	October 4, 2004		Cooper joined the USAF in 1949, and flew F-84 Thunderjets and F-86 Sabres in Germany for four years. He graduated from the USAF Experimental Flight Test Pilot School at Edwards Air Force Base, California, with Class 56D in 1956. Cooper flew Mercury-Atlas 9, the final Mercury mission. He was the first American to fly in space for more than a day, and the last to fly in space alone. He flew in space again on Gemini 5 in August 1965. In 1969, he served as commander of the backup crew of Apollo 10. His lax attitude toward training and his personal safety put him at odds with Slayton. After Shepard was given his potential Apollo command, Cooper retired from NASA and the Air Force with the rank of Colonel in July 1970.	
Portrait	John Herschel Glenn Jr.	Cambridge, Ohio, July 18, 1921	December 8, 2016		Glenn joined the U.S. Navy in 1942, and transferred to the U.S. Marine Corps in 1943. He saw active service as a fighter pilot in the Pacific during World War II, in China and in the Korean War, when he shot down three MiG-15s. He qualified as a test pilot with Class 12 at the U.S. Naval Test Pilot School in 1954. In 1957, he made the first supersonic transcontinental flight across the United States. Glenn flew in space on Mercury-Atlas 6, the first orbital Mercury flight, and became the first American to orbit the Earth. He retired from NASA in 1964, and from the Marine Corps with the rank of Colonel in 1965. From 1974 to 1999, he served as a Democratic U.S. Senator from Ohio. While a U.S. Senator in 1998, he was chosen to fly as a civilian Payload Specialist on the October–November mission STS-95 of the Space Shuttle Discovery, and, at the age of 77, became the oldest person to orbit the Earth. He is the only member of the Mercury Seven to fly on the Space Shuttle.	
Portrait	Virgil Ivan (Gus) Grissom	Mitchell, Indiana, April 3, 1926	January 27, 1967		Grissom joined the USAF in 1950, and flew 100 combat missions in the Korean War as an F-86 Sabre pilot. He graduated from the USAF Experimental Flight Test Pilot School at Edwards Air Force Base, California, with Class 56D (the same class as Gordon Cooper) in 1956. Grissom flew in space on Mercury-Redstone 4, the second suborbital Mercury flight, and then as Command Pilot of Gemini 3, the first crewed Gemini mission in 1965, becoming the first NASA astronaut to fly in space twice. He was designated as commander of Apollo 1 but was killed in a fire during a launch pad rehearsal test. At the time of his death, he was a Lieutenant Colonel in the USAF.	
Portrait	Walter Marty (Wally) Schirra Jr.	Hackensack, New Jersey, March 12, 1923	May 3, 2007		Schirra graduated from the United States Naval Academy at Annapolis, Maryland, in 1945. After service afloat during World War II, he qualified as a pilot in 1948, and saw service on exchange with the USAF as a fighter pilot in the Korean War, flying 90 combat missions, and downing two MiGs. He qualified as a test pilot with Class 20 at the U.S. Naval Test Pilot School in 1958. Schirra flew in space on Mercury-Atlas 8, the third orbital Mercury flight; on Gemini 6A in 1965; and Apollo 7, the first crewed Apollo mission. Schirra was the first person to be launched into space three times, and the only one to fly Mercury, Gemini, and Apollo missions. He resigned from NASA and retired from the U.S. Navy with the rank of Captain in 1969, and joined CBS News as Walter Cronkite's co-anchor for the broadcasts of the Apollo Moon landing missions.	
Portrait	Alan Bartlett Shepard Jr.	Derry, New Hampshire, November 18, 1923	July 21, 1998		Shepard graduated from the United States Naval Academy at Annapolis, Maryland, in 1944. After service afloat during World War II, he qualified as a pilot in 1947, and as a test pilot at the U.S. Naval Test Pilot School in 1950. Shepard flew in space on Mercury-Redstone 3, the first piloted Mercury flight, and became the first American in space. He was slated to command the last Mercury flight, Mercury-Atlas 10, but it was canceled, and then the first Project Gemini flight, but he was grounded in 1963 after being diagnosed with Ménière's disease, a condition in which fluid pressure builds up in the inner ear, resulting in disorientation, dizziness, and nausea. He stayed with the space program, accepting the position of Chief of the Astronaut Office, until an experimental corrective surgery cured him, and he was returned to flight status in May 1969. In 1971, he commanded Apollo 14, the third crewed lunar landing mission, and became the fifth and oldest man to walk on the Moon. He was promoted to Rear Admiral, the first astronaut to reach this rank. He retired from NASA and the U.S. Navy in 1974.	
Portrait	Donald Kent (Deke) Slayton	Sparta, Wisconsin, March 1, 1924	June 13, 1993		Slayton joined the US Army Air Corps in 1942, and flew combat missions over Europe and the Pacific during World War II. He joined the Minnesota Air National Guard in 1951, and the USAF in 1952. He graduated from the USAF Test Pilot School at Edwards Air Force Base, California, with Class 55C, and served as a test pilot at the Flight Test Center. Before Slayton could make his Mercury flight, he was diagnosed with an erratic heart rhythm (idiopathic atrial fibrillation), and grounded by NASA and the Air Force. He resigned from the USAF in 1963 with the rank of Major, but stayed with the space program, first as unofficial Chief of the Astronaut Office, then as Director of Flight Crew Operations. In July 1970, he was returned to flight status, and flew on the last Apollo spacecraft in July 1975 as docking module pilot on the Apollo-Soyuz Test Project flight. He left NASA in 1982.	

== Influence ==
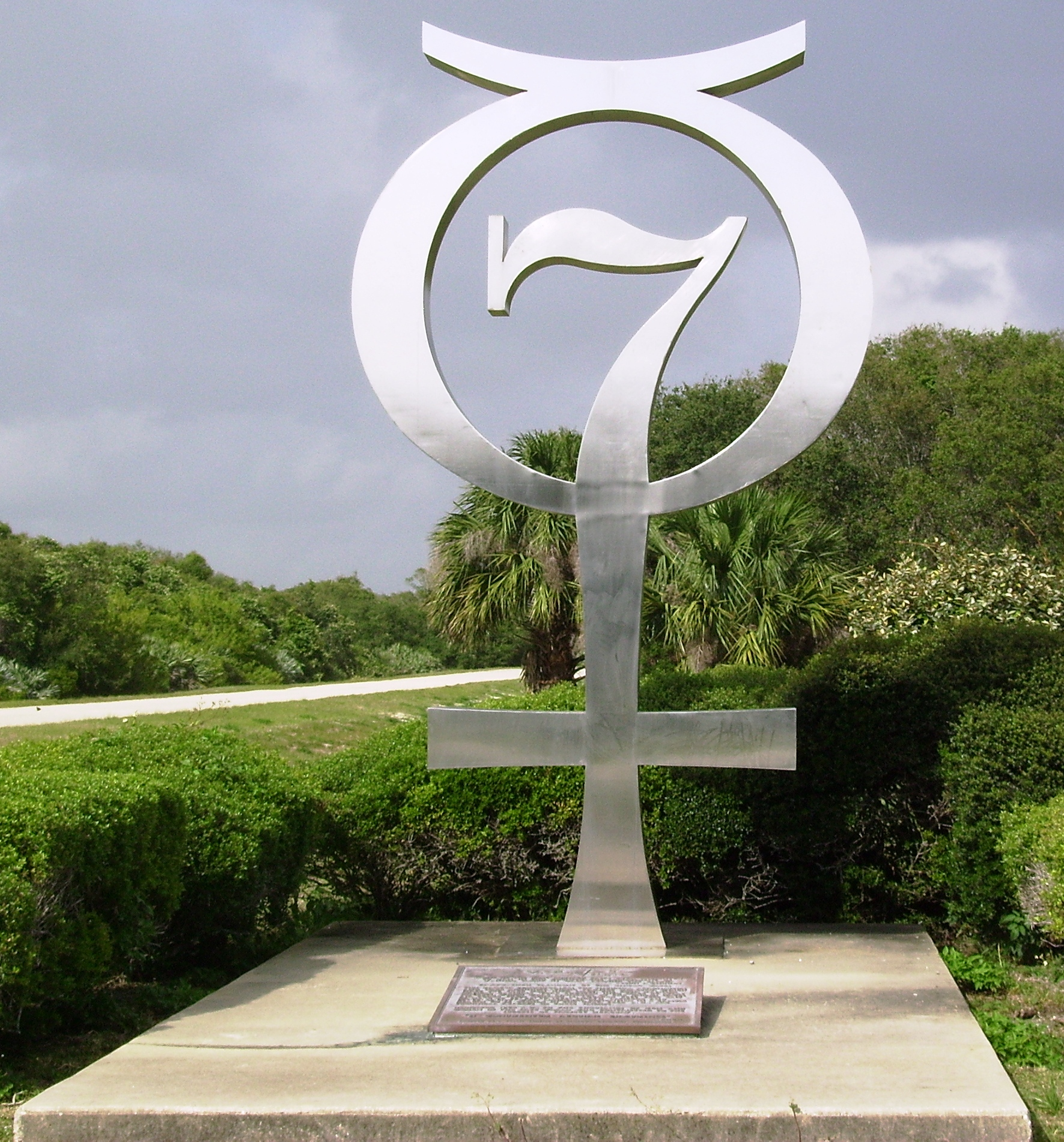
Memorial at Cape Canaveral Air Force Station Launch Complex 14

The Mercury spacecraft was less finished than the astronauts' previous vehicles. After watching an Atlas rocket explode during launch on May 18, 1959, they publicly joked "I'm glad they got that out of the way" – typical gallows humor that test pilots used to cope with danger – but privately calculated that one of the seven would die during Project Mercury. The astronauts participated in the project's design and planning, dividing the work between them. Carpenter had training in airborne electronics and celestial navigation, so he assumed responsibility for the spacecraft's communications and navigation systems. Grissom had a degree in mechanical engineering, so he became responsible for the attitude control systems. Glenn had experience flying many types of aircraft, so he oversaw the cockpit layout. Schirra drew responsibility for the life support systems and the pressure suits. Drawing on his experience as a Naval officer, Shepard looked after the tracking network and liaised with the Navy on recovery operations. Cooper and Slayton were Air Force officers with engineering backgrounds, so they dealt with the Redstone Arsenal and Convair, who built the Redstone and Atlas boosters used by Project Mercury. The astronauts affected the design of the Mercury spacecraft in significant ways, insisting that a window be installed, and pressing for a greater degree of astronaut autonomy in flying the spacecraft.

The astronauts remained on active duty as military officers, and were paid according to their rank. To supplement their travel, they were provided a $9 per diem (equivalent to $99 in 2025) for day trips, and a $12 per diem (equivalent to $133 in 2025) for overnight trips, which did not cover the cost of hotels and restaurant meals. As a result, astronauts avoided spending money while traveling, as they were personally responsible for costs over their allotted per diem. An important component of their income was monthly flight pay, which ranged from $190 to $245 (equivalent to $2,098 to $2,706 in 2025).

The astronauts traveled to frequent meetings around the country on commercial flights, which forced them to earn their flight pay on weekends. Grissom and Slayton regularly drove to Langley Air Force Base, and attempted to fly the required four hours a month, but had to compete for T-33 aircraft with colonels and generals. Cooper traveled to McGhee Tyson Air National Guard Base in Tennessee, where a friend let him fly higher-performance F-104B jets. This came up when Cooper had lunch with William Hines, a reporter for The Washington Star, and was duly reported in the paper. Cooper then discussed the issue with Congressman James G. Fulton. The matter was taken up by the House Committee on Science and Astronautics. Within weeks the astronauts were given priority access to USAF T-33s, F-102s and F-106s at Langley. In 1962, NASA acquired a fleet of T-38s for their use.

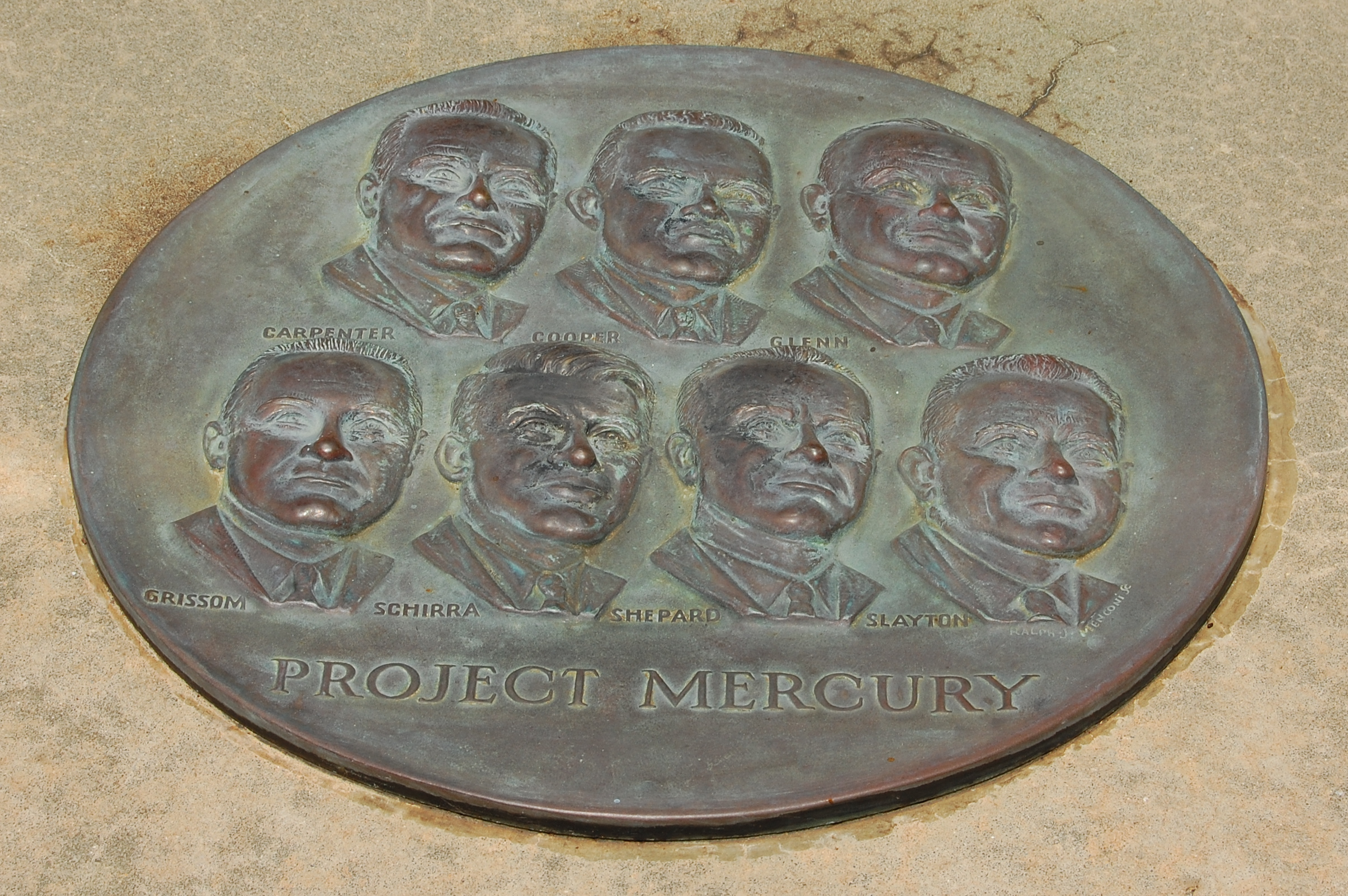
Plaque at Launch Complex 14

After General Motors executive Ed Cole presented Shepard with a brand-new Chevrolet Corvette, Jim Rathmann, a race car driver who won the Indianapolis 500 in 1960 and who was a Chevrolet dealer in Melbourne, Florida, convinced Cole to turn this into an ongoing marketing campaign. Henceforth, astronauts were able to lease new Corvettes for a dollar a year. All of the Mercury Seven but Glenn took up the offer. Cooper, Grissom and Shepard were soon racing their Corvettes around Cape Canaveral, with the military and local police ignoring their exploits. From a marketing perspective, it was very successful, and helped the highly priced Corvette become established as a desirable brand.

The Mercury astronauts established the style and appearance of astronauts. "I soon learned", Gene Kranz later recalled, "if you saw someone wearing a short-sleeved Ban-Lon shirt and aviator sunglasses, you were looking at an astronaut." While busy with the intense training for their flights, they also drank and partied. Some had affairs with the female groupies that flocked around them. NASA actively sought to protect the astronauts and the agency from negative publicity and maintain an image of "clean-cut, all-American boy[s]." The seven Mercury astronauts agreed to share equally any proceeds from interviews regardless of who flew first.

They were forbidden from being compensated for radio or television appearances, or endorsing commercial products, but were allowed to sell their personal stories. In August 1959, they hired an agent, C. Leo DeOrsey, and he negotiated an exclusive contract with Life magazine on behalf of the astronauts for $500,000 (equivalent to $5,500,000 in 2025) in exchange for exclusive access to their private lives, homes, and families. The money was used as life insurance. Between August, 1959, and May 15, 1963, they each received $71,428.71 (equivalent to $751,166 in 2025). Their official spokesman from 1959 to 1963 was NASA's public affairs officer, USAF Lieutenant Colonel John "Shorty" Powers, who as a result became known in the press as the "eighth astronaut".

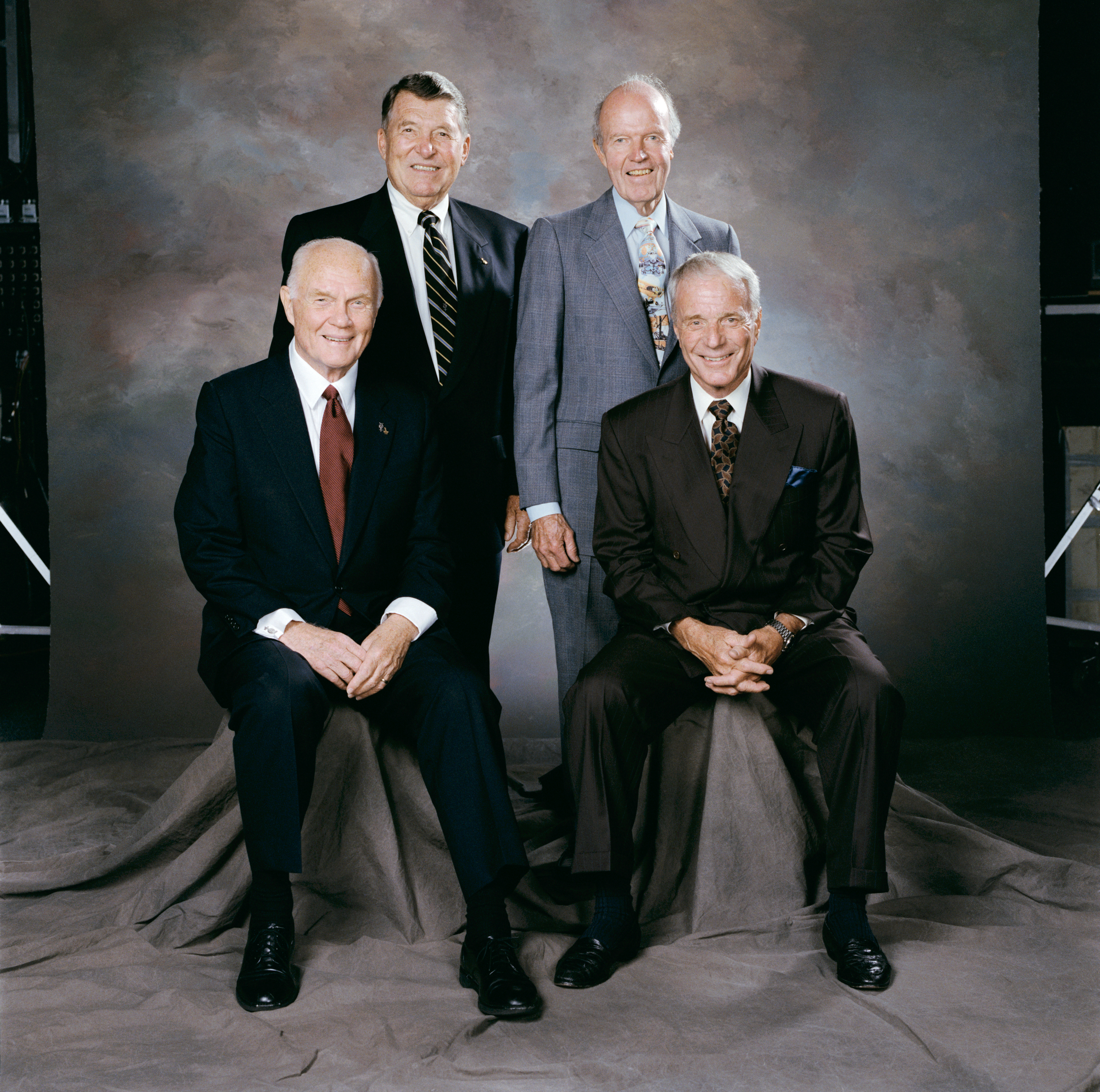
The four surviving Mercury 7 astronauts at a reception after Shepard's memorial service in 1998. Left to right: Glenn, Schirra, Cooper and Carpenter. All are since deceased.

As additional groups of astronauts were selected in the 1960s, the Mercury Seven remained in control of management decisions. The Astronaut Office, which was headed by Shepard, was one of three divisions in the Directorate of Flight Crew Operations, which was headed by Slayton. Since twenty-six of the first thirty astronauts were military personnel, the Astronaut Office had a military character, although few of the astronauts wore their uniforms even as much as once a year. There was a bi-weekly military-style pilots' meeting at which activities planned for the upcoming two weeks would be discussed. A "captain's mast" was held afterwards to adjudicate disputes.

Shepard ran the Astronaut Office on a "rank has its privileges" basis. The Mercury and 1962 astronauts had their own allocated parking spaces outside Building 4 at Johnson Space Center, while astronauts from later groups had to compete for the remaining spaces allotted to astronauts. While Shepard prohibited junior astronauts from receiving gifts and consulting or teaching part-time, he remained vice president and part owner of the Baytown National Bank in Houston, and devoted much of his time to it.

Training was always ungraded; the Mercury astronauts had nothing to gain and much to lose from being objectively compared to the newer classes, as it could threaten their privileged status, managerial control, and priority for flight assignments. The astronaut's attendance at their training events was voluntary. The character of the Astronaut Office would only change after Mercury astronauts retired in the 1970s, and control passed to George Abbey.

The Mercury Seven wrote first-hand accounts of their selection and preparation for the Mercury missions in the 1962 book We Seven. In 1979 Tom Wolfe published a less sanitized version of their story in The Right Stuff. Wolfe's book was the basis for the 1983 film of the same name directed by Philip Kaufman, and the 2020 TV series of the same name.

Together with Betty Grissom, Gus Grissom's widow, in 1984 the Mercury astronauts founded the Mercury Seven Foundation, which raises money to provide college scholarships to science and engineering students. It was renamed the Astronaut Scholarship Foundation in 1995. Shepard was elected its first president and chairman, positions which he held until October 1997, when he was succeeded by Jim Lovell.

Glenn became the first American in orbit in 1962. In 1998 (while a sitting U.S. senator) he flew on the Space Shuttle Discovery, and became the oldest person to fly in space at the time, aged 77. He was the last living member of the Mercury Seven when he died in 2016 at the age of 95.

Scott, Virgil, Gordon, John, and Alan Tracy from Gerry Anderson's television series Thunderbirds were named in honor of the astronauts Carpenter, Grissom, Cooper, Glenn, and Shepard.

== Awards and honors ==
The Mercury 7 group won the Society of Experimental Test Pilots' Iven C. Kincheloe Award in 1963. President John F. Kennedy presented the astronaut group the 1962 Collier Trophy at the White House "for pioneering manned space flight in the United States". The Mercury 7 monument at Launch Complex 14, where the four Mercury-Atlas launches took place, was dedicated on November 10, 1964. A time capsule containing reports, photographs and a movie is buried beneath the monument, to be opened in 2464.

== See also ==
- Mercury 13

== Bibliography ==
- Atkinson, Joseph D.; Shafritz, Jay M. (1985). The Real Stuff: A History of NASA's Astronaut Recruitment Program. Praeger special studies. New York: Praeger. ISBN 978-0-03-005187-6. OCLC 12052375.
- Boomhower, Ray E. (2004). Gus Grissom: The Lost Astronaut. Indiana Biography Series. Indianapolis: Indiana Historical Society. ISBN 978-0-87195-176-2.
- Burgess, Colin (2011). Selecting the Mercury Seven: The Search for America's First Astronauts. Springer-Praxis books in space exploration. New York; London: Springer. ISBN 978-1-4419-8405-0. OCLC 747105631.
- Burgess, Colin (2016). Faith 7: L. Gordon Cooper, Jr., and the Final Mercury Mission. Springer-Praxis books in space exploration. New York; London: Springer. ISBN 978-3-319-30562-2. OCLC 1026785988.
- Carpenter, M. Scott; Cooper, L. Gordon Jr.; Glenn, John H. Jr.; Grissom, Virgil I.; Schirra, Walter M. Jr.; Shepard, Alan B. Jr.; Slayton, Donald K. (2010) [1962]. We Seven: By the Astronauts Themselves. New York: Simon & Schuster Paperbacks. ISBN 978-1-4391-8103-4. LCCN 62019074. OCLC 429024791.
- Carpenter, Scott; Stoever, Kris (2003). For Spacious Skies: The Uncommon Journey Of A Mercury Astronaut. New York: NAL Trade. ISBN 978-0-451-21105-7. OCLC 52821294.
- Chaikin, Andrew (2007). A Man on the Moon: The Voyages of the Apollo Astronauts. New York: Penguin Books. ISBN 978-0-14-311235-8. OCLC 958200469.
- Compton, W. David (1988). Where No Man Has Gone Before (PDF). Washington, DC: NASA. ISBN 978-1-306-35053-2. OCLC 868270614. SP-4214.
- Cooper, Gordon; Henderson, Bruce (2000). Leap of Faith. New York: Harper Collins. ISBN 978-0-06-019416-1. OCLC 59538671.
- Cunningham, Walter (2009) [1977]. The All-American Boys. New York: ipicturebooks. ISBN 978-1-87696-324-8. OCLC 1062319644.
- Eppley, Charles V. (March 1963). History of the USAF Experimental Test Pilot School 4 February 1951 – 12 October 1961 (PDF). Edwards Air Force Base, California: United States Air Force. Archived from the original (PDF) on May 1, 2019.
- Gubert, Betty Kaplan; Sawyer, Miriam; Fannin, Caroline M. (2002). Distinguished African Americans in Aviation and Space Science. Westport, Connecticut: Oryx Press. ISBN 978-0-313-09239-8. OCLC 651897906.
- Koppel, Lily (2013). The Astronaut Wives Club. New York: Grand Central Publishing. ISBN 978-1-4555-0325-4. OCLC 816563627.
- Kranz, Gene (2000). Failure Is Not an Option: Mission Control from Mercury to Apollo 13 and Beyond. New York: Simon & Schuster. ISBN 978-0-7432-0079-0. LCCN 00027720. OCLC 43590801.
- Logsdon, John M.; Launius, Roger D., eds. (2008). Volume VII Human Spaceflight: Projects Mercury, Gemini, and Apollo (PDF). Exploring the Unknown: Selected Documents in the History of the U.S. Civil Space Program. Washington, DC: NASA. OCLC 931719123.
- O'Leary, Brian (1971). The Making of an Ex-Astronaut. London: Michael Joseph. ISBN 978-0-7181-0849-6. OCLC 16189960.
- Sherrod, Robert (1975). "Men for the Moon". In Cortright, Edgar M (ed.). Apollo Expeditions to the Moon. Washington, DC: NASA. pp. 143–166. OCLC 1623434. SP-350. Archived from the original on February 19, 2008.
- Shesol, Jeff (2021). Mercury Rising: John Glenn, John Kennedy, and the New Battleground of the Cold War. New York: W. W. Norton & Company. ISBN 978-1-324-00325-0. OCLC 1196175397.
- Slayton, Donald K. "Deke"; Cassutt, Michael (1994). Deke! U.S. Manned Space: From Mercury to the Shuttle (1st ed.). New York: Forge. ISBN 978-0-312-85503-1. OCLC 937566894.
- Swenson, Loyd S. Jr.; Grimwood, James M.; Alexander, Charles C. (1966). This New Ocean: A History of Project Mercury (PDF). The NASA History Series. Washington, DC: NASA. OCLC 569889. NASA SP-4201.
- Thompson, Neal (2004). Light This Candle: The Life & Times of Alan Shepard, America's First Spaceman (1st ed.). New York: Crown Publishers. ISBN 978-0-609-61001-5. LCCN 2003015688. OCLC 52631310.
- Warren-Findley, Jannelle (1998). "The Collier as Commemoration: The Project Mercury Astronauts and the Collier Trophy". In Mack, Pamela E. (ed.). From Engineering Science to Big Science: The NACA and NASA Collier Trophy Research Project Winners. The NASA History Series. Washington, DC: NASA History Office, Office of Policy and Plans. pp. 165–166. ISBN 978-0-16-049640-0. LCCN 97027899. OCLC 37451762. NASA SP-4219.
- Wolfe, Tom (1979). The Right Stuff. New York: Farrar, Straus, and Giroux. ISBN 978-0-553-27556-8. OCLC 849889526.
