= Women's oversized fashion in the United States since the 1920s =

Oversized fashion, distinct from plus-sized fashion, consists of clothing and other accessories that are larger than normal and reflect some sort of attitude, message, or trend of the period at hand. While oversized fashion trends from the 1920s to the turn of the century vary from decade to decade, there are many overarching themes that have been expressed during the past one hundred or so years. Masculinity, for example, has played a large role in many of the underlying communications of the fashions, although virility is manifested differently in the clothing depending on the era. Oversized fashion production, furthermore, runs largely parallel with the states of the American and global economies. Modernly, oversized fashion has taken on a new form - primarily in the realm of oversized accessories.

== The 1920s ==
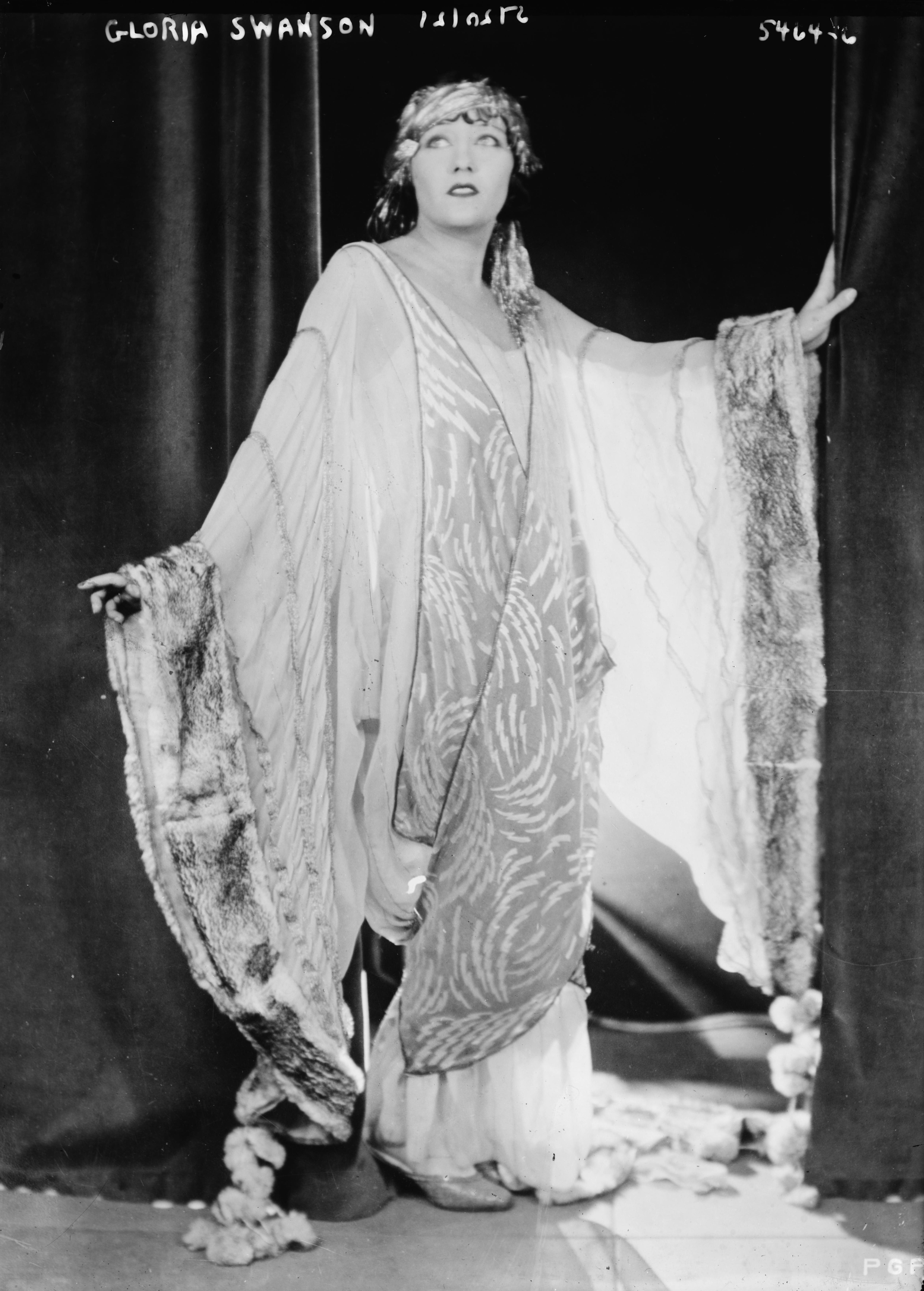
Chiffon evening dress, 1921

The 1920s were marked by a post-war aesthetic. After World War I, the fashion world experienced a great switch: from tight corsets and hobble skirts—to shapeless, oversized, and sparsely decorated garments. Women began to wear more comfortable fashions, including blousy skirts and trousers. Further, this era gave birth to sportswear fashion. Sportswear, previously recognized as America's main contribution to fashion, consisted of a casual more relaxed style. Coco Chanel, known as the first modern dressmaker, made one of the greatest contributions to style in the 1920s: the two-piece dress. She created two-piece dresses out of jersey (fabric), a comfortable stretchy fabric. The American public was receptive, embracing this relaxed style, which was perfect for the active woman on the go. The combination of these new ideas yielded this loosely fitted, modernized style.

The "boyish figure", moreover, became a prevalent trends of the era, with shapeless silhouettes and dropped waistlines giving a more masculine look to the female figure. The emphasis on a flattened chest revolutionized the construction of undergarments. Along with this new silhouette, 1920s fashions were further modernized by the coming of a new generation of sewing-machines, each with an individual electric motor, enabling designers to create more oversized fashions, while saving time and resources.

In contrast to the "boyish figure" were the types of hats and accessories women wore in the Roaring Twenties. Flapper dresses were juxtaposed with oversized hats, often trimmed with large bows, feathers, ribbons, or sequins. Furthermore, bold headbands were often worn to complement women's customarily shorter hair lengths. Since a lot of women's fashion from this decade were quite masculine in style, many women adorned them with accessories that were rather feminine.

Music also had an influence in the ways in which fashions evolved. The Jazz Age saw the popularization of flaps in dresses; and stars such as the entertainer Josephine Baker became known for their semi-translucent flapper frocks.

== The 1930s ==
The 1930s started in depression and ended with the onset of World War II. With rising unemployment and despair, no industry was left unaffected. In the fashion industry, designers cut their prices and produced new lines of ready-to-wear clothes, along with clothing made of more economical and washable fabrics, such as rayon and nylon. For example, Coco Chanel showed a collection of evening dresses made of cotton and sold dresses reduced by 50%. The fashions of the 1930s were stylish and elegant, with flowing lines and Paris-based coutures.

Since many women could not afford to update their wardrobes, women changed their look by resorting to alterations to exemplify the oversized fashion of the 1930s. They used lengthening bands of contrasting fabric and added fur to their hems. This inventive way to put together new articles of clothing gave birth to the "Feedsack Dress"; constructed from the material of a sack of animal feed, these frocks were typically cut similarly to shift dresses. This A-line cuts were boxy and contrasted the slinky and sensual bias-cut dresses that became famous during the same era for their ability to cover the woman's body while clinging to each curve. Furthermore, material was added to collars and sleeves. Another trend rising from the 1930s was the "Banjo Sleeve", created by sewing two rectangular pieces of fabric with the top seam only sewn halfway to allow the arm to flow out. The boxy shape was oversized and blousy. As the era progressed, skirts that flared out fell to the bottom of the calf and sleeves were loosely tied as they fell from the elbow to wrist.

From the harsh economic conditions of the time came about the glamorous 1930s in film, and the glamorous clothing worn seen on the screen grew in popularity. Dresses constructed from Chiffon fabric were rather loose-fitting as they flew away from the body, and embodied the elegance that was maintained throughout the 1930s despite the economic struggles.

== The 1940s ==
During the first half of the 1940s, many clothing-related commodities were in short supply due to World War II; the United States Government relinquished numerous products for utilization in warfare. Leather, for example, was much used in the uniforms of American servicemen—so the material, to a large extent, went out of use in mainstream fashion. As a consequence, oversized fashion utilizing excessive amounts of material was not in style.

Designers such as Cristóbal Balenciaga, Digby Morton, and Norman Hartnell, however, utilized oversized fashion practices in their early 1940s collections to manifest the consequential happenings of the war. While men were abroad taking up arms, many women took on their positions in factories and offices. Accordingly, women's fashion became more masculine. Wide-legged slacks and pronounced shoulder pads became all the rage, and most American women embraced the virile style.

Not until the second half of the decade, though, with the introduction of Dior's “New Look,” was oversized fashion widely put to use. Dior's “New Look,” which first grew in popularity in Europe, featured full skirts that reached the mid-calves. When Dior initially set in motion this new style, the fashion house received a lot of criticism. Sir Stafford Cripps, then President of the Britain's Board of Trade, was quoted as saying that the “New Look” was “utterly stupid” and an enormous waste of labor and materials. He was not the only one opposed to the excessive usage of material. In the U.S., legislation was passed that restricted yardage in fabric for clothing, under a policy entitled L-85.

Many American citizens resisted the new legislation, with groups being formed such as the “A Little Below the Knee Club” in Texas. However, in the U.S., Dior's "New Look" was also shaping the trends of the time. Designer Claire McCardell, influenced by Parisian design, created the monastic dress, in jersey, featuring a criss-cross string belt at midriff and a draped full skirt. A few years later, however, once World War II ended, the “New Look” and its oversized flair was relished both within the fashion world and the consumer market.

== The 1950s ==
The post-war era of the 1950s brought a change to the family dynamic as well as to the fashion world. In 1947, Christian Dior launched as the first collection from his fashion house his "Corelle line", which featured oversized designs. The "Corelle line" became the look of the decade, ushering femininity, luxury and grace into the era, and making a great impact on the female silhouette. This change implemented by Christian Dior dominated the decade.

Clothes transformed from boxy styles, with square shoulders, to feminine and luxurious, with soft shoulder lines, corseted waists, round padded hips, and long skirts, leading to the knee-length "sack" dress. The knee-length skirts and dresses were the most oversized items of this 1950s. The introduction of new fabrics, including Terylene, Orlon, Banlon, Acrilan and Poplin, allowed for new fashion styles to be both created and introduced. Among these were the "wash-and-wear" sweater, the permanently pleated skirt, and the "drip-dry" skirt. Skirts of this era known as circle skirts were supported by layers of petticoats, creating a circular look that accentuated the waist line. Essentially, the petticoat reinforced the femininity of this period.

The 1950s woman also tended to be influenced by the fashions worn by movie stars such as Marilyn Monroe and Audrey Hepburn. Hepburn in her roles in various movies such as Roman Holiday famously wore an oversized skirt that accentuated her waist, together with a tighter shirt.

== The 1960s ==
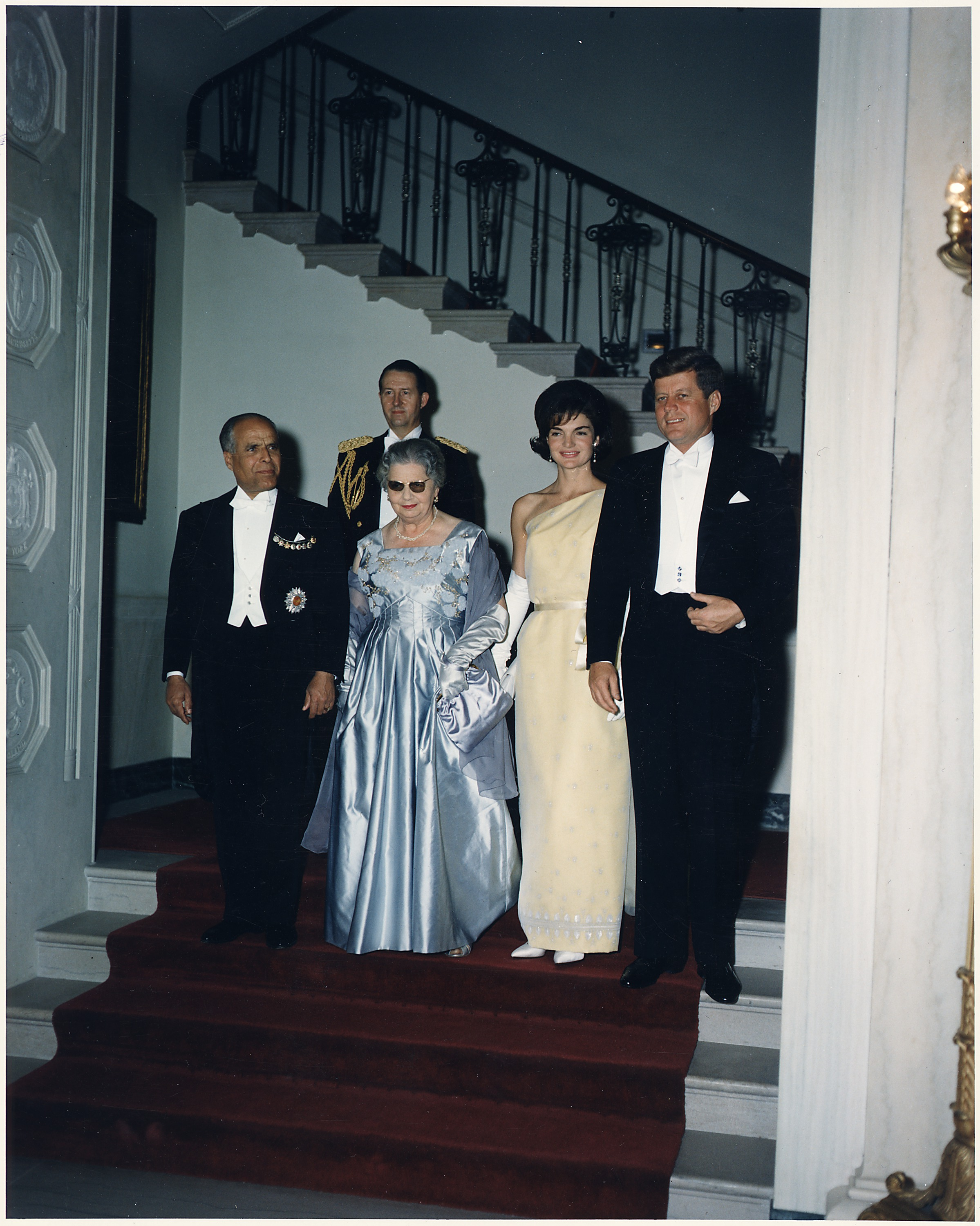
Mrs.Kennedy and President of Tunisia (Mr. Habib Bourguiba) with Wife (Mrs. Bourguiba)

The look of the 1960s was in marked contrast to the “New Look” developed in the end of the 1940s that heavily influenced trends of the 1950s with femininity and sensuality. The look of the 1960s reflected the main issue of that time: Civil Rights. The 1960s woman “demanded equal rights and equal pay, wanted to be free, to look young and to have fun”. Oversized fashions were utilized in more subtle ways in this decade, giving rise to trends that revolutionized the working woman and gave a voice to more conservative feminines.

To achieve this youthful and flirty look, skirts were shortened, creating a look reminiscent of the 1920s. During this era, in 1965, the miniskirt was developed. An alternative to this exposed look was in high demand, thus leading to the creation of the midi skirt. This new "midi" mainly featured a pleated A-line bodice, which allowed it to flow away from the body. This oversized fashion began to make its way to the workplace as it provided both femininity and formality. Evening wear was also affected, and both long and short dresses could be seen at engagements. Designs embraced the oversized look through more elegant silhouettes, specially in evening wear, which boasted loose forms and fluid fabrics. The change in fashion during this period was also due to international influences such as from London and France, where designers were young. A notable point about this period is that women also began to wear pants-suits and jeans.

The materials used for both clothing and accessories changed during this era. Increasingly used were easy-care synthetic fabrics such as Crimplene, Dacron and Terylene. The benefits of such synthetic fabrics were that they were crease-resistant, easy to wash, and required little to no ironing. Designers such as Cristóbal Balenciaga embraced these new types of materials, using them in oversized dolman-sleeve jackets. The pattern for this piece was cut in a rectangular shape forming a boxy blousy look.

During this period, synthetic yarns that took dyes easily were used. Leather-look plastic also helped to create a vibrant feel to accessories such as shoes, umbrellas and additional clothing items such as mini-skirts. While in this era, clothing became split along lines of age, there were overriding oversized trends including: midi skirts, Dolman sleeves, loose jackets and shapeless frocks. Another factor contributing to the trends of this period was the “post-industrial boom” that helped to generate wealth in the United States. Jackie Kennedy, wife of President John F. Kennedy, became a model of French fashions and helped to spur the spread of the miniskirt, along with Twiggy, who gained iconic status as the face and body of the era wearing the shapeless mod dresses that were a huge trend. Jackie Kennedy's “beehive” hairstyle also highlighted oversized fashion.

== The 1970s ==
The 1970s is often referred to as the “Me Decade”, a term originally coined by writer Tom Wolfe. There were many groups, such as political and extremist groups, wanting a piece of the action. With respect to dress, it was an “anything goes” era, without rules. This manifested in some ways via the production of oversized fashion.

Fashion styles were inspired by previous decades, hinting at both nostalgia and an interest in other cultures. The current political and economic situation of the United States, including the civil rights, unemployment levels, war and terrorism, were reflected in the manner in which individuals dressed. With the women's movement of the 1970s, radical feminists could be stereotyped for their anti-high fashion sentiments; these women required low maintenance and made a statement. With regards to high fashion, established fashion houses produced more ready-to-wear collections and casual attire.

With nostalgia a big theme of this period, secondhand clothes were key. Similar to the 1950s, 1920s clothing also influenced this decade, along with fashions of the '30s, '40s and '50s. Television and movies such as The Godfather and Grease also played homage to styles of the past. When not inspired by nostalgia, fashion took another turn whereby "the idea was to appear as if your body had been spray painted". To achieve this look, leotards were worn and were accessorized with short frilled skirts, cap sleeves and leg-warmers. “Hot pants” or skimpy shorts were also popular in the beginning of the '70s. By the mid-1970s, we see the reemergence of “unstructured design” from the fashion houses. These were considered the simplest cuts, appearing to look as if no skilled cutting was required. Typical of this cut is Issey Miyake’s wool cowboy look for winter 1978-79, an example of experimentation in textured knitting. The unstructured design of the 1970s highlights the oversized fashion of the decade.

== The 1980s ==
The beginning of the 1980s was the first time when women assumed high-status roles in the workplace. Akin to the 1940s, women's fashion in the 1980s was quite masculine, which was a reflection of women wanting to be taken seriously as working professionals. The three most important designers at the start of this decade, Calvin Klein, Giorgio Armani, and Ralph Lauren, were designing clothing that was characterized by broad and square shoulders. This use of oversized shoulders was largely a demonstration of women not wanting to be viewed by their feminine figures, but rather to be viewed equally in their careers.

Designers such as Rei Kawakubo of Comme des Garçons and Yohji Yamamoto began designing with a Japanese-inspired aesthetics. Clothing became much more oversized to better resemble kimono and other flowing Japanese garments. As with oversized shoulders, this Japanese style had the effect of disguising the womanly shape. Donna Karan, who became known at the time as "the Queen of 7th Avenue,", also began utilizing this Japanese style of dress.

Figures both within and outside the fashion world took on this gender-neutral style and made the look ever more popular. Singer, actress, and model Grace Jones was a key figure in furthering this type of fashion—keeping her hair short and wearing manly, oversized clothing. Scottish singer Annie Lennox did the same, but had much more of an effect in the musical realm.

Another essential person who helped further the style of oversized fashion in the 1980s was Princess Diana, who for her wedding to Charles, Prince of Wales in July 1981 wore an oversized wedding dress—making the tailor popular all around the world for the remainder of the decade.

== The 1990s ==
The 1990s was one of the most diverse eras for fashion. As the fashion world began to experience technological modernization, along with a widespread support from mainstream consumers, the industry felt the need to appeal to different types of audiences. Some of the women's fashion trends included neon and pastel colors, legging and exercise wear, the hippie look, and a hip-hop style. The last of those examples, hip-hop style, is identifiable as the oversized fashion of the '90s. The influence of hip-hop on urban fashion was overtly strong. Urban fashion was distinctly designed for African-American youth.

The 1990s urban style heavily influenced by Black Nationalism and African trends began with the blousy pant sported by famous figures in the rap world such as MC Hammer, who popularized oversized "Hammer pants", and fezzes. However, men were not the only ones to embrace this new form of street wear. Women too began to explore the trend. The group TLC (band) and R&B singer Aaliyah created their own urban fashion for women. The trend consisted of wearing oversized pants and big flannel shirts. The hardcore aspect of rap did not fully permit the women to embrace a feminine look that might make them appear weaker. However, some femininity was maintained by the wearing of more fitted shirts, bare midsections and sports bras, while still being hard with the blousy pieces.

During the upheaval of the streetwear fashion, models of color began to make their mark in the industry. It was during the 1990s that Tyra Banks found fame. After being rejected by six modeling agency the young Banks was signed by Elite Model Management, and in her first season as a model she booked 25 shows in Paris Fashion Week. Banks' seductive walk impressed designers and made her a hot commodity. Designers who were influenced by the new oversized streetwear were more likely to book models of color to show their designs. Other famous models of color during the time include Naomi Campbell and Iman. Undoubtedly, oversized fashion marked the beginning of a new trend for urban youth during the 1990s.

== The 2000s ==
Women's oversized fashion at the turn of the century is largely displayed in various accessories. At the beginning of the 2000s, many designers began using sizable and bulky glasses and jewelry in their lines, and women in the spheres of fashion, music, and film began wearing these oversized decorations. Celebrities such as Nicole Richie and Rachel Zoe helped to further this wearing of oversized accessories, and assisted in making the items popular in everyday wear. As the decade progressed, the utility of oversized accessories did not wane, but rather became even more widely used.

Since the year 2006, three designers have garnered massive amounts of attention for their adoption of oversized fashion: Stella McCartney, Alexander McQueen, and Marc Jacobs. In 2006, McQueen put on a show in which an enormous Pepper's ghost illusion of Kate Moss dressed in yards of rippling fabric adorned the backdrop of catwalk; this move furthered the attention of oversized fashion and made Moss the poster model for oversized styling. The death of McQueen in February 2010 led to his style of fashion accruing even more attention, which put oversized fashion even more on the map.

Another exhibition of the trend is the oversized handbag. Designers such as Balenciaga, Betsey Johnson, and Michael Kors began producing purses and satchel-like bags that were larger than usual and complied with the oversized aesthetic. As a result of the enormous increase in influence of the internet and social media, these bags quickly became very popular after pictures of celebrities carrying them were posted online for many to see and then emulate.

The reviews of oversized fashion use in the new millennium have been mixed. Some designers and critics have welcomed the utilization of oversized accessories, while others view the trend as prodigal. Young designers and fashion houses such as McCartney, McQueen, and Jacobs generally esteem oversized accessories, while older and more established couturiers such as Chanel find much oversized accessories distasteful and extravagant.

== See also ==
- Fashion accessory
- Fashion design
- Masculinity
- Index of fashion articles
- List of fashion topics
- History of Western fashion
- History of fashion design
