= Allen O. Gamble =

American physiologist

- Born: 8 February 1910; South Korea
- Died: 24 April 2001 (aged 91); Sandy Spring, Maryland
- Education: Duke University (BA, 1931); Birmingham–Southern College (MA, 1933); University of California, Berkeley (PhD, 1949)
- Occupation: aeronautical engineer

Allen Owen Gamble (8 February 1910 – 24 April 2001) was an American physiologist. As the associate director of personnel for manpower at the National Aeronautics and Space Administration (NASA), he oversaw that organization's expansion from 8,000 in the late 1950s to 40,000 in the early 1960s. His activities also included the selection of the Mercury Seven astronauts.

== Biography ==
Allen Owen Gamble was born on 8 February 1910, in Korea, where his parents were methodist missionaries. He earned a Bachelor of Arts degree from Duke University in 1931, and then a Master of Arts from Birmingham Southern College in 1934.

Gamble began working for the federal government in 1939, taking a position at the Department of Labor in 1939. During World War II he served in the U.S. Navy, where he constructed, analyzed and coordinated the testing of naval aviation cadets. He reached the rank of lieutenant commander. After the war, he joined the National Advisory Committee for Aeronautics (NACA) as its manpower director. He earned his Ph.D. from the University of California, Berkeley, in 1949, writing his thesis on "An analytical study of the nature of research work in physical science". He became a reservist in the U.S. Air Force, reaching the rank of lieutenant colonel.

In 1955, Gamble moved to the National Science Foundation as director of the national register of scientific and technical personnel. He joined the newly created National Aeronautics and Space Administration (NASA) as its associate director of personnel for manpower in 1959. In this role he oversaw that organization's expansion from 8,000 in the late 1950s to 40,000 in the early 1960s. His activities also included the selection of the Mercury Seven astronauts. He became the chief of the Manpower Planning and Studies Branch at the National Institutes of Health in 1967, and retired in 1974. In later life, Gamble had Parkinson's disease. He died of pneumonia at Brooke Grove Nursing Center in Sandy Spring, Maryland, on 24 April 2001. He was survived by his wife. Edith Long Gamble, and two sisters.
