= James Dutton (astronaut) =

American astronaut (born 1968)

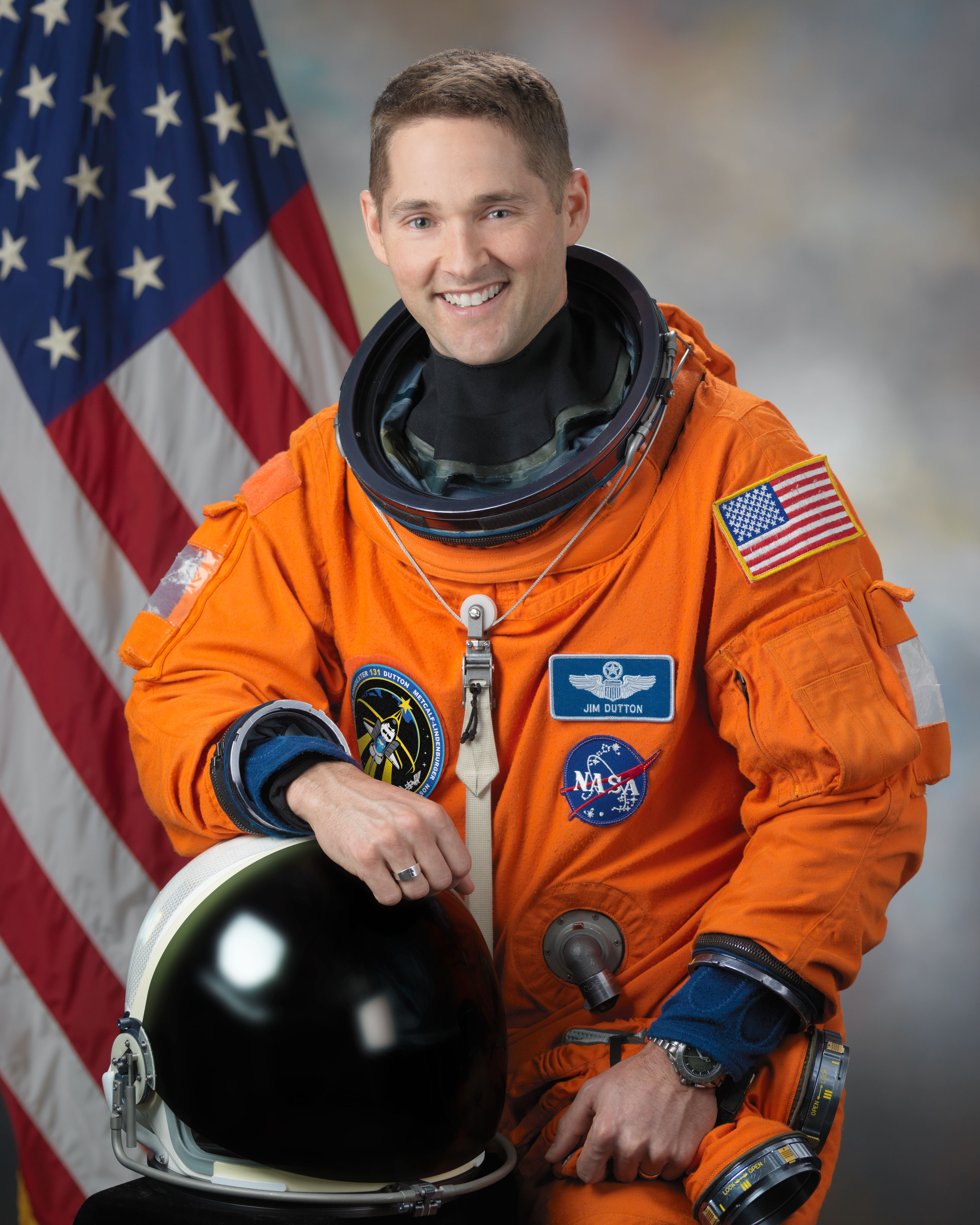
- Dutton in 2009
- Born: James Patrick Dutton Jr. November 20, 1968 (age 57); Eugene, Oregon, U.S.
- Other name: Mash
- Education: United States Air Force Academy (BS); University of Washington (MS)
- Space career

NASA astronaut
- Rank: Colonel, USAF
- Time in space: 15d 2h 47m
- Selection: NASA Group 19 (2004)
- Missions: STS-131
- Retired: June 2012

James Patrick Dutton Jr. (born November 20, 1968) is an engineer, former NASA astronaut pilot of the Class of 2004 (NASA Group 19), and a former test pilot in the US Air Force with the rank of colonel.

== Education ==
Dutton was born November 20, 1968, in Eugene, Oregon, where he received his early education; he attended Cal Young Middle School then graduated from Sheldon High School. He joined the Air Force and graduated first in his class from the United States Air Force Academy in 1991 with a Bachelor of Science degree in Astronautical Engineering. Along with being awarded the top cadet in order of graduation, in an unprecedented feat, he also received the top military cadet, top academic cadet, top pilot and top engineering student awards. He has subsequently earned in 1994 a Master of Science degree in Aeronautics & Astronautics from the University of Washington.

== Career ==
=== Air Force career ===
Dutton is a member of the U.S. Air Force Academy Class of 1991. During this period he was a member of the intercollegiate Cadet Competition Flying Team. Dutton's pilot training was at Sheppard AFB, Texas.

In 1993–1994, Dutton completed his master's degree at the University of Washington, Seattle, Washington.

In 1995 Dutton undertook F-15C training at Tyndall AFB, Florida, then flew as an operational F-15C pilot with the 493d Fighter Squadron "Grim Reapers" at RAF Lakenheath, United Kingdom, from October 1995 to May 1998. During this time he was deployed over Iraq and flew over 100 combat hours providing air superiority in support of Operation Provide Comfort and Operation Northern Watch over northern Iraq. In May 1998, Dutton joined the 422d Test and Evaluation Squadron at Nellis AFB, Nevada, and flew operational test missions in the F-15C.

He was selected to attend the U.S. Air Force Test Pilot School (TPS) and graduated with the Class 00A (the "Dawgs") in December 2000. Dutton served with the 416th Flight Test Squadron flying the F-16 until June 2002.

He joined the F-22 Combined Test Force flying the Raptor with the 411th Flight Test Squadron at Edwards AFB, California, logging over 350 flight hours from August 2002 to June 2004.

After retiring from the US Air Force in 2014 as a Colonel, Dutton has over 3,300 flight hours in over 30 different aircraft.

=== NASA career ===
Dutton was selected by NASA as an astronaut candidate in May 2004 and received his astronaut pin (qualification) on February 10, 2006, with his classmates of Group 19. Dutton was initially assigned to the Exploration Branch working on the development of the Crew Exploration Vehicle (CEV), latter named Orion. He served as Ascent and Entry CAPCOM for Space Shuttle mission STS-122 and STS-123.

Dutton was officially assigned to his first space flight as pilot for STS-131 in December 2008.

After his flight, he served as Deputy Chief, Astronaut Office Shuttle Branch from August 2010 to August 2011 and then Chief of Astronaut Office Exploration Branch from August 2011 until his retirement from NASA in June 2012.

==== STS-131 ====
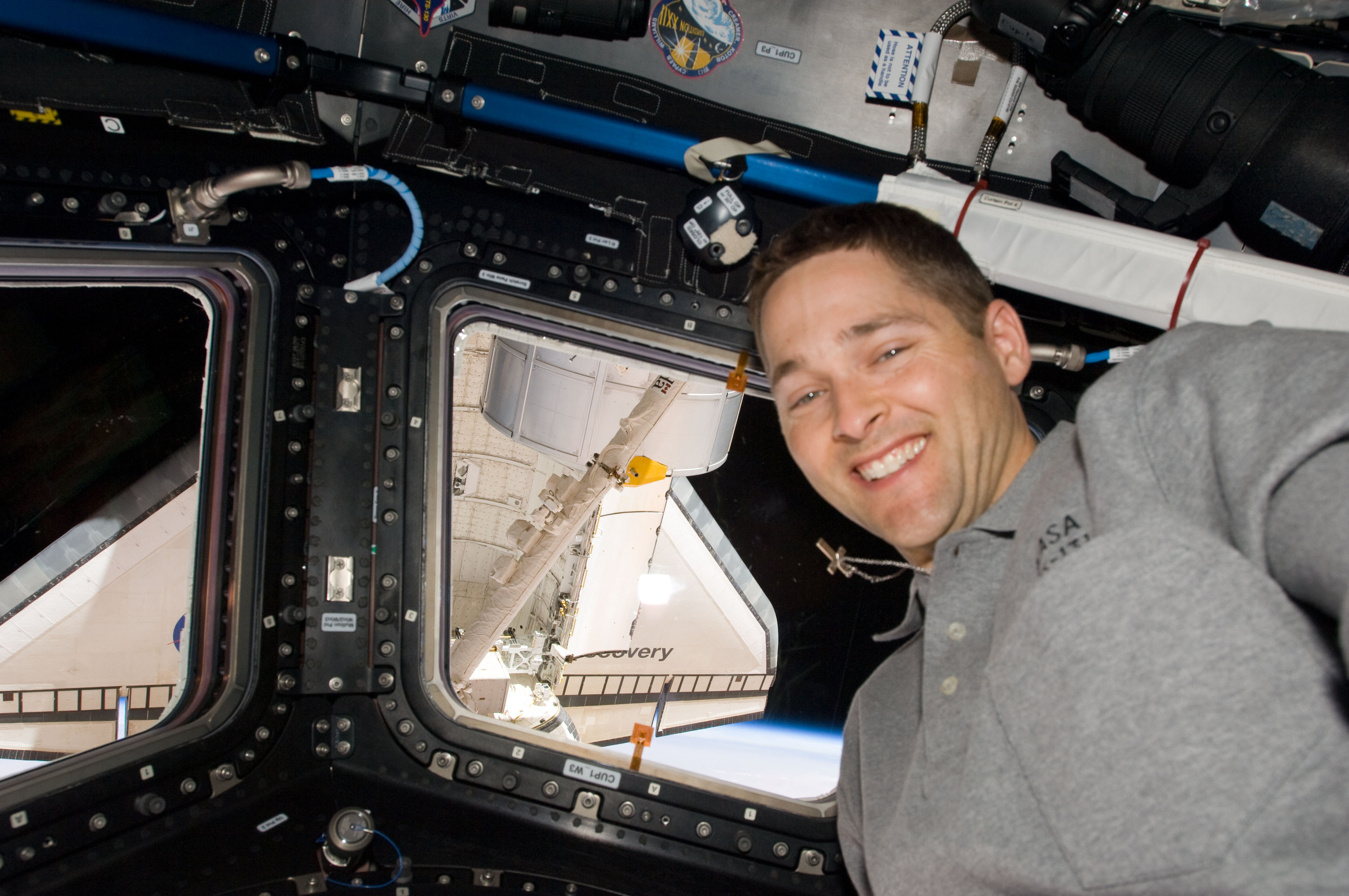
STS-131 James Dutton in the Cupola

STS-131 (April 5–20, 2010) was a resupply mission to the International Space Station performed by Space Shuttle Discovery. Dutton flew as the pilot. He launched with Shuttle Commander Alan Poindexter and Mission Specialists Richard Mastracchio, Dorothy Metcalf-Lindenburger, Stephanie Wilson, Naoko Yamazaki from JAXA and Clay Anderson. Once in orbit, they joined ISS Expedition 23 crew members.

He assisted Poindexter during rendezvous and landing and maneuver the orbiter during undocking and the fly-around. In addition, he served as lead shuttle robotic arm operator for the mission, responsible for airlock operations in preparation for EVAs and he assisted Wilson with the station robotic arm operations. The STS-131 mission was accomplished in 15 days, 2 hours, 47 minutes and 10 seconds and traveled 6,232,235 statute miles in 238 orbits.

=== Post NASA and Air Force career ===
After his retirement for the Air Force, he became an airline pilot with Southwest Airlines. In June 2020, Dutton joined Dynetics, Inc. as a technical advisor on their design for NASA's Human Landing System (HLS) supporting the Artemis program.

== Family and interests ==
Dutton is married to the former Erin Ruhoff, also from Eugene, and they have four boys. They currently live in Colorado Springs, Colorado

He is a member of the Society of Experimental Test Pilots and the Officers' Christian Fellowship.

== See also ==
- List of astronauts by name
- List of astronauts by selection
- Timeline of astronauts by nationality
