= Robert Satcher =

American astronaut (born 1965)

Bobby Satcher
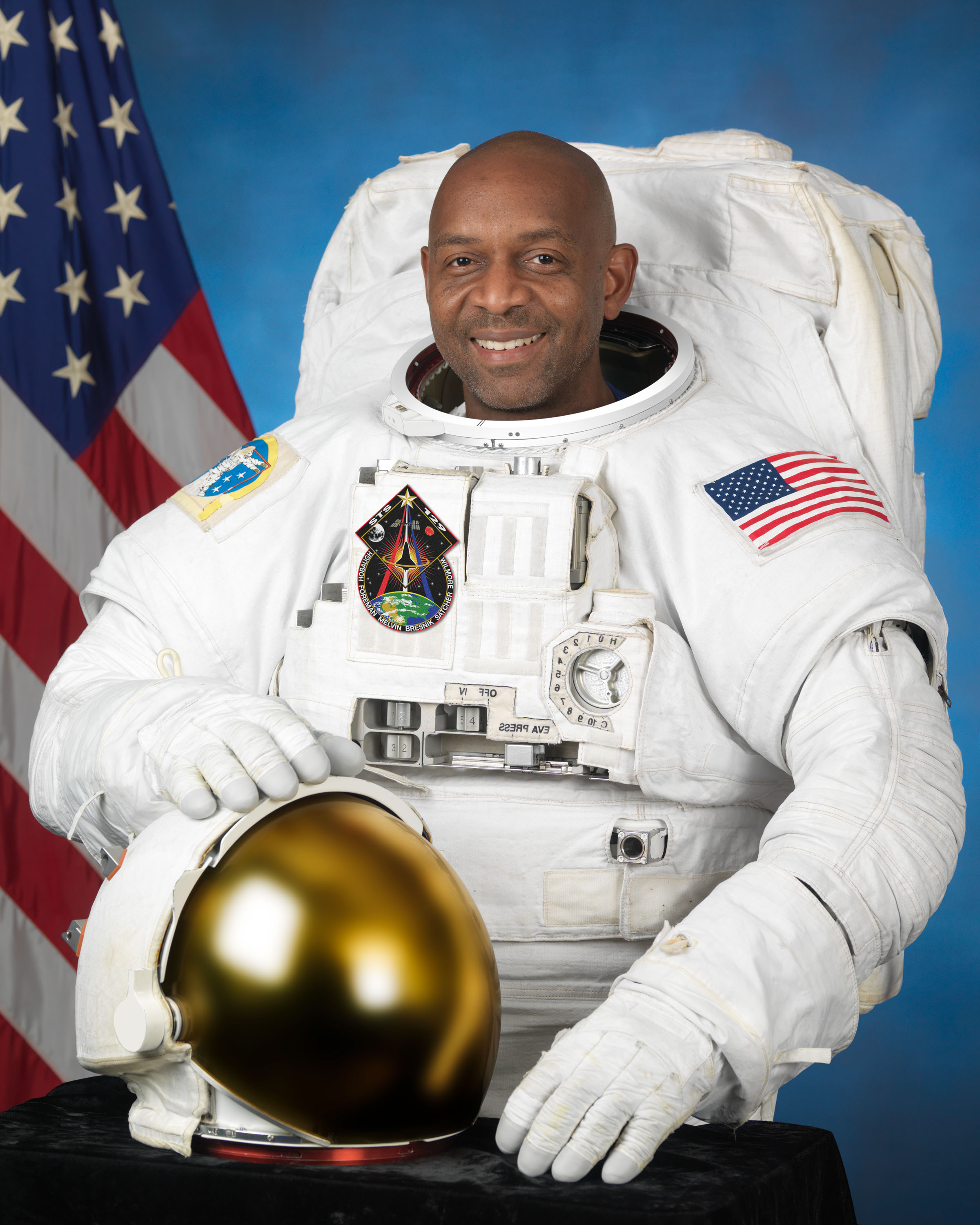
- Born: Robert Lee Satcher Jr. September 22, 1965 (age 61); Hampton, Virginia, U.S.
- Education: Massachusetts Institute of Technology (BS, MS, PhD); Harvard University (MD)
- Space career

NASA astronaut
- Time in space: 10d 19h 16m
- Selection: NASA Group 19 (2004)
- Total EVAs: 2
- Total EVA time: 12h 19m
- Mission: STS-129
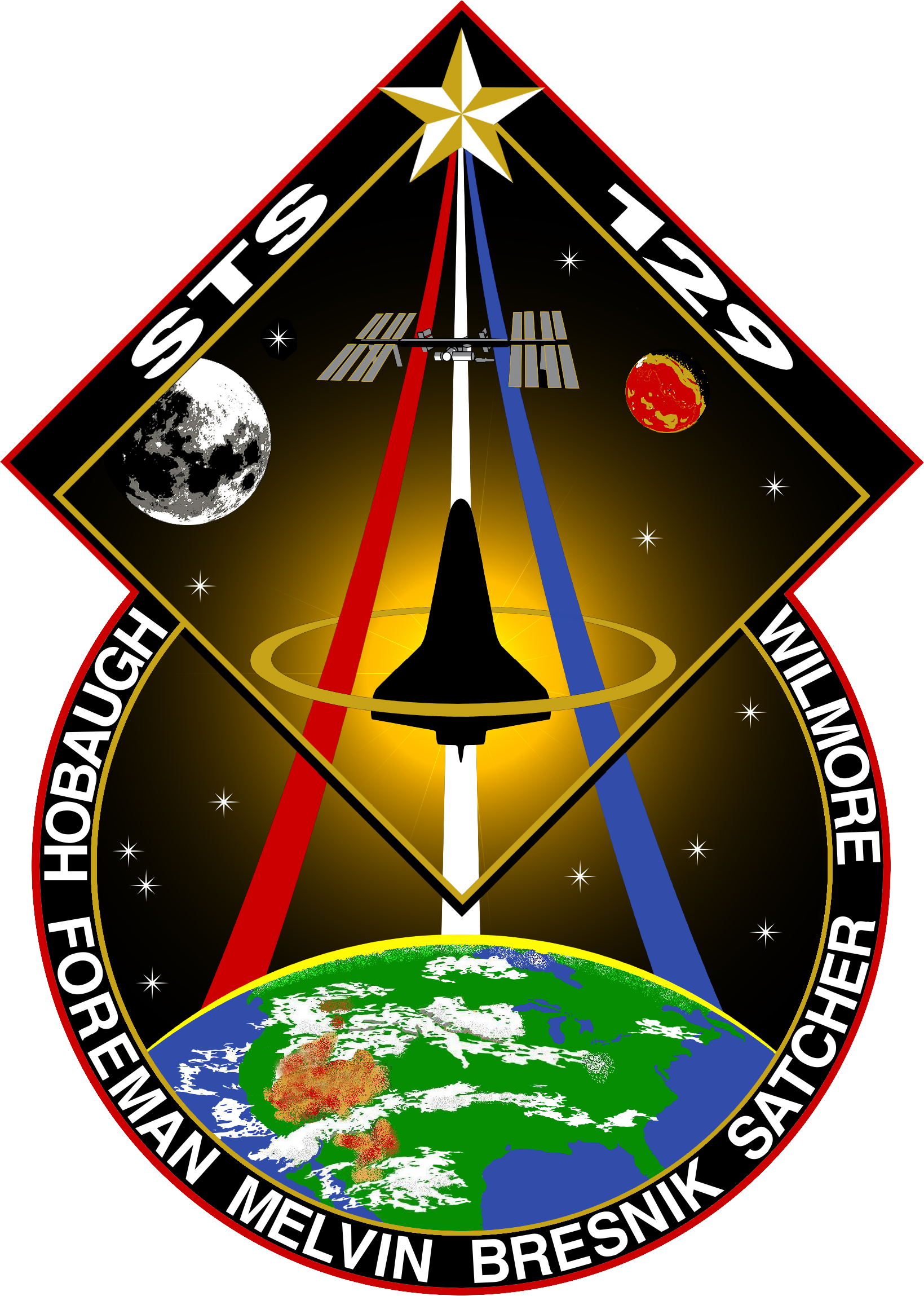
- Mission insignia
- Retired: June 2013

Robert Lee Satcher Jr. (born September 22, 1965) is an American orthopedic surgeon, chemical engineer, and former NASA astronaut. He participated in two spacewalks during STS-129, accumulating 12 hours and 19 minutes of extravehicular activity. Satcher holds two doctorates (Ph.D., M.D.) and has received numerous awards and honors as a surgeon and engineer.

== Early life ==
Robert Lee Satcher Jr. was born in Hampton, Virginia on September 22, 1965 to Robert Lee Satcher and Marian Hanna Satcher. Robert Lee Satcher was the president of Saint Paul's College in Lawrenceville, Virginia, and was from Lawrenceville. Marian Hanna Satcher, from Calhoun County, Alabama was a graduate from Alabama State University. Robert L. Satcher and Marian H. Satcher had four children - Serena Maria Satcher, a physician, Rodney Levi Satcher, and Robin Leon Satcher. Satcher is the nephew of Admiral David Satcher, who was the 10th U.S. Assistant Secretary for Health and the 16th U.S. Surgeon General.

Satcher began school in Corvallis, Oregon then to Hampton, at the Hampton University Laboratory School and Spratley Middle School. Then, his family moved to Denmark, South Carolina. Satcher graduated from a predominantly black Denmark Olar High School in Denmark, South Carolina in 1982 as valedictorian.

== Early career ==
He went on to receive a Bachelor of Science degree in 1986 as well as a doctorate in Chemical Engineering from the Massachusetts Institute of Technology in 1993. He then went on to study medicine at Harvard Medical School, and received his medical doctorate in 1994 through the Harvard–MIT Program in Health Sciences and Technology. Satcher did his internship and residency at the University of California, San Francisco from 1995–2000, and postdoctoral research fellowship at University of California, Berkeley in 1998, and an orthopedic oncology fellowship at the University of Florida from 2000–2001. His specialties are orthopedics and oncology and has contributed to research in adult and child bone cancer.

Prior to being accepted into the astronaut program by NASA, Satcher was the Assistant Professor at The Feinberg School of Medicine, Northwestern University, in the Department of Orthopaedic Surgery in 2001. Satcher also held appointments as an Attending Physician in Orthopaedic Surgery at Children's Memorial Hospital in Chicago, Illinois, specializing in Musculoskeletal Oncology; and an Adjunct Appointment in the Biomedical Engineering Department at Northwestern University School of Engineering.

Satcher was also a member of the Robert H. Lurie Comprehensive Cancer Center and the Institute for Bioengineering and Nanotechnology in Advanced Medicine at Northwestern University. Satcher was also a Schweitzer Fellow at the Albert Schweitzer Hospital, in Lambaréné, Gabon. Satcher's experience in engineering includes internships at DuPont in the Textile Fibers Research Group, and the Polymer Products Division.

== NASA career ==
Satcher names Ronald E. McNair PhD '76, a fellow MIT alumni, who had lost his life in the 1986 Challenger accident as an inspiration. Selected by NASA in May 2004, Satcher completed Astronaut Candidate Training in February 2006. He was trained on scientific and technical briefings, intensive instruction in shuttle and International Space Systems, physiological training, T-38 flight training and water and wilderness survival training. Satcher later worked on the STS-129 mission as a mission specialist. During November 16-29, 2009, Satcher was the first orthopedic oncologist to complete an orbit around Earth on the Space Shuttle Atlantis. He was also the first Black male astronaut and physician to act as the crew's medical doctor to the International Space Station on the STS-129 NASA Space Shuttle mission. During this mission, Satcher repaired ISS exterior robotic arms of the ISS and installed an antenna to improve satellite communication and file updates on Twitter. During the mission, he served as a mission specialist studying the influence of space on the immune system, specifically the effects of zero gravity on muscles and bone density. The mission resulted in 4.5 million miles of travel in 171 orbits. Satcher spent over 259 hours in space and participated in two of the three spacewalks, totaling 12hr 19min.

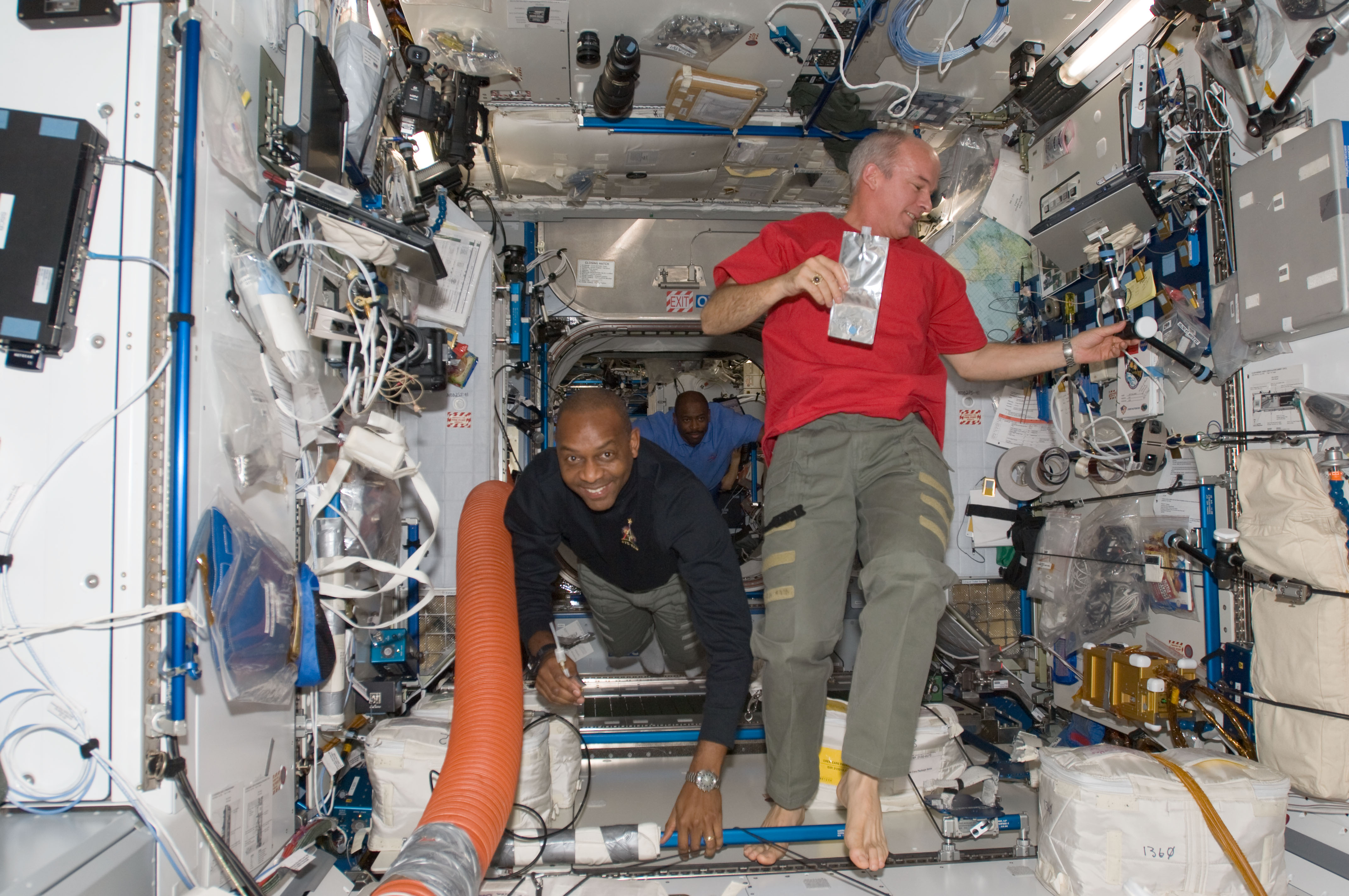
Satcher and Leland Melvin floating inside Node 2. Jeff Williams is enjoying a water drink.

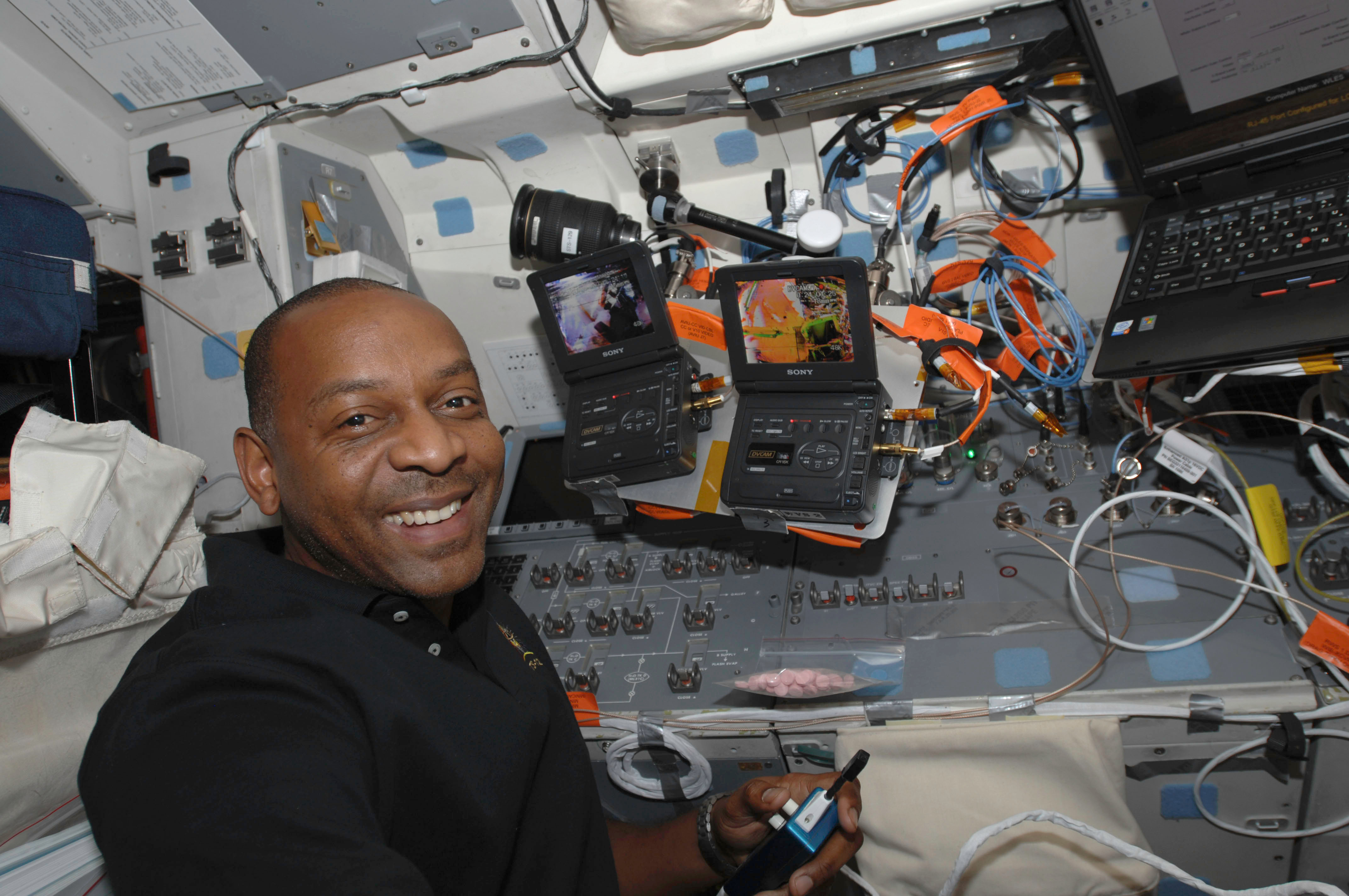
Satcher in the Space Shuttle during STS-129

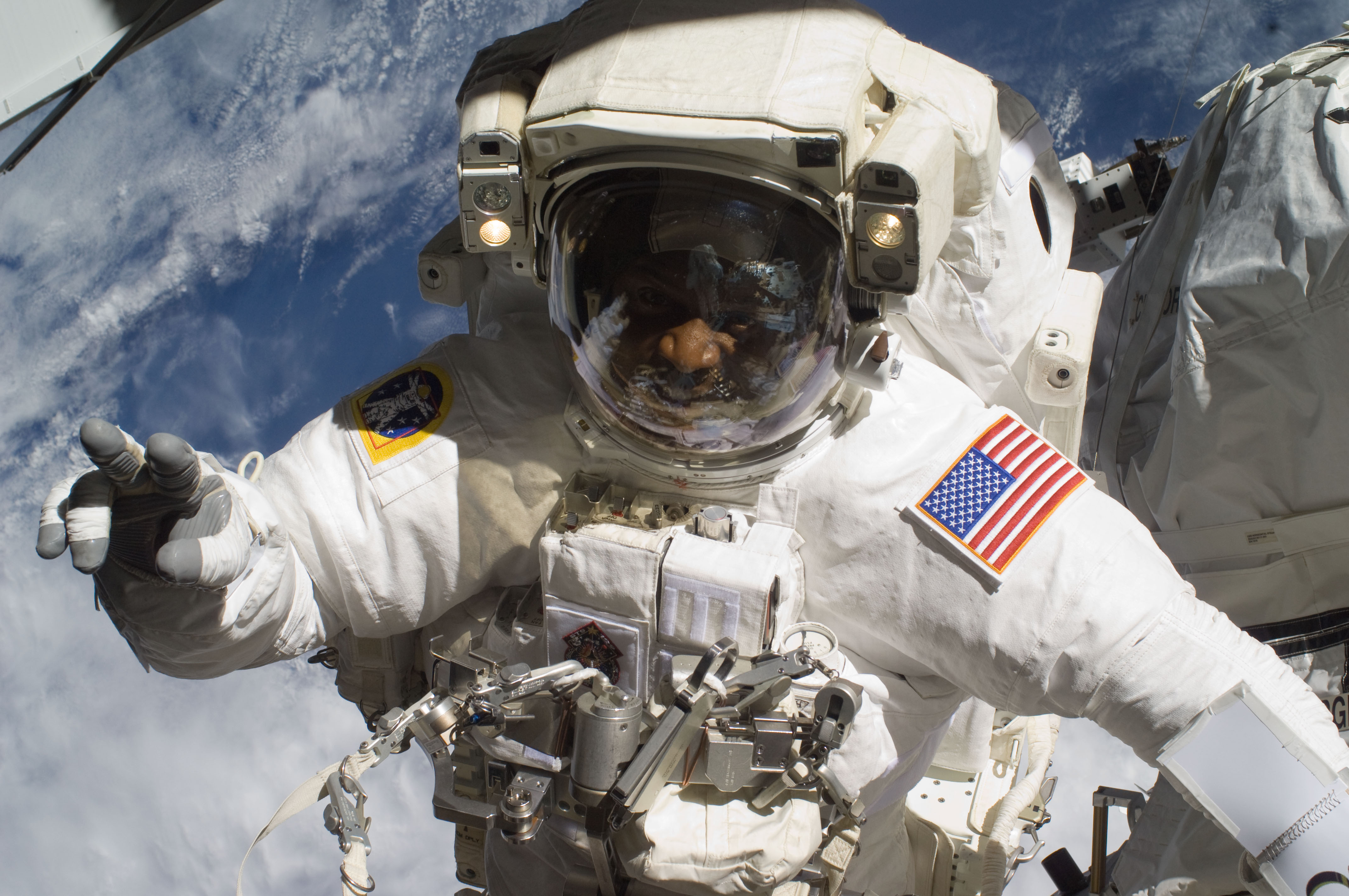
Satcher during his EVA

== Post-NASA career ==
Satcher left NASA and joined The University of Texas M.D. Anderson Cancer Center in 2011, in the Department of Orthopaedic Oncology as a surgical oncologist and assistant professor. He researches the treatment of skeletal metastatic disease, soft tissue sarcoma, technology applications for improving surgical outcomes, teleoncology, and intra-operative navigation. He leads institution-wide efforts to create a clinical enterprise for virtual care. He works extensively at M.D. Anderson Cancer Care Center's Global Oncology enterprise that works with international healthcare partners on a construction of a Cancer Center in sub-Saharan Africa. Additionally, he co-founded the eHealth Research Institute (eHRI) with Rice University and the National Space Biomedical Research Institute. eHRI aims to improve access to specialized health with the latest research and technology. Dr. Satcher holds primary appointment as an associate professor at the University of Texas and is dual-appointed as an adjunct professor at the Ken Kennedy Institute of Information Technology at Rice University.

In 2012, Satcher was invited to present to the commencement address at the Voorhees College in Denmark, South Carolina, while also receiving an honorary doctorate. He also received an honorary doctorate from Saint Paul's College in the same year. In 2019, Satcher was the keynote speaker for the Harvard Medical School and Harvard School of Dental Medicine Class Day. Satcher has written numerous articles and book chapters over the course of his career. Satcher possesses extensive research, teaching, and practicing experience in the U.S. and has been on mission trips to Gabon, Nicaragua, Nigeria, Burkina Faso, and Venezuela.

He was elected to a six-year term on the Harvard Board of Overseers in 2023.

== Professional qualifications ==
- American Board of Orthopaedic Surgery
- Illinois Medical License
- Texas Medical License
- Medical Board of California: Physicians and Surgeon's Certificate
- National Board of Medical Examiners
- DEA Authorization
- Medical Board of California: Physician Assistant Supervisor
- California Fluoroscopy X-Ray Supervisor and Operator
- ATLS and CPR Certifications
- Professional Association of Divers International (SCUBA)

== Professional organizations ==
- American Academy of Orthopaedic Surgeons
- Musculoskeletal Tumor Society
- American Academy of Cancer Research
- Connective Tissue Oncology Society
- National Medical Association
- Society of Black Academic Surgeons
- Doctors United in Medical Missions
- National Comprehensive Cancer Network
- Orthopaedic Research Society
- MIT Alumni Association
- Black Alumni at MIT
- Harvard Alumni Association
- American Telemedicine Organization

== Awards and honors ==
Satcher was a National Merit Scholar, and received the Monsanto Award and the Albert G. Hill Award from MIT, fellowships from both the Robert Wood Johnson Foundation and UNCF/Merck Research department, and is a member of the Tau Beta Pi Engineering Honor Society. Additional honors include:

- Leadership Fellow of American Academic of Orthopaedic Surgeons
- ABC Fellow of American Orthopaedic Association
- Bloomberg Leadership Fellow

Honors & Awards
Date	Name
1982	Scholastic Collegiate Scholarships, DuPont de Nemours Inc
1982	Valedictorian, Denmark-Olar High School
1984	National Merit Scholar, Summer Education Enrichment Program Scholar, Medical College of Georgia
1985	Tai Beta Pi Engineering Honor Society, MIT
1986	Albert G. Hill Award, MIT
1991	Best Research Award for "The Distribution of fluid forces on arterial endothelial cells," American Society of Mechanical Engineers
1997	Merck-UNCF Scholar, Merck-UNCF Postdoctoral Fellowship, Merck, Inc.
2002	Career Development Award, Orthopaedic Research and Education Foundation
2004	Crain's 40 under 40 Laureate, Crain's Business Journal, Chicago, IL
2008	Selected for Who's Who, Black Houston
2008	Selected for "America's Top Surgeons," Consumers' Research Council of America
2008	Leadership Fellows Program, Class of 2008-2009, AAOS
2009	American-British-Canadian (ABC) Fellow, American Orthopaedic Association (AOA)
2009	Mission Specialist Astronaut, STS-129/ULF3 Space Shuttle Atlantis Mission
2010	Finalist, Tuskegee University Presidency Search
2012	Honorary Doctorate of Science, Voorhees College
2012	Honorary Doctorate of Science, St. Paul's College
2013	First Annual Strong Men & Women in Virginia History, Library of Virginia and Dominion Energy
2013	Business/Civic Leadership Forum Fellow, Center for Houston's Future
2014	AICHE MAC Eminent Engineer Award, Georgia Aerospace Inc.
2014	The HistoryMakers
2015	28 Days Game Changers Past & Present, AT&T
2015	At&T's 2015 African American History Calendar

== Non-medical activities and interests ==
- Big Brother for Youth at Risk Counseling Program, Department of Corrections, San Francisco, California
- Tutor for Black Student's Union Tutorial Program, MIT
- National Society of Black Engineers
- American Institute of Chemical Engineering
- Supervising Adult for Cub Scout for Boys, Nashville, Tennessee
- Open Airways Tutor (asthma awareness)
- Proctor for Freshman Dormitory, Harvard University, Cambridge, Massachusetts
- Lay Episcopal Minister (primary responsibility is visiting sick and shut-in members of the church) at St. Edmund's Episcopal Church, Chicago, Illinois, and at St. James Episcopal Church, Houston, Texas

== Personal life ==
Satcher was married to D'Juana Oweta White, MPH, MD, who is a pediatrician, at the First Presbyterian Church in Mt. Vernon, New York on June 28, 1997. They have one daughter and one son. He enjoys running, scuba diving, and reading.

== See also ==
- List of African-American astronauts
