= Chief of the Astronaut Office =

Senior leadership position in NASA

Chief of the Astronaut Office of the National Aeronautics and Space Administration
- Insignia of the National Aeronautics and Space Administration

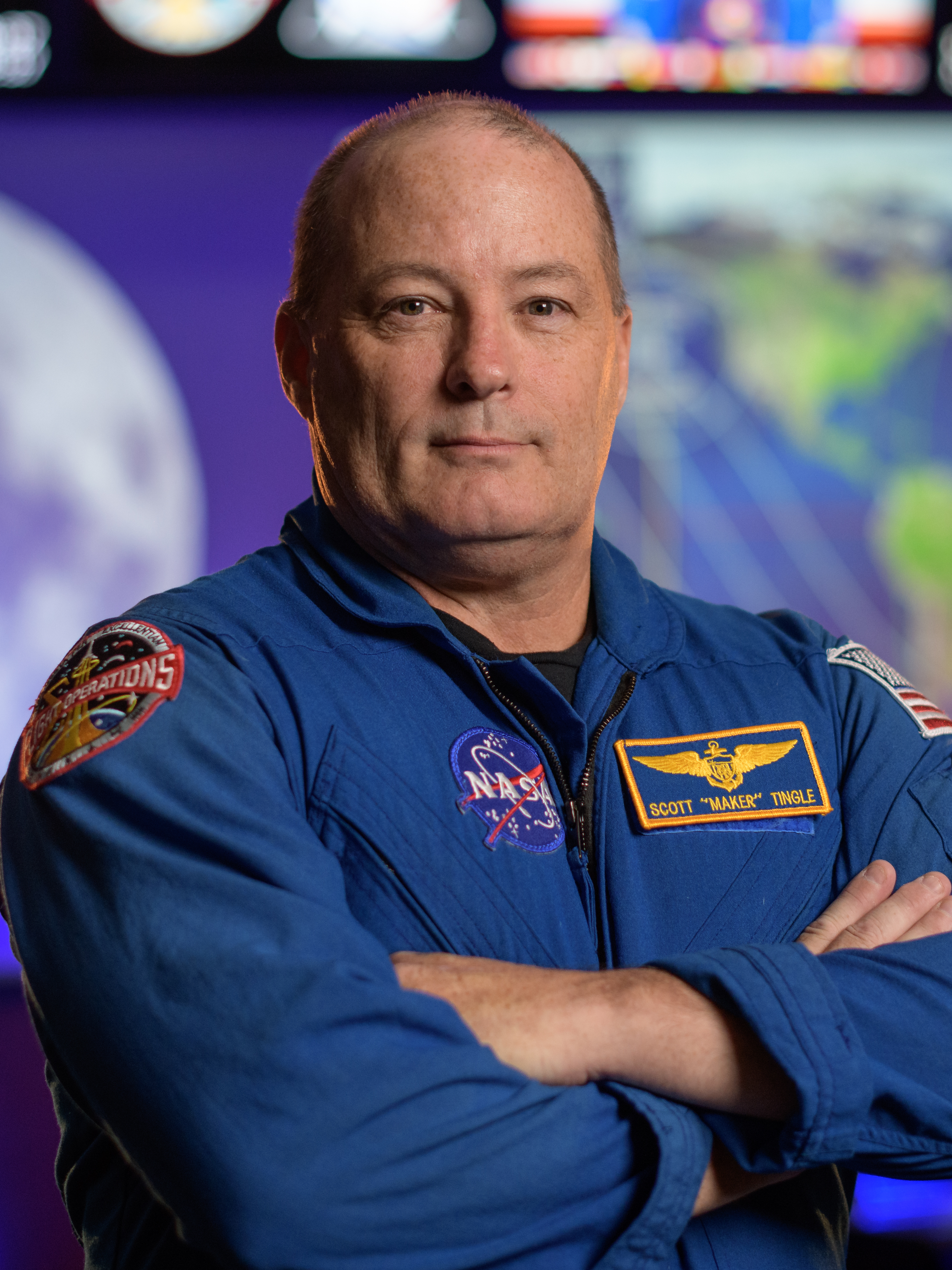
- Incumbent; Scott Tingle since November 4, 2025
- National Aeronautics and Space Administration
- Reports to: Administrator of NASA
- Seat: Johnson Space Center, Houston, Texas
- Term length: No fixed term
- Formation: July 1964; 62 years ago
- First holder: Deke Slayton
- Website: nasa.gov

The chief of the Astronaut Office is the most senior leadership position for active astronauts at the National Aeronautics and Space Administration (NASA). The chief Astronaut serves as head of the NASA Astronaut Corps and is the principal advisor to the NASA administrator on astronaut training and operations. The chief's responsibilities include managing Astronaut Office resources and operations and helping to develop operating concepts and assignments for astronaut flight crew.

== History ==
When Deke Slayton was grounded from the Mercury Seven due to a heart condition, he took on the position of coordinator of Astronaut Activities and informally held the title of "chief astronaut". In this role, he held responsibility for the operation of the astronaut office.

The position of chief of the Astronaut Office was officially created in July 1964, when Alan Shepard was named as the first chief astronaut. His responsibilities included monitoring the coordination, scheduling, and control of all activities involving NASA astronauts. This included monitoring the development and implementation of training programs to assure the flight readiness of pilot and non-pilot personnel for space flights; furnishing pilot evaluations applicable to the design, construction, and operations of spacecraft systems and related equipment; and providing scientific and engineering observations to facilitate mission planning, formulation of operational procedures, and selection and conduct of experiments for each flight.

The chief of the Astronaut Office often returns to active duty once their term is complete.

== List of chief astronauts ==
#	Portrait	Name	Group	Started	Resigned	Deputies	Notes
1		Deke Slayton (1924–1993)	1 (1959)	September 18, 1962	July 8, 1964		Held position of Coordinator of Astronaut Activities and was referred to unofficially as "Chief Astronaut"
2		Alan Shepard (1923–1998)	1 (1959)	July 8, 1964	August 7, 1969		First person to formally have title of Chief of the Astronaut Office
3		Tom Stafford (1930–2024)	2 (1962)	August 7, 1969	June 25, 1971		Stafford held the position while Shepard prepared for and flew Apollo 14.
4		Alan Shepard (1923–1998)	1 (1959)	June 25, 1971	January 14, 1974		
5		John Young (1930–2018)	2 (1962)	January 14, 1974	April 15, 1987	Paul J. Weitz	Acting Chief during STS-1 training was Alan Bean.
6		Dan Brandenstein (1943–)	8 (1978)	April 27, 1987	October 1992	Steven Hawley	Hawley was Acting Chief while Brandenstein prepared for and flew STS-49, the first flight of Space Shuttle Endeavour.
7		Robert Gibson (1946–)	8 (1978)	December 8, 1992	September 6, 1994	Linda Godwin	Gibson handed the position over to Cabana to begin training for STS-71, the first Shuttle docking to Mir.
8		Robert Cabana (1949–)	11 (1985)	September 6, 1994	October 1997	Linda Godwin	Cabana handed the position over to Cockrell to begin training for STS-88, the first International Space Station assembly mission.
9		Kenneth Cockrell (1950–)	13 (1990)	October 1997	October 1998		Cockrell later flew two Shuttle missions.
10		Charles Precourt (1955–)	13 (1990)	October 1998	November 2002	Kent Rominger, Steve Smith	
11		Kent Rominger (1956–)	14 (1992)	November 2002	September 2006	Andy Thomas, Peggy Whitson	
12		Steven W. Lindsey (1960–)	15 (1994)	September 2006	October 2009	Janet Kavandi, Sunita Williams	Lindsey resigned when he was assigned to command STS-133, which at the time was planned to be the final Space Shuttle mission.
13		Peggy Whitson (1960–)	16 (1996)	October 2009	July 2012	Rick Sturckow, Michael Barratt, Bob Behnken, Eric Boe	Whitson was the first woman and first non-pilot to serve as Chief Astronaut. She resigned when she went back on active flight status.
14		Bob Behnken (1970–)	18 (2000)	July 2012	July 2015	Eric Boe	Behnken and Boe both returned to flight status, working on the Commercial Crew Program. Behnken later flew on SpaceX Crew Demo 2.
15		Christopher Cassidy (1970–)	19 (2004)	July 2015	June 2, 2017	Patrick Forrester	Cassidy returned to flight status, and was assigned to Expedition 62/63.
16		Patrick Forrester (1957–)	16 (1996)	June 2, 2017	December 20, 2020	Reid Wiseman, Megan McArthur, Scott Tingle	Forrester took a leave of absence to pursue a personal opportunity outside of NASA.
17		Reid Wiseman (1975–)	20 (2009)	December 20, 2020	February 2, 2023	Andrew Feustel	Stepped down in November 2022 to return to flight rotation. Feustel acted as acting chief between November 2022 and February 2023.
18		Joseph M. Acaba (1967–)	19 (2004)	February 2, 2023	November 4, 2025	Andrew Feustel, Shannon Walker, Nicole Mann	
19		Scott Tingle (1965–)	20 (2009)	November 4, 2025	present		
