= NASA Astronaut Group 19 =

2004 human spaceflight selection of 11 candidates; "The Peacocks"

The Peacocks
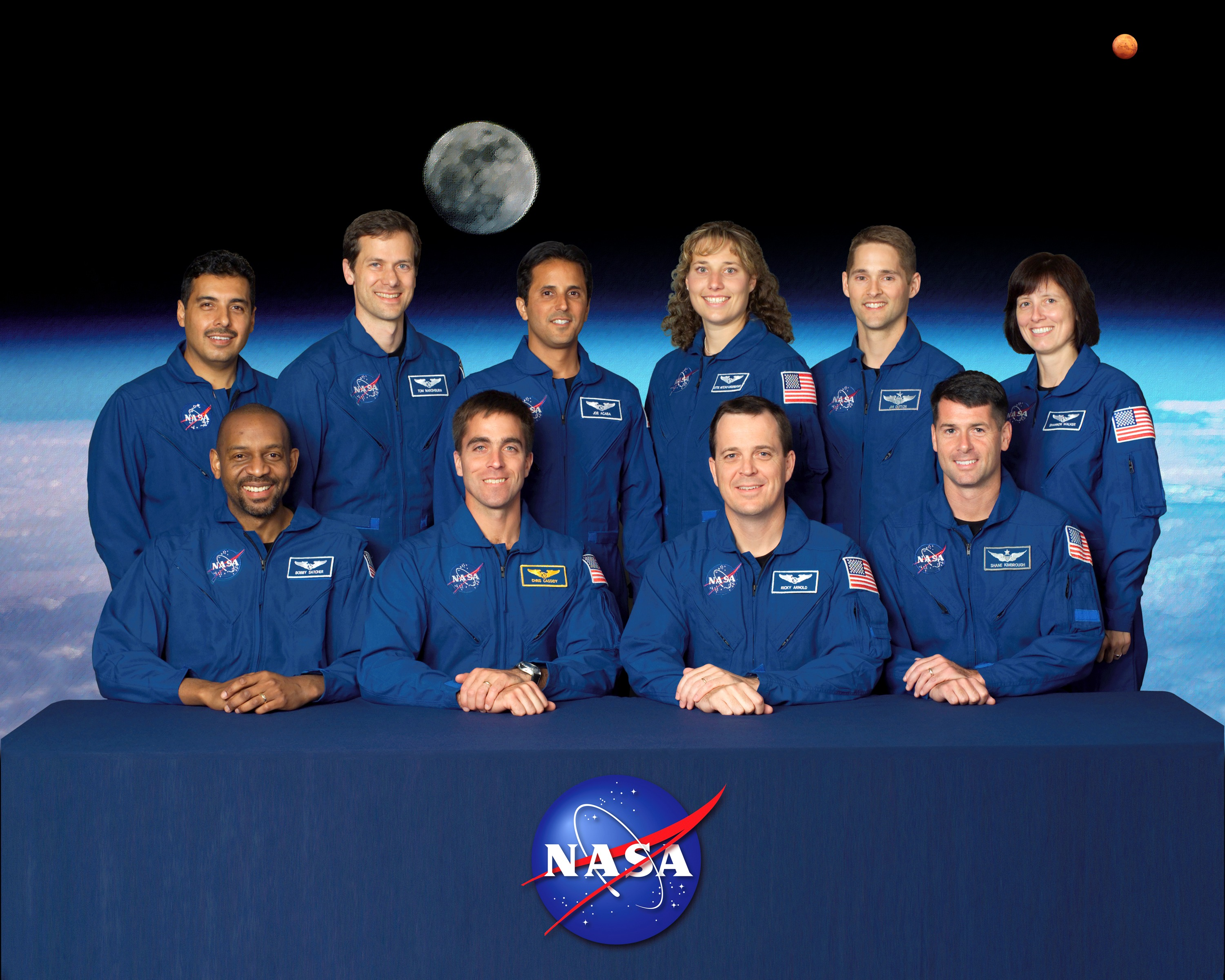
- Group photo, Randolph J. Bresnik is not present
- Year selected: 2004
- Number selected: 11

NASA Astronaut Group 19 (nicknamed "The Peacocks") was a NASA spaceflight team that saw the training of two pilots, six mission specialists, three educator mission specialists to become NASA astronauts. These 11 astronauts began training in 2004. This was the last group to fly the Space Shuttle.

== Pilots ==
- Randolph Bresnik (2 flights)
  - Mission specialist, STS-129 (Atlantis) (Even though Bresnik was selected as a shuttle pilot, he flew this mission as a mission specialist)
  - Soyuz MS-05
    - Flight engineer/Commander, ISS Expedition 52/53
  - Commander, Artemis III – planned
- James Dutton (1 flight)
  - Pilot, STS-131 (Discovery)

== Mission specialists ==
- Christopher Cassidy – Chief of the Astronaut Office 2015-2017 (3 flights)
  - Mission specialist, STS-127 (Endeavour)
  - Soyuz TMA-08M
    - Flight engineer, ISS Expedition 35/36
  - Soyuz MS-16
    - Flight engineer/Commander, ISS Expedition 62/63
- José M. Hernández (1 flight)
  - Mission specialist/Flight engineer, STS-128 (Discovery)
- Robert S. Kimbrough (3 flights)
  - Mission specialist, STS-126 (Endeavour)
  - Soyuz MS-02
    - Flight engineer/Commander, ISS Expedition 49/50
  - Commander, SpaceX Crew-2
    - Flight engineer, Expedition 65/66
- Thomas Marshburn (3 flights)
  - Mission specialist, STS-127 (Endeavour)
  - Soyuz TMA-07M
    - Flight engineer, ISS Expedition 34/35
  - Pilot, SpaceX Crew-3
    - Flight engineer/Commander, ISS Expedition 66/67
- Robert Satcher (1 flight)
  - Mission specialist, STS-129 (Atlantis)
- Shannon Walker (2 flights)
  - Soyuz TMA-19
    - Flight engineer, ISS Expedition 24/25
  - Mission specialist, SpaceX Crew 1
    - Flight engineer/Commander, ISS Expedition 64/65

== Educator mission specialists ==
- Joseph M. Acaba – Chief of the Astronaut Office 2023-2025 (3 flights)
  - Mission specialist, STS-119 (Discovery)
  - Soyuz TMA-04M
    - Flight engineer, ISS Expedition 31/32
  - Soyuz MS-06
    - Flight engineer, ISS Expedition 53/54
- Richard R. Arnold (2 flights)
  - Mission specialist, STS-119 (Discovery)
  - Soyuz MS-08
    - Flight engineer, ISS Expedition 55/56
- Dorothy Metcalf-Lindenburger (1 flight)
  - Mission specialist/Flight engineer, STS-131 (Discovery)

== See also ==
- List of astronauts by selection
