= Ban-Lon =

Trademark for a crimped rayon yarn from Joseph Bancroft & Sons

Ban-Lon (sometimes spelled BanLon or Banlon) is a trademarked, multistrand, continuous-filament synthetic yarn used in the retail clothing industry. It was created in 1954 by Joseph Bancroft & Sons Company, by applying a process for crimping yarn to nylon in order to achieve greater bulk than ordinary yarns. It became popular for outerwear, swimsuits, sweaters and hose. It is frequently associated with 1950s and 1960s American clothing and culture.

Ban-Lon came to be used as a punchline for jokes in films and on television shows in the 1990s. In an episode of NBC's Seinfeld series, when Sid Farkus claims he wears it and there appears to be "some jiggling", Frank Costanza replies that because of his "man breasts" he "wouldn't be caught dead in Ban-Lon". In the film Romy and Michele's High School Reunion, Michele comments, "...how am I gonna impress anybody by selling Ban-Lon smocks at Bargain Mart?"

== See also ==
- Polyester
- Rayon
