= Georgia, Indiana =

- Unincorporated community
- Location within Indiana Location within the United States
- Coordinates: 38°42′36″N 86°34′20″W
- Country: United States
- State: Indiana
- County: Lawrence
- Township: Spice Valley
- Elevation: 650 ft (200 m)
- ZIP code: 47446
- FIPS code: 18-27396
- GNIS feature ID: 450950

Georgia is an unincorporated community in Spice Valley Township, Lawrence County, Indiana.

== Geography ==
Georgia lies 11 miles (18 km) southwest of Bedford, the county seat of Lawrence County. It is southwest of Mitchell, on what was the Baltimore and Ohio Railroad (B&O).

== History ==
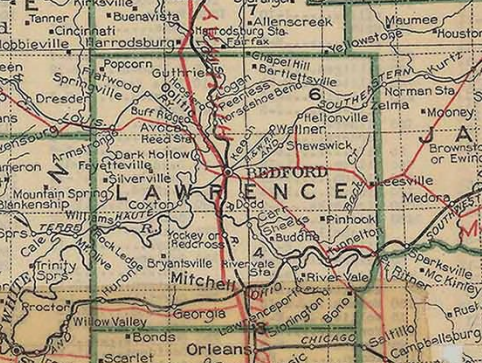
Lawrence County, Indiana, in 1919, showing Georgia in the southern part of the county

Georgia was platted by Alexander and John Case, in 1853. It was established on section 12 of the township. The community was named after the state of Georgia. A post office was established at Georgia in 1857, and remained in operation until it was discontinued in 1917.

The Georgia School was also established in 1857. A number of schools operated in and around Georgia. A new schoolhouse was built in January 1898. The architect and builder was Reuben Bereford, and the school was said at the time to be "the finest country schoolhouse in Lawrence County." A previous Georgia Schoolhouse operated circa 1892.

In 1866, Georgia had a population of 50.

By the early 1900s, Georgia was one of more than 30 towns and hamlets in the county, the others being Armstrong, Avoca, Becks, Bedford, Bono, Bosler, Bryantsville, Buddha, Bartlettsville, Buff Ridge, Carr, Coxton, Dark Hollow, Dodd, Fayetteville, Flatwood, Ft. Ritner, Guthrie, Heltonville, Hoosier, Huron, Indiana, Keach, Lehman, Lawrenceport, Logan, Miles Standish, Mitchell, Oolitic, Peerless, Pinhook, Prosser, Reed, Rock Ledge, Rivervale, Sand Pit, Shawswick, Silverville, Springville, Thornton, Tunnelton, Wallner, Williams, Yockey, and Zelma. The population of Georgia was 26 in 1900, and 42 in 1920.

Georgia's population was 25 in 1940.

== See also ==
- Shawswick, Indiana
