= Flinn Township, Lawrence County, Indiana =

Flinn Township
- Former Township
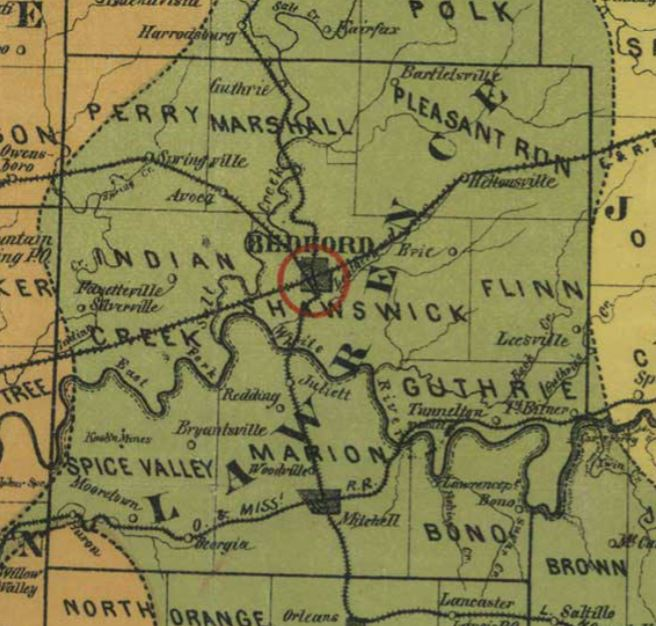
- An 1890 map of Lawrence County, Indiana, depicting Flinn Township (far right, center)
- Coordinates: 38°51′01″N 86°17′40″W
- Country: United States
- State: Indiana
- County: Lawrence

Population (1910)
  - Total: 823

Flinn Township is a former township in Lawrence County, Indiana, United States. The township was dissolved on January 1, 1911.

== History ==
Flinn Township was named after a local family, who settled near the Leesville area in February 1810. The township lasted slightly less than a century, when the board of county commissioners voted to dissolve the township in December 1910. This went into effect on January 1, 1911, and the township was annexed by Shawswick, Guthrie, and Pleasant Run Townships.

== Municipality ==
=== Unincorporated community ===
- Leesville at 38°50′44″N 86°17′04″W

== Demographics ==
Historical population
Census	Pop.	Note	%±
1900	880		—
1910	823		−6.5%
