= Dark Hollow, Indiana =

Unincorporated community in Indiana, U.S.

Dark Hollow
- Former unincorporated community
- Location within Indiana Location within the United States
- Coordinates: 38°53′20″N 86°32′22″W
- Country: United States
- State: Indiana
- County: Lawrence
- Township: Guthrie
- Time zone: UTC5 (Eastern)

Dark Hollow is a former unincorporated community in Lawrence County, Indiana, in the United States.

== Geography ==
Dark Hollow lay west of Oolitic, near Patton Hill. It was in Indian Creek Township. It was 3.9 miles (6.3 km) from Bedford.

== History ==
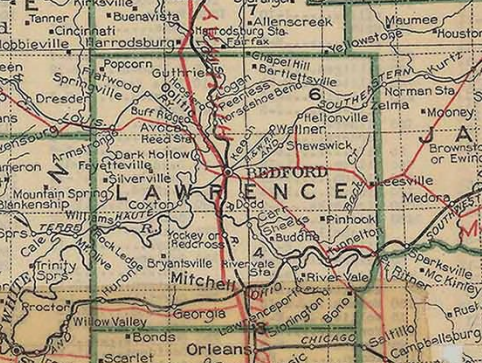
Lawrence County, Indiana, in 1919, showing Dark Hollow in the western part of the county

A post office was established at Dark Hollow in 1893, and remained in operation until it was discontinued in 1901. The community was named after the Dark Hollow Stone Company, which operated a quarry in a shady hollow.

Stone from the Dark Hollow quarry, which was founded in 1877, was used for the Indiana State House. A spur line of the Monon Railroad ran to the community.

Dark Hollow was listed as a town or hamlet, alongside more than 40 other Lawrence County communities, in the History of Lawrence and Monroe Counties, Indiana (1914). Its population was small, being 8 residents in 1900.

By the 1990s, Dark Hollow was considered an abandoned town.

== See also ==
- Zelma, Indiana
