= Marion Township, Lawrence County, Indiana =

Marion Township
- Township
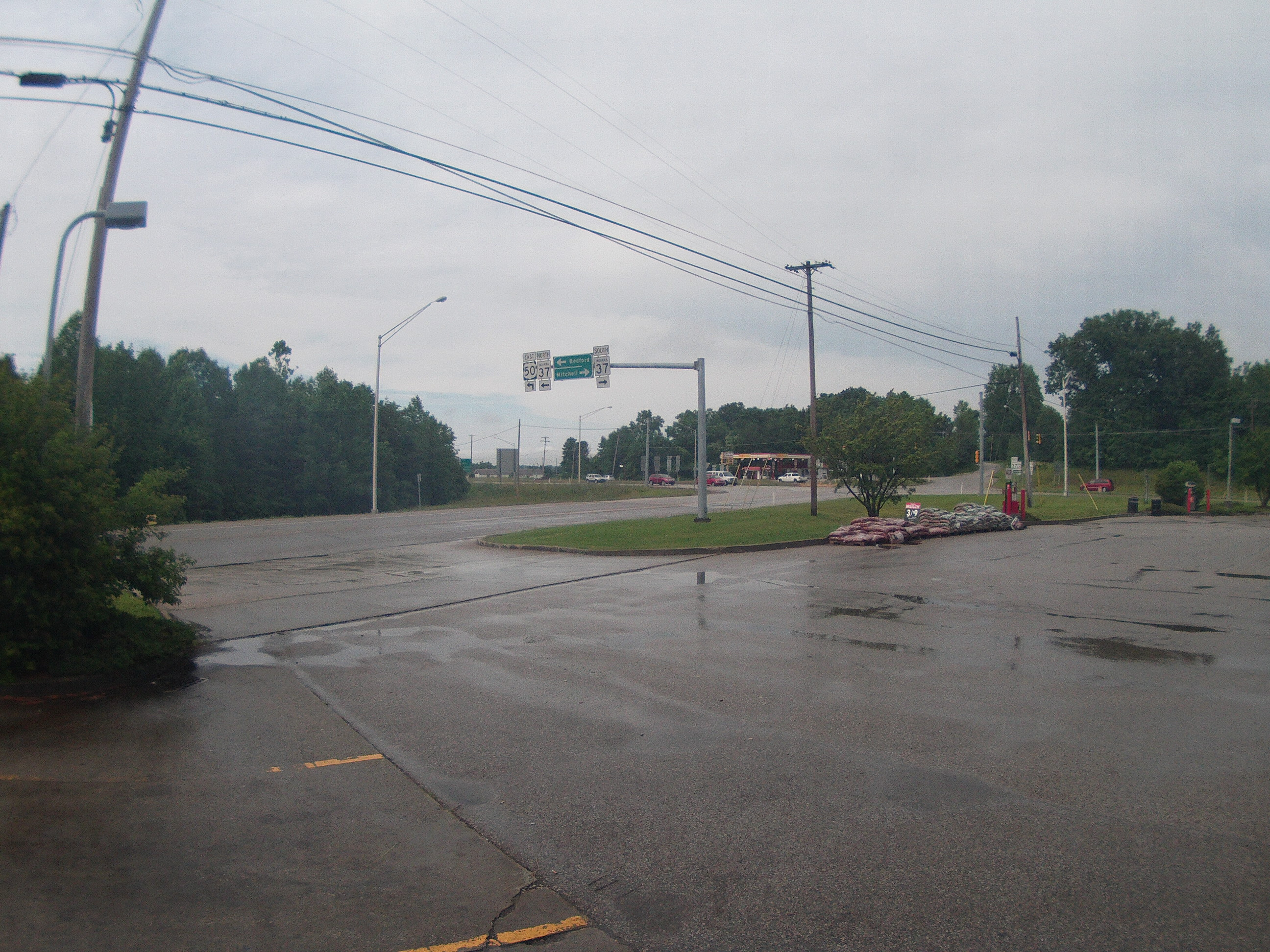
- Intersection of U.S. 50 and State Road 37 from the Speedway gas station in Marion Township

- Location in Lawrence County
- Coordinates: 38°44′59″N 86°28′50″W
- Country: United States
- State: Indiana
- County: Lawrence

Government
  - Type: Indiana township
  - Trustee: Barbara J. Hall

Area
  - Total: 66.82 sq mi (173.1 km^{2})
  - Land: 66.34 sq mi (171.8 km^{2})
  - Water: 0.48 sq mi (1.2 km^{2}) 0.72%
- Elevation: 673 ft (205 m)

Population (2020)
  - Total: 8,853
  - Density: 142.4/sq mi (55.0/km^{2})
- ZIP codes: 47421, 47446, 47452
- GNIS feature ID: 0453609

Marion Township is one of nine townships in Lawrence County, Indiana, United States. As of the 2010 census, its population was 9,449 and it contained 4,218 housing units.

== History ==
Marion Township is named for Francis Marion.

== Geography ==
According to the 2010 census, the township has a total area of 66.82 square miles (173.1 km^{2}), of which 66.34 square miles (171.8 km^{2}) (or 99.28%) is land and 0.48 square miles (1.2 km^{2}) (or 0.72%) is water.

=== Cities, towns, villages ===
- Mitchell

=== Unincorporated towns ===
- Hartleyville at 38.796162°N 86.534993°W
- Rabbitville at 38.768663°N 86.473880°W
- Redding at 38.774496°N 86.503881°W
- Spring Mill Village at 38.735053°N 86.426934°W
- Tarry Park at 38.801440°N 86.50916°W
- Woodville at 38.755885°N 86.484992°W
- Yockey at 38.788107°N 86.493048°W

(This list is based on USGS data and may include former settlements.)

=== Cemeteries ===
The township contains these thirteen cemeteries: Bass, Burton, Connelly, Crest Haven, Erwin, Freedom, Hall, Hamer, Isom, Knott, Red Cross, Sheeks and Thomason.

=== Major highways ===
- U.S. Route 50
- State Road 37
- State Road 60

=== Lakes ===
- Sheeks Lake

=== Landmarks ===
- Spring Mill State Park

== Education ==
- Mitchell Community Schools

Marion Township residents may obtain a free library card from the Mitchell Community Public Library in Mitchell.

== Political districts ==
- Indiana's 9th congressional district
- State House District 62
- State House District 65
- State Senate District 44
