= Tarry =

Tarry is a surname. Notable people with the surname include:

- Chris Tarry (born 1970), Canadian guitarist
- Ellen Tarry (1906–2008), African-American journalist, author and centenarian
- Gaston Tarry (1843–1913), French mathematician
- Jason Tarry (born 1966/67), British retail executive
- Michael Tarry (died 2013), Canadian popular singer
- Sam Tarry (born 1982), British politician
- Sasura Hussein Tarry (elected 2007), Kenyan politician

== See also ==
- McCallum and Tarry (formed 1999), an artistic combination
- Prouhet–Tarry–Escott problem, in mathematics
- Tarry, a minor planet
- Tarry Flynn, a novel by Patrick Kavanagh
- Tarry Park, Indiana, an unincorporated community
- Tarry point, in geometry, named after Gaston Tarry
- Tarry v Ashton, an English court case
