= Indian Creek Township, Lawrence County, Indiana =

Indian Creek Township
- Township
- Location in Lawrence County
- Coordinates: 38°51′59″N 86°36′10″W
- Country: United States
- State: Indiana
- County: Lawrence

Government
  - Type: Indiana township
  - Trustee: Gary Scherschel

Area
  - Total: 38.11 sq mi (98.7 km^{2})
  - Land: 37.98 sq mi (98.4 km^{2})
  - Water: 0.13 sq mi (0.34 km^{2}) 0.34%
- Elevation: 646 ft (197 m)

Population (2020)
  - Total: 2,736
  - Density: 71.8/sq mi (27.7/km^{2})
- ZIP codes: 47421, 47451, 47462, 47470
- GNIS feature ID: 0453425

Indian Creek Township is one of nine townships in Lawrence County, Indiana, United States. As of the 2020 census, its population was 2,736 and it contained 1,176 housing units.

== History ==
Indian Creek Township takes its name from a stream in its northwestern portion. The township was one of the original five townships in Lawrence County. The township boundary originally ran to the East Fork of the White River, including Williams up into the early 20th century.

== Geography ==
According to the 2020 census, the township has a total area of 38.11 square miles (98.7 km^{2}), of which 37.98 square miles (98.4 km^{2}) (or 99.66%) is land and 0.13 square miles (0.34 km^{2}) (or 0.34%) is water.

=== Cities, towns, villages ===
- Oolitic (west edge)

=== Unincorporated towns ===
- Coxton at 38.829495°N 86.561106°W
- Dark Hollow at 38.888939°N 86.539439°W
- Eureka at 38.870883°N 86.562773°W
- Fayetteville at 38.860883°N 86.595274°W
- Patton Hill at 38.900606°N 86.538050°W
- Silverville at 38.85755°N 86.665276°W

(This list is based on USGS data and may include former settlements.)

=== Cemeteries ===
The township contains nine cemeteries: Boone, Bridge, Fayetteville, Ferguson, New Union Church, Old Shiloh, Old Union Church, Pleasant Hill and Waggner.

=== State highways ===
- Indiana State Road 37
- Indiana State Road 158
- Indiana State Road 450
- Indiana State Road 458

== Demographics ==
Historical population
Census	Pop.	Note	%±
1890	1,891		—
1900	2,356		24.6%
1910	2,379		1.0%
1920	1,200		−49.6%
1930	1,600		33.3%
1940	1,448		−9.5%
1950	1,407		−2.8%
1960	1,467		4.3%
1970	1,836		25.2%
1980	2,296		25.1%
1990	2,528		10.1%
2000	2,662		5.3%
2010	2,775		4.2%
2020	2,736		−1.4%

== Education ==
North Lawrence Community Schools serves Indian Creek Township. A charter school, Lawrence County Independent Schools, is located in Fayetteville.

== Fire Department ==
Indian Creek Township is protected by the Indian Creek Volunteer Fire Department (ICVFD). The department's 23 members respond to all types of emergencies, including, but not limited to, fire and medical calls, and are often dispatched as medical first responders when an ambulance is dispatched to the township from the nearby City of Bedford. The department responded to 234 calls in 2012, a record high for the department. ICVFD has mutual aid agreements with all other volunteer fire departments in Lawrence County.

The Indian Creek VFD Station is located in Fayetteville at 38.86103°N 86.59490°W.

== Political districts ==
- Indiana's 9th congressional district
- State House District 62
- State Senate District 44
