= Indiana State Road 158 =

State highway in Indiana, United States

State Road 158
- SR 158 highlighted in red

Route information
- Maintained by INDOT
- Length: 10.169 mi (16.365 km)
- Existed: 1932–present

Major junctions
- West end: Crane Naval Surface Warfare Center
- East end: SR 450 at Bedford

Location
- Country: United States
- State: Indiana
- Counties: Lawrence

Highway system
- Indiana State Highway System; Interstate; US; State; Scenic
← SR 157	→ SR 159

State Road 158 is a short connector route in Lawrence County in the southwest portion of the U.S. state of Indiana.

== Route description ==
State Road 158 begins at the Martin County line, at the east edge of the Crane Naval Surface Warfare Center (which is west of Bedford). The road winds to the east through the small towns of Fayetteville and Eureka. It terminates at State Road 450 on the west edge of Bedford, near U.S. Route 50. It covers a distance of about 10 miles.

== Major intersections ==
The entire route is in Lawrence County.

Location	mi	km	Destinations	Notes
Indian Creek Township	0.000	0.000	Crane Naval Surface Warfare Center	Western terminus of SR 158
Indian Creek Township	8.348	13.435	SR 458 north – Purdue Farm	Southern terminus of SR 458
Bedford	10.169	16.365	SR 450 – Williams, Williams Dam	Eastern terminus of SR 158
1.000 mi = 1.609 km; 1.000 km = 0.621 mi
