= Indiana State Road 446 =

State highway in Indiana, United States

State Road 446
- SR 446 highlighted in red

Route information
- Maintained by INDOT
- Length: 23.550 mi (37.900 km)

Major junctions
- West end: SR 46 in Bloomington
- SR 58 in Pleasant Run Township
- East end: US 50 in Shawswick Township

Location
- Country: United States
- State: Indiana
- Counties: Lawrence; Monroe

Highway system
- Indiana State Highway System; Interstate; US; State; Scenic
← SR 445	→ SR 450

State Road 446 (SR 446) is a short highway in Lawrence and Monroe counties in southern Indiana, United States. Though it is an even-numbered route, it is actually a north–south highway.

== Route description ==
SR 446 connects State Road 46 on the east side of Bloomington with U.S. Route 50 in eastern Lawrence County. It passes over a causeway over Lake Monroe and through the Hoosier National Forest.

== Major intersections ==
County	Location	mi	km	Destinations	Notes
Lawrence	Shawswick Township	0.000	0.000	US 50 – Bedford, Seymour	Eastern terminus of SR 446
Lawrence	Pleasant Run Township	4.094	6.589	SR 58 – Bedford, Columbus	
Monroe	Bloomington	23.550	37.900	SR 46 – Bloomington, Columbus	Western terminus of SR 446
1.000 mi = 1.609 km; 1.000 km = 0.621 mi

== See also ==
- List of state roads in Indiana
- List of highways numbered 446
