= East Oolitic, Indiana =

- Unincorporated community
- Location within Indiana Location within the United States
- Coordinates: 38°53′57″N 86°30′13″W
- Country: United States
- State: Indiana
- County: Lawrence
- Township: Shawswick
- Elevation: 528 ft (161 m)
- ZIP code: 47421
- FIPS code: 18-19936
- GNIS feature ID: 2830449

East Oolitic is an unincorporated community and census-designated place in Shawswick Township, Lawrence County, Indiana.

== History ==
East Oolitic was originally called Spien Kopj, in commemoration of the Battle of Spion Kop in the Second Boer War. East Ooltic was platted in 1900. Oolite is a type of limestone found in the area.

== Geography ==
East Oolitic, Indiana is located in Lawrence County approximately two miles north of Bedford, and one half mile east of Oolitic.

== Demographics ==
The United States Census Bureau first delineated East Oolitic as a census designated place in the 2022 American Community Survey.
