= Silverville, Indiana =

- Unincorporated community
- Location within Indiana Location within the United States
- Coordinates: 38°51′27″N 86°39′55″W
- Country: United States
- State: Indiana
- County: Lawrence
- Township: Indian Creek
- Elevation: 518 ft (158 m)
- ZIP code: 47470
- FIPS code: 18-69804
- GNIS feature ID: 451464

Silverville is an unincorporated community in Indian Creek Township, Lawrence County, Indiana.

== Geography ==
Silverville is 10 miles (16 km) from Bedford, the county seat.

== History ==
A post office was established at Silverville in 1851, and remained in operation until it was discontinued in 1906. Silverville was platted on July 26, 1855.

There are two legends behind the naming of this place. One says that Native American buried silver in a nearby cave. Another states that the land in Silverville was paid for in silver dollars.

In 1890, the population of Silverville was estimated as around 100 residents. By 1920, the population was 89. The population was 115 in 1940.

== See also ==
- Rabbitville, Indiana
