= Dixonville, Indiana =

Dixonville
- Former unincorporated community
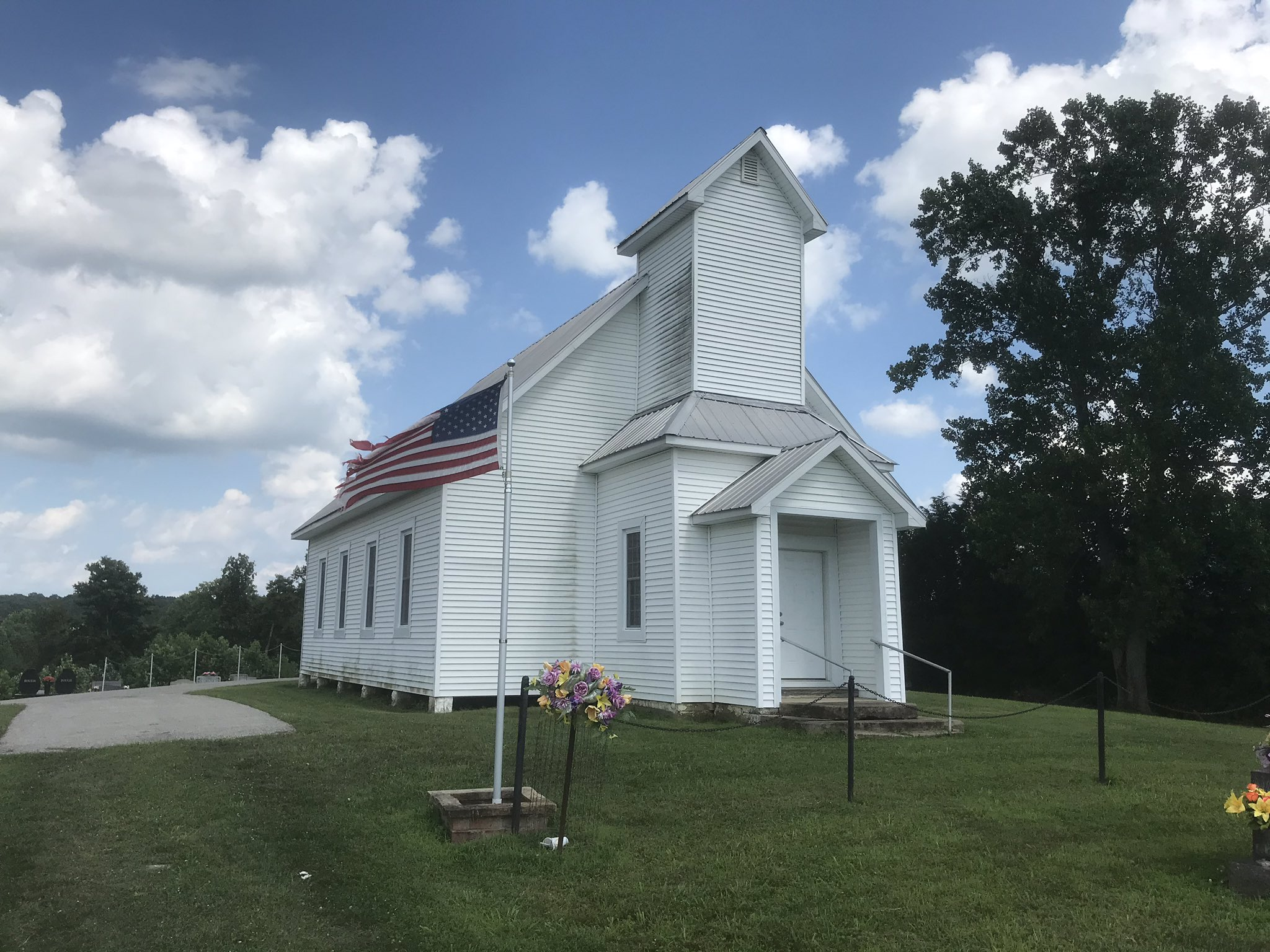
- Dixon Chapel, built in 1894, located in the former community.

- Location within Indiana Location within the United States
- Coordinates: 38°48′08″N 86°17′04″W
- Country: United States
- State: Indiana
- County: Lawrence
- Township: Guthrie
- Time zone: UTC5 (Eastern)
- ZIP code: 47421

Dixonville is a former unincorporated community in Guthrie Township, Lawrence County, Indiana.

== History ==
Dixonville was platted on April 8, 1853, by Thomas and William Dixon. It was platted in the center of section 10, township 4, range 2 east. By the 1950s, it was an abandoned community.
