= Marshall Township, Lawrence County, Indiana =

Marshall Township
- Township
- Location in Lawrence County
- Coordinates: 38°56′34″N 86°30′53″W
- Country: United States
- State: Indiana
- County: Lawrence

Government
  - Type: Indiana township
  - Trustee: Jan Kirk

Area
  - Total: 36.33 sq mi (94.1 km^{2})
  - Land: 36.32 sq mi (94.1 km^{2})
  - Water: 0.01 sq mi (0.026 km^{2}) 0.03%
- Elevation: 495 ft (151 m)

Population (2020)
  - Total: 4,548
  - Density: 128.3/sq mi (49.5/km^{2})
- ZIP codes: 47420, 47421, 47451, 47462
- GNIS feature ID: 0453615

Marshall Township is one of nine townships in Lawrence County, Indiana, United States. As of the 2010 census, its population was 4,660 and it contained 2,038 housing units.

== History ==
Marshall Township was named for John Marshall, fourth Chief Justice of the United States.

== Geography ==
According to the 2010 census, the township has a total area of 36.33 square miles (94.1 km^{2}), of which 36.32 square miles (94.1 km^{2}) (or 99.97%) is land and 0.01 square miles (0.026 km^{2}) (or 0.03%) is water.

=== Unincorporated towns ===
- Avoca at 38.911994°N 86.547773°W
- Coveyville at 38.973383°N 86.472494°W
- Guthrie at 38.976716°N 86.509161°W
- Judah at 38.960882°N 86.537218°W
- Murdock at 38.909772°N 86.508327°W
- Needmore at 38.927272°N 86.529995°W
- Peerless at 38.924494°N 86.503327°W
- Stemm at 38.956994°N 86.504161°W
- Thornton at 38.916717°N 86.501383°W

(This list is based on USGS data and may include former settlements.)

=== Cemeteries ===
The township contains these six cemeteries: Anderson, Brinegar, Hayes, Hopkins, Mount Zion and Perkins.

=== Marshall Township Park ===
The Avoca State Fish Hatchery was built in 1819 and first served as a grist mill until 1919, when it was purchased by the DNR, who began building ponds in 1923. The Hatchery stocked Indiana's waters with fish for years until it was decommissioned by the DNR in 2013 and fell into disrepair.

Bedford Mayor Shawna Girgis, requested Bedford Park Director, Barry Jeskewich, to find a solution to restore this historical location for Lawrence County. Barry Jeskewich partnered with James Farmer, Indiana University Sustaining Hoosier Communities to obtained a grant to preserve this beloved green space for the surrounding community. The grant was awarded to the newly formed Avoca Park and Recreation board in 2019. Avoca State Fish Hatchery was renamed Marshall Township Park and is now in the hands of board and the local community.

“IU Farmer-Jeskewich Final Report”

=== Major highways ===
- Indiana State Road 37
- Indiana State Road 54

== School districts ==
- North Lawrence Community Schools
- Lawrence County Independent School

== Political districts ==
- Indiana's 4th congressional district
- State House District 65
- State Senate District 44
