= Palestine, Lawrence County, Indiana =

Palestine, Indiana
- Extinct town
- Location within Indiana Location within the United States
- Coordinates: 38°48′18″N 86°27′44″W
- Country: United States
- State: Indiana
- County: Lawrence
- Township: Shawswick
- Elevation: 492 ft (150 m)
- ZIP code: 47421

Palestine is an abandoned city in Shawswick Township, Lawrence County, Indiana. Palestine was the original county seat of Lawrence County from 1818 to 1825, when Bedford took the position.

== History ==
Palestine was founded on May 25, 1818, by Benjamin and Ezekiel Blackwell. After maintaining a stable population for quite some time, Palestine was suggested to become the new state capital, as being situated on a high bluff over the White River. Palestine lost the election to Indianapolis later in the next year. The courthouse at Palestine was erected in January 1819. The father of Joseph A. Wright, a former governor of Indiana, cut and laid the stone for the foundation. As one of the most flourishing towns in Southern Indiana, the city had a population of 600–700 in the 1820 United States census. In a trial in between 1823 and 1824, slavery was allowed in the city of Palestine. Residing in Palestine, Joseph Glover was the first county sheriff, who brought the first clock into the county. The city of Palestine was plagued by malaria, leading to a steep decline in population over the next decade. Shortly afterwards, in 1825, the county seat was relocated to the city of Bedford, where the courthouse stands today.
