= Indiana State Road 458 =

State highway in Indiana, United States

State Road 458
- SR 458 highlighted in red

Route information
- Maintained by INDOT
- Length: 1.138 mi (1.831 km)

Major junctions
- North end: Purdue Farm Road in Bedford
- South end: SR 158 in Bedford

Location
- Country: United States
- State: Indiana

Highway system
- Indiana State Highway System; Interstate; US; State; Scenic
← SR 450	→ SR 462

State Road 458 is a short one-mile (1.6 km) route in Lawrence County.

== Route description ==
State Road 458 begins at State Road 158 about a mile west of Bedford and runs directly north. It passes Lena Carver Road on the left, then Dark Hollow Road on the right, before terminating at Purdue Farm Road. It connects State Road 158 with the Dark Hollow community.

== History ==
SR 458 was signed SR 158, before SR 58 was rerouted to its current location.

== Major intersections ==
The entire route is in Indian Creek Township, Lawrence County.

mi	km	Destinations	Notes
0.00	0.00	SR 158 – Bedford	Southern terminus of SR 458
1.138	1.831	Purdue Farm Road	Northern terminus of SR 458
1.000 mi = 1.609 km; 1.000 km = 0.621 mi
