= Eureka, Indiana =

Eureka, Indiana may refer to:

- Eureka, Lawrence County, Indiana
- Eureka, Spencer County, Indiana
