= Tarry Park, Indiana =

- Unincorporated community
- Location within Indiana Location within the United States
- Coordinates: 38°48′05″N 86°30′33″W
- Country: United States
- State: Indiana
- County: Lawrence
- Township: Marion
- Elevation: 600 ft (180 m)
- ZIP code: 47421
- FIPS code: 18-74960
- GNIS feature ID: 451540

Tarry Park, formerly known as Juliett and Red Cross Park, is an unincorporated community in Marion Township, Lawrence County, Indiana.

== History ==
Tarry Park was platted in 1850 as Juliett. The post office in Tarry Park, under the name of "Yocky", was established on January 20, 1880, and closed on November 16, 1886. At one point, it was also known as "Red Cross Park", because of Joseph Gardner donating near the area to the International Red Cross Society. The present name of this place is for Gardner's home.
