= Rabbitville, Indiana =

- Unincorporated community
- Location within Indiana Location within the United States
- Coordinates: 38°46′07″N 86°28′26″W
- Country: United States
- State: Indiana
- County: Lawrence
- Township: Marion
- Elevation: 617 ft (188 m)
- ZIP code: 47446
- FIPS code: 18-62595
- GNIS feature ID: 441711

Rabbitville is an unincorporated community in Marion Township, Lawrence County, Indiana.

== History ==
Rabbitville contained a post office from 1895 until 1897. The community was originally known as Becks; the Monon Railroad station here no longer exists.

== See also ==
- Zelma, Indiana
