= Tunnelton, Indiana =

- Census-designated place
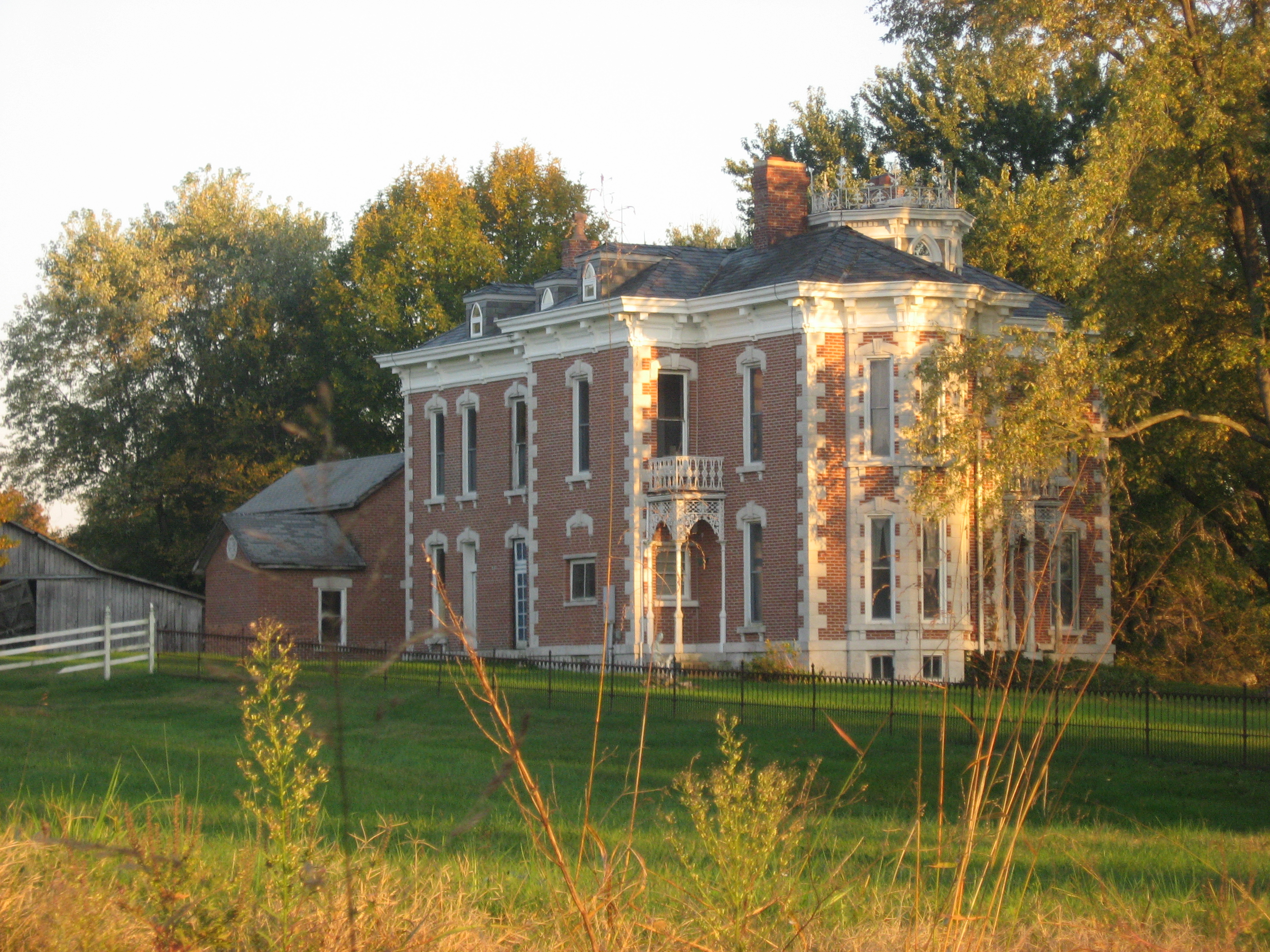
- Alfred H. Guthrie Mansion (1879) in Tunnelton

- Location within Indiana Location within the United States
- Coordinates: 38°46′23″N 86°20′28″W
- Country: United States
- State: Indiana
- County: Lawrence
- Township: Guthrie
- Elevation: 643 ft (196 m)
- ZIP code: 47467
- FIPS code: 18-76742
- GNIS feature ID: 2830455

Tunnelton is a census-designated place in Guthrie Township, Lawrence County, Indiana.

== History ==
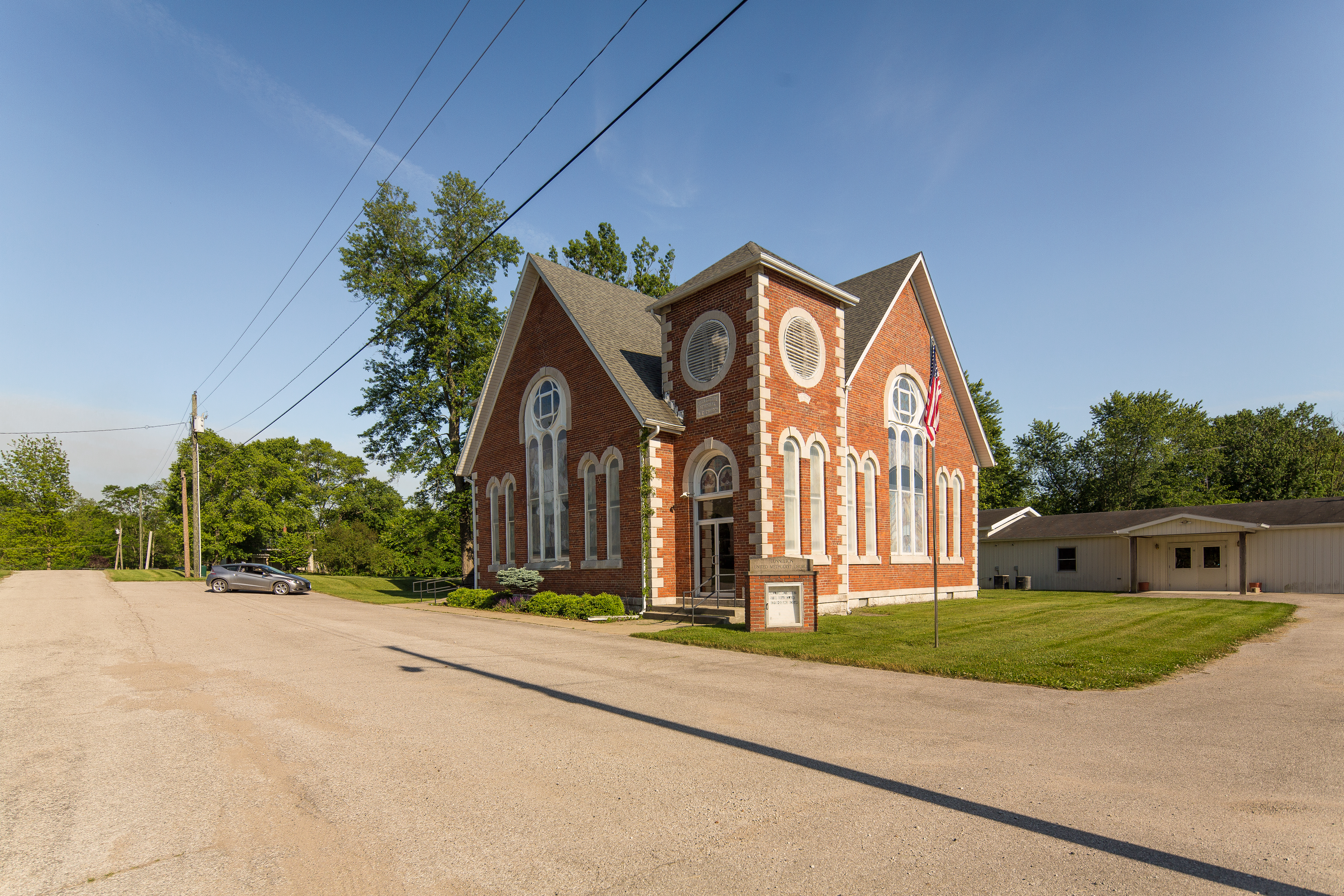
Tunnelton, Indiana

Tunnelton was platted in 1859. Before Tunnelton was platted, the Tunnelton United Methodist Church was platted in 1816 by Thomas Milligan, the first minister in Lawrence County who also served all of Southern Indiana. The church itself, however, was built in 1891. The first schoolhouse was built in 1881, a large two-story frame building. In 1910 a brick school was built, housing grade school and high school. In 1929 it was remodeled and later modernized. The Tunnelton High School had 250 to 300 in attendance. In 1957 a large, new gymnasium was completed. Now the school is abandoned. Its name commemorates local tunnels which had recently been completed on the railroad. The Tunnelton post office opened in 1860 and the first Postmaster from 1860 to 1881 was Alfred Guthrie who also owned the town's General Store and was an agent of the B&O railroad. The second Postmaster was M.D., "Doc" Guthrie who served from 1881 to 1885 he was the town's physician. On February 10, 1882, an ambush (dubbed the Tunnelton Massacre) occurred. Sometime during the 1880s the town had a tavern alongside the railroad. An old small brick building in town which now is privately owned, was used during the Underground Railroad.

=== The Big Tunnel ===
The town's namesake comes from The Big Tunnel, a 1,731 ft. long tunnel that was completed on April 15, 1857, just two years before Tunnelton was laid out, or platted. The tunnel was constructed for the Ohio and Mississippi Railway but is now controlled by CSX Transportation. At other points in time, it was controlled by the Chesapeake and Ohio Railway, as well as the Baltimore and Ohio Railroad. In 1898, the tunnel was shortened and brick lined. Then, the following year, in 1899, a 1700 ft companion tunnel, dubbed as The Little Tunnel, was turned into a cut. The tunnel is also known by the locals as "The Tunnelton Tunnel". It is known as "Ritner Tunnel", mainly to CSX transportation.

== Demographics ==
Historical population
Census	Pop.	Note	%±
2023 (est.)	104

The United States Census Bureau defined Tunnelton as a census designated place in the 2022 American Community Survey.
