= Helton–Mayo Farm =

- U.S. National Register of Historic Places
- U.S. Historic district
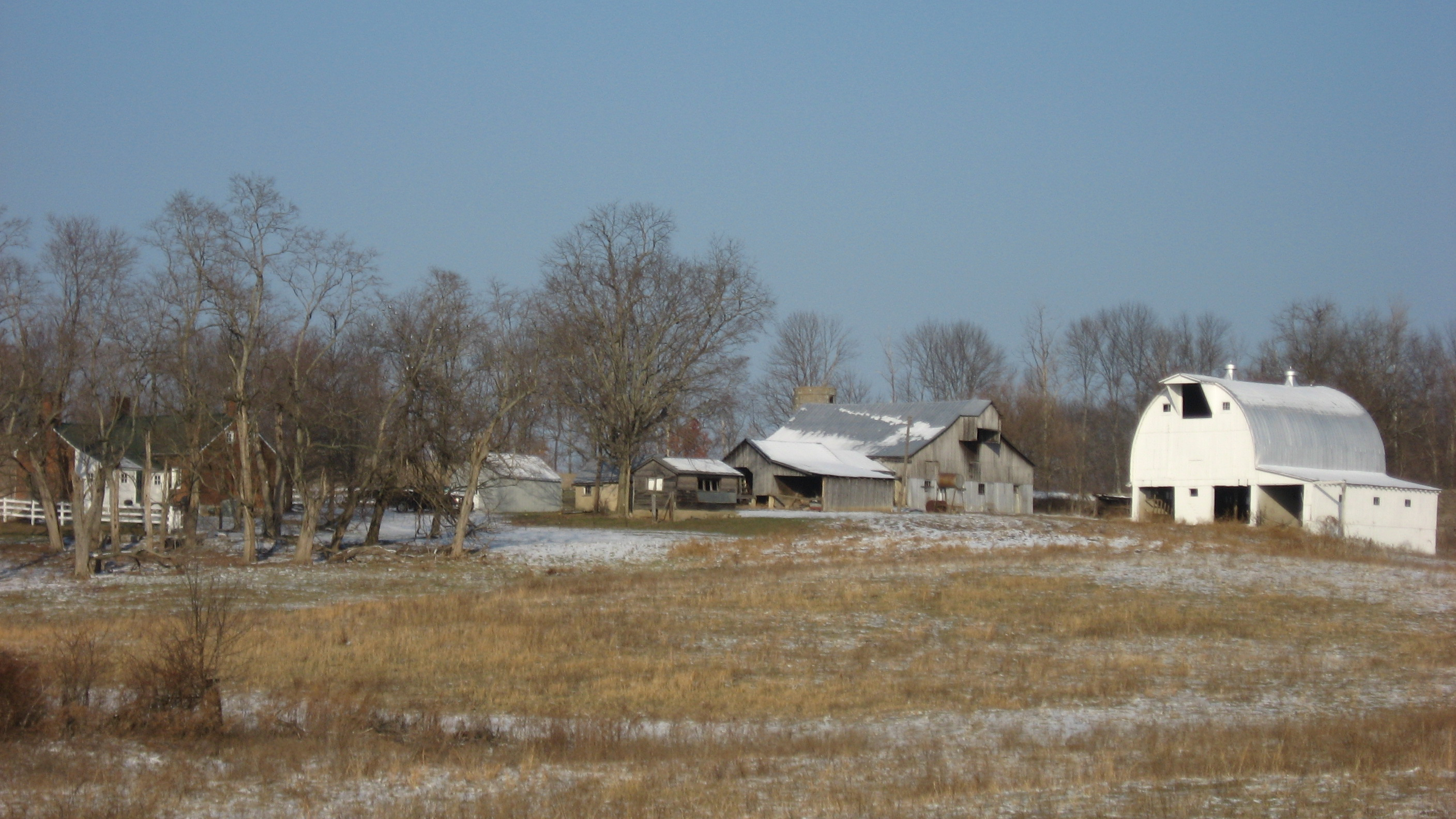
- Helton–Mayo Farm, December 2010

- Location within Indiana Location within the United States
- Location: Junction of Boyd Ln. and State Road 58, northeast of Bedford in Shawswick Township, Lawrence County, Indiana
- Coordinates: 38°53′11″N 86°27′05″W
- Area: 13 acres (5.3 ha)
- Built: c. 1837
- Architectural style: Federal, Hall and Parlor
- NRHP reference No.: 95000709
- Added to NRHP: June 9, 1995

Helton–Mayo Farm is a historic farm and national historic district located in Shawswick Township, Lawrence County, Indiana. The house was built about 1837, and is a 1 1/2-story Federal style, hall and parlor plan brick dwelling. It has a side-gabled roof and rear ell. Also on the property are the contributing Midwest triple portal barn (c. 1835–1845), wellhouse, corn crib, buggy shed, garage (1920s), and round roofed barn (1950).

It was listed in the National Register of Historic Places in 1995.
