= Judah, Indiana =

- Census-designated place
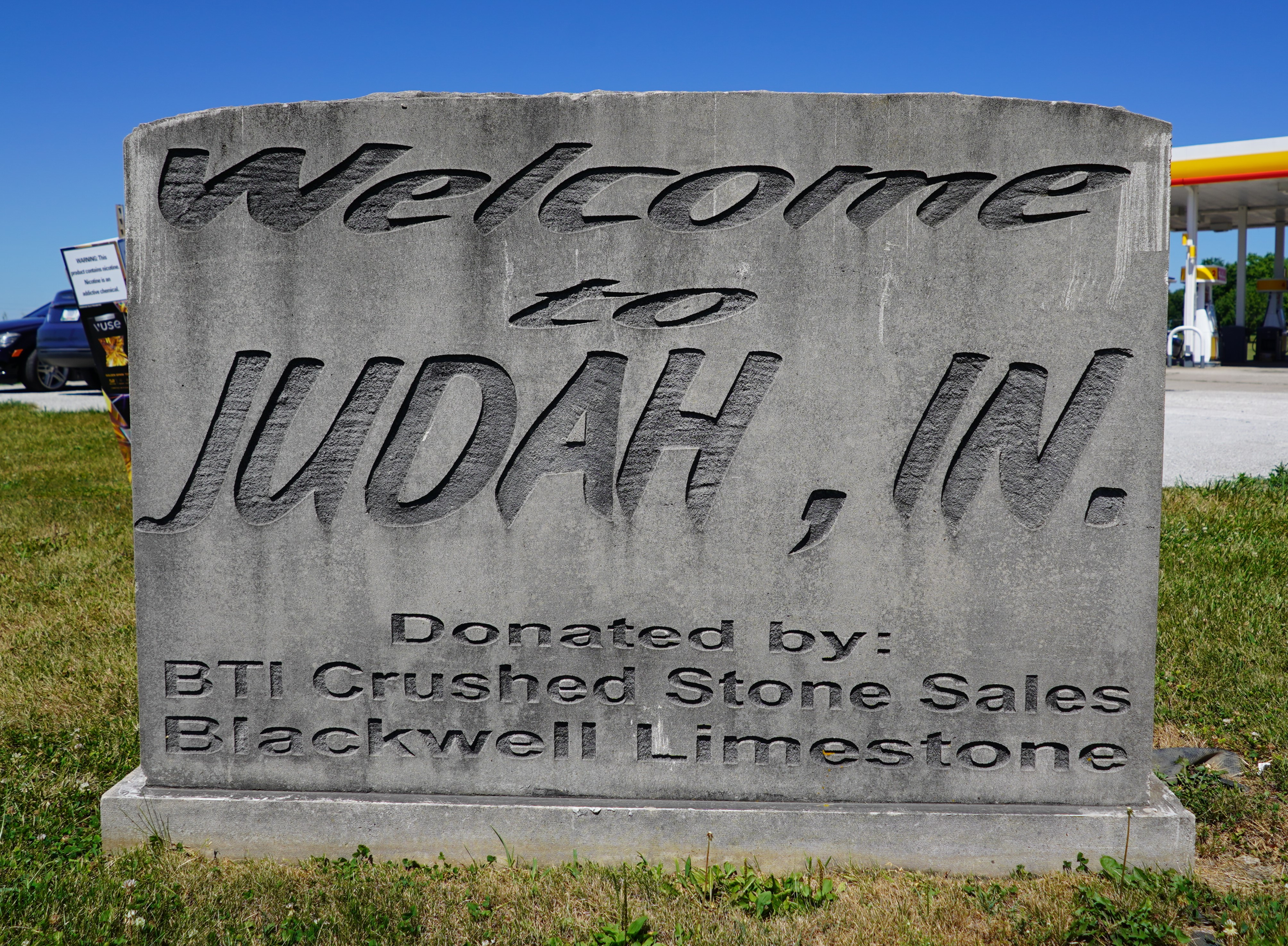
- Judah, Indiana

- Location within Indiana Location within the United States
- Coordinates: 38°57′35″N 86°32′33″W
- Country: United States
- State: Indiana
- County: Lawrence
- Township: Marshall
- Named for: Local school
- Elevation: 653 ft (199 m)
- Time zone: UTC−05:00 (EST)
  - Summer (DST): UTC−04:00 (EDT)
- ZIP code: 47421
- FIPS code: 18-39042
- GNIS feature ID: 2830452

Judah is a census-designated place in Marshall Township, Lawrence County, Indiana, United States.

Judah was named from the presence of the Judah School, established in 1882.

== Demographics ==
The United States Census Bureau delineated Judah as a census designated place in the 2022 American Community Survey.
