= Needmore, Lawrence County, Indiana =

Needmore, Indiana
- Census-designated place
- Location within Indiana Location within the United States
- Coordinates: 38°55′36″N 86°31′35″W
- Country: United States
- State: Indiana
- County: Lawrence
- Township: Marshall
- Elevation: 653 ft (199 m)
- ZIP code: 47421
- FIPS code: 18-52200
- GNIS feature ID: 2830454

Needmore is a Census-designated place in Marshall Township, Lawrence County, Indiana.

== History ==
Tradition has it that Needmore was so named because early settlers there were always in need of food.

== Demographics ==
The United States Census Bureau defined Needmore as a census designated place in the 2022 American Community Survey.
