= Coveyville, Indiana =

- Unincorporated community
- Location within Indiana Location within the United States
- Coordinates: 38°58′24″N 86°28′21″W
- Country: United States
- State: Indiana
- County: Lawrence
- Township: Marshall
- Elevation: 686 ft (209 m)
- ZIP code: 47421
- FIPS code: 18-15472
- GNIS feature ID: 450809

Coveyville is an unincorporated community in Marshall Township, Lawrence County, Indiana.

== History ==
It was originally named Goat's Run. The Coveyville name honors the Covey family, who lived in the area.
