= Peerless, Indiana =

- Unincorporated community
- Location within Indiana Location within the United States
- Coordinates: 38°55′28″N 86°30′12″W
- Country: United States
- State: Indiana
- County: Lawrence
- Township: Marshall
- Elevation: 558 ft (170 m)
- ZIP code: 47421
- FIPS code: 18-58590
- GNIS feature ID: 451325

Peerless is an unincorporated community in Marshall Township, Lawrence County, Indiana.

== History ==
Peerless was platted in 1891. It took its name after a nearby quarry of the same name. A post office opened at Peerless in 1894, and remained in operation until it was discontinued in 1932.
