= Hartleyville, Indiana =

- Unincorporated community
- Location within Indiana Location within the United States
- Coordinates: 38°47′46″N 86°32′06″W
- Country: United States
- State: Indiana
- County: Lawrence
- Township: Marion
- Elevation: 617 ft (188 m)
- ZIP code: 47421
- FIPS code: 18-32278
- GNIS feature ID: 451018

Hartleyville is an unincorporated community in Marion Township, Lawrence County, Indiana.

Hartleyville was named for its founder, Charles Hartley.
