= Fort Ritner, Indiana =

- Unincorporated community
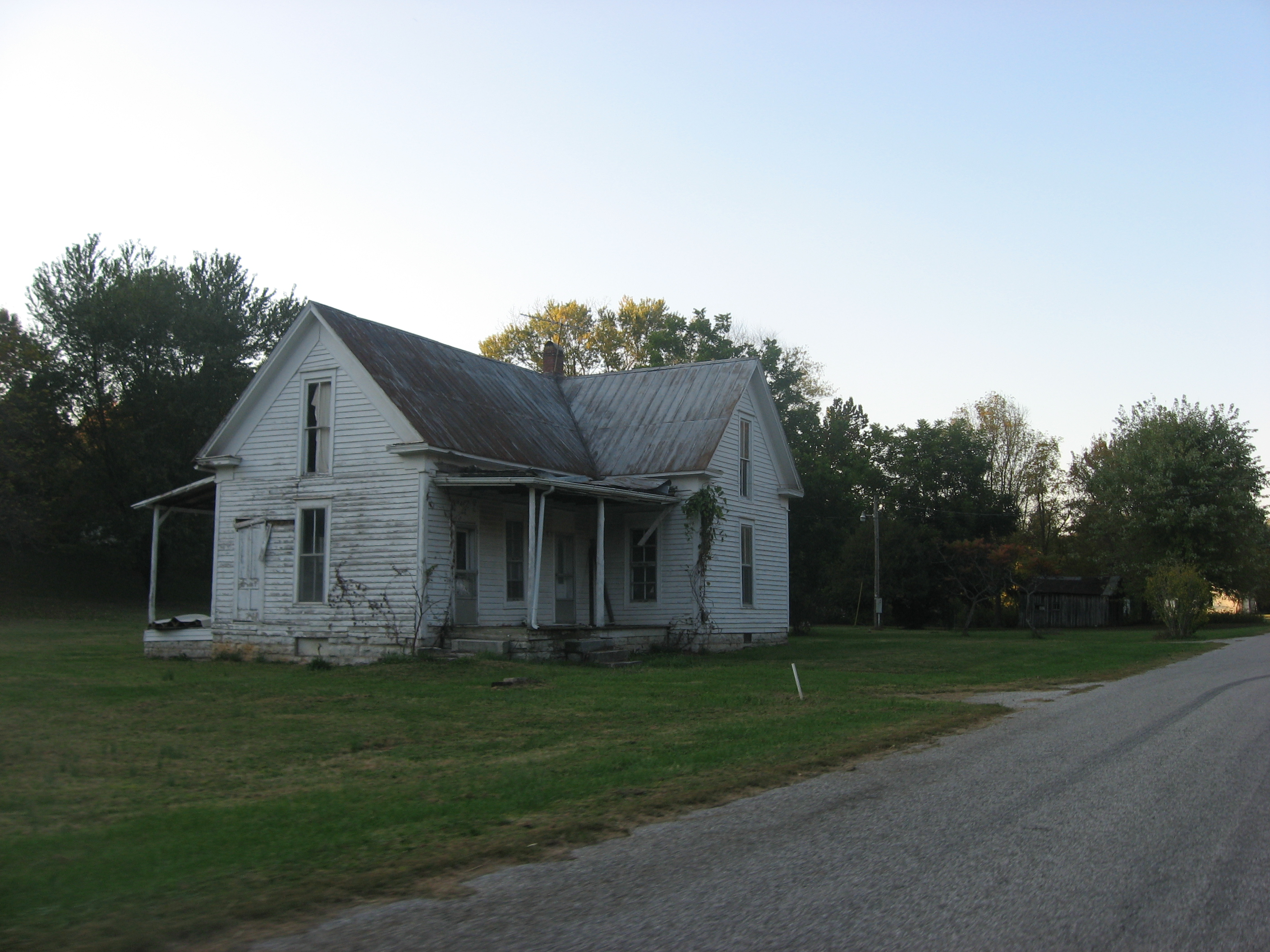
- A typical house in the community

- Location within Indiana Location within the United States
- Coordinates: 38°46′23″N 86°16′52″W
- Country: United States
- State: Indiana
- County: Lawrence
- Township: Guthrie
- Elevation: 515 ft (157 m)
- ZIP code: 47430
- FIPS code: 18-24268
- GNIS feature ID: 434688

Fort Ritner is an unincorporated community in Guthrie Township, Lawrence County, Indiana.

== History ==
Fort Ritner was platted in 1857. It was named for Michael Ritner, a railroad employee who oversaw construction on the nearby tunnel.
