= Pinhook, Lawrence County, Indiana =

Pinhook, Indiana
- Unincorporated community
- Location within Indiana Location within the United States
- Coordinates: 38°48′55″N 86°21′23″W
- Country: United States
- State: Indiana
- County: Lawrence
- Township: Guthrie
- Elevation: 686 ft (209 m)
- ZIP code: 47421
- FIPS code: 18-60120
- GNIS feature ID: 441169

Pinhook is a small unincorporated farming community in Guthrie Township, Lawrence County, Indiana. It consists of two churches (Pinhook Church of Christ and Pinhook Christian Church), a cemetery, and several small farms and homesteads.

== Etymology ==
Two legends describe how Pinhook got its unique name. One states that because the roads leading to it are quite curvy, they reminded people of hooked pins.

The other states that the local general store, around 1900, had lost its liquor license, and in order to keep serving alcohol hooked pins around drink glasses. The proprietor would then sell these "Pin-Hooked" glasses, and throw in a drink for good measure.
