= Erie, Lawrence County, Indiana =

Erie, Indiana
- Unincorporated community
- Location within Indiana Location within the United States
- Coordinates: 38°52′57″N 86°22′53″W
- Country: United States
- State: Indiana
- County: Lawrence
- Township: Shawswick
- Elevation: 699 ft (213 m)
- ZIP code: 47421
- FIPS code: 18-21390
- GNIS feature ID: 450894

Erie is an unincorporated community in Shawswick Township, Lawrence County, Indiana.

== History ==
A post office was established at Erie in 1864, and remained in operation until it was discontinued in 1900. The community was named after the Erie people. Originally, the name of the community was Enterprise, but was changed to Erie in 1867.
