= Coxton, Indiana =

- Unincorporated community
- Location within Indiana Location within the United States
- Coordinates: 38°49′46″N 86°33′40″W
- Country: United States
- State: Indiana
- County: Lawrence
- Township: Indian Creek
- Elevation: 512 ft (156 m)
- ZIP code: 47421
- FIPS code: 18-15550
- GNIS feature ID: 450811

Coxton is an unincorporated community in Indian Creek Township, Lawrence County, Indiana. Coxton was the site of a railroad station located between Bedford and Williams. Coxton was also the site of a school and post office. It was named for Henry Cox, who helped secure the railway line for the Evansville and Richmond Railroad. It was previously known as Haystown.

== Geography ==
Coxton lies 4 miles (6 km) southwest of Bedford, the county seat of Lawrence County. It was formerly on the Chicago, Terre Haute and Southeastern Railway.

== History ==
Coxton had its start by the building of the railroad through that territory. The village began as a railway station. Coxton was the stop between Williams and Bedford.

Coxton was named for Henry Cox, who helped procure the right of way for the Evansville and Richmond Railroad in 1890. Railroad officials similarly honored Jacob Bossett and Bart Williams with station names along the same line. Haystown was an alternate name for the area, in use prior to Coxton.

A post office was established at Coxton in 1890, and remained in operation until it was discontinued in 1903.

The Coxton School was a one-room schoolhouse serving first through eighth grade students, and was one of several in Indian Creek Township (others included Tripleten, Pierce, and Pace School). The school was open circa 1915, and was closed ("discontinued") in 1930.

Coxton's population was 30 in 1940. By the 1990s, Coxton was considered an abandoned community.

== See also ==
- Guthrie, Indiana
