= Lawrence County, Indiana =

County in Indiana, United States

- County
- Flag Seal

- Location in the state of Indiana

- Indiana's location in the U.S.
- Coordinates: 38°48′N 86°33′W
- Country: United States
- State: Indiana
- Founded: 1818
- Named for: James Lawrence
- County seat: Bedford
- Largest city: Bedford (population and area)
- Incorporated Municipalities: Three Cities and Towns: Bedford (city); Mitchell (city); Oolitic (town)

Government
  - Type: County
  - Body: Board of Commissioners

Area
  - Total: 451.93 sq mi (1,170.5 km^{2})
  - Land: 449.17 sq mi (1,163.3 km^{2})
  - Water: 2.76 sq mi (7.1 km^{2})
  - Rank: 20th largest county in Indiana
- Elevation: 502 ft (153 m)

Population (2020)
  - Total: 45,011
  - Estimate (2025): 45,568 ▲
  - Rank: 33rd largest county in Indiana
  - Density: 100.21/sq mi (38.691/km^{2})
- Time zone: UTC−5 (Eastern)
  - Summer (DST): UTC−4 (Eastern)
- ZIP Codes: 47264, 47420-47421, 47436-47437, 47446, 47451, 47462, 47467, 47470
- Area code: 812 and 930
- Congressional district: 9th
- Indiana Senate district: 44th
- Indiana House of Representatives districts: 65th and 73rd
- FIPS code: 18-093
- GNIS feature ID: 0451703
- Website: lawrencecounty.in.gov
- Indiana county number 47

Lawrence County is a county located in the U.S. state of Indiana. As of 2020, the population was 45,011. The county seat is Bedford. Lawrence County comprises the Bedford, IN Micropolitan Statistical Area.

== History ==
Until the Battle of Tippecanoe, the general area of Lawrence County was populated primarily by Native Americans. The first trace of white settlement in Lawrence County was near Leesville; however, Bono was the first white settlement in the county. Lawrence County was formed in 1818 by subdividing Orange County. The English name refers to Captain James Lawrence, who uttered the famous words "Don't give up the ship." after being mortally wounded during the War of 1812. Prior to Lawrence County's creation, it was organized as "Leatherwood Township." On March 11, 1818, the county commissioners Ambrose Carlton, Thomas Beagley, and James Stotts, met at the home of James Gregory. On the third day of this session, the commissioners proceeded to divide the county into two civil townships: Shawswick and Spice Valley. Early in 1819, the board adopted a seal for Lawrence County, which was designed with a harp, a plow, three sheaves of wheat, a pair of scales, and a weathercock on top. The first county seat of Lawrence County was located at Palestine, situated on a high bluff near the East Fork of the White River. 276 lots were laid out in Palestine, which were advertised for sale on May 25, 1818. Steps were immediately taken to build a courthouse and a jail. The first courthouse of the county was log and erected in the spring of 1818. This courthouse was temporary, and steps to construct a permanent courthouse began in November 1818. It was first designed in octagonal form, with brick walls, a stone foundation, with 45 windows and to be two stories tall. The courthouse was finished in the autumn of 1821, at a total cost of $5,500 (1821 USD). After much disease, and a tornado that swept through the area in 1820, the county approved the relocation of the county seat on February 9, 1825. The name "Bedford" was selected for the new county seat by Joseph Rawlins, a local businessman, after Bedford County, Virginia. The town was laid out on March 30, 1825, and current residents of Palestine were offered a lot in Bedford. The county records were hauled from Palestine to Bedford by Richard Evans. In early 1825, a temporary log courthouse was erected at Bedford. In 1831, the board of commissioners took up the matter of building a more suitable courthouse and advertised bids for a courthouse similar to the one at Salem in May, and there obtained complete plans of that structure. The old buildings at Palestine were sold, and the proceeds were to be used in the construction of the new building. The building was finished in May 1834. A fourth courthouse was built in 1872. The fifth and current courthouse was built in 1930. Perry Township was created in May 1822, and Indian Creek Township was extended south to the river. Around the same time, Flinn Township was created. On January 23, 1826, Marion Township was created, followed by Marshall Township in June 1855. In March 1866, 180 residents petitioned for a new township, called "Morton", to be formed out of Shawswick, Bono, and Flinn, but after much thought was named Guthrie Township after an old pioneer family of the county. On January 1, 1911, Flinn Township was annexed by Shawswick, Guthrie, and Pleasant Run Townships, after the county commissioners meeting a month prior.

== Geography ==
According to the 2010 census, the county has a total area of 451.93 square miles (1,170.5 km^{2}), of which 449.17 square miles (1,163.3 km^{2}) (or 99.39%) is land and 2.76 square miles (7.1 km^{2}) (or 0.61%) is water.

=== Adjacent counties ===
- Monroe County (north)
- Jackson County (east)
- Washington County (southeast)
- Orange County (south)
- Martin County (west)
- Greene County (northwest)

=== Major highways ===
- U.S. Route 50
- State Road 37
- State Road 54
- State Road 58
- State Road 60
- State Road 158
- State Road 446
- State Road 450
- State Road 458

=== National protected area ===
- Hoosier National Forest (part)

== Municipalities ==
=== Cities and Towns ===
- Bedford
- Mitchell
- Oolitic

=== Census-designated places ===
- Avoca
- Williams

=== Unincorporated communities ===
- Bartlettsville
- Bono
- Bryantsville
- Buddha
- Coveyville
- Coxton
- East Oolitic – (previously known as Spien Kopj)
- Erie
- Eureka
- Fayetteville
- Fort Ritner
- Georgia
- Guthrie
- Hartleyville
- Heltonville
- Huron
- Judah
- Lawrenceport
- Leesville
- Murdock
- Needmore
- Patton Hill
- Peerless
- Pinhook
- Popcorn
- Rabbitville
- Red Hill
- Redding
- Rivervale
- Shawswick
- Silverville
- Spring Mill Village
- Springville
- Stemm
- Stonington
- Tarry Park
- Tunnelton
- Yockey
- Zelma

=== Former communities ===
- Armstrong
- Beck's
- Bottomville
- Burton
- Caseyville
- Cross Lanes
- Dark Hollow
- Deal
- Dixonville
- Dodd
- Dog Fennel
- Fairview
- Fishing Creek
- Five Points
- Flatwood Hollow
- Genoda
- Goat Run
- Goosetown
- Grayson
- Grindstone Hollow
- Heathen Bend
- Hog Holler
- Horseshoe Bend
- Jones' Defeat
- Jugtown
- Kentucky Hollow
- Leatherwood
- Liberty
- Lickskillet
- Lookout
- Marysville
- Maul Ridge
- Miles Standish
- Morgiana
- Opposition
- Palestine
- Pattonville
- Paul
- Reed's Station
- Rockledge
- Sand Pit
- Scottville
- Sinking Spring
- Speed Hollow
- Stringtown
- Sunset
- Torphytown
- Wolf Creek

== Townships ==
- Bono
- Guthrie
- Indian Creek
- Marion
- Marshall
- Perry
- Pleasant Run
- Shawswick
- Spice Valley

== Local sights ==
- Joe Palooka Statue – a statue of a comic strip character Joe Palooka, dedicated in 1948, is located near the town hall in Oolitic.
- Spring Mill State Park is located near Mitchell

== Astronauts ==
Lawrence County has had several native residents that have become astronauts over the years. They include:

- Virgil I. "Gus" Grissom was born and raised in Mitchell; was killed in the Apollo 1 accident
- Charles "Charlie" Walker was born and raised in Bedford.
- Kenneth "Kenny" Bowersox was born in Virginia but was raised in Bedford

The Virgil I. Gus Grissom Memorial, located at the Spring Mill State Park near Mitchell, has many mementos of his career, including the space capsule he commanded, "The Molly Brown" from Gemini 3.

== Climate and weather ==
Bedford, Indiana

Climate chart (precipitation, max. and min. temperature)
J	F	M	A	M	J	J	A	S	O	N	D
2.8 37 18	2.7 43 22	3.8 53 31	4.5 64 40	5 74 51	4.1 82 60	4.5 86 64	4.2 85 62	3.1 79 53	3.2 67 41	3.9 54 33	3.3 42 23
- █ Average max. and min. temperatures in °F
- █ Precipitation totals in inches
- Source: The Weather Channel
Metric conversion
J	F	M	A	M	J	J	A	S	O	N	D
70 3 −8	69 6 −6	96 12 −1	114 18 4	128 23 11	104 28 16	115 30 18	107 29 17	79 26 12	82 19 5	100 12 1	84 6 −5
- █ Average max. and min. temperatures in °C
- █ Precipitation totals in mm

In recent years, average temperatures in Bedford have ranged from a low of 18 °F (−8 °C) in January to a high of 86 °F (30 °C) in July, although a record low of −29 °F (−34 °C) was recorded in January 1994 and a record high of 111 °F (44 °C) was recorded in July 1930. Average monthly precipitation ranged from 2.70 inches (69 mm) in February to 5.04 inches (128 mm) in May.

== Government ==
The county government is a constitutional body, and is granted specific powers by the Constitution of Indiana, and by the Indiana Code.

County Council: The county council is the legislative branch of the county government and controls all the spending and revenue collection in the county. Representatives are elected from county districts. The council members serve four-year terms. They are responsible for setting salaries, the annual budget, and special spending. The council also has limited authority to impose local taxes, in the form of an income and property tax that is subject to state level approval, excise taxes, and service taxes.

Board of Commissioners: The executive body of the county is made of a board of commissioners. The commissioners are elected county-wide, in staggered terms, and each serves a four-year term. One of the commissioners, typically the most senior, serves as president. The commissioners are charged with executing the acts legislated by the council, collecting revenue, and managing the day-to-day functions of the county government.

Court: The county maintains a small claims court that can handle some civil cases. The judge on the court is elected to a term of four years and must be a member of the Indiana Bar Association. The judge is assisted by a constable who is also elected to a four-year term. In some cases, court decisions can be appealed to the state level circuit court.

County Officials: The county has several other elected offices, including sheriff, coroner, auditor, treasurer, recorder, surveyor, and circuit court clerk Each of these elected officers serves a term of four years and oversees a different part of county government. Members elected to county government positions are required to declare party affiliations and to be residents of the county.

Lawrence County is part of Indiana's 9th congressional district; Indiana Senate district 44; and Indiana House of Representatives districts 65 and 73.

United States presidential election results for Lawrence County, Indiana
Year	Republican		Democratic		Third party(ies)	
Year	No.	%	No.	%	No.	%
1888	2,256	55.24%	1,814	44.42%	14	0.34%
1892	2,529	52.11%	2,134	43.97%	190	3.92%
1896	3,103	55.70%	2,421	43.46%	47	0.84%
1900	3,535	57.07%	2,558	41.30%	101	1.63%
1904	3,924	57.93%	2,672	39.44%	178	2.63%
1908	3,884	53.77%	3,118	43.16%	222	3.07%
1912	1,633	23.87%	2,579	37.70%	2,628	38.42%
1916	3,813	52.55%	3,108	42.83%	335	4.62%
1920	6,808	58.15%	4,709	40.22%	191	1.63%
1924	7,438	60.70%	4,414	36.02%	402	3.28%
1928	9,844	68.70%	4,428	30.90%	57	0.40%
1932	8,314	49.66%	8,215	49.07%	212	1.27%
1936	9,982	54.91%	8,062	44.35%	134	0.74%
1940	10,717	61.92%	6,553	37.86%	38	0.22%
1944	9,200	63.38%	5,246	36.14%	69	0.48%
1948	8,643	58.13%	6,131	41.23%	95	0.64%
1952	11,296	64.64%	6,044	34.59%	135	0.77%
1956	11,090	63.93%	6,197	35.73%	59	0.34%
1960	11,119	61.15%	6,977	38.37%	86	0.47%
1964	8,186	48.28%	8,677	51.17%	93	0.55%
1968	8,830	54.35%	5,349	32.92%	2,069	12.73%
1972	10,936	71.55%	4,278	27.99%	70	0.46%
1976	9,278	53.20%	7,908	45.34%	254	1.46%
1980	10,846	62.71%	5,826	33.68%	624	3.61%
1984	11,440	66.71%	5,608	32.70%	102	0.59%
1988	10,742	64.71%	5,787	34.86%	70	0.42%
1992	7,712	45.96%	5,557	33.11%	3,512	20.93%
1996	8,107	50.64%	5,703	35.62%	2,199	13.74%
2000	10,677	66.14%	5,071	31.41%	394	2.44%
2004	12,207	68.97%	5,346	30.21%	145	0.82%
2008	11,018	59.45%	7,208	38.89%	308	1.66%
2012	11,622	65.04%	5,779	32.34%	469	2.62%
2016	14,035	72.95%	4,210	21.88%	993	5.16%
2020	15,601	74.04%	4,961	23.54%	509	2.42%
2024	15,830	74.60%	5,010	23.61%	380	1.79%

== Demographics ==
Historical population
Census	Pop.	Note	%±
1820	4,116		—
1830	9,234		124.3%
1840	11,782		27.6%
1850	12,097		2.7%
1860	13,692		13.2%
1870	14,628		6.8%
1880	18,543		26.8%
1890	19,792		6.7%
1900	25,729		30.0%
1910	30,625		19.0%
1920	28,228		−7.8%
1930	35,583		26.1%
1940	35,045		−1.5%
1950	34,346		−2.0%
1960	36,564		6.5%
1970	38,038		4.0%
1980	42,472		11.7%
1990	42,836		0.9%
2000	45,922		7.2%
2010	46,134		0.5%
2020	45,011		−2.4%
2025 (est.)	45,568	▲	1.2%
U.S. Decennial Census; 1790-1960 1900-1990; 1990-2000 2010

=== Racial and ethnic composition ===
Lawrence County, Indiana – Racial and ethnic composition Note: the US Census treats Hispanic/Latino as an ethnic category. This table excludes Latinos from the racial categories and assigns them to a separate category. Hispanics/Latinos may be of any race.
Race / Ethnicity (NH = Non-Hispanic)	Pop 1980	Pop 1990	Pop 2000	Pop 2010	Pop 2020	% 1980	% 1990	% 2000	% 2010	% 2020
White alone (NH)	42,080	42,418	44,711	44,562	42,224	99.08%	99.02%	97.36%	96.59%	93.81%
Black or African American alone (NH)	115	108	177	181	191	0.27%	0.25%	0.39%	0.39%	0.42%
Native American or Alaska Native alone (NH)	38	87	122	148	131	0.09%	0.20%	0.27%	0.32%	0.29%
Asian alone (NH)	63	74	129	224	207	0.15%	0.17%	0.28%	0.49%	0.46%
Native Hawaiian or Pacific Islander alone (NH)	x	x	4	9	4	x	x	0.01%	0.02%	0.01%
Other race alone (NH)	6	4	30	17	93	0.01%	0.01%	0.07%	0.04%	0.21%
Mixed race or Multiracial (NH)	x	x	333	448	1,396	x	x	0.73%	0.97%	3.10%
Hispanic or Latino (any race)	170	145	416	545	765	0.40%	0.34%	0.91%	1.18%	1.70%
Total	42,472	42,836	45,922	46,134	45,011	100.00%	100.00%	100.00%	100.00%	100.00%

=== 2020 census ===
As of the 2020 census, the county had a population of 45,011. The median age was 43.9 years. 21.4% of residents were under the age of 18 and 20.7% of residents were 65 years of age or older. For every 100 females there were 99.0 males, and for every 100 females age 18 and over there were 96.7 males age 18 and over.

The racial makeup of the county was 94.5% White, 0.5% Black or African American, 0.3% American Indian and Alaska Native, 0.5% Asian, <0.1% Native Hawaiian and Pacific Islander, 0.5% from some other race, and 3.7% from two or more races. Hispanic or Latino residents of any race comprised 1.7% of the population.

32.1% of residents lived in urban areas, while 67.9% lived in rural areas.

There were 18,542 households in the county, of which 27.9% had children under the age of 18 living in them. Of all households, 50.3% were married-couple households, 18.1% were households with a male householder and no spouse or partner present, and 24.9% were households with a female householder and no spouse or partner present. About 28.3% of all households were made up of individuals and 13.2% had someone living alone who was 65 years of age or older.

There were 20,484 housing units, of which 9.5% were vacant. Among occupied housing units, 77.3% were owner-occupied and 22.7% were renter-occupied. The homeowner vacancy rate was 1.7% and the rental vacancy rate was 7.7%.

=== 2010 census ===
As of the 2010 United States census, there were 46,134 people, 18,811 households, and 12,906 families residing in the county. The population density was 102.7 inhabitants per square mile (39.7/km^{2}). There were 21,074 housing units at an average density of 46.9 per square mile (18.1/km^{2}). The racial makeup of the county was 97.3% white, 0.5% Asian, 0.4% black or African American, 0.3% American Indian, 0.3% from other races, and 1.1% from two or more races. Those of Hispanic or Latino origin made up 1.2% of the population. In terms of ancestry, 18.4% were German, 14.6% were Irish, 13.1% were American, and 10.4% were English.

Of the 18,811 households, 31.2% had children under the age of 18 living with them, 54.1% were married couples living together, 10.1% had a female householder with no husband present, 31.4% were non-families, and 27.3% of all households were made up of individuals. The average household size was 2.42 and the average family size was 2.92. The median age was 41.6 years.

The median income for a household in the county was $47,697 and the median income for a family was $50,355. Males had a median income of $42,337 versus $30,386 for females. The per capita income for the county was $21,352. About 10.9% of families and 15.8% of the population were below the poverty line, including 23.4% of those under age 18 and 10.6% of those age 65 or over.

== See also ==
- National Register of Historic Places listings in Lawrence County, Indiana
