= U.S. Route 50 in Indiana =

Section of U.S. Highway in Indiana, United States

U.S. Route 50
- US 50 highlighted in red

Route information
- Maintained by INDOT
- Length: 171.38 mi (275.81 km)
- Existed: 1926–present

Major junctions
- West end: US 50 in Vincennes
- US 41 in Vincennes; US 150 from Vincennes to Shoals; I-69 in Washington; US 231 in Loogootee; I-65 in Seymour; US 31 in Seymour; US 421 in Versailles; I-275 in Lawrenceburg
- East end: US 50 in Greendale

Location
- Country: United States
- State: Indiana
- Counties: Knox, Daviess, Martin, Lawrence, Jackson, Jennings, Ripley, Dearborn

Highway system
- United States Numbered Highway System; List; Special; Divided; Indiana State Highway System; Interstate; US; State; Scenic
| ← SR 49 | → SR 51 |

U.S. Route 50 (US 50) is a part of the United States Numbered Highway System that runs from West Sacramento, California, to Ocean City, Maryland. In the U.S. state of Indiana, it is part of the state road system. US 50 enters the state in Vincennes. The 171.38 miles (275.81 km) of US 50 that lie within Indiana serve as a major conduit. All of the highway is listed on the National Highway System. Various sections are rural two-lane highway, urbanized four-lane undivided highway and one-way streets. The easternmost community along the highway is Lawrenceburg at the Ohio state line. US 50 passes through urban areas, farmland and woodland.

== Route description ==
US 50 enters Indiana over the Wabash River and a CSX railroad track as a four-lane, divided highway passing through rural farmland north of Vincennes. The highway heads east, turning southeast, having a cloverleaf interchange with US 41 and US 150. The three routes head southeast; the concurrency ends when US 41 keeps heading south and US 50 and US 150 turn east. The two routes head east towards Washington, as a four-lane divided highway passing through rural farmland. In Wheatland, the highway has an intersection with both SR 550 and SR 241. The road bypasses Washington around the south side of town, intersecting SR 57 and SR 257. On the east side of Washington, the highway has an interchange with Interstate 69 (I–69). After the interchange with I–69, the highway narrows to a two-lane highway and heads east towards Loogootee.

In Loogootee, the highway begins a concurrency with US 231. The concurrency heads north through the downtown area of Loogootee as a two-lane highway, passing commercial and residential properties. The concurrency ends when US 50 and US 150 turn east and with US 231 heading north. The highway heads east from Loogootee towards Shoals; in Shoals US 150 heads southeast towards Paoli and Louisville, Kentucky, and US 50 heads northeast towards Bedford. The highway passes through the Hoosier National Forest and an intersection with SR 650. Southwest of Bedford US 50 begins a concurrency with SR 37. The two routes head north, turning northeast crossing the east folk of the White River. After the river the concurrency turns northwest, then ends at an intersection with SR 450. SR 37 heads north and US 50 heads east, concurrent with SR 450, towards downtown Bedford. The concurrency heads towards downtown Bedford, passing through commercial and residential properties, as a four-lane highway with a center turn lane. Downtown the highway divides into one-way streets at an intersection with M Street, with eastbound on Sixteenth Street and westbound on Fifteenth Street. This intersection is also the eastern terminus of SR 450. The streets head through downtown and have the Lawrence County Court House between them. A block after the court house the one-way streets end at an intersection with H Street. The highway leaves downtown as a two-lane highway passing through mostly residential properties.

US 50 heads east-northeast from Bedford towards Brownstown, passing through farmland and woodland as a two-lane highway. The route has an intersection with SR 446 and SR 235. After SR 235 the road passes through mostly farmland with a few houses. The highway passes through a concurrency with SR 135, before entering Brownstown. In Brownstown the routes have an intersection with SR 250. From Brownstown the route heads northeast towards Seymour, passing through rural farmland with a few houses. US 50 enters Seymour and becomes a four-lane undivided highway, passing through commercial and residential properties, parallel to a CSX Railroad track. In downtown Seymour, the highway becomes a four-lane highway with a center turn lane and it has a short concurrency with SR 11. The route leaves downtown Seymour heading east passing through commercial properties and having an interchange with I–65 (coincidentally also numbered Exit 50). East of the interchange the road has an intersection with US 31 and the roadway narrows to a two-lane highway.

The highway leaves Seymour and heads northeast towards North Vernon, as a two-lane highway passing through farmland. The route bypasses North Vernon to the north on a road built in two sections in the 2010s. The road leaves the North Vernon area heading northeast towards Versailles, passing through farmland. The route passes just north of the Jefferson Proving Ground. West of Versailles, the highway begins a concurrency with US 421. The concurrency enters Versailles, heading southeast passing residential properties. US 421 turns south ending the concurrency, while a concurrency with SR 129 begins. The two routes head east leaving Versailles and entering the Versailles State Park. East of the state park the concurrency with SR 129 ends when SR 129 heads due north and US 50 heads southeast.

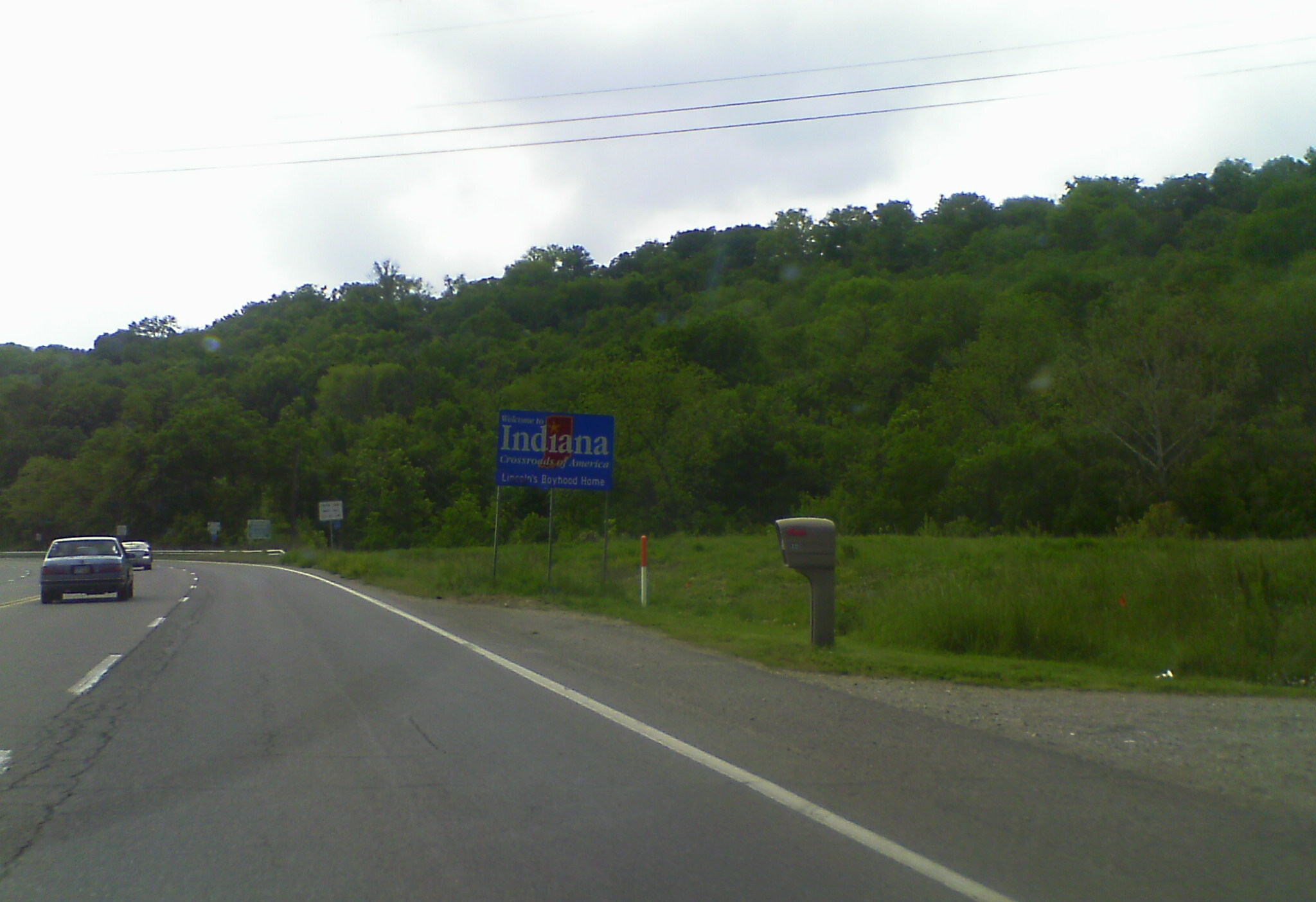
US 50 entering Indiana from Ohio

The route heads south east toward Dillsboro, passing through an intersection with State Road 101. At the intersection with SR 101, US 50 becomes a four-lane divided highway passing through woodland and farmland. In Dillsboro the road passes north of town and it has an intersection with SR 262, with access to SR 62 a tenth of a mile south of the junction. After Dillsboro the highway heads northeast towards Aurora, passing through woodlands. On the way to Aurora the highway becomes a four-lane undivided, before becoming a divided highway again. In Aurora the road has an intersection with SR 56 and SR 350. The highway heads northeast towards Lawrenceburg as a four-lane highway with a center turn lane, passing through commercial properties. In Lawrenceburg the route has an intersection with SR 48, followed by an intersection with SR 1, SR 1 provides access to I–275. The route leaves Lawrenceburg heading northeast as a four-lane undivided highway passing through woodland. US 50 enters Ohio as a four-lane undivided highway west of an underpass of I–275.

The entire length of US 50 in Indiana is included as a part of the National Highway System (NHS). The NHS is a network of highways that are identified as being most important for the economy, mobility and defense of the nation. The highway is maintained by the Indiana Department of Transportation (INDOT) like all other U.S. Highways in the state. The department tracks the traffic volumes along all state highways as a part of its maintenance responsibilities using a metric called average annual daily traffic (AADT). This measurement is a calculation of the traffic level along a segment of roadway for any average day of the year. In 2010, INDOT figured that lowest traffic levels were the 2,690 vehicles and 480 commercial vehicles used the highway daily between SR 446 and Lawrence–Jackson county line. The peak traffic volumes were 31,720 vehicles and 1,920 commercial vehicles AADT along the section of US 50 between SR 148 and SR 48.

== History ==
US 50 was first signed 1917 as Main to Market Highway number Five, from Illinois state line to Mitchell. East of Mitchell to the Ohio state line it was Main Market Highway number Four. The number US 50 was given to this route when the United States Numbered Highway System began in 1926.

State Road 750
- Location: North Vernon
- Existed: 2013–2018

INDOT built a bypass routing of US 50 around North Vernon in the 2010s, splitting it into two projects, North Vernon West and North Vernon East. North Vernon West opened December 10, 2013, carrying a temporary State Road 750 designation intended to exist until North Vernon East was completed and US 50 could be routed over the entire bypass; in actuality, although Mount Vernon East opened December 20, 2017, the SR 750 designation was retained until 2018 when the project contract expired.

== Major intersections ==
| County | Location | mi | km | Destinations | Notes |
|---|---|---|---|---|---|
| Knox | Vincennes | 0.00 | 0.00 | US 50 west – Lawrenceville | Illinois state line |
| Knox | Vincennes | 1.84 | 2.96 | US 41 north / US 150 west to SR 67 north – Terre Haute | Western end of US 41/US 150 concurrency |
| Knox | Vincennes | 3.04 | 4.89 | US 41 south – Evansville | Eastern end of US 41 concurrency |
| Knox | Wheatland | 13.16 | 21.18 | SR 550 west – Emison | Eastern terminus of SR 550 |
| Knox | Wheatland | 13.67 | 22.00 | SR 241 south – Decker | Northern terminus of SR 241 |
| Daviess | Washington | 20.53 | 33.04 | SR 57 – Evansville, Petersburg, Washington, Worthington | |
| Daviess | Washington | 22.72 | 36.56 | SR 257 – Otwell | |
| Daviess | Washington | | | I-69 – Evansville, Indianapolis | |
| Martin | Loogootee | 36.02 | 57.97 | US 231 south – Jasper | Southern end of US 231 concurrency |
| Martin | Loogootee | 36.49 | 58.72 | US 231 north – Bloomfield | Northern end of US 231 concurrency |
| Martin | Loogootee | 36.78 | 59.19 | SR 550 east | Western terminus of SR 550 |
| Martin | Center Township | 42.65 | 68.64 | SR 450 east – Bedford | Western terminus of SR 450 |
| Martin | Shoals | 44.18 | 71.10 | US 150 east – Paoli, Louisville | Eastern end of US 150 concurrency |
| Martin | Halbert Township | 48.19 | 77.55 | SR 650 east | Western terminus of SR 650 |
| Lawrence | Spice Valley Township | 54.33 | 87.44 | SR 60 east – Mitchell | Western terminus of SR 60 |
| Lawrence | Bedford | 64.09 | 103.14 | SR 37 south – Mitchell | Southern end of SR 37 concurrency |
| Lawrence | Bedford | 68.16 | 109.69 | SR 37 north / SR 450 west to SR 158 west – Bloomington | Northern end of SR 37 concurrency; western end of SR 450 concurrency |
| Lawrence | Bedford | 69.88 | 112.46 | SR 450 | Eastern terminus of SR 450 |
| Lawrence | Shawswick Township | 78.24 | 125.92 | SR 446 north – Bloomington, Heltonville | Southern terminus of SR 446 |
| Jackson | Owen Township | 88.63 | 142.64 | SR 235 south – Medora | Northern terminus of SR 235 |
| Jackson | Owen Township | 91.27 | 146.88 | SR 135 north – Medora | Western end of SR 135 concurrency |
| Jackson | Brownstown | 94.33 | 151.81 | SR 135 south – Freetown | Eastern end of SR 135 concurrency |
| Jackson | Brownstown | 95.12 | 153.08 | SR 250 east – Uniontown | Western terminus of SR 250 |
| Jackson | Seymour | 105.26 | 169.40 | SR 11 south | Western end of SR 11 concurrency |
| Jackson | Seymour | 105.57 | 169.90 | SR 11 north – Columbus | Eastern end of SR 11 concurrency |
| Jackson | Seymour | 107.83 | 173.54 | I-65 – Indianapolis, Louisville | |
| Jackson | Seymour | 108.30 | 174.29 | US 31 – Scottsburg, Columbus | |
| Jennings | North Vernon | 120.54 | 193.99 | SR 3 / SR 7 – Vernon, Columbus, Greensburg | |
| Ripley | Versailles | 141.07 | 227.03 | US 421 north – Greensburg | Western end of US 421 concurrency |
| Ripley | Versailles | 141.99 | 228.51 | US 421 south / SR 129 south – Madison, Vevay | Eastern end of US 421 concurrency; western end of SR 129 concurrency |
| Ripley | Johnson–Washington township line | 145.91 | 234.82 | SR 129 north – Batesville | Eastern end of SR 129 concurrency |
| Ripley | Washington Township | 149.04 | 239.86 | SR 101 north – Milan | Southern terminus of SR 101 |
| Dearborn | Dillsboro | 154.28 | 248.29 | SR 262 east to SR 62 – Rising Sun, Madison | Western terminus of SR 262, eastern terminus of SR 62 located 1/10 mi. south of intersection |
| Dearborn | Aurora | | | Lower Dillsboro Road | Westbound exit and entrance; westbound exit via Forest Avenue |
| Dearborn | Aurora | 163.14 | 262.55 | SR 56 west / SR 350 west – Rising Sun, Osgood | Eastern terminus of SR 56; eastern terminus of SR 350 |
| Dearborn | Aurora | 163.63 | 263.34 | SR 148 west | Eastern terminus of SR 148 |
| Dearborn | Lawrenceburg Township | 166.59 | 268.10 | SR 48 west – Napoleon | Eastern terminus of SR 48 |
| Dearborn | Lawrenceburg Township | | | Bielby Road | Westbound exit and entrance; entrance from Main Street |
| Dearborn | Lawrenceburg | 169.07 | 272.09 | I-275 / SR 1 north – Ohio, Kentucky | Southern terminus of SR 1 |
| Dearborn | Lawrenceburg Township | 171.38 | 275.81 | US 50 east – Cincinnati | Ohio state line |
1.000 mi = 1.609 km; 1.000 km = 0.621 mi: Concurrency terminus

== See also ==
U.S. Route 50
| Previous state: Illinois | Indiana | Next state: Ohio |
