= Buddha, Indiana =

- Unincorporated town
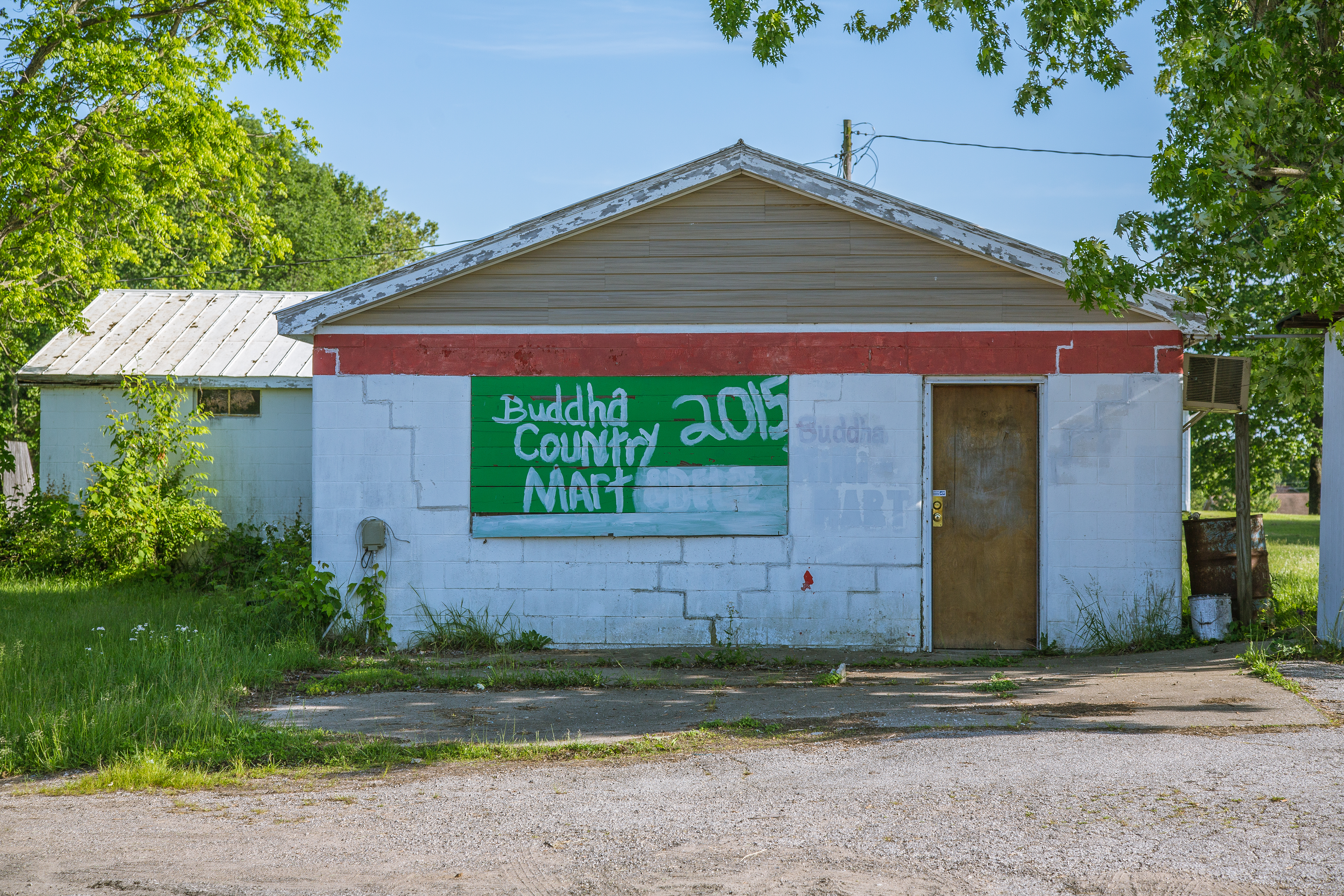

- Location within Indiana Location within the United States
- Coordinates: 38°47′31″N 86°24′24″W
- Country: United States
- State: Indiana
- County: Lawrence
- Township: Guthrie
- Elevation: 696 ft (212 m)
- ZIP code: 47421
- FIPS code: 18-08902
- GNIS feature ID: 431762

Buddha is an unincorporated town in Guthrie Township, Lawrence County, Indiana.

== History ==
A post office was established in 1896. The residents of the area submitted several names to the federal government for consideration, and Buddha was chosen.
