= Tarry v Ashton =

In Tarry v Ashton (1876) 1 QBD 314, an important case in English tort law.

== Facts ==
A lamp that the defendant had employed an independent contractor to repair was not securely fastened to the wall of the defendant's house. It fell on a passer-by.

== Judgment ==
Finding the defendant to be liable, Lord Blackman said the following:

But it was the defendant's duty to make the lamp reasonably safe, the contractor failed to do that; and the defendant, having the duty, has trusted fulfillment of that duty to another who has not done it. Therefore the defendant has not done his duty, and he is liable to the plaintiff for the consequences.

== See also ==
- Law of agency
- Delict
