= Patton Hill, Indiana =

- Unincorporated community
- Location within Indiana Location within the United States
- Coordinates: 38°54′02″N 86°32′17″W
- Country: United States
- State: Indiana
- County: Lawrence
- Township: Indian Creek
- Elevation: 643 ft (196 m)
- ZIP code: 47421
- FIPS code: 18-58446
- GNIS feature ID: 451317

Patton Hill is an unincorporated community in the Indian Creek Township, of Lawrence County, Indiana.
