= Murdock, Indiana =

Unincorporated community in Indiana, U.S.

Coordinates: 38°54′35″N 86°30′30″W

Murdock is an unincorporated community in Lawrence County, Indiana, United States. It was originally developed around a rail yard.
