= Indiana State Road 450 =

State highway in Indiana, United States

State Road 450
- SR 450 highlighted in red

Route information
- Maintained by INDOT
- Length: 24.956 mi (40.163 km)
- Existed: 1932–present

Major junctions
- West end: US 50 near Shoals
- East end: US 50 / SR 37 at Bedford

Location
- Country: United States
- State: Indiana
- Counties: Martin, Lawrence

Highway system
- Indiana State Highway System; Interstate; US; State; Scenic
← SR 446	→ SR 458

State Road 450 is a winding route in southern Indiana that terminates at both ends at its parent route, U.S. Route 50. It covers a distance of about 25 miles (40 km).

== Route description ==
State Road 450 begins just north of the town of Shoals in Martin County and runs northeast to rejoin U.S. Route 50 in Bedford in Lawrence County.

== Major intersections ==
County	Location	mi	km	Destinations	Notes
Martin	Shoals	0.000	0.000	US 50 / US 150 – Loogootee, Shoals	Western Terminus of SR 450
Lawrence	Bedford	24.783	39.884	SR 158 west	Eastern terminus of SR 158
Lawrence	Bedford	24.956	40.163	US 50 / SR 37 – Bloomington, Indianapolis	Eastern terminus of SR 450
1.000 mi = 1.609 km; 1.000 km = 0.621 mi
