= Pleasant Run Township, Lawrence County, Indiana =

Pleasant Run Township
- Township
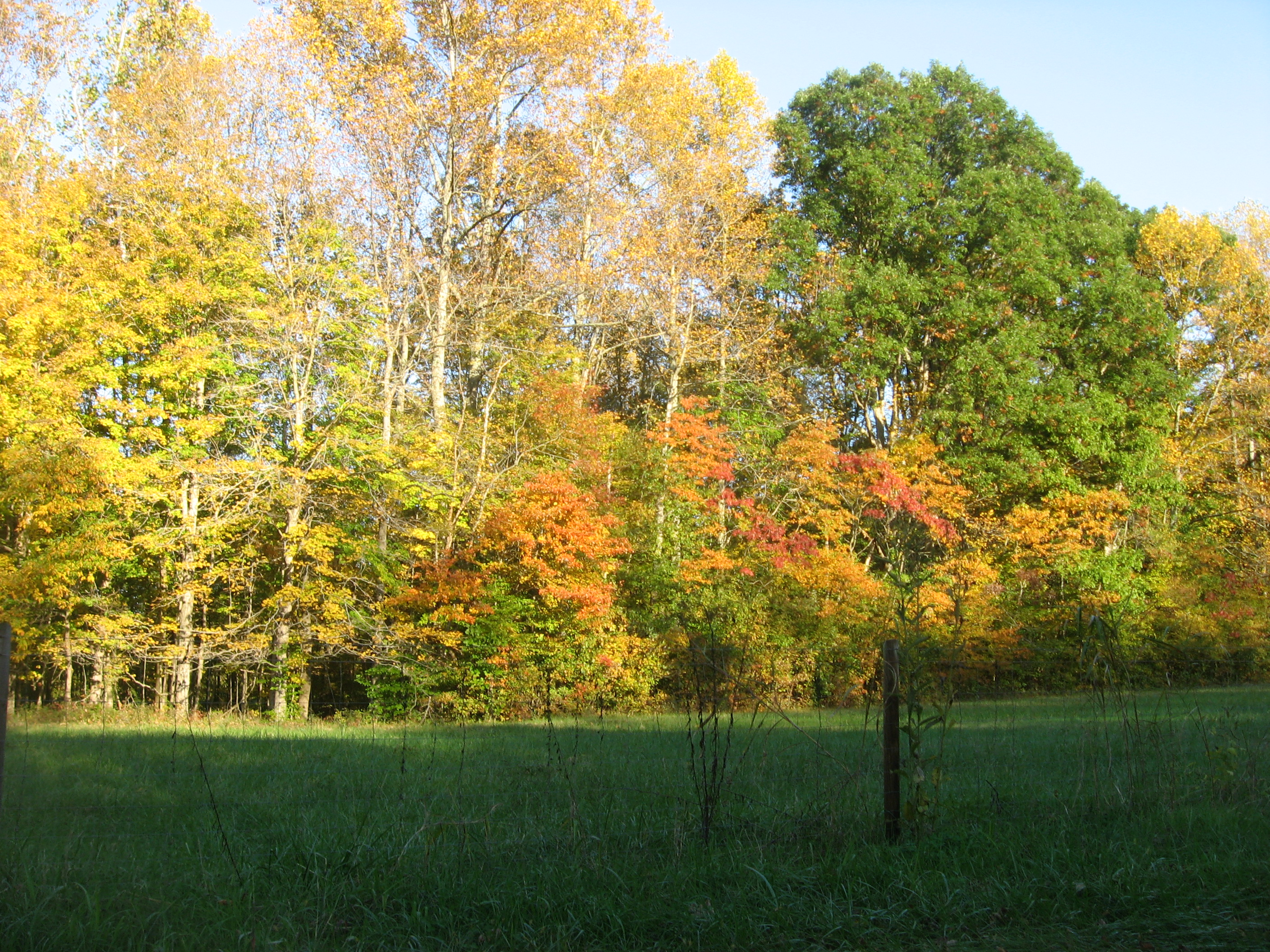
- Scenery in the township

- Location in Lawrence County
- Coordinates: 38°56′31″N 86°21′59″W
- Country: United States
- State: Indiana
- County: Lawrence

Government
  - Type: Indiana township
  - Trustee: Michael Nicholson

Area
  - Total: 64.79 sq mi (167.8 km^{2})
  - Land: 64.77 sq mi (167.8 km^{2})
  - Water: 0.02 sq mi (0.052 km^{2}) 0.03%
- Elevation: 738 ft (225 m)

Population (2020)
  - Total: 1,704
  - Density: 29.1/sq mi (11.2/km^{2})
- ZIP codes: 47264, 47421, 47436
- GNIS feature ID: 0453752

Pleasant Run Township is one of nine townships in Lawrence County, Indiana, United States. As of the 2010 census, its population was 1,883 and it contained 862 housing units.

== History ==
Pleasant Run Township was established in 1818. It was named after the Pleasant Run creek.

== Geography ==
According to the 2010 census, the township has a total area of 64.79 square miles (167.8 km^{2}), of which 64.77 square miles (167.8 km^{2}) (or 99.97%) is land and 0.02 square miles (0.052 km^{2}) (or 0.03%) is water.

=== Unincorporated towns ===
- Bartlettsville at 38.970328°N 86.441937°W
- Heltonville at 38.927829°N 86.375546°W
- Zelma at 38.933940°N 86.301932°W

=== Cemeteries ===
The township contains these five cemeteries: Bailey, Covey, Faubion, Hawkins and Tanksley.

=== Major highways ===
- U.S. Route 50

=== Lakes ===
- Rainbow Lake

== Demographics ==
Historical population
Census	Pop.	Note	%±
1890	1,849		—
1900	2,004		8.4%
1910	1,769		−11.7%
1920	1,720		−2.8%
1930	1,645		−4.4%
1940	1,766		7.4%
1950	1,540		−12.8%
1960	1,570		1.9%
1970	1,601		2.0%
1980	1,579		−1.4%
1990	1,649		4.4%
2000	1,922		16.6%
2010	1,883		−2.0%
2020	1,704		−9.5%

== School districts ==
- North Lawrence Community Schools

== Political districts ==
- Indiana's 9th congressional district
- State House District 65
- State Senate District 44
