= Redding, Indiana =

Former town in Indiana, U.S.

Coordinates: 38°46′28″N 86°30′14″W

Redding was an unincorporated town in Lawrence County, Indiana, in the United States.

== History ==
Redding was platted in 1842. It was laid out by John R. Nugent and Robert Porter.

The post office Redding once contained was called Sinking Spring. This post office operated from 1837 until 1852. By the 1880s the town no longer existed.
