= Fayetteville, Indiana =

- Unincorporated community
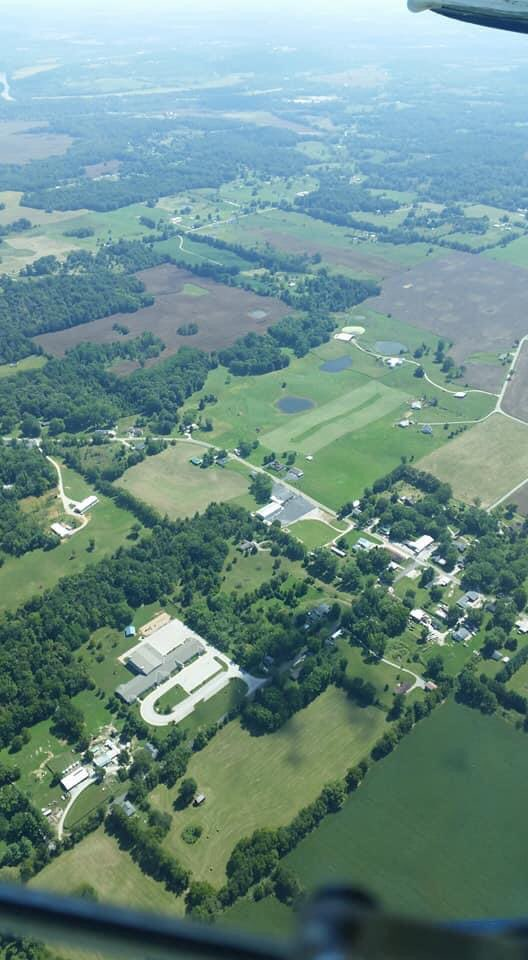
- An aerial image of Fayetteville on September 15, 2018.

- Location within Indiana Location within the United States
- Coordinates: 38°51′39″N 86°35′43″W
- Country: United States
- State: Indiana
- County: Lawrence
- Township: Indian Creek
- Elevation: 610 ft (190 m)
- ZIP code: 47421
- FIPS code: 18-22900
- GNIS feature ID: 450908

Fayetteville is an unincorporated community in Indian Creek Township, Lawrence County, in the U.S. state of Indiana.

== History ==
Fayetteville was platted on February 6, 1838, by Ezra Kern. The community was likely named in honor of John Fayette, a pioneer. Before Fayetteville was platted, John Vestal opened up the first merchandising house in 1818. In 1874, an addition was made to Fayetteville by Noah Kern. A post office was established at Fayetteville in 1846, and remained in operation until it was discontinued in 1907. By 1910, Fayetteville had a population of about 125, and was a country town trading place.

The area experienced its strongest tornado on March 8, 2009. A confirmed EF3 tornado touched down in Fayetteville, destroying three houses and damaging at least 19 others. Several barns and other structures were also damaged or destroyed. The tornado injured one person.

== Fire department ==
Fayetteville, and the surrounding township, is protected by the Indian Creek Volunteer Fire Department (ICVFD). The department's 23 members respond to all types of emergencies, including, but not limited to, fire and medical calls, and are often dispatched as medical first responders when an ambulance is dispatched to the township from the nearby City of Bedford. The department responded to 234 calls in 2012, a record high for the department. ICVFD has mutual aid agreements with all other volunteer fire departments in Lawrence County.
