= Bartlettsville, Indiana =

- Unincorporated community
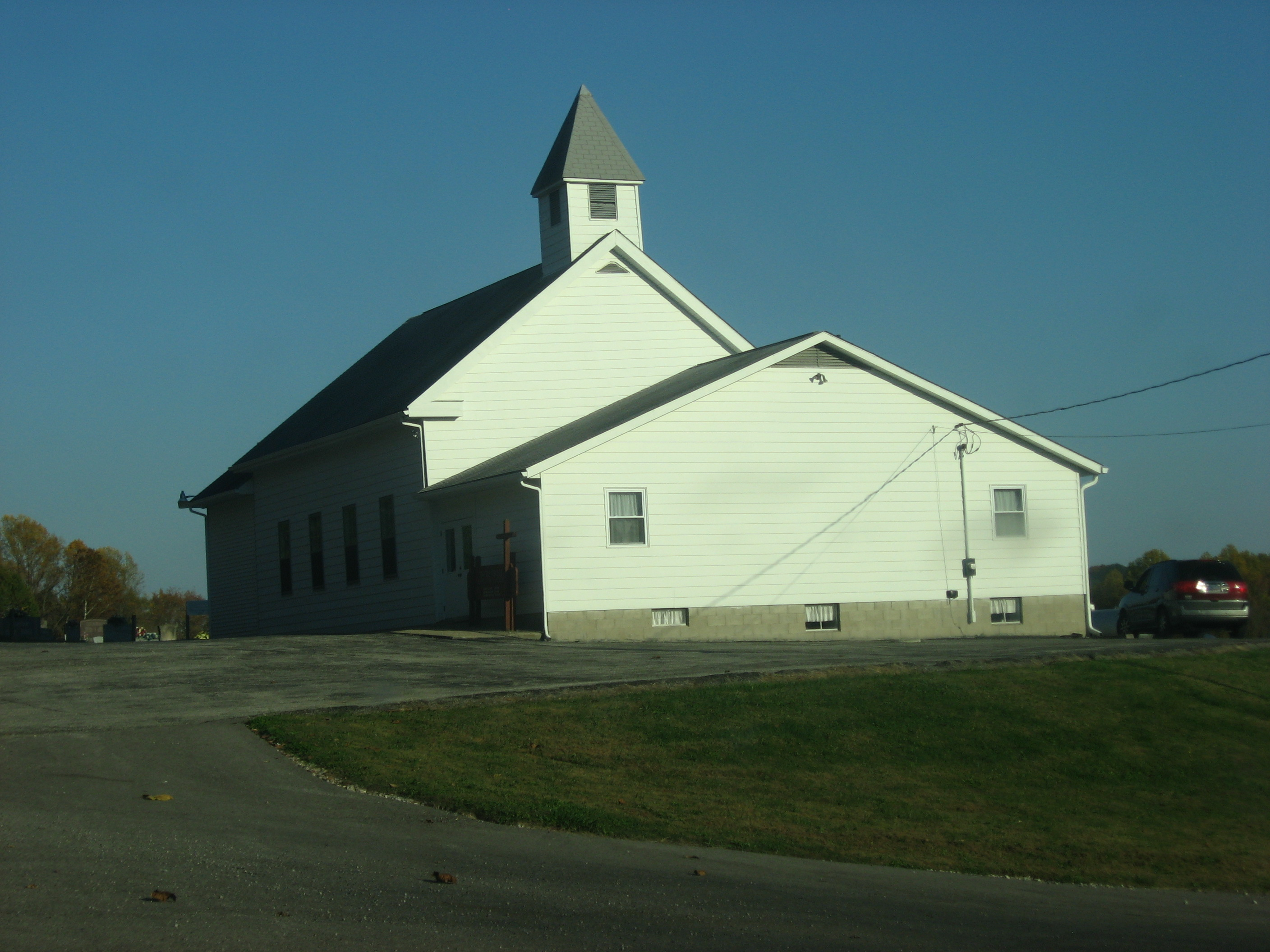
- Bartlettsville Christian Church

- Location within Indiana Location within the United States
- Coordinates: 38°58′13″N 86°26′31″W
- Country: United States
- State: Indiana
- County: Lawrence
- Township: Pleasant Run
- Elevation: 541 ft (165 m)
- ZIP code: 47421
- FIPS code: 18-03520
- GNIS feature ID: 450655

Bartlettsville is an unincorporated community in Pleasant Run Township, Lawrence County, Indiana, United States.

== History ==
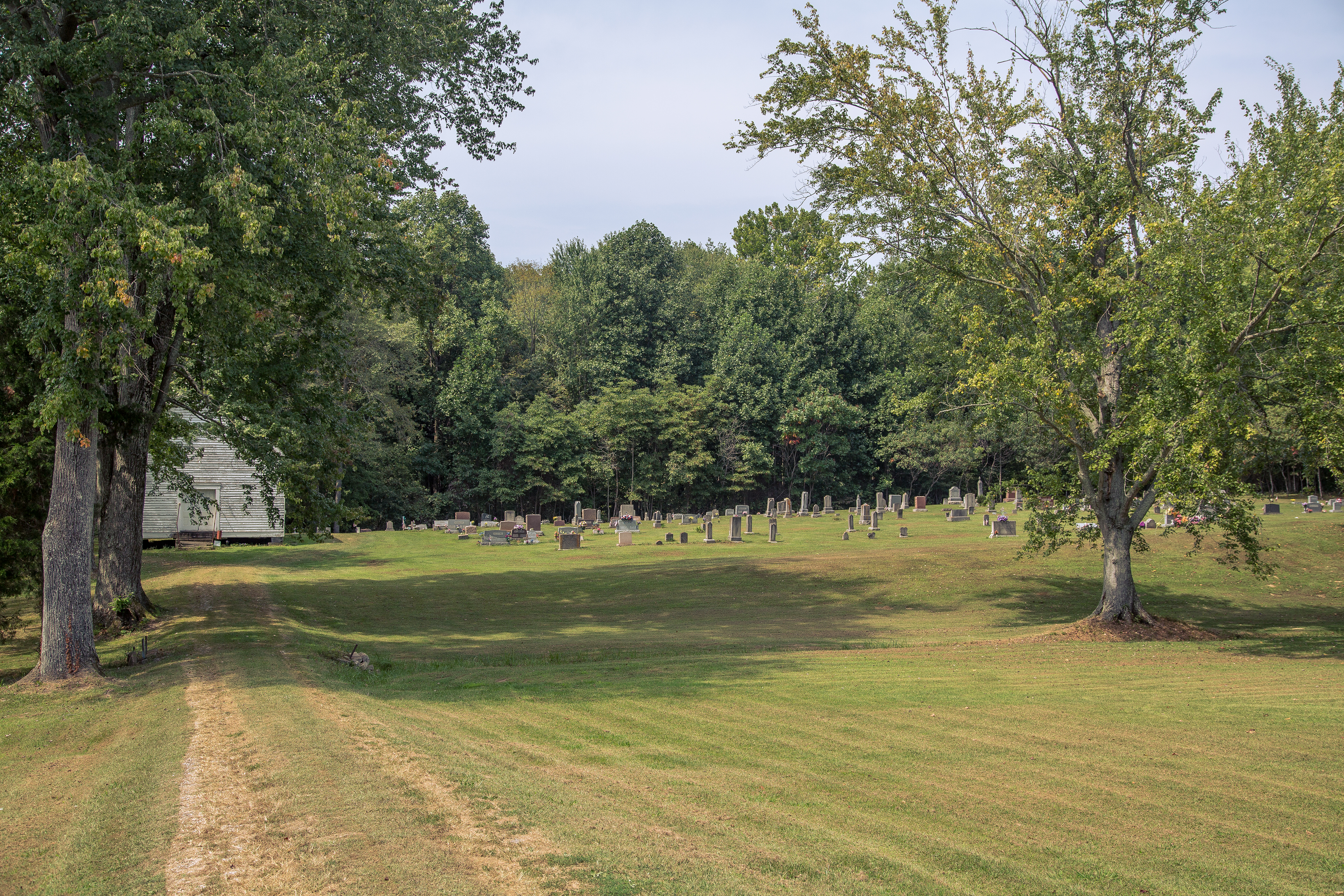
Bartlettsville cemetery

Bartlettsville was platted in 1860 by Samuel J. Bartlett, and named for him. A post office was established at Bartlettsville in 1886, and remained in operation until it was discontinued in 1905.
