= Guthrie, Indiana =

- Unincorporated community
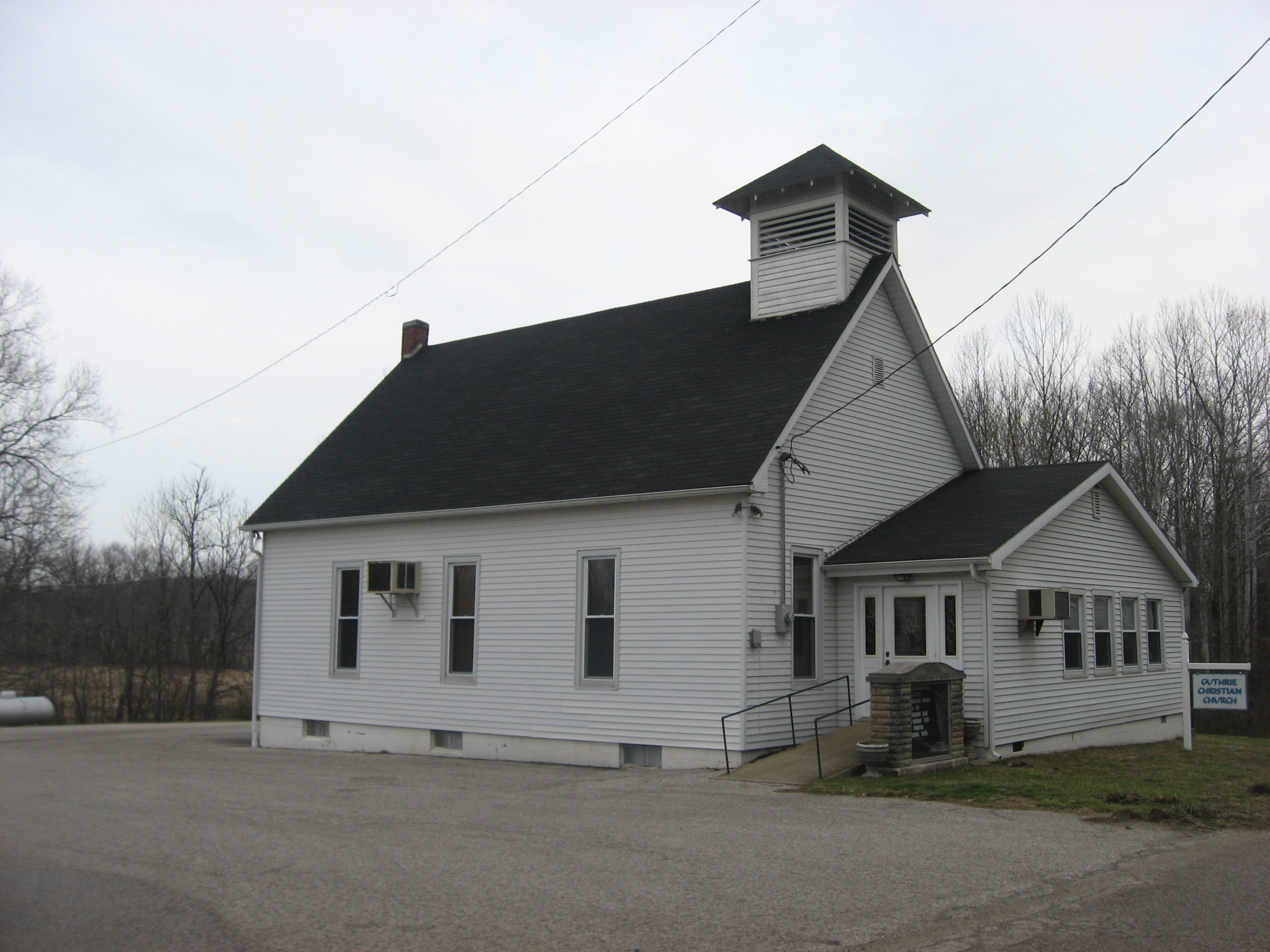
- Guthrie Christian Church

- Location within Indiana Location within the United States
- Coordinates: 38°58′36″N 86°30′33″W
- Country: United States
- State: Indiana
- County: Lawrence
- Township: Marshall
- Elevation: 525 ft (160 m)
- ZIP code: 47421
- FIPS code: 18-30240
- GNIS feature ID: 450992

Guthrie is an unincorporated community in Marshall Township, Lawrence County, Indiana.

== History ==
Guthrie was platted in 1866 and was named for a prominent family of pioneer settlers. The townsite was platted by Winepark Kinser.
