= Heltonville, Indiana =

- Census-designated place
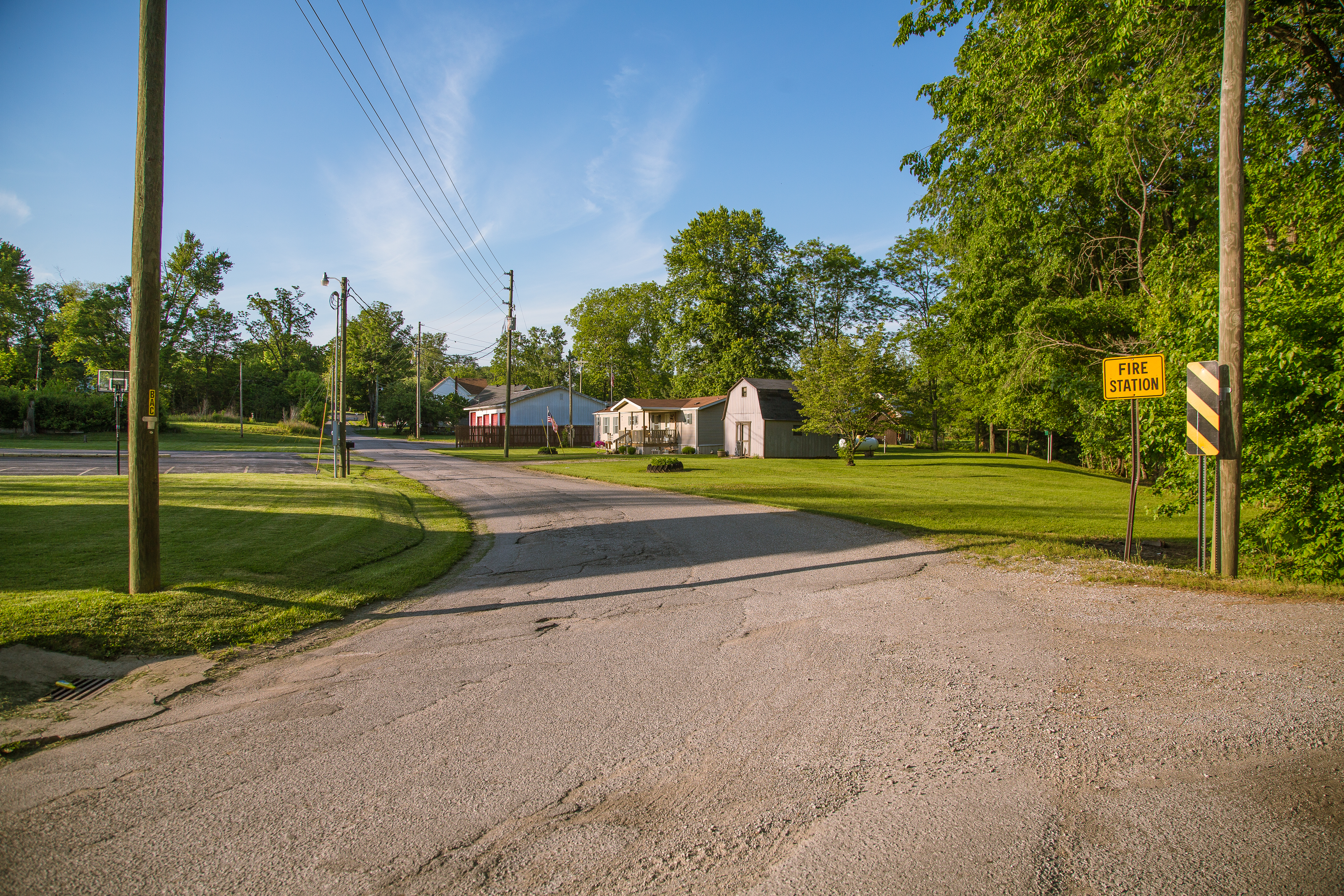

- Location within Indiana Location within the United States
- Coordinates: 38°55′47″N 86°22′32″W
- Country: United States
- State: Indiana
- County: Lawrence
- Township: Pleasant Run
- Elevation: 659 ft (201 m)
- ZIP code: 47436
- FIPS code: 18-32980
- GNIS feature ID: 2830450

Heltonville is a census-designated place in Pleasant Run Township, Lawrence County, Indiana, United States.

== History ==
Heltonville was platted in 1845. It was named for its founder, Andrew Helton, who had opened a store at the site some time before 1839. The Heltonville post office was established in 1846.

== Education ==
Heltonville Elementary School, a school for students in kindergarten through fifth grade, educates approximately 100 students per year. In 2013, Heltonville Elementary received a rating of "1" out of 5 by the Indiana Department of Education.

== Demographics ==
The United States Census Bureau delineated Heltonville as a census designated place in the 2022 American Community Survey.

== Notable people ==
- Damon Bailey, NBA basketball player
