= Guthrie Township, Lawrence County, Indiana =

Guthrie Township
- Township
- Location in Lawrence County
- Coordinates: 38°48′38″N 86°20′14″W
- Country: United States
- State: Indiana
- County: Lawrence

Government
  - Type: Indiana township

Area
  - Total: 42.79 sq mi (110.8 km^{2})
  - Land: 42.19 sq mi (109.3 km^{2})
  - Water: 0.6 sq mi (1.6 km^{2}) 1.40%
- Elevation: 728 ft (222 m)

Population (2020)
  - Total: 1,312
  - Density: 32.8/sq mi (12.7/km^{2})
- ZIP codes: 47264, 47421, 47430, 47467
- GNIS feature ID: 0453359

Guthrie Township is one of nine townships in Lawrence County, Indiana, United States. As of the 2010 census, its population was 1,383 and it contained 654 housing units.

== History ==
Guthrie Township was established in the early 1860s. Guthrie was the surname of a family of pioneer settlers.

The Clampitt Site was listed in the National Register of Historic Places in 2016.

== Geography ==
According to the 2010 census, the township has a total area of 42.79 square miles (110.8 km^{2}), of which 42.19 square miles (109.3 km^{2}) (or 98.60%) is land and 0.6 square miles (1.6 km^{2}) (or 1.40%) is water. The township's southern border is defined by the East Fork White River.

=== Unincorporated towns ===
- Buddha at 38.791997°N 86.406656°W
- Fort Ritner at 38.773109°N 86.281096°W
- Leesville at 38.845608°N 86.284431°W
- Pinhook at 38.815330°N 86.356377°W
- Tunnelton at 38.768664°N 86.342765°W

(This list is based on USGS data and may include former settlements.)

=== Cemeteries ===
The township contains these cemeteries: Carlton, Dodd, Johnston, and Pinhook.

== Demographics ==
Historical population
Census	Pop.	Note	%±
1890	1,083		—
1900	1,295		19.6%
1910	1,056		−18.5%
1920	1,370		29.7%
1930	1,399		2.1%
1940	1,318		−5.8%
1950	1,233		−6.4%
1960	1,184		−4.0%
1970	1,160		−2.0%
1980	1,275		9.9%
1990	1,358		6.5%
2000	1,583		16.6%
2010	1,383		−12.6%
2020	1,312		−5.1%

== School districts ==
- North Lawrence Community Schools

== Political districts ==
- Indiana's 4th congressional district
- State House District 65
- State Senate District 44

== Organizations ==
- Guthrie Township Volunteer Fire Department
