= Leesville, Indiana =

Unincorporated community in Indiana, U.S.

Coordinates: 38°50′44″N 86°17′04″W

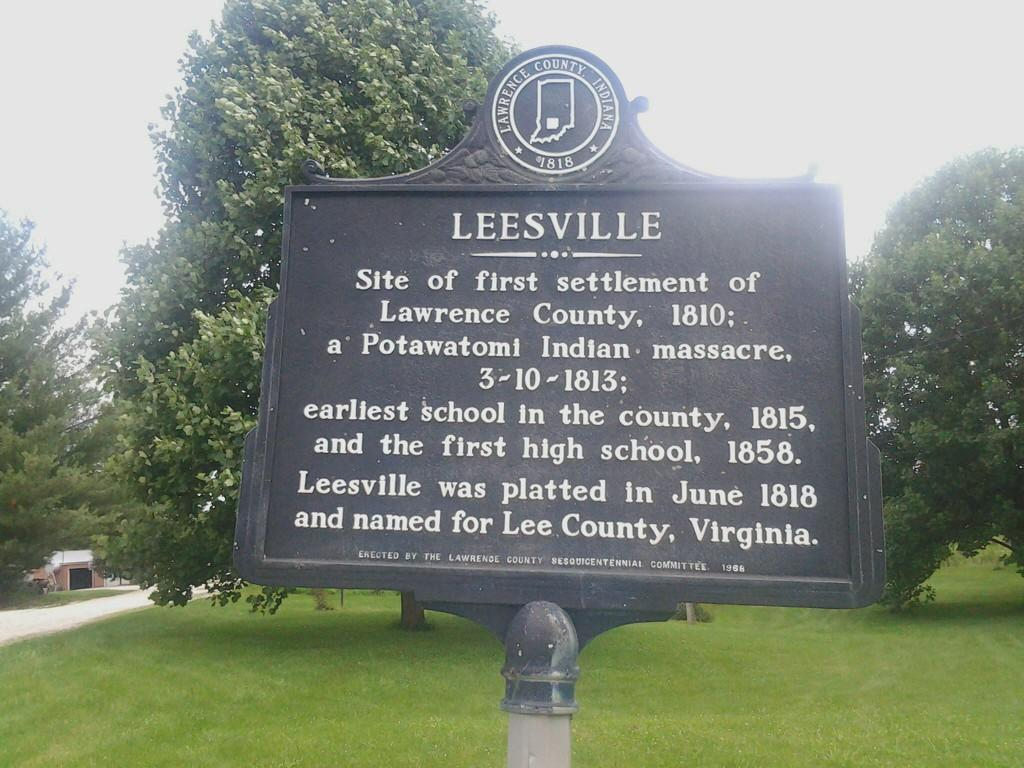
Historic marker for Leesville Indiana, describing its founding and the history of the town

Leesville is an unincorporated community in Lawrence County, Indiana, United States.

== History ==
Leesville was founded in 1818. A majority of the early settlers being natives of Lee County, Virginia, caused the name to be selected.
