= Yockey, Indiana =

- Unincorporated community
- Location within Indiana Location within the United States
- Coordinates: 38°47′17″N 86°29′35″W
- Country: United States
- State: Indiana
- County: Lawrence
- Township: Marion
- Elevation: 610 ft (190 m)
- ZIP code: 47446
- FIPS code: 18-85904
- GNIS feature ID: 446395

Yockey, or Redcross or Juliet is a former unincorporated community in Marion Township, Lawrence County, Indiana.

== Geography ==
Yockey was south of Bedford and north of Mitchell, on the Dixie Highway.

== History ==
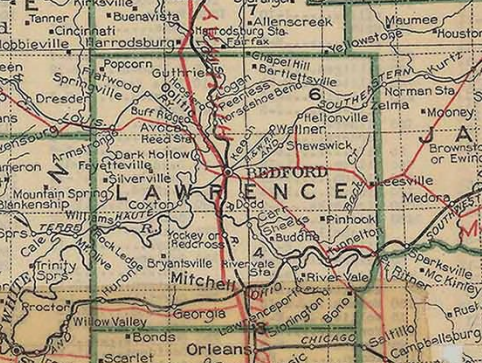
Lawrence County, Indiana, in 1919, showing Yockey/Redcross

Yockey has also been called Redcross and Juliet.

The community of Juliet was platted in 1850, in Section 11 of the township. The Louisville, New Albany & Chicago Railway was built through the area at that time, and due to Juliet being the terminus of the line for several months, the community "became quite a commercial point; goods were wagoned from there to Bedford, Bloomington, Greencastle and all towns on that line; stage lines were established away up in the direction of Chicago; but the completion of the railroad north ruined the town's prosperity, and it soon fell into decay" for a number of years. The etymology of the name "Juliet" is unknown; the post office operated from 1852 to 1869.

The name became Yockey when the postal name changed on January 10, 1880. The name Yockey honored Charles Yockey, editor of several county newspapers. Yockey's population was 50 in 1890, and was 57 in 1900.

Under the name Redcross the post office operated from 1893 to 1913. During this era, Redcross was the site of several lime kiln operations, which employed around 40 men in the area. The railroad station in the community closed circa the 1930s, according to a 1935 newspaper article in the Mitchell Tribune.

A central passage house was all that was left of the community by 1992.

== See also ==
- Popcorn, Indiana
