= Oolitic, Indiana =

- Town
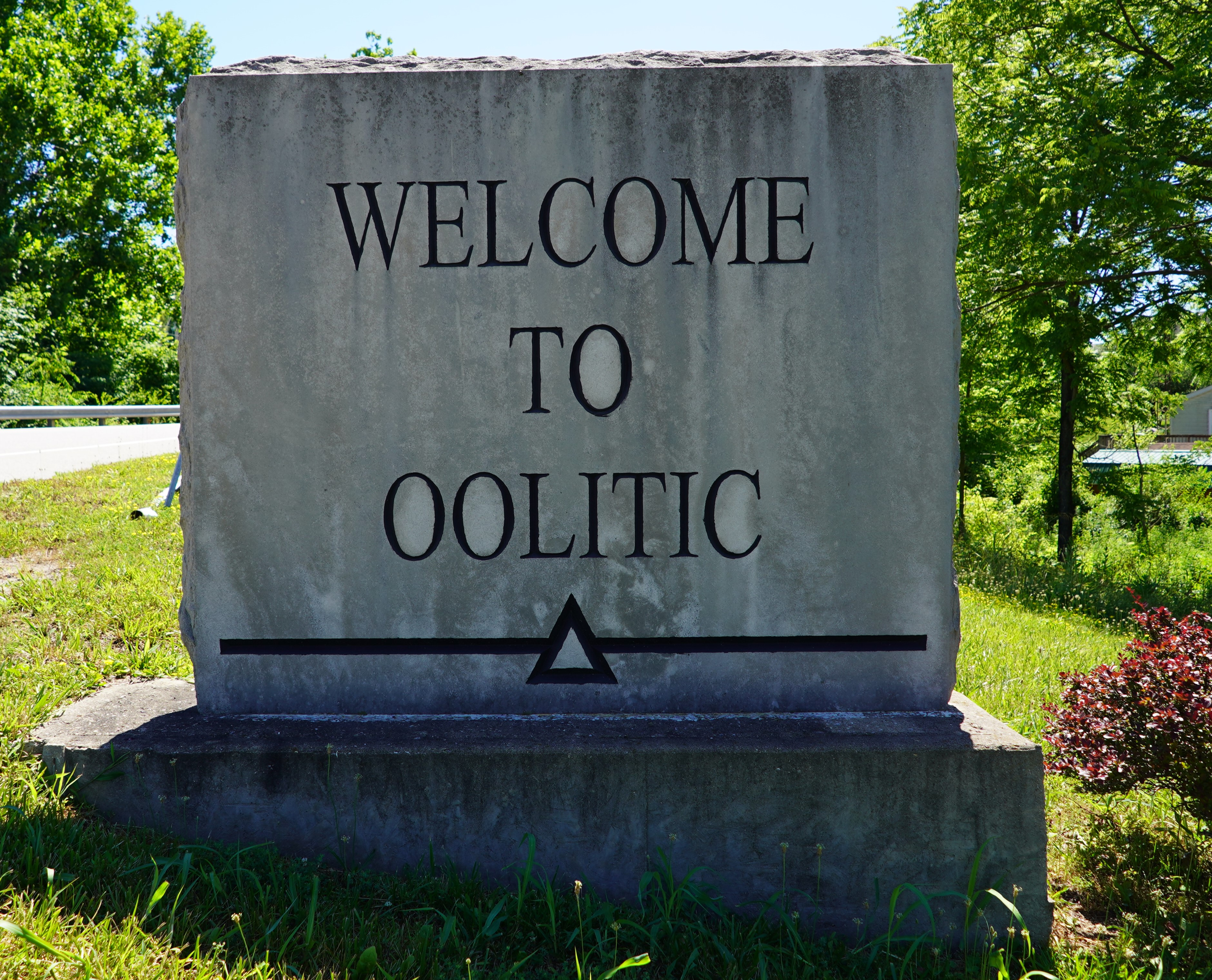
- Oolitic, Indiana

- Flag

- Location of Oolitic in Lawrence County, Indiana.
- Coordinates: 38°53′37″N 86°31′31″W
- Country: United States
- State: Indiana
- County: Lawrence
- Township: Indian Creek, Shawswick

Area
  - Total: 0.67 sq mi (1.73 km^{2})
  - Land: 0.67 sq mi (1.73 km^{2})
  - Water: 0 sq mi (0.00 km^{2})
- Elevation: 564 ft (172 m)

Population (2020)
  - Total: 1,137
  - Density: 1,704.7/sq mi (658.18/km^{2})
- Time zone: UTC-5 (Eastern (EST))
  - Summer (DST): UTC-4 (EDT)
- ZIP code: 47451
- Area code: 812
- FIPS code: 18-56682
- GNIS feature ID: 2396834

Oolitic is a town in Indian Creek and Shawswick townships, Lawrence County, Indiana, United States. As of the 2020 census, Oolitic had a population of 1,137.

== History ==
Oolitic was platted on March 23, 1896, by the Bedford Quarries Company. It was incorporated in 1900. In 1910, its population was 1,079; in 1914 it had risen to about 2,000. Oolite is a type of limestone found in Indiana.

Oolitic is the site of a limestone statue of comic-strip boxer Joe Palooka, moved there from Bedford in 1984.

Oolitic is the opposing basketball team during the season opener in the film Hoosiers.

== Geography ==
According to the 2010 census, Oolitic has a total area of 0.78 square miles (2.02 km^{2}), all land.

=== Climate ===
The climate in this area is characterized by hot, humid summers and generally mild to cool winters. According to the Köppen Climate Classification system, Oolitic has a humid subtropical climate, abbreviated "Cfa" on climate maps.

== Geology ==
The town is built upon oolitic limestone, which gives the town's name. The town was founded for the purpose of quarrying this material, for building purposes.

Oolitic was originally platted as "Limestone" on September 26, 1888. In 1896, the name was sent to Washington, D.C., to allow a post office to be established. The request was refused because of a town already named Limestone, Indiana. Doctor R. B. Short suggested using "Oolitic", and Oolitic became incorporated on November 4, 1901. The word Oolitic was used as an adjective for oolitic limestone (derived from the Greek word oolite, meaning eggs and stone). Limestone is a sedimentary rock composed of calcium carbonate, magnesium carbonate and quartz, along with the small shells and eggs left behind when this area was covered by an inland sea. Found immediately north of Oolitic are some of the largest limestone quarries in the world, many of them in continuous operation since the 1830s. Many famous buildings have been built from local oolitic limestone, including the Empire State Building. Visitors can see the "Empire Hole," about half a mile north of Oolitic, where 35,017,500 pounds of limestone block were extracted in 1931 and shipped to Manhattan for the 102-story building. The Empire Hole was also the source of the stone used in the Empire State Building's 2001 renovations.

== Demographics ==
Historical population
Census	Pop.	Note	%±
1910	1,079		—
1920	883		−18.2%
1930	1,210		37.0%
1940	1,186		−2.0%
1950	1,125		−5.1%
1960	1,140		1.3%
1970	1,155		1.3%
1980	1,495		29.4%
1990	1,424		−4.7%
2000	1,152		−19.1%
2010	1,184		2.8%
2020	1,137		−4.0%
U.S. Decennial Census

=== 2020 census ===
As of the 2020 census, Oolitic had a population of 1,137. The median age was 41.8 years. 20.3% of residents were under the age of 18 and 20.6% of residents were 65 years of age or older. For every 100 females there were 99.1 males, and for every 100 females age 18 and over there were 94.0 males age 18 and over.

100.0% of residents lived in urban areas, while 0.0% lived in rural areas.

There were 500 households in Oolitic, of which 32.4% had children under the age of 18 living in them. Of all households, 44.0% were married-couple households, 20.2% were households with a male householder and no spouse or partner present, and 27.6% were households with a female householder and no spouse or partner present. About 28.6% of all households were made up of individuals and 13.0% had someone living alone who was 65 years of age or older.

There were 560 housing units, of which 10.7% were vacant. The homeowner vacancy rate was 2.1% and the rental vacancy rate was 16.4%.

Racial composition as of the 2020 census
Race	Number	Percent
White	1,078	94.8%
Black or African American	5	0.4%
American Indian and Alaska Native	1	0.1%
Asian	1	0.1%
Native Hawaiian and Other Pacific Islander	0	0.0%
Some other race	2	0.2%
Two or more races	50	4.4%
Hispanic or Latino (of any race)	7	0.6%

=== 2010 census ===
As of the census of 2010, there were 1,184 people, 534 households, and 334 families living in the town. The population density was 1,517.9 inhabitants per square mile (586.1/km^{2}). There were 587 housing units at an average density of 752.6 per square mile (290.6/km^{2}). The racial makeup of the town was 98.7% White, 0.3% African American, 0.3% Asian, 0.2% from other races, and 0.6% from two or more races. Hispanic or Latino of any race were 1.0% of the population.

There were 534 households, of which 29.2% had children under the age of 18 living with them, 45.3% were married couples living together, 11.4% had a female householder with no husband present, 5.8% had a male householder with no wife present, and 37.5% were non-families. 34.1% of all households were made up of individuals, and 14.4% had someone living alone who was 65 years of age or older. The average household size was 2.22 and the average family size was 2.80.

The median age in the town was 41 years. 22.1% of residents were under the age of 18; 9.3% were between the ages of 18 and 24; 23.7% were from 25 to 44; 28% were from 45 to 64; and 17.1% were 65 years of age or older. The gender makeup of the town was 50.3% male and 49.7% female.

=== 2000 census ===
As of the census of 2000, there were 1,152 people, 507 households, and 337 families living in the town. The population density was 1,431.1 inhabitants per square mile (552.6/km^{2}). There were 563 housing units at an average density of 699.4 per square mile (270.0/km^{2}). The racial makeup of the town was 98.78% White, 0.17% Native American, 0.09% Asian, 0.09% from other races, and 0.87% from two or more races. Hispanic or Latino of any race were 0.35% of the population.

There were 507 households, out of which 29.0% had children under the age of 18 living with them, 50.1% were married couples living together, 12.6% had a female householder with no husband present, and 33.5% were non-families. 31.2% of all households were made up of individuals, and 11.2% had someone living alone who was 65 years of age or older. The average household size was 2.27 and the average family size was 2.82.

In the town, the population was spread out, with 22.7% under the age of 18, 9.9% from 18 to 24, 27.5% from 25 to 44, 25.4% from 45 to 64, and 14.5% who were 65 years of age or older. The median age was 39 years. For every 100 females, there were 88.2 males. For every 100 females age 18 and over, there were 90.8 males.

The median income for a household in the town was $31,250, and the median income for a family was $37,279. Males had a median income of $30,758 versus $21,650 for females. The per capita income for the town was $16,889. About 13.4% of families and 13.2% of the population were below the poverty line, including 17.9% of those under age 18 and 12.2% of those age 65 or over.

== Bibliography ==
History of Lawrence and Monroe Counties Indiana. Indianapolis: B. F. Bowen and Company. 1914.
