= Eureka, Lawrence County, Indiana =

Unincorporated community in Indiana, U.S.

Coordinates: 38°52′15″N 86°33′46″W

Eureka, also known as Geiberson, is an unincorporated community in Lawrence County, Indiana, in the United States.

== History ==
Eureka was founded in the early 19th century near the site of the Geiberson Stone Quarry. The Shiloh Church was built at this location sometime before 1840.

Eureka was said to be named for the discovery of a cellar of perishable foods and strong drink that was cached by the Daugherty family.
