= Zelma, Indiana =

- Unincorporated community
- Location within Indiana Location within the United States
- Coordinates: 38°56′02″N 86°18′07″W
- Country: United States
- State: Indiana
- County: Lawrence
- Township: Pleasant Run
- Elevation: 850 ft (260 m)
- ZIP code: 47436
- FIPS code: 18-86336
- GNIS feature ID: 451653

Zelma is an unincorporated community in Pleasant Run Township, Lawrence County, Indiana.

== History ==
Zelma was platted on May 23, 1890, by Stephen and James Fountain. Its name honors Zelma Fountain, daughter of a settler.
