= Shawswick Township, Lawrence County, Indiana =

Shawswick Township
- Township
- Location in Lawrence County
- Coordinates: 38°51′N 86°26′W
- Country: United States
- State: Indiana
- County: Lawrence

Government
  - Type: Indiana township
  - Trustee: Millard Jones

Area
  - Total: 69.87 sq mi (181.0 km^{2})
  - Land: 69.52 sq mi (180.1 km^{2})
  - Water: 0.34 sq mi (0.88 km^{2}) 0.49%
- Elevation: 686 ft (209 m)

Population (2020)
  - Total: 20,647
  - Density: 294.4/sq mi (113.7/km^{2})
- ZIP codes: 47421, 47436, 47451
- GNIS feature ID: 0453842

Shawswick Township is one of nine townships in Lawrence County, Indiana, United States. As of the 2010 census, its population was 20,469 and it contained 9,653 housing units.

== History ==
Shawswick Township was established in 1818. The township was named from a combination of the surnames Shaw and Wick. Wick was the name of a judge and Shaw was the name of a war hero; the final name Shawswick was formed in a compromise.

The Helton-Mayo Farm was listed in the National Register of Historic Places in 1995.

== Geography ==
According to the 2010 census, the township has a total area of 69.87 square miles (181.0 km^{2}), of which 69.52 square miles (180.1 km^{2}) (or 99.50%) is land and 0.34 square miles (0.88 km^{2}) (or 0.49%) is water.

=== Cities, towns, villages ===
- Bedford
- Oolitic (vast majority)

=== Unincorporated towns ===
- East Oolitic at 38.8989°N 86.5119°W
- Erie at 38.8826°N 86.3814°W

=== Cemeteries ===
The township contains these nine cemeteries: Beech Grove, Breckinridge, Crawford, Green Hill, Ikerd, Scoggan, Sherrill, Starr and Williams.

=== Major highways ===
- U.S. Route 50
- State Road 37
- State Road 54
- State Road 58

=== Airports and landing strips ===
- Virgil I Grissom Municipal Airport

== School districts ==
- North Lawrence Community Schools

== Political districts ==
- Indiana's 9th congressional district
- State House District 65
- State Senate District 44
