= List of Sigma Alpha Epsilon members =

Sigma Alpha Epsilon is a North American social college fraternity. It was founded at the University of Alabama in Tuscaloosa, Alabama, on March 9, 1856. This is a list of notable members of the fraternity Sigma Alpha Epsilon.

== Academia and educator ==
- Hurst Robins Anderson – president of Centenary University, Hamline University, and American University
- Paul R. Anderson – president of Chatham University and Temple University
- Milton Eisenhower – president Kansas State University, president Johns Hopkins University
- James M. Farr – president of the University of Florida
- Mike Feinberg – co-founder of the KIPP (Knowledge Is Power Program)
- Bruce Grube – president of Georgia Southern University
- Ralph Cooper Hutchinson – president of Washington & Jefferson College
- Richard Kinney—president of Hadley School for the Blind
- Dan Papp – president of Kennesaw State University
- Luis Proenza- president of University of Akron
- Clemmie Spangler – served as president of the University of North Carolina system )(1986–1997)

== Business ==
- Josh Abramson – founder of CollegeHumor, University of Richmond
- Keith Barr - current CEO and President of CarMax, Cornell University
- John F. Barrett – chairman, president and chief executive officer of Western & Southern Financial Group, University of Cincinnati
- John Bugas – former vice president – Ford Motor Company University of Wyoming
- John T. Chambers – CEO and Chairman of Cisco Systems, Duke University
- Joe Craft – President, Alliance Resource Partners, L.P., funded Joe Craft Center Kentucky Basketball Facilities at University of Kentucky, philanthropist
- Cecil B. Day – founder of Days Inn, Georgia Institute of Technology
- John Thompson Dorrance – founder of Campbell's Soup, MIT
- Fred Ehrsam – co-founder of Coinbase, Duke University
- David Einhorn – president, Greenlight Capital, Cornell University
- Scott T. Ford – CEO, Alltel Wireless, University of Arkansas
- Paul L. Foster – president and CEO of Western Refining, Baylor University
- J. B. Fuqua – former businessman and philanthropist. The Fuqua School of Business at Duke University is named after him
- Bowman Gray Sr. – former president and chairman of R.J. Reynolds Tobacco Company, UNC Chapel Hill
- Josh Harris – co-founder of Apollo Global Management and owner of several sports teams
- George Watts Hill – banker, hospital administrator, and philanthropist, UNC Chapel Hill
- Paul Tudor Jones – founder of the Tudor Investment Corporation, University of Virginia
- Steve Lacy – president and CEO, Meredith Corporation, Kansas State University
- David S. Lewis – former chairman and CEO, General Dynamics Corporation, Georgia Tech
- Lewis Bergman Maytag (Iowa State, 1910) – Maytag Corporation president
- Aubrey McClendon – co-founder and CEO of Chesapeake Energy Corporation, Duke University
- John Motley Morehead III – Developed foundation of Union Carbide Company, Lifetime philanthropist UNC Chapel Hill
- Doug Oberhelman - former CEO and Executive Chairman of Caterpillar Inc., Millikin University
- William Perez – former CEO, Wm. Wrigley Jr. Company and Nike, Inc., Cornell University
- Ross Perot Jr. – businessman and real estate developer, chairman of Perot Systems, Vanderbilt University
- T. Boone Pickens – chairman, Mesa Petroleum, Oklahoma State University
- Charles Price II – chairman and CEO – Price Candy Company, University of Missouri
- Dan Rapoport – financier and philanthropist, president of Rapoport Capital, University of Houston
- William Spell – founder and current president of Spell Capital Partners, University of Minnesota
- Chris Sullivan, founder Outback Steakhouse, University of Kentucky
- William T. Young – businessman, founder and former CEO of JIF, University of Kentucky

== Entertainment ==
=== Television and film ===
- George Bodenheimer – president of ESPN Inc. and ESPN on ABC
- Beau Bridges – actor, UCLA
- Lloyd Bridges – actor, UCLA
- Dave Campbell – ESPN baseball broadcaster, University of Michigan
- Danny Lee Clark – Nitro from the original American Gladiators, San Jose State University
- Sandro Corsaro – producer/TV show creator University of Southern California
- James Denton – actor – Desperate Housewives, University of Tennessee
- Sam Elliott – actor, Cal State L.A.
- Bob Eubanks – television personality, game show host
- Barry Fanaro – screenwriter, The Golden Girls, Kingpin, Mercer University
- Carmen Finestra – television producer and writer (The Cosby Show, Home Improvement), Penn State University
- Ron Franklin – ESPN college football and basketball broadcaster, University of Mississippi
- Gregory Thomas Garcia – creator and producer My Name is Earl, Yes, Dear, Frostburg State University
- Terry Gilliam – film director, member of Monty Python, Occidental College
- Bob Goen – former co-host of Entertainment Tonight, San Diego State University
- Philip Graham – former publisher of the Washington Post and Newsweek, University of Florida
- John Lee Hancock – film director, The Blind Side, Baylor University
- Ernie Harwell – former baseball broadcaster for the Detroit Tigers, Emory University
- Ed Hinton – ESPN NASCAR columnist, University of Southern Mississippi
- Chet Huntley – NBC news anchor Montana State University
- Paul James – actor, television show Greek, Syracuse University
- Richard Kind – actor, Spin City, Northwestern University
- Steven Levitan – writer/producer University of Wisconsin-Madison
- Matt Long – actor, Western Kentucky University
- David McKenna – writer/producer of Blow, American History X, San Diego State University
- Ross Porter – former baseball announcer for the Los Angeles Dodgers, University of Oklahoma
- Pat Robertson – media mogul, televangelist, political commentator Washington and Lee University
- Michael Rosenbaum – actor, Lex Luthor: Smallville, Western Kentucky University
- Hughes Rudd – CBS News anchor, correspondent, University of Missouri
- Ryen Russillo – co-host of The Scott Van Pelt Show on ESPN Radio, University of Vermont
- Fred Savage – actor, known for the Wonder Years, Stanford University
- Grant Shaud – actor on Murphy Brown, University of Richmond
- Mike Song – dancer, founder of Kaba Modern University of California, Irvine
- David Spade – actor known for Saturday Night Live, Arizona State University
- Kevin Tighe – actor, University of Southern California
- Casper Van Dien – actor Starship Troopers, Beverly Hills 90210 Florida State University
- Ed Wilson – president of Tribune Broadcasting, former president of Fox Television, NBC Enterprises, and CBS Enterprises, University of Arkansas
- Robert S. Woods – actor One Life to Live Long Beach State University
- Robert Young – Actor – Father Knows Best, Marcus Welby, MD Depauw University

=== Music ===
- Glen Ballard – veteran songwriter and producer, University of Mississippi
- Dierks Bentley – country music singer University of Vermont
- Jimmy Dunne – songwriter, recording artist, composer, film and television producer, University of Kentucky
- Bobby Hatfield – singer, the Righteous Brothers, California State University Long Beach
- Nick Lachey – singer and former husband of Jessica Simpson, Miami University
- George McConnell – former guitarist for Widespread Panic, University of Mississippi
- Quinn XCII, songwriter and musician, Michigan State University
- Matt Stillwell – country music artist, songwriter Western Carolina University
- Bobby Troup – musician, songwriter University of Pennsylvania
- Rudy Vallée – singer, actor, and entertainer, University of Maine, Yale University
- Christian Talcott Webster (Chris Webby) - independent hip hop artist, Hofstra University

== Law ==
- Bruce Castor – former solicitor general and acting attorney general of Pennsylvania, Lafayette College
- Andrew O. Holmes – Associate Justice of the Tennessee Supreme Court
- L.Q.C. Lamar – Statesman (D), Justice of US Supreme Court, University of Mississippi
- Richard Scruggs – Lawyer, University of Mississippi

== Literature and journalism ==
- George Abbe – poet and author, University of New Hampshire
- Sandro Corsaro – author and animator
- Ross M. Dick – journalist at The Milwaukee Journal and fourth president of the Society for Advancing Business Editing and Writing
- William Faulkner – Nobel Prize-winning author, University of Mississippi
- John Jakes – author, DePauw University
- James J. Kilpatrick – syndicated newspaper columnist, author, University of Missouri
- Albert Jay Nock – author and social critic
- Walker Percy – author, UNC Chapel Hill
- Ernie Pyle – Pulitzer Prize-winning World War II journalist, Indiana University
- Charles Strum – Associate managing editor for the New York Times, Dickinson College
- Curtis Wilkie - Newspaper reporter, college professor and historian, University of Mississippi
- Stuart Woods – author, University of Georgia

== Military ==
- Charles C. Campbell, USA (Ret.) – US Army general (retired), former FORSCOM commander, Louisiana State University
- Dana T. Merrill – United States Army brigadier general
- Richard Myers – former chairman, Joint Chief of Staff, Kansas State University
- Arlo L. Olson – United States Army Captain, Awarded the Medal of Honor for his actions in World War II, University of South Dakota
- Edmund Kirby Smith – general, Confederate States of America, The University of the South
- Seymour W. Terry – United States Army Captain, World War II Medal of Honor Recipient, University of Arkansas
- William Peterkin Upshur – United States Marine Corps Major General, Awarded the Medal of Honor for his actions in World War I, Virginia Military Institute

== Politics ==
=== President ===
- William McKinley – Twenty-fifth President of the United States (R), Mount Union College

=== U.S. Senate ===
- Max Baucus – U.S. Senator from Montana (D), Stanford University
- J.C.W. Beckham – former U.S. Senator from Kentucky (D); youngest Governor of Kentucky; namesake of Beckham County, Oklahoma, Centre College
- Dennis Chavez – former U.S. Senator from New Mexico University of New Mexico
- Jim DeMint – former U.S. Senator from South Carolina (R), University of Tennessee
- Pete Domenici – former U.S. Senator from New Mexico (R), University of New Mexico
- Peter Fitzgerald – former U.S. Senator from Illinois (R), Dartmouth College
- John J. Hickey – former Wyoming governor and U.S. Senator (D), University of Wyoming
- Johnny Isakson – U.S. Senator from Georgia (R), University of Georgia
- Connie Mack III – former Florida U.S. Senator (R), University of Florida
- Larry Pressler – former South Dakota U.S. Senator (R), University of South Dakota
- David Pryor – former Arkansas Governor and U.S. Senator (D), University of Arkansas
- Mark Pryor – U.S. Senator from Arkansas (D), University of Arkansas
- Richard Russell – former US Senator from Georgia University of Georgia
- George Smathers- former U.S. Senator and Congressman from Florida (D), philanthropist, University of Florida

=== U.S. House of Representatives ===
- Bill Archer – former U.S. Representative (R), chairman of the House Ways and Means Committee, University of Texas at Austin
- Andy Barr – US Representative from Kentucky (R) University of Virginia
- Mike Bishop – US Representative from Michigan (R), former Michigan State Senate Majority Leader (R), University of Michigan
- David E. Bonior – former US Representative from Michigan (D), University of Iowa
- Allen Boyd – former US Representative from Florida (D), Florida State University
- Jay Dickey – Former US Representative from Arkansas (R), University of Arkansas
- David Dreier – US Representative from California (R), University of La Verne
- Thomas W. Ewing – former US Representative from Illinois (R), Millikin University
- Paul Gillmor – former US Representative from Ohio (R), Ohio Wesleyan University
- George Gekas – former US Representative from Pennsylvania (R), Dickinson College
- Hamilton C. Jones – former US Representative from North Carolina (D) UNC Chapel Hill
- Adam Kinzinger – US Representative from Illinois (R), Illinois State University
- J. Alex McMillan – former US Representative from North Carolina (R), UNC Chapel Hill
- Gilbert Brown Patterson – former US Congressman from North Carolina (D) UNC Chapel Hill
- Ralph Regula – former US Congressman from Ohio (R), Mount Union College
- John Shadegg – former US Congressman from Arizona (R), University of Arizona
- Charles Walter "Charlie" Stenholm – former US Congressman from Texas (D), Texas Tech University
- Brad Wenstrup – current US Congressman from Ohio (R) University of Cincinnati

=== Governors ===
- Sherman Adams – former Governor of New Hampshire (R); Representative from New Hampshire's 2nd District; White House Chief of Staff, Dartmouth College
- Haley Barbour – former Governor of Mississippi (R); former chairman of the Republican National Committee, Former White House Aid to President Ronald Reagan (R) University of Mississippi
- Robert D. Blue – former Governor of Iowa (R), Drake University
- Doug Burgum – former Governor of North Dakota (R); current Secretary of the Department of the Interior, North Dakota State University
- Frank G. Clement - former Governor of Tennessee (D), Cumberland University
- Joe Foss – former South Dakota Governor (R); Medal of Honor recipient; leading USMC ace pilot, 1st Commissioner of the AFL, former NRA President, University of South Dakota
- Albert W. Gilchrist – former Florida Governor (D), Carolina Military Institute
- William L. Guy – former North Dakota Governor (D), North Dakota State University
- Gary Johnson – former Governor of New Mexico (R) and Presidential candidate (L), University of New Mexico
- Paul B. Johnson, Jr. – former Governor of Mississippi (D), University of Mississippi
- John Lynch – former Governor of New Hampshire (D), University of New Hampshire
- Sidney S. McMath – former Governor of Arkansas (D), Marine General & Renowned Trial Lawyer, University of Arkansas
- Robert D. Ray – former Governor of Iowa (R), Drake University
- Richard Riley – former US Secretary of Education, Former Governor of South Carolina (D), Furman University
- Brian Sandoval – former Governor of Nevada (R), University of Nevada

=== Other federal ===
- Todd Blodgett – Member of White House staff (Reagan-Bush) 1985–87. Served on the Bush-Quayle '88 campaign committee. Also worked with the FBI
- Donald Evans – former US Secretary of Commerce, University of Texas at Austin
- Robert E. Lamb – United States Foreign Service, University of Pennsylvania
- Wilson Livingood – Sergeant at Arms of the United States House of Representatives, Michigan State University
- Andrew McCabe – Director of the Federal Bureau of Investigation, Duke University
- Eliot Ness – Prohibition agent, University of Chicago
- Henry Paulson – former U.S. Treasury Secretary, Former CEO of Goldman Sachs Group, Dartmouth College
- Charles Price II – former Ambassador to the United Kingdom University of Missouri

=== State politics ===
- John R. Bell, IV – House Majority Whip, 10th NC House District, North Carolina House of Representatives (R) University of North Carolina at Wilmington
- Joseph Peltier – North Dakota House of Representatives and North Dakota State Board of Higher Education
- Kenneth Schissler – former Maryland State Delegate (R), Salisbury State University
- Mark Taylor – former Georgia State Senator representing the 12th District, Former Lieutenant Governor of Georgia, Emory University
- Louis R. Tobacco – New York State Assemblyman representing Staten Island's 62nd District (R), University at Albany
- Guy Vander Linden – a member of the Iowa Legislature and former brigadier general, US Marines, University of Iowa

=== Local politics ===
- Ivan Allen Jr. – former mayor of Atlanta (D), Georgia Tech
- Michael Geppi – former Harford County Councilman (R), Towson University
- Joe Hogsett – Current mayor of Indianapolis (D), Indiana University
- Carl T. Langford – former mayor of Orlando (D), University of Florida
- Svante Myrick – former mayor of Ithaca, New York (D), Cornell University
- Jerry Sanders – former mayor of San Diego (R), San Diego State University
- James R. Williams – Selectman, Belmont, MA, Indiana University

=== Other politics ===
- George Gallup – creator of Gallup Poll, University of Iowa

== Science ==
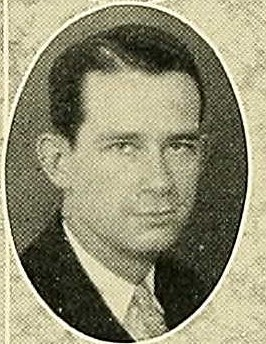
Leslie Vaughn Rush, orthopedic surgeon and inventor of the Rush pin

- Robert Ballard – oceanographer, explorer, discovered the wreckage of the RMS Titanic in 1985, Bismarck in 1989, and the Roman trading ship Isis, University of California, Santa Barbara
- Steve Fossett – aviator and adventurer, Stanford University
- Robert H. Goddard – father of modern controlled rocketry, Worcester Polytechnic Institute
- Eldon W. Joersz – American pilot, who jointly holds the Flight airspeed record, North Dakota State University
- William B. Lenoir – NASA astronaut, MIT
- John Motley Morehead III – noted chemist, work led to notable business success in Union Carbide Company UNC Chapel Hill
- William Oefelein – NASA astronaut, Oregon State University
- Leslie Vaughn Rush – a surgeon who revolutionized the treatment of bone fractures
- Joseph Strauss – Engineer and designer of the Golden Gate Bridge, University of Cincinnati

== Sports ==
=== Baseball ===
- Harry Agganis – Boston University football All American, Boston Red Sox 1B, "The Golden Greek", Boston University
- Scott Boras – pro baseball agent, University of the Pacific
- Avery Brundage – Olympics, pentathlon, decathlon, International Olympic Committee, president, 1936–1972, University of Illinois
- Ken Caminiti – professional baseball player, San Jose State University
- Jason Castro – #10 Pick in 2008 MLB Draft Stanford UniversityHouston Astros
- Scott Forster – Montreal Expos pitcher, James Madison University
- David Freese – St. Louis Cardinals third baseman, University of Missouri
- John Gall – Florida Marlins minor league outfielder Stanford University
- Ryan Garko – San Francisco Giants first baseman, Stanford University
- Mike Gosling – Toronto Blue Jays minor league pitcher, Stanford University
- Joey Hamilton – San Diego Padres pitcher, Georgia Southern University
- Mike Hubbard – Chicago Cubs catcher, James Madison University
- Mark Lamping – president of the St. Louis Cardinals and CEO of the Meadowlands Stadium Company, Rockhurst University
- Doc Marshall – New York Giants infielder, University of Mississippi
- Kevin McClatchy – CEO and majority owner of the Pittsburgh Pirates, University of California, Santa Barbara
- Graig Nettles – Major League Baseball player, San Diego State University
- Greg Reynolds – Colorado Rockies pitcher, Stanford University
- Clint Robinson – Pittsburgh Pirates Major League first baseman Troy University
- Walt Terrell – professional baseball player, Morehead State University

=== Basketball ===
- Terry Dischinger – professional basketball player, Purdue University, Chicago Zephyrs, Baltimore Bullets, Detroit Pistons
- Mike Gminski – professional basketball player, Duke University
- Kevin Grevey – professional basketball player, University of Kentucky
- Jud Heathcote – former Michigan State University Basketball Coach, Washington State University
- Phil Jackson – professional basketball coach, University of North Dakota
- "Pistol Pete" Maravich – professional basketball player, Louisiana State University
- Gregg Marshall – former coach, Wichita State University
- Jon McGlocklin – professional basketball player, Indiana University, Cincinnati Royals, San Diego Rockets, Milwaukee Bucks
- Jack Twyman – professional basketball player, University of Cincinnati, Cincinnati Royals
- Dick Van Arsdale – professional basketball player, Indiana University, New York Knickerbockers, Phoenix Suns
- Tom Van Arsdale – professional basketball player, Indiana University, Detroit Pistons, Cincinnati Royals, Kansas City-Omaha Kings, Philadelphia 76ers, Atlanta Hawks, Phoenix Suns

=== Football (American) ===
- Troy Aikman – Dallas Cowboys Super Bowl MVP Quarterback and Hall of Famer, UCLA
- Chris Ault – University of Nevada-Reno football coach, University of Nevada
- Bradford Banta – professional football player, USC, 1993
- Bob Biggs – football player and coach, UC Davis, 1993
- John Billman – football player, AAFC, University of Minnesota
- Tony Boselli – professional football player, University of Southern California
- Doug Brien – former NFL place-kicker, University of California, Berkeley
- Mack Brown – University of Texas at Austin football coach, Florida State University
- Pete Carroll – Seattle Seahawks football coach, University of the Pacific
- Terry Cole – football player, Indiana University, Baltimore Colts, Miami Dolphins
- Kyle Cook – former NFL center for Cincinnati Bengals, Michigan State University
- Doug Dickey – football coach at University of Tennessee and University of Florida
- Paul Dietzel – football coach at Louisiana State University, Miami University
- Bill Dudley – NFL Pro Football Hall of Fame running back for the Pittsburgh Steelers, Detroit Lions, and Washington Redskins, University of Virginia
- Francis A. "Mother" Dunn, Former halfback for the Canton Bulldogs, Dickinson College
- Dennis Erickson – football coach, Montana State University
- Josh Harris - Majority Owner, Washington Commanders - University of Pennsylvania
- Hunter Henry- tight end of New England Patriots, University of Arkansas Mackey Award Winner
- Kevin Hogan – quarterback of Kansas City Chiefs, Stanford University
- Link Lyman – Pro Football Hall of Fame tackle, Super Bowl champion, University of Nebraska
- Tom Mack – Pro Football Hall of Fame Offensive Guard, University of Michigan
- Tommy Mason – football player, Tulane University, Minnesota Vikings
- Christian McCaffrey – Heisman Trophy finalist running back, Stanford University, running back San Francisco 49ers
- Ed McCaffrey – Professional football player, Stanford University
- Greg McElroy – University of Alabama QB 2009 National Champions, NFL QB for the Cincinnati Bengals
- Davis Mills – Professional football player, Stanford University
- Tom Moore – Assistant Head Coach/Offense, Arizona Cardinals, University of Iowa
- Don Nehlen – former head football coach at West Virginia University, Bowling Green State University
- John Offerdahl – former NFL linebacker, Western Michigan University
- Carson Palmer – quarterback of Arizona Cardinals, University of Southern California
- Todd Peterson – former NFL place-kicker, University of Georgia
- Matt Prater – NFL Kicker for the Detroit Lions, University of Central Florida
- Peter Pund – Captain and Center for the 1928 Georgia Tech Yellow Jackets football team, member of the College Football Hall of Fame
- Josh Rosen – Free agent NFL quarterback most recently for Cleveland Browns former quarterback of University of California, Los Angeles
- Bo Schembechler – former University of Michigan football coach, Miami University
- Adam Seward – linebacker for the Carolina Panthers, University of Nevada, Las Vegas
- Kirby Smart – University of Georgia football head coach, University of Georgia
- Dennis K. "Dutch" Stanley – Football coach at University of Florida
- Drew Stanton – Arizona Cardinals quarterback and former Detroit Lions quarterback, Michigan State University
- Everett Strupper – College Football Hall of Fame halfback, Georgia Institute of Technology
- Barry Switzer – former football coach University of Oklahoma and Dallas Cowboys, University of Oklahoma, honorary
- Fran Tarkenton- quarterback of Minnesota Vikings and New York Giants, University of Georgia
- Denny Thum – president of the Kansas City Chiefs Rockhurst University
- David Treadwell – former NFL kicker, Clemson University
- DeMarcus Walker – Defensive End, Chicago Bears, Florida State University
- Lloyd Yoder – College Football Hall of Fame tackle, Carnegie Mellon University

=== Golf ===
- Andy Bean – golf announcer, player on the PGA Champions Tour, University of Florida
- Bob Gilder – golfer, PGA Champions Tour, Arizona State University
- Bobby Jones – famous amateur golfer/lawyer, founder of Augusta National Golf Club and the Masters Tournament, Georgia Tech
- Gary Koch – golfer, sportscaster, course designer, University of Florida
- Steve Melnyk – golfer, University of Florida
- Bob Murphy – golfer, long-time sports announcer, NCAA Golf individual champion, US Amateur champion, University of Florida
- Tom Purtzer – golfer, PGA Champions Tour, Arizona State University

=== Soccer ===
- Femi Hollinger-Janzen – soccer forward for New England Revolution, Indiana University
- Chris Pontius – soccer forward for D.C. United, University of California, Santa Barbara

=== Tennis ===
- Bob Bryan – tennis player, Stanford University
- Mike Bryan – tennis player, Stanford University
- Bradley Klahn – tennis player, Stanford University
- Patrick McEnroe – tennis professional, Stanford University

=== Other sports ===
- Bob Baffert – Triple Crown winning trainer, University of Arizona
- Andy Douglas – professional wrestler, Morehead State University
- Joey Gilbert – professional boxer, University of Nevada
- Jimmie Heuga – first American Olympic skier to medal University of Colorado at Boulder
- Charles Jock – middle-distance runner, University of California, Irvine
- Ron Mason – former college hockey coach and athletic director at Michigan State University
- Wally Ris – two-time Olympic gold medalist in swimming, University of Iowa
- Dave Shondell – head volleyball coach at Purdue University, Ball State
