= Geraldine Lawhorn =

American deafblind woman, actress and pianist (1916–2016)

Geraldine Jerrie Lawhorn
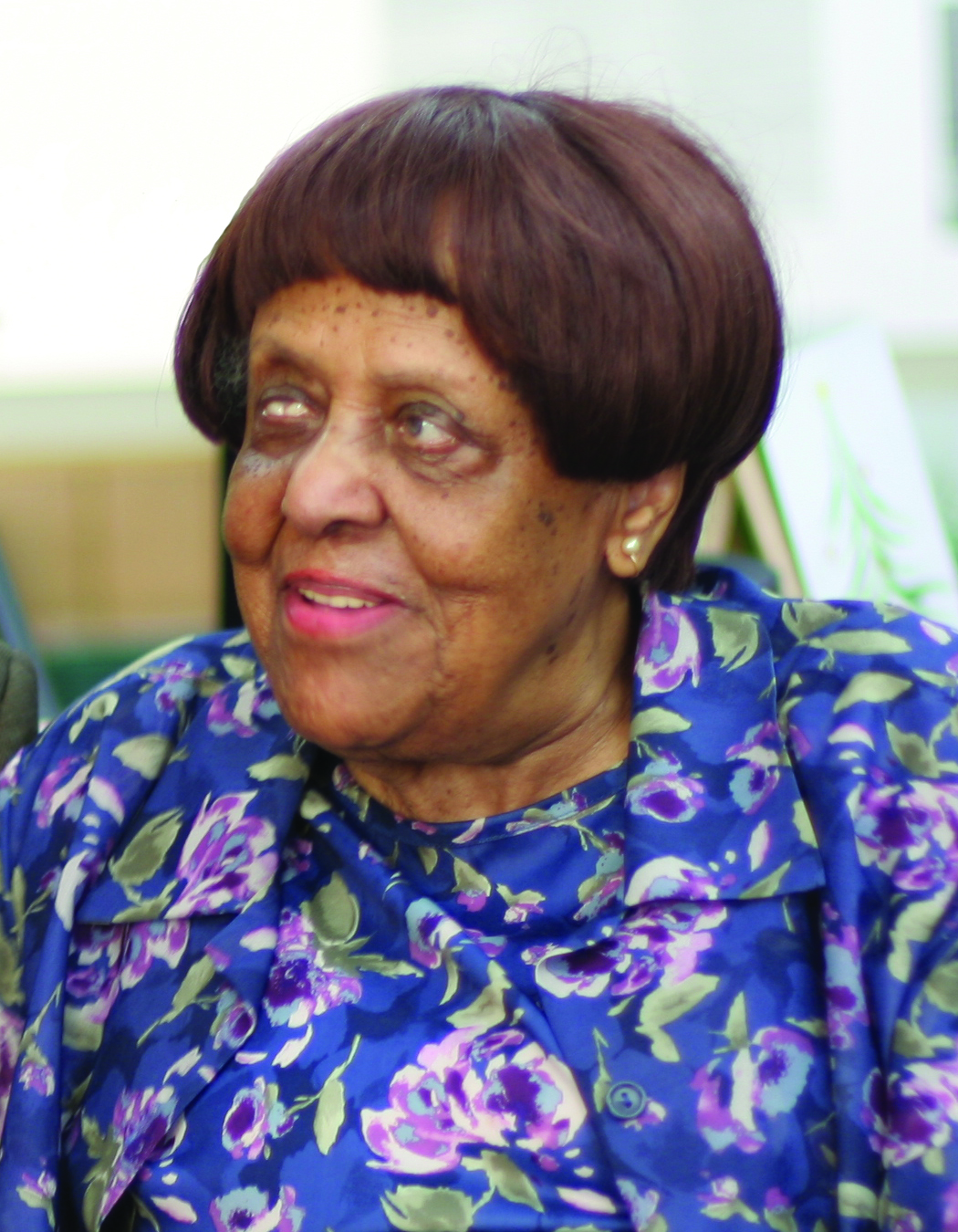
- Born: Geraldine Jerry Lawhorn; December 31, 1916; Dayton, Ohio
- Died: July 3, 2016 (aged 99); Chicago, Illinois
- Occupations: One-woman show performer, instructor at the Hadley Institute for the Blind and Visually Impaired
- Known for: One of first deafblind African American people to obtain a bachelor degree

Geraldine Jerrie Lawhorn (December 31, 1916 – July 3, 2016) was an American deafblind performer, actress, pianist, and educator. She taught at the Hadley Institute for the Blind and Visually Impaired and was a prominent figure in the deafblind community. At 67 years old, she became the first deafblind African American in the United States to earn a college degree.

== Biography ==
=== Early life ===
Geraldine Jerrie Lawhorn was born on December 31, 1916, in Dayton, Ohio, to Pearl Walker and William Bert Lawhorn. Her parents were musicians, and at the time, the managers of a movie theater in Dayton. She had two older brothers, Melvin and Wendell Lawhorn.

Geraldine spent her childhood between Dayton and Chicago. When she was eighteen months old, her family settled in Chicago, where they started a confectioner's trade business. After her parents' divorce in 1922, Geraldine returned to Dayton with her mother and started elementary school. However, a traumatizing experience compelled them to move back to Chicago, where she lived with her mother and her brothers. During the Great Depression, which started in 1929, the Lawhorns went through financial hardships. Pearl Walker opened a beauty shop in their apartment to earn some money and have time to take care of her children.

=== Handicap and school ===
Geraldine was about eight years old when doctors discovered she had an eye condition. She could not see well, and faced difficulties to read. Geraldine attended many church meetings because her parents thought religion could help her. At twelve years old, Geraldine lost her sight, but she could still perceive some glimmer of light. Doctors never found the cause of her blindness. As a result, she attended the Sight-Saving Room of the Sherwood Grammar School which provided some accommodations for the visually impaired pupils. Geraldine had to learn the braille language, but still had classes with sighted students. Her integration at school was not easy: in eighth grade, her classmates booed, stigmatized, and discriminated against her.

Then, Geraldine attended the Braille Department of Marshall High School. She became interested in writing and public speaking. She won several prizes for her short stories. She decided to change her name from "Jerry" to "Jerrie" because she wanted it to seem French. As for the sight, Jerrie progressively lost her hearing capacities. Therefore, she had to learn a new mode of communication: the One-Hand Alphabet, and joined a special academic program in the Braille Room. This situation did not prevent her from improving her writing skills. She won a writing contest in Chicago after presenting her short story Gift. She also wrote a novel entitled The Needle Swingers' Baby.

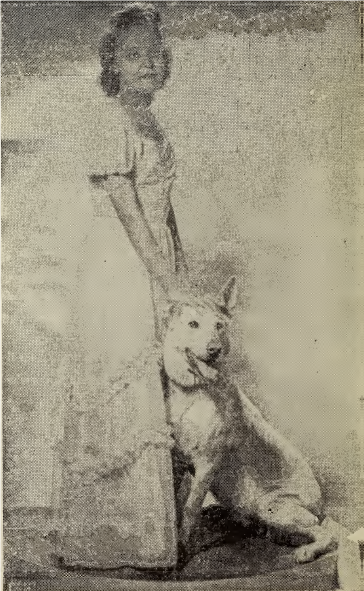
Geraldine Lawhorn and her dog Blondie before 1954

=== Artistic years ===
Geraldine graduated with honors from high school. However, she did not have plans to further her education. She received a scholarship from the Alpha Kappa Alpha sorority and decided to take a correspondence course in short-story writing offered by Columbia University. The Hadley Institute for the Blind and Visually Impaired provided the braille material for the course. At the time, the Catholic Youth Organization conducted an experiment to see if dogs were able to lead blind people. Jerrie volunteered to participate and received a dog, Blondie. After a couple of months, she could keep it with her.

At 19 years old, Jerrie completely lost her hearing. Doctors credited this handicap with measles she contracted when she turned five. It was an emotionally painful situation. Nonetheless, Jerrie did not stay idle; instead, she became involved in many activities. She attended the monthly meetings of the Fellowship Circle of the Blind, where she discovered drama performance and started writing plays for the fellowship programs. The young lady performed her first full-length dramatic recital on May 2, 1940, at Poro College.

Geraldine desired attending college but she was refused many scholarships due to her handicaps. She decided to develop her artistic skills instead. She received a grant from the scholarship committee in Springfield to take private lessons in theater arts. Thus, she attended three days a week the dramatic department of the Chicago Piano College. Bessie Henderson, the head of the Drama Division of the school and an alumna from Northwestern University, taught her creative writing, diction, public speaking, and acting. Geraldine also had music lessons once a week. It was challenging since she could not hear the piano, but she reported feeling its vibrations.

In 1942, Geraldine was admitted to the American Conservatory of Music in Chicago, where she studied for four years. She performed monologues at the United Service Organizations programs. She also volunteered in the Red Cross sewing division and received a medal for her dedication. The Blind Service Association selected Jerrie to audition for Reuben's Amateur Hour on one of the Chicago's leading stations. She did not win the prize but became popular. She appeared on television programs like Someone You Should Know, The Phil Donahue Show, and Ripley's Believe It or Not.

=== Personal life and artistic break ===
At her 25th birthday party, Geraldine met Hap, a friend of her brother. When she married Hap, she stopped her artistic activities to take care of her household despite the opposition of her mother. In 1944, Geraldine and Hap divorced, after six months of physical separation. She reported that the lack of communication destroyed their marriage. Jerrie later thought that getting married was a mistake. She never married again.

=== New York City and the one-woman show years (1946–1966) ===
In 1946, with anxiety and excitement, Geraldine and her mother left Chicago for New York City. They settled in Queens, to Frank Wilson's house, a Broadway actor playing in Watch on the Rhine and known to help young talents find success. Blondie was supposed to join them after. However, Geraldine learned by telegram that her dog died from a cerebral hemorrhage. She was sad and depressed for a long time. Wilson gave Geraldine opportunities to perform on stage. Her first performance in New York City was at his church and her second at Carnegie Recital Hall. She also met backstage the actors Ezio Pinza, Mary Martin and Juanita Hall after attending performance of South Pacific. Geraldine and her mother were supposed to stay only a summer in the city but her increasing notoriety compelled them to stay two years with Wilson.

Jerrie did not have a manager. She and Pearl Walker were in charge of her career. The income from the shows allowed her to have private lessons in theater. She also took speech lessons to control her pitch. Pearl Walker and Frank Wilson collected the audience's comments backstage to help Geraldine improve herself. New Yorker street artists, her surroundings, and her everyday life inspired her for her shows. Geraldine's one woman show was entitled: Projected Hearts. Jerrie rented evenings at Carnegie Recital Hall and dedicated her shows to Frank Wilson, after he died. She was part of the Celestial Choral Ensemble of the Blind, which presented two concerts at the New York World's Fair in 1964. She was the emcee during these concerts. Her favorite activities included shopping and attending Broadway shows with her mother. At Christmas time, both women used to visit the Rockefeller Center and the Radio City Music Hall.

In 1948, after Wilson got married, Geraldine and her mother left his house. Because they did not want to leave the city, they went through the perilous apartment search process. They applied to the Housing Authority, and found an apartment in Long Island City. For the moving-in, Geraldine and her mother received help from their former neighbors, who offered them furniture, including a piano. Both women received a monthly allowance from their family in Chicago. Jerrie was involved in many civic activities. She joined a program for disabled adults, in which she learned swimming, bowling, ceramics, aerobics, and social dancing – like rumba, mambo, tango, and paso doble. She took piano lessons offered by the association and learned to read braille music notation. These new skills opened to her the doors of the New York College of Music where she studied piano techniques.

By this time, only three deafblind people had received a college degree: Helen Keller, Robert Smithdas, and Richard Kinney, president of the International Hadley Institute for the Blind and Visually Impaired. Besides her artistic career and courses, Jerrie wanted to earn a college degree. However, her advisor recommended that she use her scholarship to improve her theater skills. Therefore, she enrolled at the Brown Adams Professional Actors Studio, off Broadway. Geraldine appeared on daytime television shows and won several awards, like the Award of the Best One-Woman show by trade magazine Show Business. Ebony magazine wrote an eight-page article about her life. Jerrie was also columnist for braille magazines and wrote short stories for Skylark.

In 1966, Geraldine was invited to the 100th birthday anniversary of Anne Sullivan, instructor of Helen Keller. The Perkins School for the Blind and the Industrial Home for the Blind sponsored the Centennial Commemoration at the Washington National Cathedral. This night, eight deafblind adults, including Geraldine Lawhorn and Richard Kinney, received the Anne Sullivan Gold Medal. During the event, Kinney invited Geraldine to become an instructor at the Hadley School for a new correspondence course. She did not give an answer after receiving the school invitation letter. She felt perplexed and confused. On the one hand, she did not want to abandon her career, and felt like part of the New York City community. On the other hand, she worried about her mother who had recently turned 76 and needed to retire near her family. She finally accepted the teaching proposal.

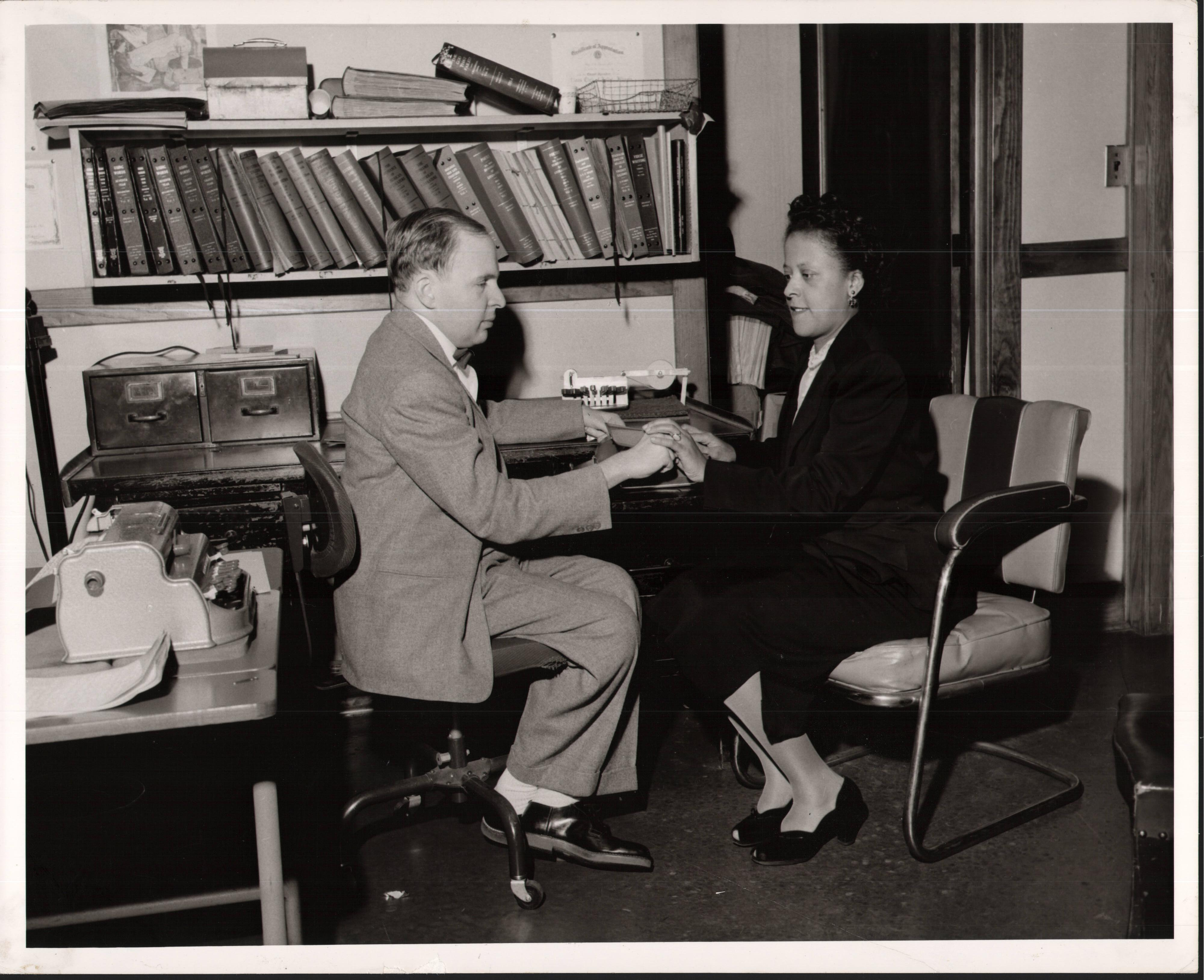
Geraldine Lawhorn and Richard Kinney signing

=== Return to Chicago ===
In 1967, Pearl Walker and her daughter went back to Chicago, as the Hadley School confirmed Geraldine's employment. She did not immediately start her position. Indeed, she participated in a training program, offered by the Anne Sullivan Macy Program, known today as the Helen Keller National Center for the Deaf-Blind Youths and Adults, in Jamaica, New York. Afterwards, she started teaching two correspondence courses: "Independent Living for Those Without Sight or Hearing" and "Verse Writing and Poetry". The poetry courses were free, and twenty-four students signed up.

Geraldine occasionally attended the staff meetings and conferences in Winnetka. Geraldine and Richard Kinney became good friends, and he was a source of inspiration. Geraldine's one stage appearances did not stop after she became an instructor. She still gave presentations to service clubs, conventions, and seminars. She was the keynote speaker at the Second International Conference of the Association for Education and Rehabilitation of the Blind and Visually Impaired at Chicago's McCormick Center Hotel.

Less than two years after they settled in Chicago, Pearl Walker had a stroke and was hospitalized for thirty days. The attack left her paralyzed on the left side. She had to undergo months of rehabilitation, which consisted of therapeutic exercises with a nurse's aid five times a week. Geraldine's family were supportive during this phase. Geraldine used the Vibralert and the Tactile Speech to communicate with her mother. She and her sister-in-law, Helen Lawhorn, organized Pearl's 81st birthday party. However, in 1972, Pearl had another stroke, and died on October 11, 1972. After the death of her mother, Geraldine started using new equipment to be more independent: the Code-Com telephone attachment for the deafblind, a Signal Master that activated electric appliances when the telephone rang, and an Optacon given by the Hadley School to read inkprint material.

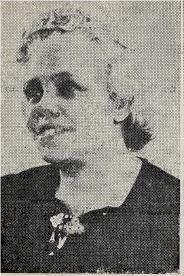
Pearl Walker, mother of Geraldine Lawhorn before 1954

Furthermore, Geraldine remained very active. She attended the convention of the American Association of the Deaf-Blind at the University of Washington, along with 175 other deafblind people. She was present at the 80th birthday ceremony of Helen Keller organized by the Industrial Home for the Blind in Brooklyn. She went to Helen Keller's one-hundredth birthday on June 27, 1980, at The Helen Keller Centennial Congress in Boston, MA. Geraldine also worked with elderly people and deafblind families, and was very supportive.

=== College degree ===
Obtaining a college degree was a great challenge for Geraldine, and she was determined to make it. Through a friend, she learned about the University Without Walls program that many colleges offered. She applied to this program and was accepted at Northeastern Illinois University.

On March 23, 1983, Geraldine presented her narrative abstract before a committee and passed her examinations. She earned her bachelor's degree in rehabilitation of deafblind adults from Northeastern Illinois University. The commencement ceremony took place on June 12, 1983, and three television channels videoed it. Thus, Geraldine became at 67 the first deafblind African-American person to graduate from college. She became as well the sixth deafblind person in the United States to earn that achievement.

Three days after, the new graduate flew with a friend to New York City, where David Hartman interviewed her on the nationwide television show Good Morning America. On June 17, 1983, Geraldine received a letter from President Reagan congratulating her on her degree. After that, Zig Ziglar quoted Geraldine as a model of perseverance in his book Steps to the Top, published in 1985. Geraldine continued to be active in the deafblind community. She encouraged deafblind people to never give up and "keep trying". In 1991, Miss Lawhorn wrote her autobiography entitled On Different Roads. She supported that people had the same goals but took different roads.

=== Late years ===
In the 2000s, Geraldine traveled throughout the United States to educate people on how to teach deafblind people. She lived alone in her South Side apartment and daily used a lot of equipment like the Braille cooking utensils. She wished she could drive and be more active in the deafblind cause. Nevertheless, she stayed grateful for the opportunity she had in life and said: "I enjoy what I get and I don't worry about the rest".

Sanjay Leela Bhansali cited Geraldine's autobiography One Different Roads as one source of inspiration for his film Black, released in 2005. The same year, Geraldine received the Ninth Annual Mercedes Mentor Award in Chicago.

In 2011, Jerrie Lawhorn retired from the Hadley Institute for the Blind and Visually Impaired after 40 years of teaching. The same year, the Winnetka-Northfield Chamber of Commerce awarded Geraldine as the Winnetka Teacher of the Year. She was honored during the Winnetka-Northfield chamber's 35th Annual Recognition Lunch on May 4, 2011, at the Winnetka Community House. Miss Lawhorn received other recognition in her lifetime. For instance, she was introduced into the Disabled Persons Hall of Fame in Chicago and received the Hadley School's Challenge of Living Award. Furthermore, Geraldine was treasurer for the Club of Blind-Deaf Adults in Chicago for many years and served at the Illinois Advisory Board for Services for Persons Who are Deaf-Blind directed by James Thompson, former Illinois governor.

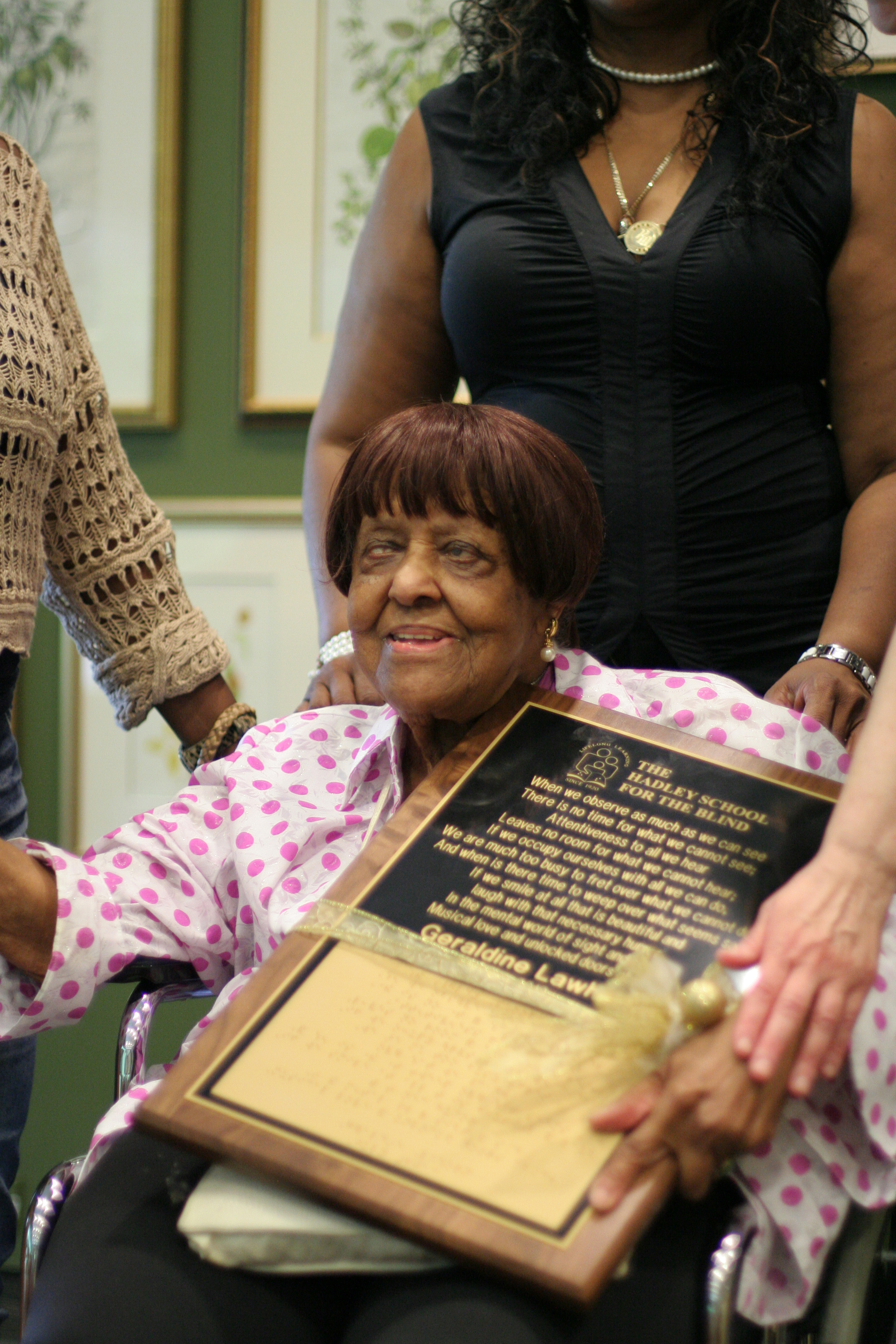
Geraldine Lawhorn receiving a price from the Hadley Institute for the Blind and Visually Impaired. In the top right-hand corner, her longtime interpreter Charita Graham

Geraldine Lawhorn died on July 3, 2016, at Weiss Memorial Hospital on the North Side of Chicago. Her friends, relatives, and students described her as an open, joyful and optimistic woman. Miss Lawhorn left all her estate to the Hadley Institute for the Blind and Visually Impaired.

== List of books written ==
- Lawhorn, Geraldine (1991). On Different Roads: An Autobiography (1st ed.). New York: Vantage Press. ISBN 0533088240.
- Lawhorn, Geraldine. Petals of View. American Printing House for the Blind.
- Lawhorn, Geraldine (1954). While It Is Day. American Printing House for the Blind.
