= Carlson School of Management =

University of Minnesota business school

Coordinates: 44°58′14″N 93°14′42″W

The University of Minnesota – Carlson School of Management
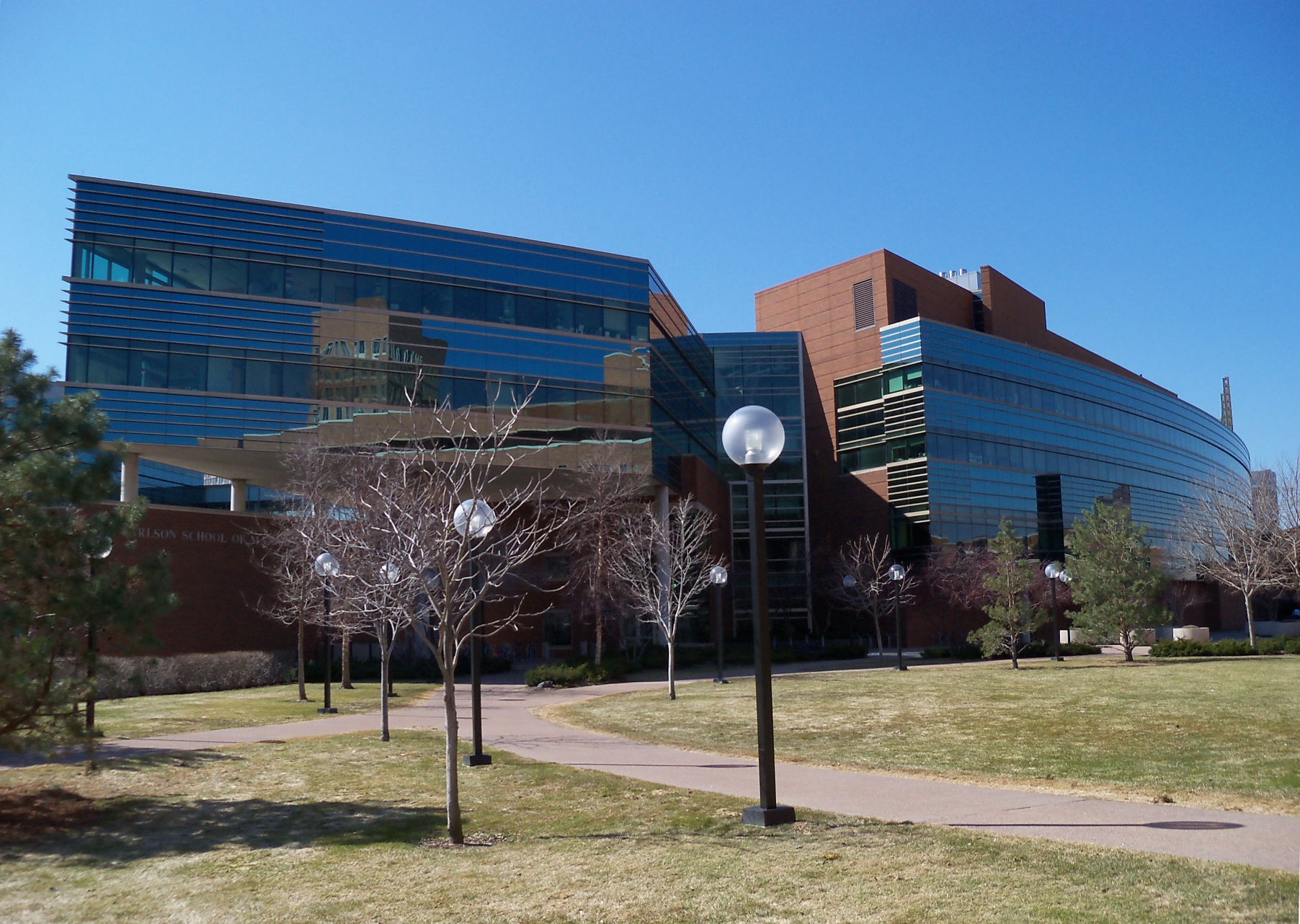
- The Carlson School of Management
- Type: Public business school
- Established: 1919
- Parent institution: University of Minnesota
- Dean: Jamie Prenkert
- Faculty: 104 (tenure/tenure track); 38 (full-time instructional)
- Undergraduates: 3,028
- Postgraduates: 1,634
- Doctoral students: 98
- Location: Minneapolis, Minnesota, United States
- Campus: Urban
- Website: www.carlsonschool.umn.edu

The Curtis L. Carlson School of Management (Minnesota Carlson)is the business school of the University of Minnesota, a public research university in the Twin Cities of Minneapolis and Saint Paul, Minnesota. Minnesota Carlson offers undergraduate and graduate degrees as well as an executive education program. It also offers dual degrees with the colleges and schools of public affairs, law, medicine, and public health.

== History ==
The school was established in 1919, originally as the University of Minnesota Business School. George Dowrie, a banking expert from Michigan, was named the business school's first dean. In 1920, the University of Minnesota became the 18th school to be accredited by the Association to Advance Collegiate Schools of Business (AACSB).

In 1961, the Field Projects was launches to provide students with learning experiences outside of the classroom. The program continued for nearly four decades, eventually to be replaced in the modern era by the Carlson Enterprise programs — the David S. Kidwell Funds Enterprise, the Carlson Consulting Enterprise, Carlson Brand Enterprise, and Carlson Ventures Enterprise.

In 1968, Professors Gordon Davis, Gary Dickson, and Tom Hoffmann launched the Management Information Systems (MIS) academic program and the Management Information Systems Research Center (MISRC). They became the first formal academic program and the first formal research center devoted to this new field, respectively.

In 1986, the school’s name changed to the Curtis L. Carlson School of Management, following a $25 million gift from Curtis L. Carlson, the founder and chairman of the board of the Carlson Companies. Carlson later committed $10 million toward a new facility for the school, which opened in 1998. Today, the school is known formally as the Carlson School of Management and goes by Minnesota Carlson or Carlson for short.

== Campus ==
The Carlson School of Management's two facilities, the Marilyn C. Nelson Hall and Herbert M. Hanson Jr. Hall, are on the University of Minnesota's West Bank, west of the Mississippi River.

=== Marilyn C. Nelson Hall ===
Minnesota Carlson is housed in a 243,000-square-foot (22,600 m^{2}), five-story building that was dedicated in 1998. The building has 33 classrooms, 35 meeting rooms, a 180-seat lecture hall, and a 250-seat auditorium. It is equipped with wireless internet access, experiential learning laboratories, and teleconferencing and video interview capabilities. It is also home to a dining center in the basement level. The facility is currently undergoing renovations.

=== Herbert M. Hanson Jr. Hall ===
Opened on September 25, 2008, Hanson Hall is connected to Minnesota Carlson by the Robert Sparboe skyway. As part of a $40 million expansion project, Herbert M. Hanson Jr. Hall nearly doubled the size of the business school, and provided a state-of-the-art home for Minnesota Carlson's undergraduate program. Hanson Hall covers 124,000 square feet (11,500 m^{2}), is four stories tall, and has nine classrooms with wireless Internet access and state-of-the-art presentation technology. It also features 22 interview rooms, 10 breakout rooms, a collaborative learning lab, a recruiter lounge, a meeting room for information sessions and presentations by the corporate community, offices for undergraduate advising, undergraduate career placement, offices for the Department of Economics in the College of Liberal Arts, and a Caribou Coffee. The building is named after the benefactors, Herb and Bar Hanson, who kicked off the building campaign with a $10 million pledge in 2004. In 2006, the Minnesota State Legislature granted $26.6 million in funding to Minnesota Carlson as part of the University of Minnesota's Capital Campaign request.

== Academics ==
Business school rankings

United States
- Bloomberg MBA: 23
- USNWR MBA: 27

Global
- QS MBA: 57
- Financial Times MBA: 81

The school offers a bachelor's, MBA, and doctoral degrees, as well as executive education programs hosted domestically and abroad. Dual-degree programs include a JD/MBA, MD/MBA, MHA/MBA, and a MPP/MBA. Other programs include a Master of Human Resources and Industrial Relations (MHRIR), a Master of Business Taxation (MBT), a Master of Accountancy (MAcc), a Master of Science in Business Analytics (MSBA), an online Master of Applied Business Analytics (MABA), a Master of Marketing (MMKTG), a Master of Science in Finance (MSF), and a Master of Science in Supply Chain Management (MS SCM).

In 1920, the University of Minnesota became the 18th school to be accredited by the Association to Advance Collegiate Schools of Business (AACSB).

== Centers and Institutes ==
Minnesota Carlson is home to a variety of centers and institutes that connect faculty within the school and across the University of Minnesota:

- Analytics for Good Institute
- Business Advancement for Health (BACH)
- Carlson Global Institute
- Center for Human Resources and Labor Studies (CHRLS)
- Center for Integrative Leadership
- Gary S. Holmes Center for Entrepreneurship
- Institute for Research in Marketing
- Juran Research Center
- Management Information Systems Research Center

== Notable alumni ==
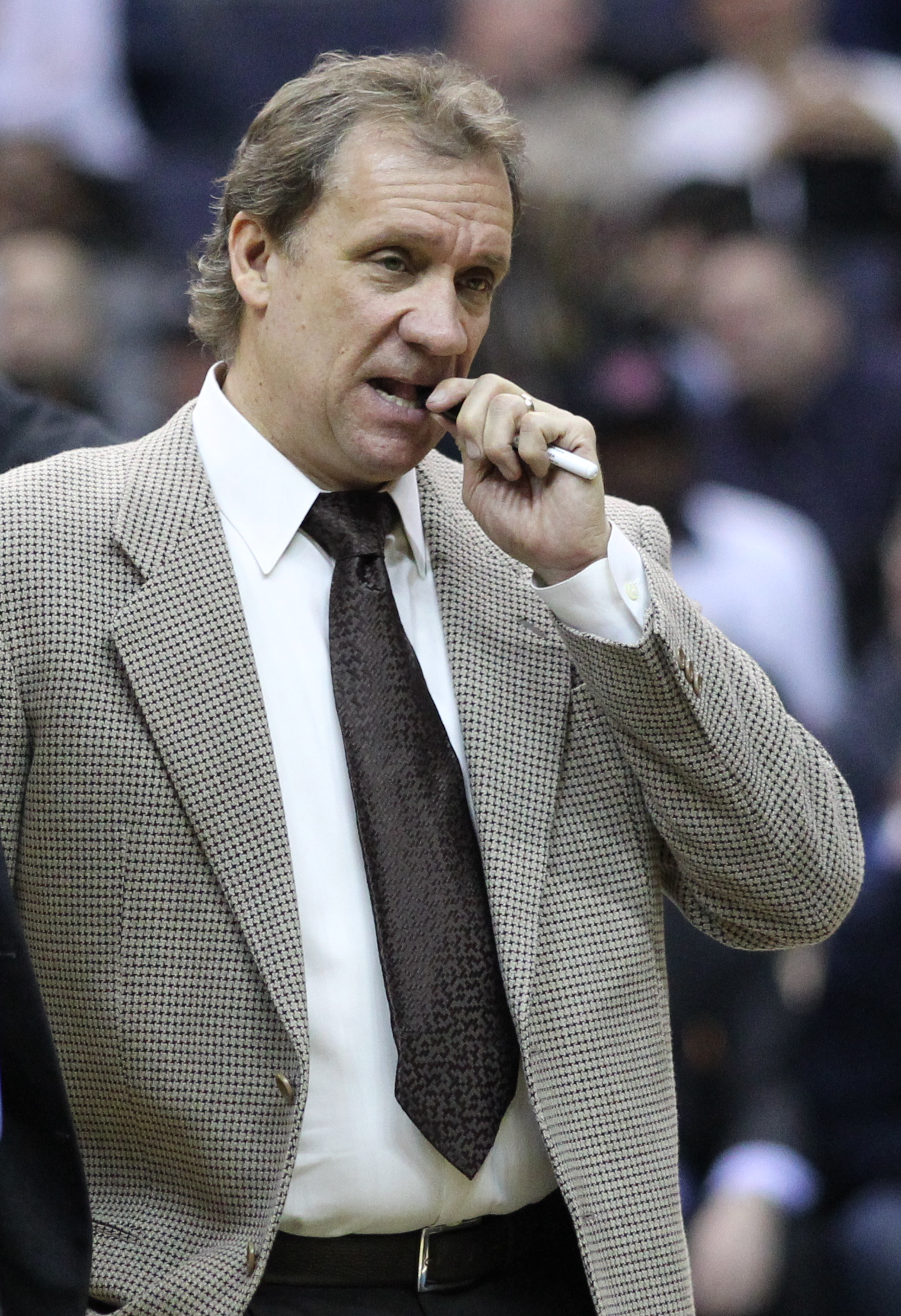
Flip Saunders

- Curtis L. Carlson ('37 BA) – Chairman, Carlson Companies, Inc., namesake of the Curtis L. Carlson School of Management
- Evan Kaufmann (born 1984), hockey player
- John G. Stumpf (MBA) – Former CEO, Wells Fargo
- Thomas O. Staggs (BSB) – Former COO, The Walt Disney Company
- C. Elmer Anderson ('31 BBA, '83 PhD) – Minnesota governor, Minnesota state senator; chair & CEO, HB Fuller Co.
- Richard Cyert ('43 BSB) – President, Carnegie Mellon University
- Robert K. Jaedicke ('57 PhD) – Dean and professor emeritus, Stanford Graduate School of Business
- Marcus Alexis ('59 PhD) – Dean, University of Illinois at Chicago, College of Business Administration
- Tony Dungy ('78 BSB) – Former head coach, Indianapolis Colts, National Football League
- John Hammergren ('81 BSB) – Chairman and CEO, McKesson Corporation
- Flip Saunders ('83 BSB) – Co-owner, president of basketball operations and general manager, Minnesota Timberwolves, National Basketball Association; former head coach, Minnesota Timberwolves, National Basketball Association
- Wan Ling Martello ('83 MBA) – Executive vice president, chief executive officer Zone Asia, Oceania and sub-Saharan Africa, Nestlé; former executive vice president, global eCommerce, emerging markets, Walmart
- William Spell ('79 BSB, '82 MBA) – Founder and President of Spell Capital Partners, LLC
- Asha Sharma (BSB) – Executive Vice President and CEO, XBOX

== See also ==
- List of United States business school rankings
- List of business schools in the United States
