= Richard Kinney =

Deafblind American school administrator

- Born: June 21, 1923; East Sparta
- Died: February 19, 1979 (aged 55); Evanston Hospital
- Alma mater: University of Mount Union
- Occupation: University teacher
- Employer: Hadley

Richard Kinney (June 21, 1923 – February 19, 1979) was an American educator and school administrator. Blind at age six and deaf by age twenty, Kinney was the third deafblind person in the United States to earn a college degree. Kinney published four volumes of poetry and was president of the Hadley School for the Blind from 1975 until his death in 1979.

== Early life and education ==
Richard Kinney was born on June 21, 1923, in East Sparta, Ohio. His parents were a teacher and a hardware store merchant. He was born with normal senses, but lost his sight after a bacterial infection when he was six years old. He spent the next four years at home, where his education came from his parents reading and from the radio. In 1934 he entered the Waring School in Cleveland, where he learned braille. He passed second, third, and fifth grade in his first winter at the school. Kinney returned to mainstream schooling the following year at age twelve. His parents read lessons to him in the evenings and he completed assignments with a portable typewriter.

Kinney entered Mount Union College in 1942, where he joined Sigma Alpha Epsilon and was appointed the school newspaper's poetry editor. His hearing began to fail at the end of high school and by his sophomore year in college he was completely deaf. He left college in 1944 and returned to living with his parents. In the 1950s, he wrote to Robert Smithdas, a deafblind man who had graduated from college in 1950; Smithdas encouraged Kinney to return to college to earn his degree. Kinney received training from the deafblind department at the Industrial Home for the Blind of the City of Brooklyn (IHB), learning the manual alphabet and other forms of communication, before returning to school. Kinney took correspondence courses through the Hadley School for the Blind, and with the help of the Ohio Rehabilitation Service and a scholarship from the American Foundation for the Blind, returned to classes at Mount Union College in 1951. He graduated summa cum laude in 1954. Kinney was the third deafblind person to graduate from college in the United States, after Helen Keller and Smithdas. In East Sparta, hundreds gathered in an auditorium to recognize his achievement on what was denoted as "Richard Kinney Day."

== Career ==
Kinney joined the Hadley faculty as an instructor of English in 1954. He was named assistant director of the school in 1958, adding fundraising and public relations to his instructional work. He wrote four volumes of poetry and a textbook on rehabilitation of the deafblind. He became president of Hadley in February 1975, after the retirement of Donald Wing Hathaway.

He was the chair of the World Council for the Welfare of the Blind Committee on Services to the Deaf-Blind.

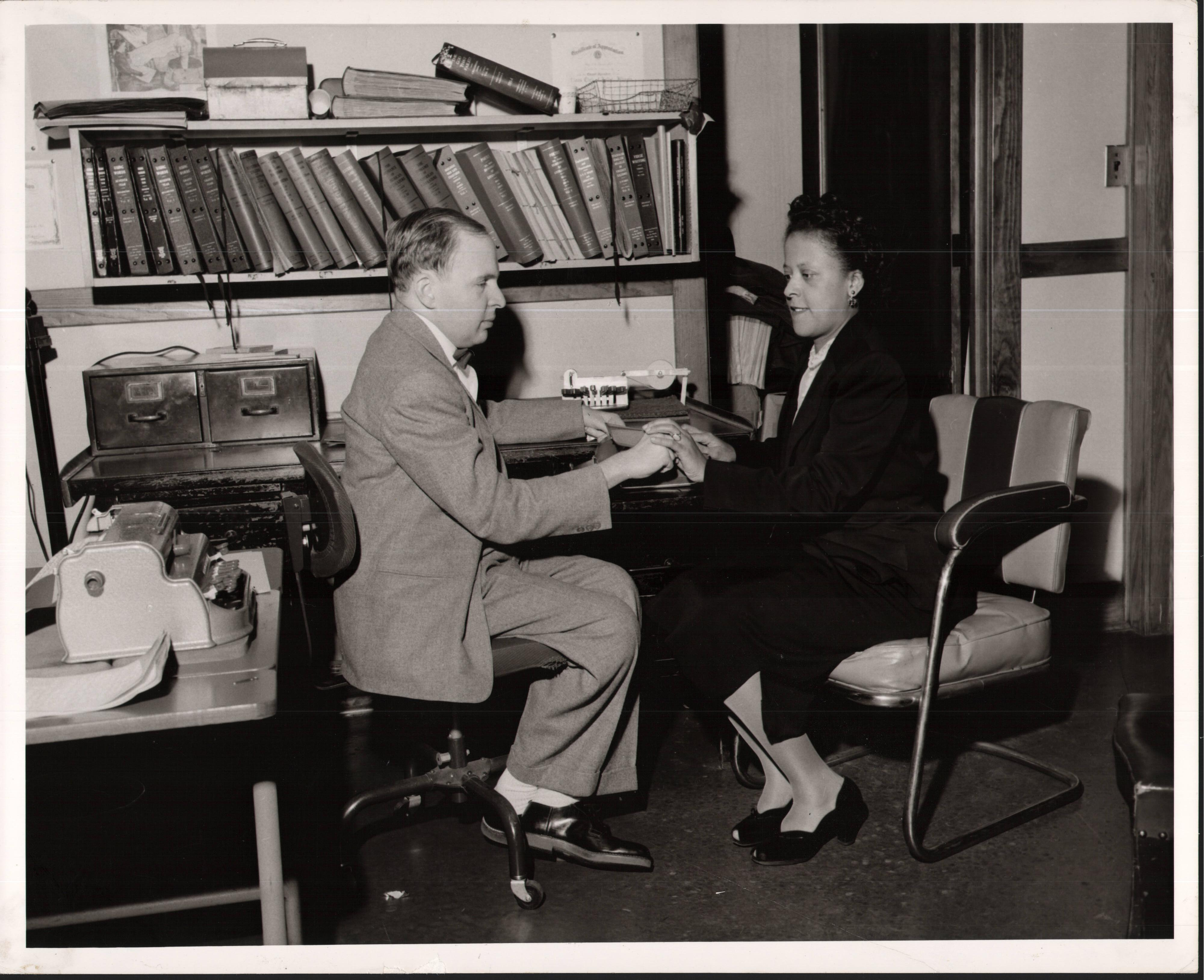
Richard Kinney signing with Geraldine Lawhorn, another deafblind instructor at Hadley.

Kinney died of a heart attack in Evanston, Illinois, on February 19, 1979.

== Personal life ==
Kinney married Evelyn Davis Warmbrodt, a blind high school French teacher, in 1962. She died in 1966; they had one son together, Clark, born in 1963.

== Honors and legacy ==
Kinney received many honors throughout his lifetime. He was given two honorary doctorates, one from Mount Union College in 1966 and another from Loyola University in 1977. Lions Clubs International recognized him with the Ambassador of Goodwill Award and he received a Citation for Meritorious Service from President Eisenhower. The American Library Association honored his contribution to the advancement of library service for people who are blind or physically disabled with the Francis Joseph Campbell Award in 1978. That same year, he won the Man of the Year award from the National Home Study Council. He was also the recipient of the Anne Sullivan Gold Medal Award, offered for outstanding service to the deafblind, and the Helen Keller Gold Medal for Literary Excellence.

The Richard Kinney Challenge of Living Award is given to a Hadley student with multiple disabilities "who displays outstanding courage and educational initiative."

A biography of Kinney was published by Lyle Crist in 1974 titled Through the Rain and Rainbow: the Remarkable Life of Richard Kinney.
