= C. John Wilder =

American businessman

C. John Wilder is an American business executive who is the former CEO of TXU Energy. In 2007, he negotiated the sale of TXU, then a public company which was in the Fortune 500, to private investors. The $45 billion leveraged buyout structured by Wilder was the largest ever at the time. Wilder was named as one of the world's top CEOs by the Harvard Business Review in 2010.

== Early life and education ==
Wilder earned a bachelor's degree in business administration from Southeast Missouri State University in 1980, graduating magna cum laude. He earned a master's degree in business administration from the University of Texas.

== Career ==
In his early career, Wilder worked nearly twenty years at Royal Dutch Shell. He became the CEO of Shell Capital.

In February 2004, Wilder joined TXU as CEO. As CEO, Wilder sold off assets, including an overseas utility, a telecom start-up, and a natural-gas distribution company. He announced plans in 2006 to build 11 coal-fired plants in Texas, which drew opposition from environmentalist and public officials.

In 2007, Wilder negotiated TXU's sale in a leveraged buyout by Kohlberg Kravis Roberts (KKR), TGP, and Goldman Sachs Group.The $45 billion deal was the largest leveraged buyout to date. That same year, he also founded Bluescape Resources, in order to invest in energy-related ventures and assets.

In September 2015, Wilder was hired by Wilbur Ross as chairman of Exco Resources, an oil and gas producer. He resigned from Exco in November 2017.

== Personal life ==
Wilder is married to Susan Wilder. They have three children.
