= Mitchell Downtown Historic District =

Historic district in Indiana, United States

- U.S. National Register of Historic Places
- U.S. Historic district
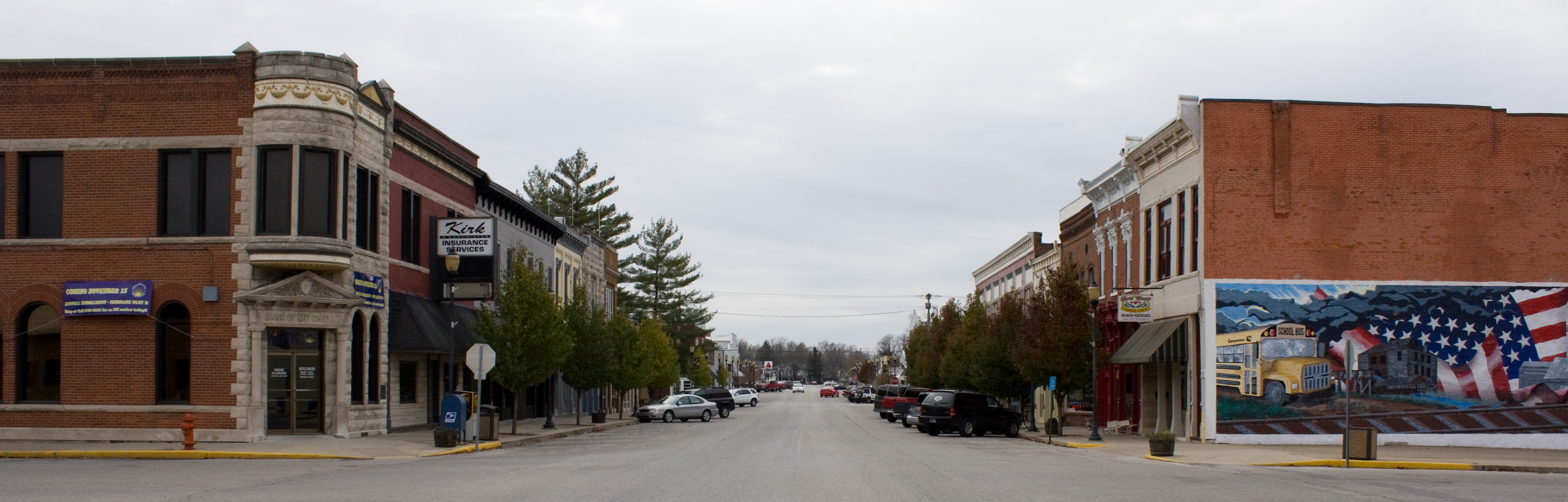
- Mitchell Downtown Historic District, November 2008

- Location within Indiana Location within the United States
- Location: Roughly bounded by Tenth, oak, Fifth, and N. Mississippi Sts., Mitchell, Indiana
- Coordinates: 38°44′00″N 86°28′28″W
- Area: 19.6 acres (7.9 ha)
- Architect: McGuire & Shook
- Architectural style: Italianate, Queen Anne, Romanesque
- NRHP reference No.: 97001175
- Added to NRHP: September 26, 1997

Mitchell Downtown Historic District is a national historic district located at Mitchell, Indiana.

The district encompasses 75 contributing buildings in the central business district and surrounding residential sections of Mitchell. It developed between about 1853 and 1946, and includes examples of Italianate, Romanesque Revival, and Queen Anne style architecture. Located in the district is the separately listed Mitchell Opera House. Other notable buildings include the First National Bank Building (1927), Odd Fellows Hall (c. 1925), Jacob Finger Methodist Church (1874, 1925), Dr. William Dings House (c. 1885), Edward Moore House (1894), Bank of Mitchell Building (1897), Fannie Moore Richardson House (1910), Mitchell Public (Carnegie) Library (1917) and Theatorium.

It also includes a marker for the birthplace of astronaut Virgil Grissom on Eighth Street.

It was listed in the National Register of Historic Places in 1997.
