= William Hadley =

William Hadley may refer to:

- William A. Hadley (1860–1941), founder of Hadley school for the blind, Illinois, USA
- William F. L. Hadley (1847–1901), American congressman
- William M. Hadley (1917–1992), American educator
- Bill Hadley (rugby union) (1910–1992), New Zealand rugby union player
- William Sheldon Hadley (1859–1927), British academic
