= Lawhorn =

Lawhorn is a surname. Notable people with the surname include:

- Geraldine Lawhorn (1916–2016), American deaf-blind advocate, performer, actress and pianist
- JJ Lawhorn (born 1993), American country music singer-songwriter
- Joseph Lawhorn, United States Army military chaplain
- Sammy Lawhorn (1935–1990), American Chicago blues guitarist
