= Mitchell High School (Indiana) =

School in Mitchell, Indiana, United States

Location
- 1000 Bishop Boulevard; Mitchell, Lawrence County, Indiana 47446; United States; 38.736640°N 86.480379°W

Information
- Type: Public high school
- School district: Mitchell Community Schools
- Principal: Chad Carlson
- Teaching staff: 35.33 (FTE)
- Grades: 9-12
- Enrollment: 213 (2023–2024)
- Student to teacher ratio: 6.03
- Color
- Athletics: IHSAA 2A
- Athletics conference: Patoka Lake Conference
- Team name: Bluejackets
- Newspaper: The Orbit
- Website: www.mitchell.k12.in.us/o/mhs

Mitchell High School is a small public high school located in Mitchell, Indiana.

== History ==
The graded public school system was first utilized in Mitchell in 1869. Ten years later, the Emerson School was built on 8th Street. Emerson was used as Mitchell's high school until 1903.

In 1903, Mitchell received a new high school named Riley. This was used as the high school until a new high school was built next to the Emerson building in 1916.

The 1916 building received additions in 1922, 1940, and 1949. The old Emerson was torn down in 1927 and a new Emerson Elementary and gym were built in its place.

In May 1960, a fire destroyed the 1916 building and the 1922 addition. A new building was completed in time for the 1962 to 1963 school year. This building is still used today as the community's high school. Mitchell High School is accredited by the North Central Association of Colleges and Schools. It serves more than 500 students in grades nine through twelve.

== Curriculum ==
Students may earn the Indiana Honors Diploma, and college credits through Indiana Reform Institute in chemistry, language arts, calculus, and psychology.

== Extracurricular activities ==
Student groups and activities include Art Club, Key Club, Chemistry club, Fellowship of Christian Athletes, French Club, Spanish Club, Book Club, student council, and Students Against Destructive Decisions. SADD is the school's largest extracurricular activity. The Mitchell High School band, called Sound of the Swarm, play at every home football and basketball game.

=== Athletics ===
Mitchell's athletic teams compete in the Patoka Lake Conference and the Indiana High School Athletic Association (IHSAA). In the 2015-17 athletic seasons the Jackets competed in 2A competition in all sports, Cross country, wrestling and track and field do not have a class set-up in the state of Indiana.

Mitchell's athletic teams have won more than 30 conference titles, 36 Sectional championships, five Regional crowns, and State Finals appearances in boys' basketball (1940), girls' volleyball (2001), boys' cross country (2005), and most recently girls' basketball (2007).

== Notable alumni ==
- Terry Cole - former NFL running back
- Gus Grissom - former NASA astronaut and Second American to fly in Space
- Chase Briscoe - NASCAR Cup Series driver
- Ashley Yoder - UFC fighter

== See also ==
- List of high schools in Indiana
