= Mitchell, Indiana =

- City
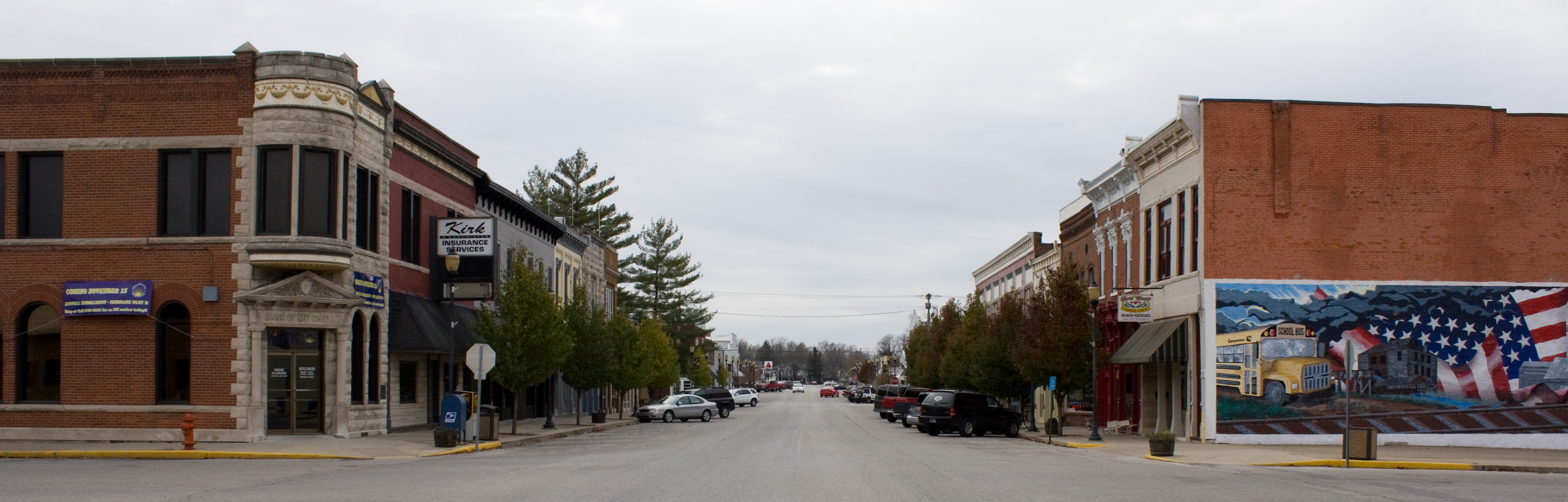
- Main St., Downtown Mitchell, Indiana.

- Location of Mitchell in Lawrence County, Indiana.
- Coordinates: 38°44′32″N 86°28′32″W
- Country: United States
- State: Indiana
- County: Lawrence
- Incorporated (town): 1864
- Incorporated (city): 1907

Government
  - Mayor: Don Caudell II (R)

Area
  - Total: 3.60 sq mi (9.32 km^{2})
  - Land: 3.59 sq mi (9.31 km^{2})
  - Water: 0.0039 sq mi (0.01 km^{2}) 0.30%
- Elevation: 682 ft (208 m)

Population (2020)
  - Total: 3,933
  - Density: 1,094.5/sq mi (422.57/km^{2})
- Time zone: UTC-5 (EST)
  - Summer (DST): UTC-4 (EDT)
- ZIP code: 47446
- Area code: 812
- FIPS code: 18-49950
- GNIS feature ID: 2395357
- Website: mitchell-in.gov

Mitchell is a city in Marion Township, Lawrence County, Indiana, United States. As of the 2020 census, Mitchell had a population of 3,933.

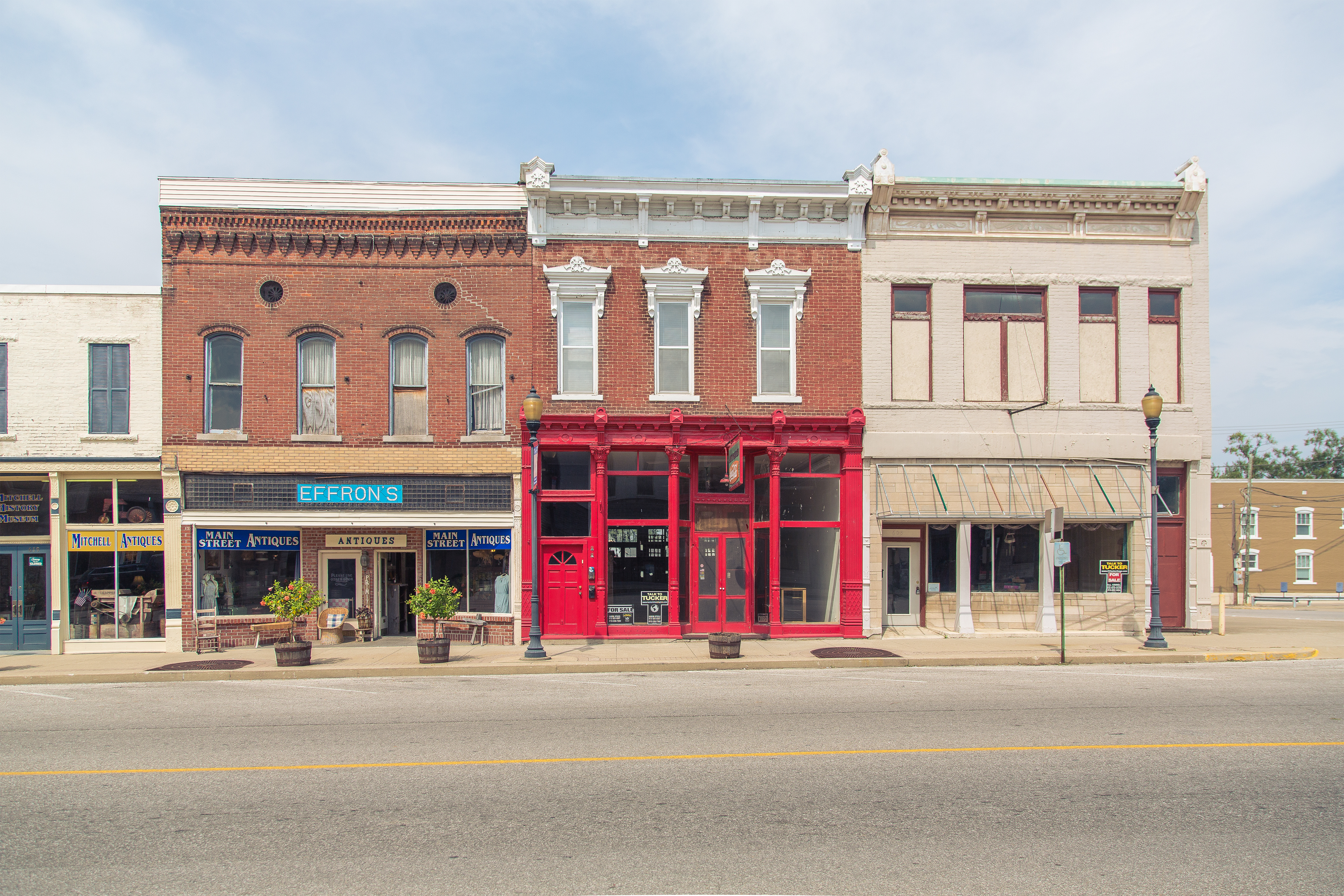
Photo from Small Town Indiana photo survey.

== History ==
Mitchell was built as a railroad town in the mid-19th century. At this location in Lawrence County, the Chicago, Indianapolis and Louisville Railroad, better known by the shorter name of "the Monon", was built as a north–south line from New Albany to Chicago, passing through the area which became Mitchell in 1853. In 1857, the east–west Ohio and Mississippi Railway (later part of the Baltimore and Ohio Railroad) was completed, as part of a link between Cincinnati and St. Louis.

At the intersection of the two rail lines, a new town was planned. As the O&M railroad was surveyed, the owners of the land arranged for one of the surveyors, Ormsby McKnight Mitchel (1810–1862), a West Point graduate and professor at the University of Cincinnati, to plat their new town in exchange for naming it for him. (The second "L" in Mitchell was added later.) A native of Kentucky, Ormsby Mitchel grew up in Lebanon, Ohio, and was also an attorney and notable astronomer. He later became a major general in the Union Army during the American Civil War (1861–1865), and is best known for ordering the raid that became famous as the Great Locomotive Chase. He was known as "Old Stars". General Mitchel died of yellow fever while serving in Beaufort, South Carolina.

The town was incorporated in 1864, becoming a city in 1907. Mitchell hosted a number of manufacturers, including (in 1919) the wagon, truck and bus body enterprises of Ralph H. Carpenter which became known as the Carpenter Body Company. School bus body production continued until 1995.

In 1851, the Mitchell area was the birthplace of outlaw and train robber Sam Bass (1851–1878). He was orphaned at age 13, but was apparently engaged in lawful activities until 1877, when he became an icon of the "wildness" of the American Old West as he robbed banks, stagecoaches and railroad trains before being fatally wounded by Texas Rangers the following year. Despite Bass' short-lived criminal career, he is remembered as part of a robbery of gold on September 18, 1877, which remains the largest robbery in Union Pacific Railroad's history.

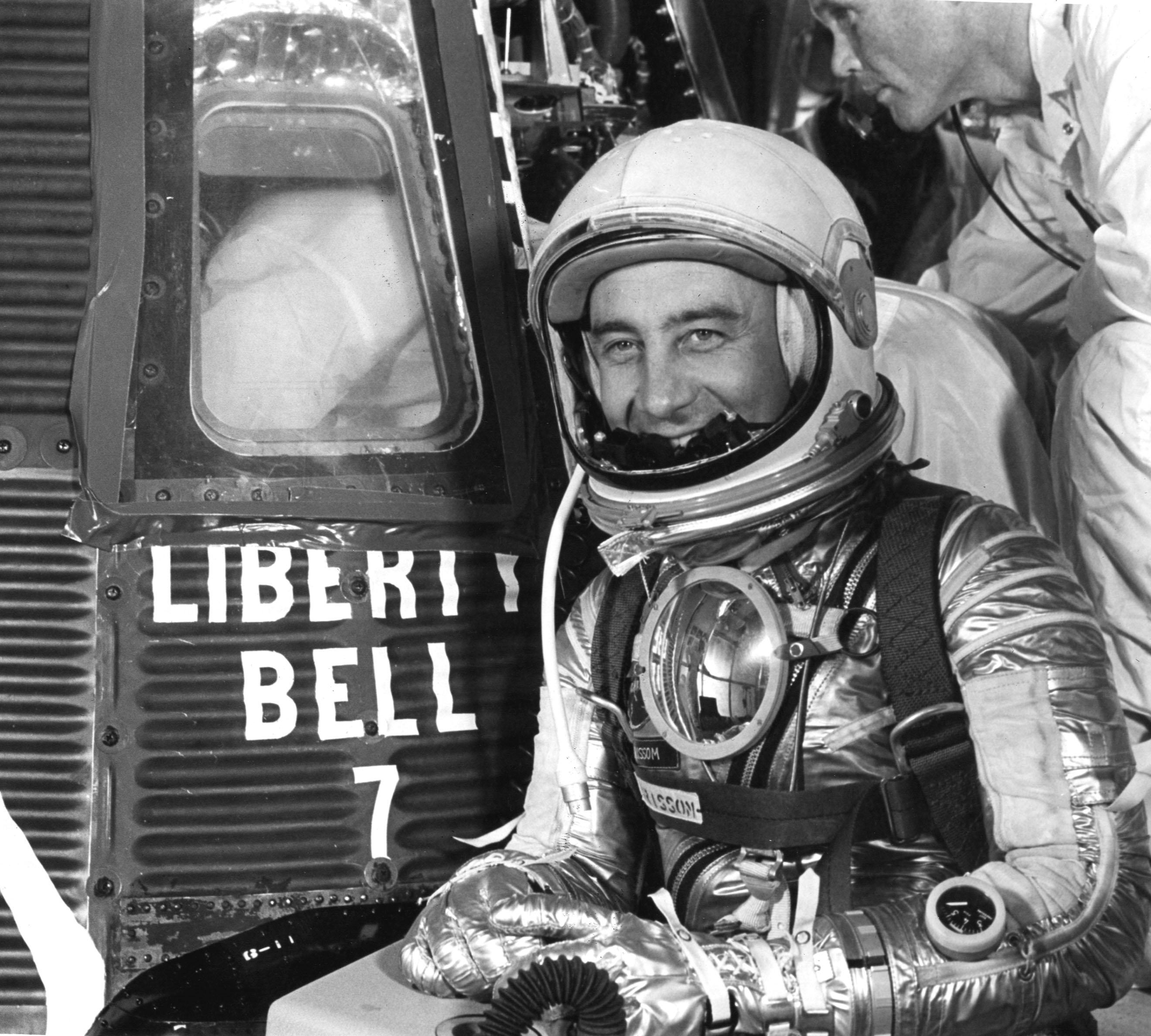
U.S. astronaut Gus Grissom, native of Mitchell, Indiana, in front of the Liberty Bell 7 capsule, in which he became the second American to fly in outer space

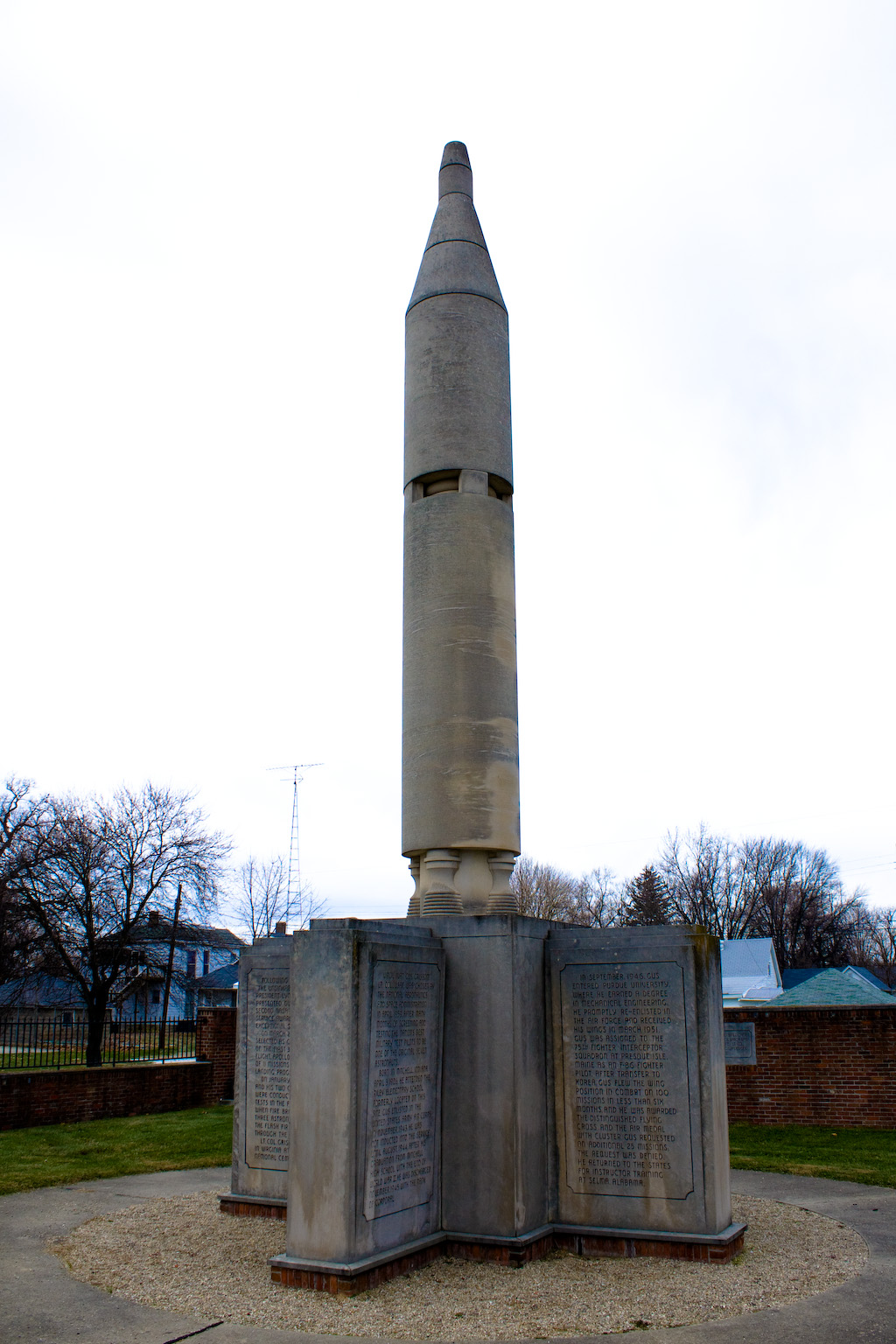
The Gus Grissom Memorial in Mitchell, Indiana

Mitchell was also the birthplace of astronaut Virgil "Gus" Grissom (1926–1967). A mechanical engineering graduate of Purdue University, he joined the United States Air Force and was selected as a member of NASA's Project Mercury space program. Gus Grissom was the second American to fly in space on Liberty Bell 7 and also flew aboard Gemini 3. He died in a launch pad fire at Kennedy Space Center in Florida during a training exercise for Apollo 1 on January 27, 1967.

Spring Mill State Park is located just east of Mitchell. It includes a memorial to Grissom as well as several caves and a pioneer village. The buildings in the village are original structures from the former mill town that was located here, recreations of buildings in the town, and other pioneer-era buildings that were moved to the park.

The Monon became part of the Louisville and Nashville Railroad. Both it, and the former B&O are now part of CSX Transportation's rail network. In modern times, Mitchell is also served by the Union Pacific system.

In the late 20th century, Mitchell's downtown area was defined as a historic district that was listed on the National Register of Historic Places. The town developed an Urban Enterprise Zone, and industrial park, and at the end of the century, was working to attract new businesses and industry while also capitalizing on its heritage through antique shops and tourism.

The Mitchell Downtown Historic District and Mitchell Opera House are listed in the National Register of Historic Places.

== Geography ==
According to the 2010 census, Mitchell has a total area of 3.285 square miles (8.51 km^{2}), of which 3.28 square miles (8.50 km^{2}) (or 99.85%) is land and 0.005 square miles (0.01 km^{2}) (or 0.15%) is water.

== Demographics ==
Historical population
| Census | Pop. | Note | %± |
|---|---|---|---|
| 1870 | 1,087 | | — |
| 1880 | 1,439 | | 32.4% |
| 1890 | 1,583 | | 10.0% |
| 1900 | 1,772 | | 11.9% |
| 1910 | 3,438 | | 94.0% |
| 1920 | 3,025 | | −12.0% |
| 1930 | 3,226 | | 6.6% |
| 1940 | 3,393 | | 5.2% |
| 1950 | 3,245 | | −4.4% |
| 1960 | 3,552 | | 9.5% |
| 1970 | 4,092 | | 15.2% |
| 1980 | 4,641 | | 13.4% |
| 1990 | 4,669 | | 0.6% |
| 2000 | 4,567 | | −2.2% |
| 2010 | 4,350 | | −4.8% |
| 2020 | 3,933 | | −9.6% |
U.S. Decennial Census

=== 2020 census ===
As of the 2020 census, Mitchell had a population of 3,933. The median age was 41.3 years. 23.0% of residents were under the age of 18 and 18.9% of residents were 65 years of age or older. For every 100 females there were 89.8 males, and for every 100 females age 18 and over there were 87.8 males age 18 and over.

0.0% of residents lived in urban areas, while 100.0% lived in rural areas.

There were 1,687 households in Mitchell, of which 28.3% had children under the age of 18 living in them. Of all households, 38.1% were married-couple households, 19.5% were households with a male householder and no spouse or partner present, and 34.7% were households with a female householder and no spouse or partner present. About 34.8% of all households were made up of individuals and 15.2% had someone living alone who was 65 years of age or older.

There were 1,895 housing units, of which 11.0% were vacant. The homeowner vacancy rate was 1.5% and the rental vacancy rate was 8.6%.

Racial composition as of the 2020 census
| Race | Number | Percent |
|---|---|---|
| White | 3,714 | 94.4% |
| Black or African American | 14 | 0.4% |
| American Indian and Alaska Native | 6 | 0.2% |
| Asian | 16 | 0.4% |
| Native Hawaiian and Other Pacific Islander | 0 | 0.0% |
| Some other race | 28 | 0.7% |
| Two or more races | 155 | 3.9% |
| Hispanic or Latino (of any race) | 105 | 2.7% |

=== 2010 census ===
As of the census of 2010, there were 4,350 people, 1,786 households, and 1,145 families living in the city. The population density was 1,326.2 inhabitants per square mile (512.0/km^{2}). There were 2,014 housing units at an average density of 614.0 per square mile (237.1/km^{2}). The racial makeup of the city was 97.6% White, 0.4% African American, 0.2% Native American, 0.3% Asian, 0.1% Pacific Islander, 0.7% from other races, and 0.8% from two or more races. Hispanic or Latino of any race were 1.4% of the population.

There were 1,786 households, of which 33.2% had children under the age of 18 living with them, 43.8% were married couples living together, 15.0% had a female householder with no husband present, 5.3% had a male householder with no wife present, and 35.9% were non-families. 31.9% of all households were made up of individuals, and 15.5% had someone living alone who was 65 years of age or older. The average household size was 2.38 and the average family size was 2.96.

The median age in the city was 39.2 years. 24.9% of residents were under the age of 18; 8.3% were between the ages of 18 and 24; 24.7% were from 25 to 44; 25% were from 45 to 64; and 17.1% were 65 years of age or older. The gender makeup of the city was 46.5% male and 53.5% female.

=== 2000 census ===
As of the census of 2000, there were 4,567 people, 1,884 households, and 1,235 families living in the city. The population density was 1,345.6 inhabitants per square mile (519.5/km^{2}). There were 2,118 housing units at an average density of 624.1 per square mile (241.0/km^{2}). The racial makeup of the city was 98.31% White, 0.28% African American, 0.11% Native American, 0.09% Asian, 0.02% Pacific Islander, 0.13% from other races, and 1.05% from two or more races. Hispanic or Latino of any race were 0.53% of the population.

There were 1,884 households, out of which 32.6% had children under the age of 18 living with them, 46.5% were married couples living together, 14.9% had a female householder with no husband present, and 34.4% were non-families. 31.2% of all households were made up of individuals, and 14.8% had someone living alone who was 65 years of age or older. The average household size was 2.36 and the average family size was 2.93.

In the city the population was spread out, with 26.0% under the age of 18, 7.9% from 18 to 24, 27.1% from 25 to 44, 22.9% from 45 to 64, and 16.2% who were 65 years of age or older. The median age was 37 years. For every 100 females, there were 85.0 males. For every 100 females age 18 and over, there were 79.4 males.

The median income for a household in the city was $28,559, and the median income for a family was $33,415. Males had a median income of $28,160 versus $18,194 for females. The per capita income for the city was $13,894. About 14.0% of families and 16.9% of the population were below the poverty line, including 20.9% of those under age 18 and 16.7% of those age 65 or over.

== Economy ==
Heidelberg Materials's $600 million cement plant, the second-largest in the U.S., was completed in 2023. In March 2024, the Biden administration's Department of Energy (DOE) awarded the company a grant of up to $500 million to develop a system for capturing and underground storing of carbon produced by its cement production. The plant's project was one of 33 in 20 states selected for a major DOE carbon reduction project. In May 2025, the Trump administration cancelled the grant as part of its efforts to end projects intended to slow global warming. The demonstration project would have brought 1,000 construction jobs and around three dozen permanent positions to the town.

== Education ==
The town has a lending library, the Mitchell Community Public Library.

== Festival ==
Persimmon pudding and ice cream are sold at the Persimmon Festival held every September.

== Notable people ==
- Sam Bass, outlaw
- Chase Briscoe, NASCAR driver
- Terry Cole, NFL running back
- Gus Grissom, Mercury Seven and Project Gemini astronaut

== See also ==
- Mitchell High School (Indiana)
- Haunted locations in Indiana
