= Robert Smithdas =

American teacher, advocate and author (1925–2014)

- Born: Robert J. Smithdas; June 7, 1925; Brentwood, Pennsylvania, U.S.
- Died: July 17, 2014 (aged 89); Fort Collins, Colorado, U.S.
- Spouse: Michelle

Robert J. Smithdas (June 7, 1925 – July 17, 2014) was an American deaf-blind teacher, advocate and author.

== Biography ==
Smithdas was born in Brentwood, Pennsylvania. For many years, he was the director of Services for the Deaf-Blind at the Industrial Home for the Blind in New York City. He began his career there in 1950 after graduating with a Bachelor of Arts Degree, cum laude, from St. John's University in New York. Three years later, he became the first deaf-blind person to earn a master's degree. He achieved this distinction at New York University where he specialized in vocational guidance and rehabilitation of disabled people. In conjunction with his work at Helen Keller National Center, he was an advocate for deaf-blind education and employment. He retired in December 2008. His wife Michelle was also deaf-blind. Barbara Walters considered Smithdas her "most memorable interview".

== Books ==
- Life at My Fingertips, (1958) Doubleday
- City of the Heart (poetry), (1966) Taplinger
- Shared Beauty (poetry), (1982) Portal Press
