= William Spell =

American investor and entrepreneur

William H. Spell
- Born: Minneapolis, MN, United States
- Education: University of Minnesota (BS and MBA)
- Occupations: Investor and entrepreneur
- Employer(s): Spell Capital Partners, Spell Family Office
- Known for: Founder and president of Spell Capital Partners
- Spouse: Tiki Spell (m. 1984)
- Children: 2

William (Bill) Spell is an American investor and entrepreneur. He is the founder and president of Spell Capital Partners and the Spell Family Office. Spell Capital is based in Minnesota and has a 37-year history of investing in private equity, specializing in industrial manufacturing transactions. Since 2018, the firm has invested on behalf of the Spell Family Office which has assets under management (AUM) of $700 Million.

Spell started his career as an investment banker, working for a Midwest-based regional investment bank. During 1988 when he left to found Spell Capital Partners, he was Director of the corporate finance group. The majority of Spell's career has been spent in private equity buyouts, mergers and acquisitions.

Together with his wife, Tiki, they are the founders of Spell Estate winery in Sonoma, California. Spell has also been involved with numerous charitable and philanthropic activities, including the Spell Family Foundation.

== Early life and education ==
Bill was born in Minneapolis, Minnesota and grew up in Golden Valley, Minnesota. His father was a United States Naval officer during World War II and the Korean War. He retired as CFO of a Fortune 500 utility/energy company.

Bill attended Golden Valley High School (GVHS) and graduated in 1975. During his time at GVHS, he was an accomplished wrestler. He obtained a Bachelor of Science degree (BS) from the University of Minnesota in 1979. While at the University of Minnesota, he was a member of the Sigma Alpha Epsilon fraternity. Bill earned a Master of Business Administration (MBA) from the Carlson School of Management at the University of Minnesota in 1982. From 2006 to 2007, he served as an adjunct instructor at the Carlson School, teaching a course on leadership in business management.

== Career ==
Bill began his career in early 1981 as an investment banker at a large Midwest investment bank where he worked for seven years. During that time, he became a principal and when he left was head of the corporate finance department. During his tenure as an investment banker, the firm specialized in venture capital, private placements and initial and secondary public offerings.

In early 1988, Bill founded Spell Capital Partners, a private equity firm that specializes in lower middle market industrial leveraged buyouts (LBO). The firm currently manages $700 Million of capital (AUM) and has 8 active platform investments.

Spell Capital Partners considers investment opportunities globally and owns businesses in North America, Asia, Australia/New Zealand, and South America. The firm has an expertise and preference for investing in the plastics industry, capital equipment companies, packaging businesses, and niche manufacturing companies.

The firm had a credit/mezzanine division from 2011 to 2022 and in July of 2022, sold the mezzanine group to 10 employees, who now manage the Spell legacy mezzanine funds I and II.

During 2018, Spell Capital Partners transitioned from investing third party investor capital to investing as a family office, having converted to the Spell Family Office.

From 1993 to 2006, the principals of Spell Capital Partners held a controlling interest in a publicly traded company, PW Eagle (Nasdaq: PWEI), which was the second largest plastic pipe manufacturer in the United States. During that time, Bill Spell held positions as Board Chairman, CEO, and President. In 2006, the company had approximately $720 Million in sales revenue with over $100 Million of EBITDA cash flow. During that year, Bill exited the investment.

Since inception, Spell Capital Partners has posted an annual IRR investment performance of 26.9% and a cash-on-cash multiple of 3.28 times.

Spell Capital Partners was named in the “Top 50 PE Firms in the Middle Market” in each of the years from 2018 through 2024. In 2019, Inc. Magazine included Spell Capital Partners in its Top 50 Private Equity firms. During 2020, the US Small Business Administration (SBA) named Spell Mezzanine the “SBIC firm of the year.”

Since 1997, Bill has been a member of the Young Presidents' Organization (YPO), and Chief Executives Organization (CEO).

== Spell Estate Winery ==
During 2006, Tiki and Bill Spell founded the Spell Estate Winery, and in 2009 released their first vintage. The winery is located just outside Santa Rosa, California in the Russian River Valley Appellation of Sonoma County. They currently produce two single vineyard Pinot Noirs, a proprietary Pinot blend, a Chardonnay, and a Rosé. Production peaked during 2017 at 1,900 cases. The wine is distributed in various regions of the United States.

== Philanthropy ==
In 1997, Bill and his wife Tiki established the Spell Family Foundation. The foundation supports mainly religious, medical, and children's philanthropies. Bill has also served on the board of directors for a number of philanthropic organizations including the Minneapolis Heart Institute at Abbott Northwestern Hospital, the Minnesota Zoo, the Center for the American Experiment, and the 1% Giving Club.

== Personal life ==
The Spells have properties in Edina, Minnesota, Scottsdale, Arizona, and Sun Valley, Idaho. Bill and his wife, Tiki, have been married for 40 years, and have two married adult children and three grandchildren.

Bill is a third generation Greek American. The Spell family (Speliopoulos) emigrated to the United States from the Peloponnese region of Greece at the turn of the twentieth century. He is actively involved in various leadership positions in the Greek Orthodox Church. He is a member of the Archdiocesan Council of the Greek Orthodox Archdiocese of America and has been a member of the Executive Committee. Bill is a fulfilled member of Leadership 100, a board member of The Order of St. Andrew, an Archon of the Ecumenical Patriarchate, and a past Parish Council President of his Church in Minneapolis, Minnesota. Bill is on the Patriarch Bartholomew Foundation investment board, and on the board of the Metropolis of Chicago Foundation. In 2015, he was a recipient of the Medal of St. Paul, the highest honor in the Greek Orthodox Church for a non-clergy member. Bill is a board member of The Hellenic Initiative, Holy Cross Seminary/Hellenic College, and the St. Nicholas Church and Shrine in New York.
