= William A. Hadley =

American educator (1860–1941)

- Born: William Allen Hadley; February 24, 1860; Mooresville, Indiana, U.S.
- Died: October 2, 1941 (aged 81); Winnetka, Illinois, U.S.
- Education: Earlham College, University of Minnesota
- Occupation(s): Educator, academic administrator
- Known for: Advocate for the blind and blind education
- Children: 2

William Allen Hadley (1860–1941), was an American educator, academic administrator, and advocate for the blind. He was the founder of the Hadley School for the Blind in Winnetka, Illinois.

== Biography ==
William Allen Hadley is born on February 24, 1860, in Mooresville, Indiana. He had a brother and two sisters. He lost his vision in one eye (date unknown). He graduated from Earlham College with a Bachelor of Arts degree in 1881; before he earned his master's degree from the University of Minnesota.

He married Jessie Henderson, a schoolteacher from Fox Lake, Illinois; together they had two children.

Hadley taught at Marietta College in Ohio, and in public schools in Peoria, Illinois (before 1900). Between 1900 until 1915, he taught at Chicago's Lake View High School. The Hadleys moved to Winnetka, Illinois in 1905. During the holiday break in 1915, Hadley caught influenza. Two days after his illness, he lost vision in both of his eyes at the age of 55 (from a detached retina). He learned braille the same year as losing his eyesight.

He died on October 2, 1941, in Winnetka, and is buried in Mooresville, Indiana.

== Hadley School for the Blind (1920–present) ==
The school was founded in 1920 by William A. Hadley, a Chicago high school teacher who lost his sight at age 55. To address the absence of educational opportunities for blind people, he began teaching braille by mail and established a school offering accessible, tuition-free classes for blind and visually impaired people. Hadley has been quoted as saying if he had to choose between having his sight back and the Hadley School, he would choose the school.

When you think of the other fellow only and not yourself, your own problem fades into insignificance; in unselfishness lies the real thrill of being alive.

— William A. Hadley

== Timeline ==
- 1920 - Hadley and Dr. E.V.L. Brown, an ophthalmologist and friend, found the Hadley Correspondence School for the Blind.
- November 1920 - A woman in Kansas becomes the first Hadley student to enroll to learn "braille by mail."
- By 1938 - More than 1,000 home-study (distance education) courses have been sent to blind students throughout the U.S.
