= Mitchell Opera House =

- U.S. National Register of Historic Places
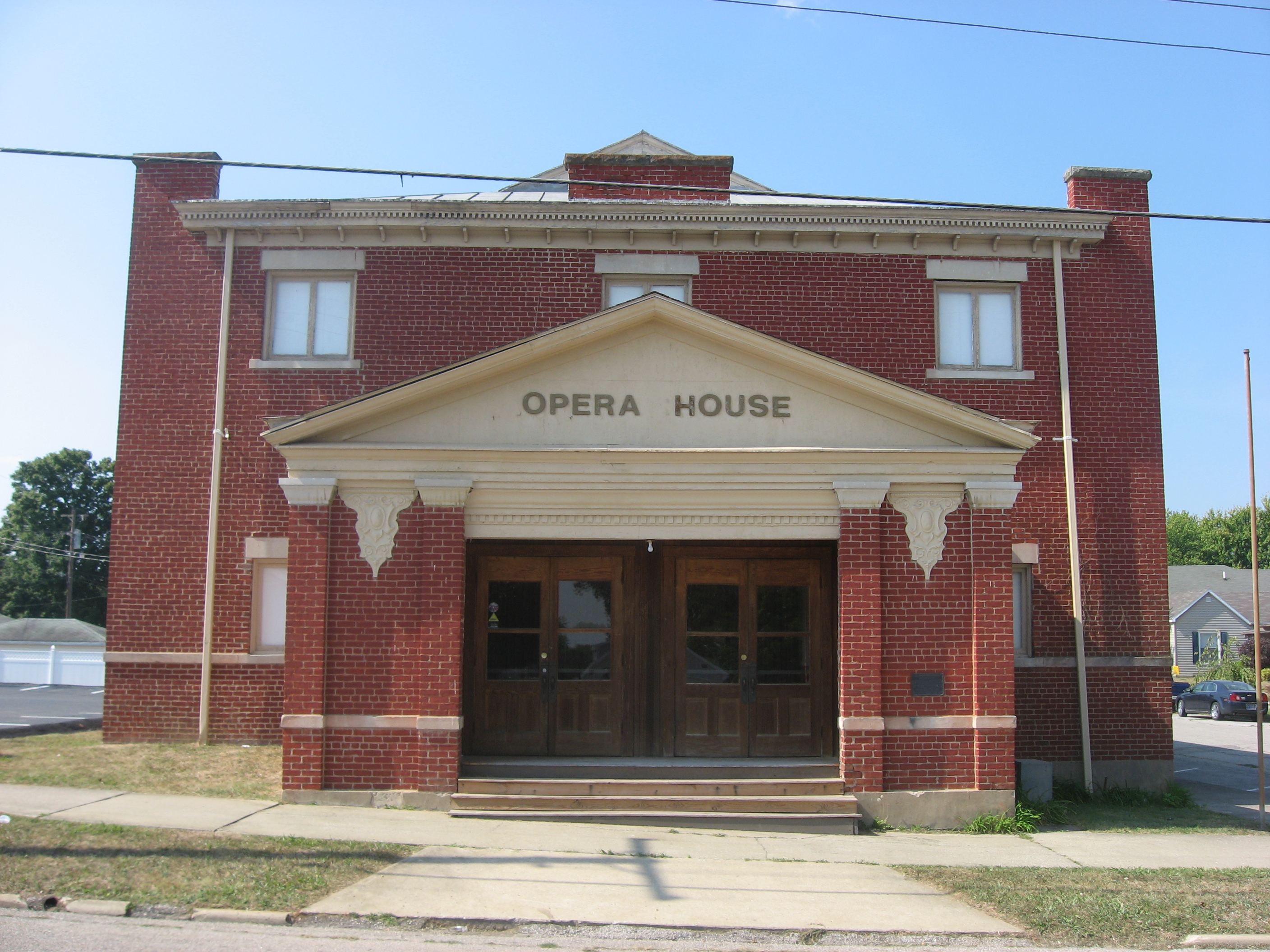
- Mitchell Opera House, September 2010

- Location within Indiana Location within the United States
- Location: 7th and Brooks Sts., Mitchell, Indiana
- Coordinates: 38°44′4″N 86°28′27″W
- Area: less than one acre
- Built: 1905-1906
- Architect: Vanhoy & Sons
- NRHP reference No.: 81000020
- Added to NRHP: April 2, 1981

Mitchell Opera House, also known as Mitchell City Hall, is a historic theater building located at Mitchell, Indiana. It was built in 1905–1906, and is a two-story, brick building measuring 45 feet wide and 85 feet deep. It has a one-story projecting entry, gable roof, and gambrel roof over the stage area at the rear of the building. It housed a theater until 1927, then served as city hall between 1952 and 1979.

It was listed in the National Register of Historic Places in 1981.
