= Wan Ling Martello =

Filipino American businesswoman

- 龚万仁
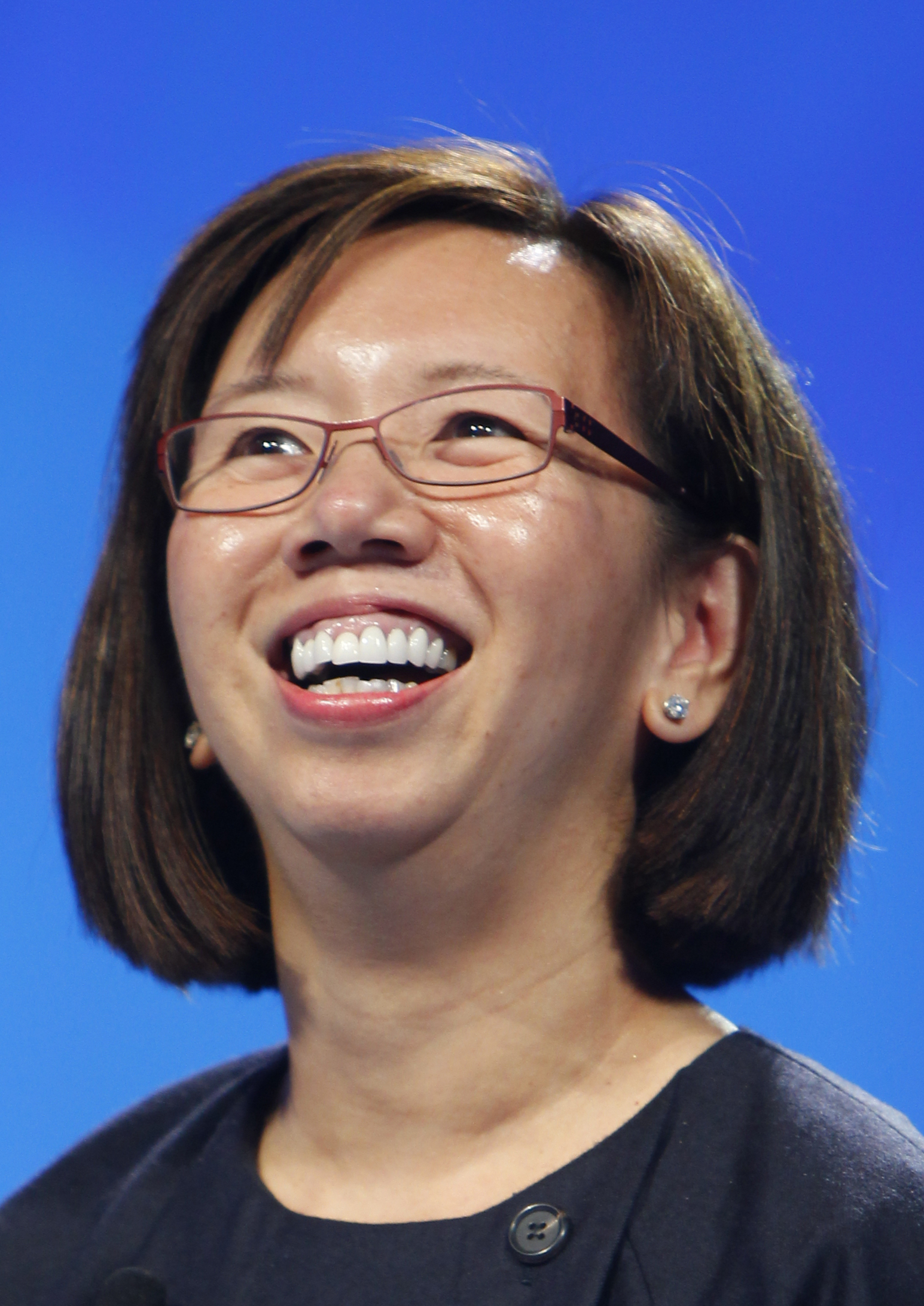
- Born: 1958 (age 67–68); Manila, Philippines
- Education: BSc Business Administration and Accountancy at University of the Philippines Diliman; MBA University of Minnesota

Wan Ling Martello (1958, Manila) is a Filipino American businesswoman. Martello was an executive vice president of Nestlé from 2011 to 2018.

== Education ==
Martello is an American citizen of Chinese heritage, born and raised in the Philippines.

She has a Bachelor of Science in business administration and accounting from University of the Philippines-Diliman. She received her MBA from University of Minnesota.

She is fluent in English, Mandarin, Hokkien Chinese and Tagalog.

== Career ==
From 2005 to 2011, she held executive positions at Walmart. She had the following roles: Executive Vice President of Global eCommerce, Emerging Markets at Walmart, EVP, COO, Global eCommerce; and Senior Vice President, CFO & Strategy for Walmart International.

From 2011 to 2018, she worked for Nestlé, the world's largest food company, as executive vice president (since 2011), chief financial officer (since 2012) and Head of the Asia Zone, she succeeded Jim Singh, executive vice president and chief financial officer, who retired in March 2012, and preceded François-Xavier Roger.

In 2018 she was ranked 9th in Forbes' list of most powerful women in business outside of the US.

Martello is also a member of the board of directors of Alibaba, Uber and Stellantis.
