= Hadley (non-profit organization) =

American non-profit organization

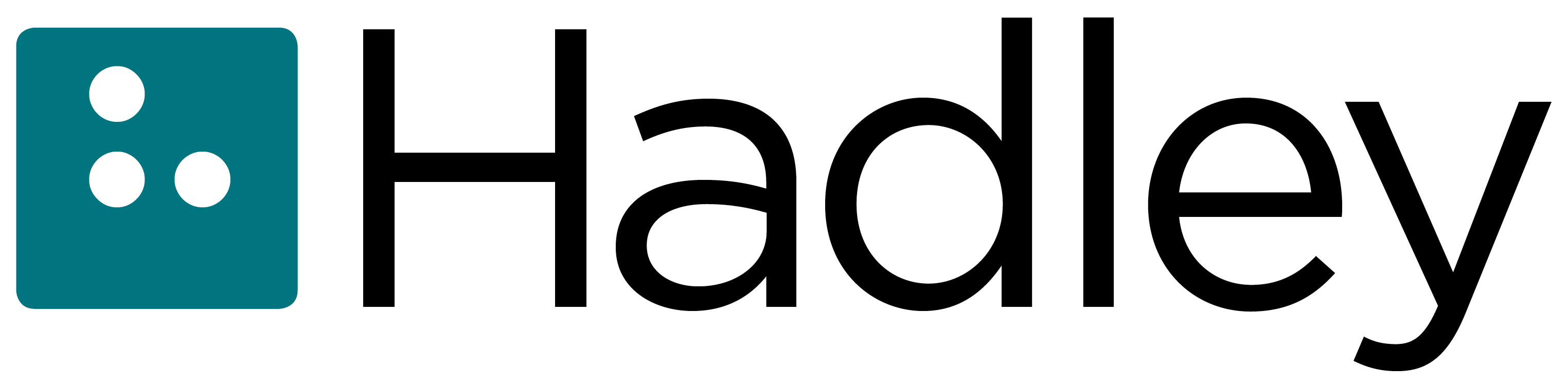

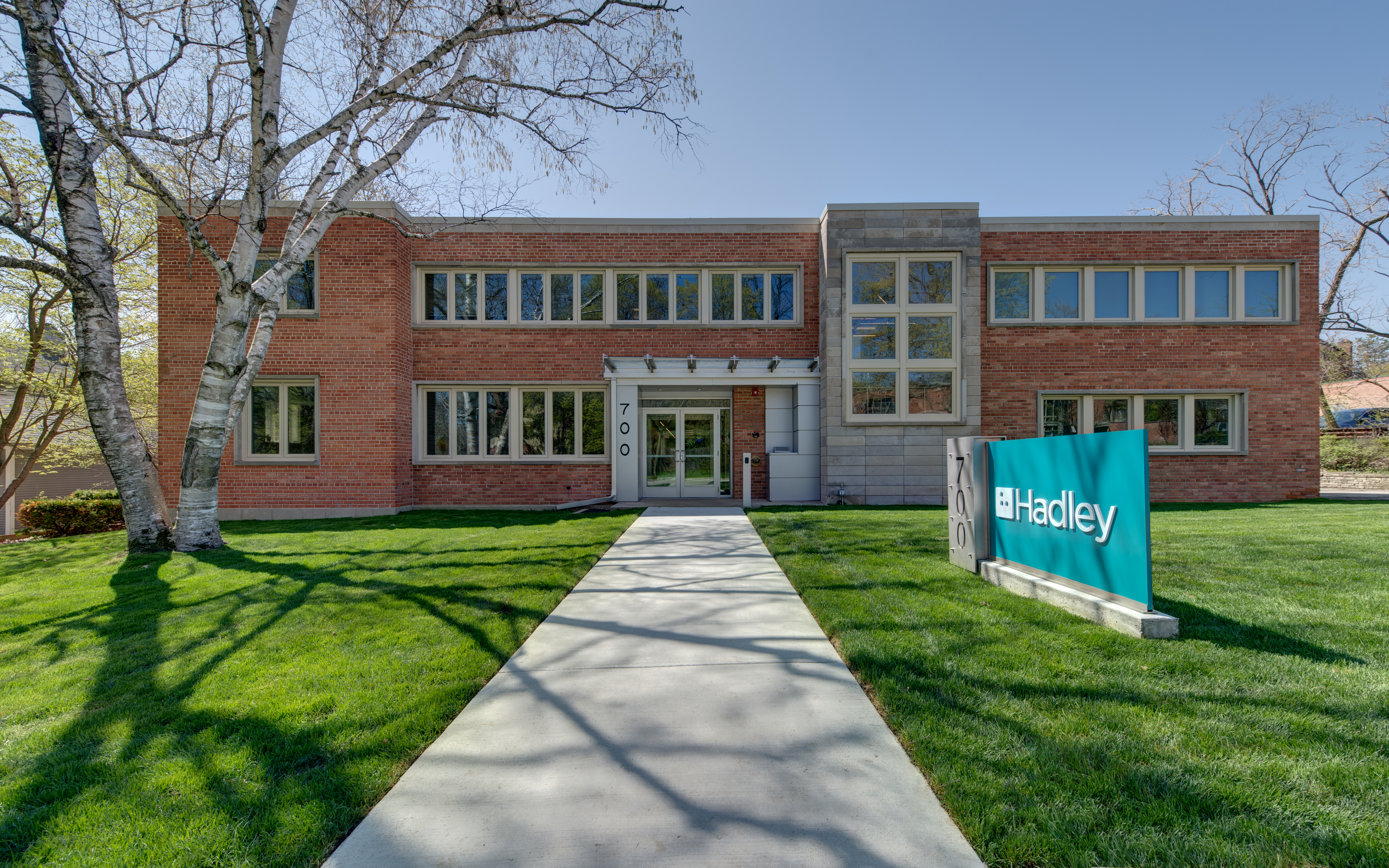
- Hadley Headquarters in Winnetka, IL
- Formation: 1920
- Founder: William A. Hadley
- Founded at: Winnetka
- Type: Nonprofit
- Tax ID no.: 36-2183809
- Legal status: 501(c)(3) organization
- Headquarters: 700 Elm Street
- Location: Winnetka, Illinois, USA
- Coordinates: 42.1056°N 87.7305°W
- President: Johnjoe Farragher
- Main organ: Board of Trustees
- Website: www.hadleyhelps.org
- Formerly called: Hadley Institute for the Blind and Visually Impaired, Hadley School for the Blind

Hadley is an American nonprofit organization based in Winnetka, Illinois, that helps adults navigate the emotional and practical realities of vision loss. Founded in 1920 as a braille correspondence school, Hadley now provides free on-demand programs, peer support, and direct specialist help to people with vision loss and their families and caregivers, delivered online, via an app, by phone, and by mail across the United States and internationally.

A 501(c)(3) organization, Hadley holds a Platinum Transparency rating from Candid and a four-star rating from Charity Navigator. It is funded by donations from individuals, corporations, and private foundations.

== History ==
=== Background ===
Hadley was founded in 1920 by William A. Hadley. When he lost his sight at the age of 55, William Hadley faced many challenges. A former high school teacher with a lifelong passion for reading, Hadley wanted to learn braille. He was frustrated, however in his search for a teacher, so he taught himself braille instead.

=== Founding ===
Hadley's dream was to share his newfound skills with others like him, empowering them to thrive as he had. Together with Dr. E.V.L. Brown, an ophthalmologist and neighbor, Hadley found a way to reach others through the mail. The Hadley Correspondence School and the "braille by mail" curriculum were launched in 1920. The very first student, a woman in Kansas, had lost her sight later in life, too, and she wanted to continue reading. She mailed her lessons to Hadley, and he corrected and returned them along with notes of help and encouragement.

Dr. Brown was also critical to the founding and success of Hadley. He worked to build and manage an organization that could sustain itself while offering education free of charge. In 1922, Dr. Brown was appointed to be Hadley's first President of the board of trustees and would serve in this role until his death in 1953.

=== Program and Services ===
Hadley provides free programs that help with both the practical skills and the emotional adjustments involved in living with vision loss.

Hadley offers more than 600 on-demand workshops, available as integrated audio-described videos, on a variety of topics pertinent to vision loss, from coping with challenging emotions and orientation and mobility to assistive technology and braille. The support specialists at Hadley’s Donahoe Center for Support provide help by phone and email for coping with vision loss, including processing difficult feelings and technology assistance. Hadley also provides forums for people impacted by vision loss to connect through a peer-to-peer program, virtual support groups, and interest-based discussion groups. Hadley creates two bi-monthly audio podcasts: Hadley Presents, which features discussions with experts on topics unique to vision loss, and Insights & Sound Bites, on which people share their insights on what has helped them cope with vision loss.

In addition to being available on the Hadley website and app, many resources are also accessible by phone. Hadley also provides content in the form of digital talking-book cassettes, in braille, and in large print,

Hadley’s help is available on its website at hadleyhelps.org and by phone at 800-323-4238.

=== Who Hadley Serves ===
Hadley helps adults experiencing vision loss or who are blind, as well as their families and caregivers. Many of the individuals Hadley serves are losing their sight due to age-related eye diseases such as macular degeneration, glaucoma, and diabetic retinopathy, which cause irreversible vision loss. Hadley refers to the individual it serves as members, of which there are currently more than 190,000 across the country and around the world. Hadley’s North Star goal is to help a million people by 2030.

=== Emerging Technology ===
Beginning in July 2020, Hadley transitioned its service model from a distance-learning education platform to a provider of programs that address the practical and emotional dimensions of vision loss, delivered through on-demand content, peer support, and direct specialist support.

In 2025, Hadley established the Donahoe Center for Support as the hub of its emotional support resources, including help from support specialists and peer-to-peer connections. The Donahoe Center was made possible by a $1 million gift from John Donahoe, Martha Gallo, and Susan Gally, the children of longtime Hadley trustee Tom Donahoe.

=== Partnerships ===
Hadley partners with medical professionals, insurance companies, community based social service agencies and other organizations to deliver its support to their patients and clients. These include UnitedHealthcare Vision and Notal Vision, among many others.

Hadley began a partnership with The Chicago Lighthouse in 2025 to expand the practical and emotional help available to adults adjusting to vision loss with a new series of video workshops, Adjusting and Coping Together and Adjusting to Vision Loss: Assistive Technology.

== Hadley Today ==
In July 2020, Hadley revamped its online learning platform. The updated learning hub offers free workshops on a variety of practical topics. Workshops are delivered online or through the mail in audio or print. In addition, Hadley's call-in discussion groups offer live support from experts and a chance to connect and learn from peers.

== Notable Faculty and Leadership ==
- Richard Kinney
- Geraldine Lawhorn
- Dr. E.V.L. Brown
