= Braille magazine =

Paper magazine embossed in braille format

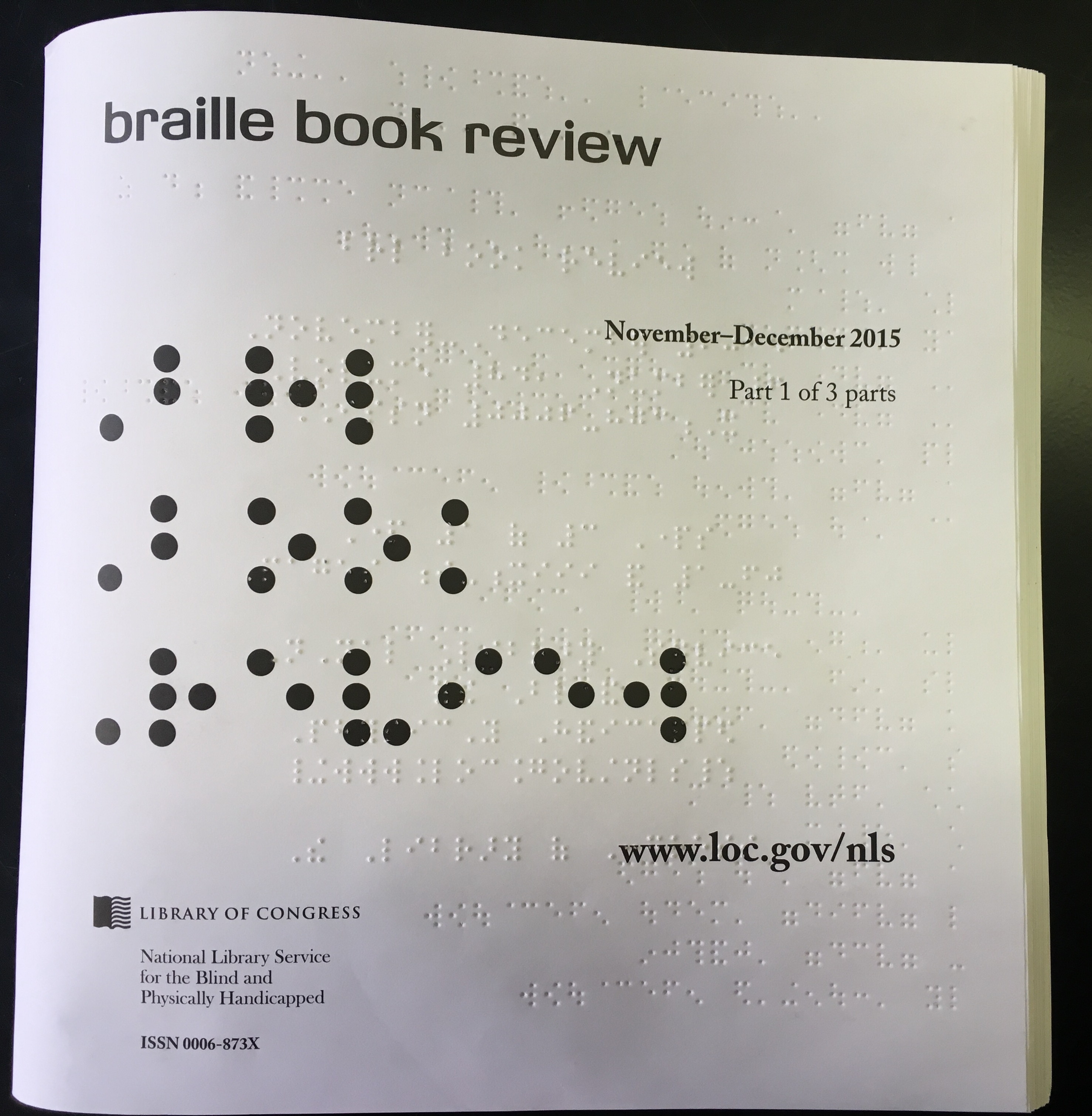
Braille magazine cover

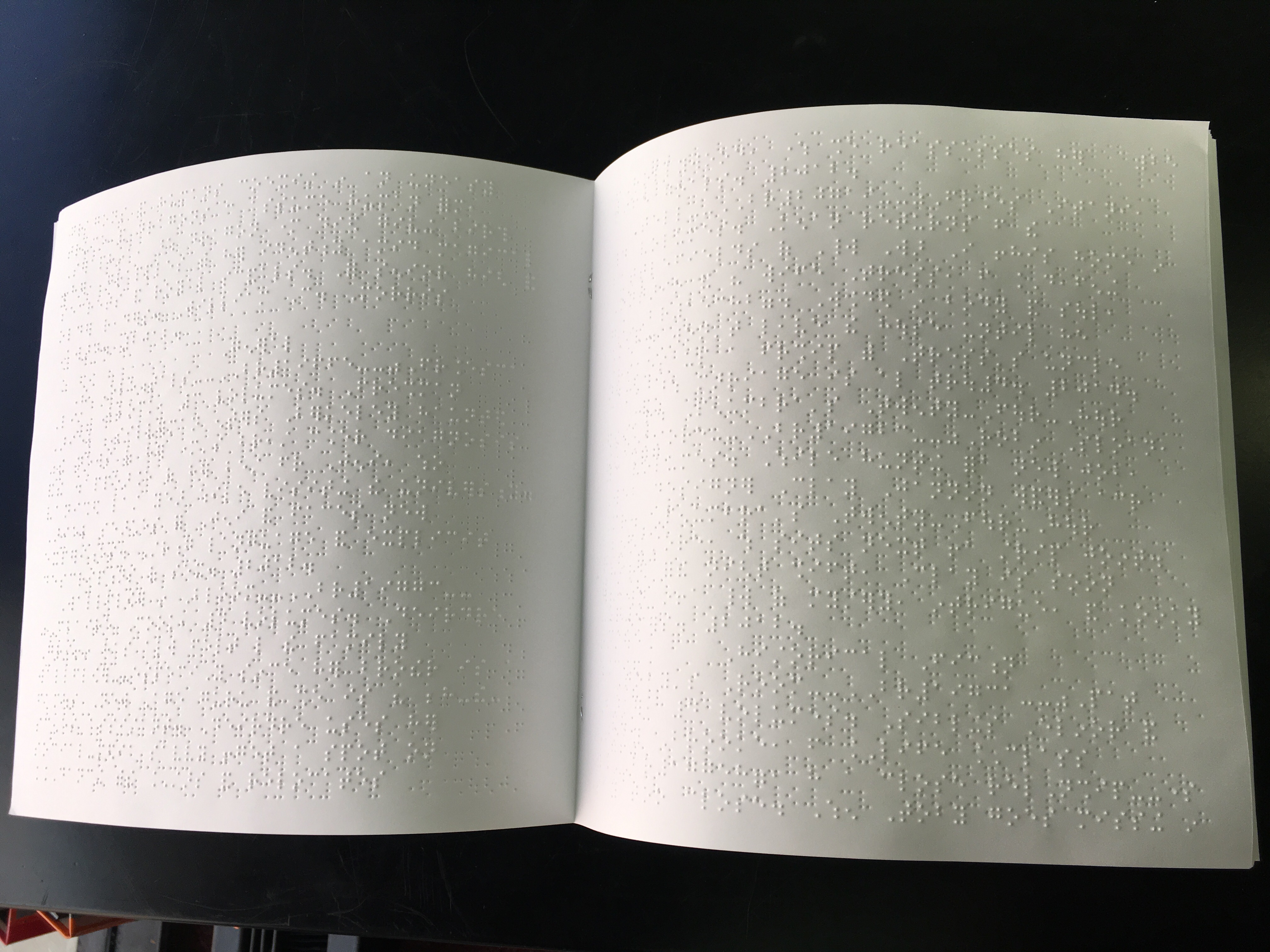
Braille magazine example pages

A Braille magazine is a paper magazine embossed in the braille format.

Many regular periodicals issue braille editions, printed in a format sometimes called "Press Braille".

== Publications ==
In the United States, a free national service circulates braille magazines and other publications.
