= Terry Cole (American football) =

American football player (1945–2005)

No. 34, 30, 31
- Position: Running back

Personal information
- Born: July 7, 1945; Mitchell, Indiana, U.S.
- Died: November 11, 2005 (aged 60); Indianapolis, Indiana, U.S.
- Listed height: 6 ft 2 in (1.88 m)
- Listed weight: 220 lb (100 kg)

Career information
- High school: Mitchell
- College: Indiana
- NFL draft: 1968: 9th round, 242nd overall pick

Career history
- Baltimore Colts (1968–1969); Pittsburgh Steelers (1970); Miami Dolphins (1971–1972); Houston Texans/Shreveport Steamer (1974)

Awards and highlights
- NFL champion (1968)

Career NFL statistics
- Rushing yards: 641
- Rushing average: 3.4
- Receptions: 25
- Receiving yards: 171
- Total touchdowns: 6
- Stats at Pro Football Reference

Terry Cole (July 7, 1945 – November 11, 2005) was an American professional football running back who played in the National Football League (NFL).

== Early life and college ==
He started his career at Mitchell High School, where he was named to the All-State team in both his junior and senior years, earning All-American honors his senior year. Cole went on to play at Indiana University, where he started at fullback his sophomore, junior, and senior years. In 1967, he was named MVP of the annual Old Oaken Bucket game against Purdue University, rushing for 155 yards and one touchdown.

== Professional career ==
Cole played six seasons for the Baltimore Colts, the Pittsburgh Steelers, and the Miami Dolphins, as well as in the World Football League with the Houston Texans/Shreveport Steamer. Highlights of his pro football career include three Super Bowl appearances and was the runner-up for the 1968 rookie of the year award.

After his NFL career, Cole started several small businesses and was president of Cole-Chem, a diversified specialty chemical company. Cole was inducted into the Indiana Football Hall of Fame in 1992 and received the Zora Clevenger award in 2005, the highest honor given to a former IU athlete. In September 2000 the Mitchell High School (Indiana) football field was officially renamed Terry Cole Field.

Cole died on November 11, 2005, of cancer.
