= Spell Capital Partners =

American private equity firm

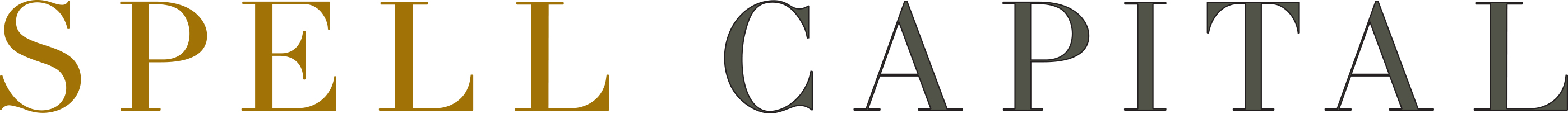
- Company type: Private Equity Firm
- Industry: Financial Services and Asset Management
- Founded: 1988
- Founder: William Spell
- Headquarters: Minneapolis, Minnesota
- Total assets: $700 million AUM
- Website: spellcapital.com

Spell Capital Partners LLC is a private equity firm based in Edina, Minnesota. The firm was founded in 1988 by William "Bill" Spell to manage private equity and mezzanine capital. The firm currently manages $700 million in capital. The firm has closed 41 leveraged buyout (LBO) transactions since 1988.

The firm historically has managed both private equity and mezzanine capital. The private equity group focuses on acquiring majority control interests in industrial manufacturing companies, while Spell Capital Mezzanine provides subordinated debt and non-control equity ownership to businesses in a variety of industries. In the summer of 2022, the mezzanine group was sold to the partners and employees who managed that group as part of Mr. Spell's succession planning strategy.

The firm manages seven portfolio companies owned by the Spell Family Office and three on behalf of Spell Capital Partners Fund V (a 2016 vintage fund).

== Investments ==
Spell Capital Partners LLC is a private investment firm that buys and manages industrial manufacturing companies on behalf of the Spell Family Office. The firm focuses on established manufacturing businesses, particularly in plastics, capital equipment, packaging, and other specialized manufacturing areas. Spell Capital Partners invests in companies in North America, Asia, Australia, New Zealand, and South America.

It typically invests between $5 million and $25 million in profitable companies with annual earnings of at least $5 million. In 2006, the firm reported an estimated $720 million in sales and more than $100 million in earnings.

In 2022, the firm’s lending and secondary-investment business was renamed NorthCoast Mezzanine.

== History ==
Bill Spell, a former investment banker, founded the company in 1988, drawing upon his prior experience as vice president and director of corporate finance at a Midwest-based investment bank. Since 1988, Spell Capital has raised five equity funds and two mezzanine funds. From 1993 to 2006, the principals of Spell Capital held a controlling interest in a publicly traded company, PW Eagle, which was the second largest plastic pipe manufacturer in the United States. During that year, Spell exited the investment.

== Recognition ==
Spell Capital Partner's portfolio companies received three nominations for Deal of the Year from Buyouts Magazine, one for Turnaround Deal of the Year, and another for Small Market Deal of the Year. During 2020, Spell's mezzanine group was named "SBIC Firm of the Year" by the United States Small Business Administration (SBA). Spell Capital was named to the "Top 50 PE Firms in the Middle Market" each year between 2018 and 2023. In 2019, Inc Magazine included Spell Capital in its top 50 Private Equity firms.
