= Helen Keller Services for the Blind =

American organization

Helen Keller Services for the Blind is an American organization that helps blind people as the Industrial Home for Blind Men in 1893; some of the clients also have other disabilities. It was founded in Brooklyn, New York, and also has offices in Hempstead and Huntington, Long Island. It also operates the Helen Keller National Center for Deaf-Blind Youths and Adults in Sands Point, New York.

== Historyj ==
On October 1, 1893, the Industrial Home for Blind Men was founded by Eben Porter Morford; he became the superintendent. By 1894 seventeen blind men lived in the home. In 1952, IHB established a braille and large print textbook library for children. Also in 1952, George Hellinger opened the first Low Vision Eye Service within a blindness agency. In 1953 a summer day camp was started. In 1967 IHB opened a preschool for children.

During the 1960s, IHB founded the federally funded Anne Sullivan Macy Service for people who were deaf-blind. In 1967 the Helen Keller National Center was established by a unanimous act of Congress, and IHB was chosen to operate the program, which provided comprehensive rehabilitation training for people with a severe dual sensory loss or impairment.

In 1983, IHB established a day treatment program for adults who are developmentally disabled and who are also blind or deaf-blind. In 1985, the Board of Trustees renamed the organization to the Helen Keller Services for the Blind.
