= National Register of Historic Places listings in Lawrence County, Indiana =

Location of Lawrence County in Indiana

This is a list of the National Register of Historic Places listings in Lawrence County, Indiana.

This is intended to be a complete list of the properties and districts on the National Register of Historic Places in Lawrence County, Indiana, United States. Latitude and longitude coordinates are provided for many National Register properties and districts; these locations may be seen together in a map.

There are 16 properties and districts listed on the National Register in the county.

Properties and districts located in incorporated areas display the name of the municipality, while properties and districts in unincorporated areas display the name of their civil township. Properties and districts split between multiple jurisdictions display the names of all jurisdictions.

This National Park Service list is complete through NPS recent listings posted August 29, 2025.

== Current listings ==
	Name on the Register	Image	Date listed	Location	City or town	Description
1	Bedford Courthouse Square Historic District	Bedford Courthouse Square Historic District	June 8, 1995 (#95000704)	Roughly bounded by L, 14th, 17th and H Sts. 38°51′42″N 86°29′01″W	Bedford	
2	Bedford Northside Residential Historic District		August 26, 2024 (#100010741)	Roughly bounded by the alley between 13th Street and 14th Street to the north, L Street to the east, 16th Street/US 50/IN 450 to the south, and O Street to the west 38°51′44″N 86°29′23″W	Bedford	
3	Bedford Southern Indiana Railroad Passenger Depot		May 13, 2021 (#100006563)	1415 J St. 38°51′47″N 86°29′03″W	Bedford	
4	Bono Archaeological Site (12 Lr 194)	Bono Archaeological Site (12 Lr 194)	May 30, 1985 (#85001166)	On a bluff above the White River, ½ mile west of the riverbank and 1 mile north of Bono; 38°44′41″N 86°19′42″W	Bono Township	
5	Clampitt Site	Clampitt Site	March 15, 2016 (#16000076)	Address Restricted	Guthrie Township	
6	Green Hill Cemetery		May 19, 2025 (#100011863)	1202 18th Street; 38°51′31″N 86°29′14″W	Bedford	
7	Helton-Mayo Farm	Helton-Mayo Farm	June 9, 1995 (#95000709)	Junction of Boyd Ln. and State Road 58, northeast of Bedford; 38°53′11″N 86°27′05″W	Shawswick Township	
8	Indiana Limestone Company Building	Indiana Limestone Company Building	December 21, 1993 (#93001412)	405 I St. 38°52′31″N 86°29′00″W	Bedford	
9	Madden School	Madden School	June 15, 2000 (#00000673)	620 H St. 38°52′21″N 86°28′53″W	Bedford	
10	Mitchell Downtown Historic District	Mitchell Downtown Historic District	September 26, 1997 (#97001175)	Roughly bounded by 10th, Oak, 5th, and N. Mississippi Sts. 38°44′00″N 86°28′28″W	Mitchell	
11	Mitchell Opera House	Mitchell Opera House	April 2, 1981 (#81000020)	7th and Brooks Sts. 38°44′04″N 86°28′27″W	Mitchell	
12	C.S. Norton Mansion	C.S. Norton Mansion	June 22, 1976 (#76000026)	1415 15th St. 38°51′45″N 86°29′28″W	Bedford	
13	Otis Park and Golf Course	Otis Park and Golf Course	December 20, 2002 (#02001560)	Tunnelton Rd. 38°51′31″N 86°27′17″W	Bedford	
14	William A. Ragsdale House	William A. Ragsdale House	December 20, 2002 (#02001565)	607 Tunnelton Rd. 38°51′32″N 86°27′36″W	Bedford	
15	Williams Bridge	Williams Bridge	November 9, 1981 (#81000018)	Southwest of Williams on County Road 11; 38°47′48″N 86°39′54″W	Spice Valley Township	
16	Zahn Historic District	Zahn Historic District	August 28, 1998 (#98001100)	Roughly bounded by 17th, 20th, J., and H Sts. 38°51′29″N 86°28′57″W	Bedford	

== See also ==
- List of National Historic Landmarks in Indiana
- National Register of Historic Places listings in Indiana
- Listings in neighboring counties: Greene, Jackson, Martin, Monroe, Orange, Washington
- List of Indiana state historical markers in Lawrence County
