= List of Indiana state historical markers in Lawrence County =

Location of Lawrence County in Indiana

This is a list of the Indiana state historical markers in Lawrence County.

This is intended to be a complete list of the official state historical markers placed in Lawrence County, Indiana, United States by the Indiana Historical Bureau. The locations of the historical markers and their latitude and longitude coordinates are included below when available, along with their names, years of placement, and topics as recorded by the Historical Bureau. There are 4 historical markers located in Lawrence County.

== Historical markers ==
Marker title	Image	Year placed	Location	Topics
Indiana (Oolitic) Limestone Quarries		1966	Oolitic Town Hall on Main Street between Lafayette and Hoosier Avenues in Oolitic; 38°54′3″N 86°31′36″W	Business, Industry, and Labor, Nature and Natural Disasters
Astronaut Virgil I. Grissom April 3, 1926 - January 27, 1967		1967	Virgil I. Grissom Municipal Airport in Bedford; 38°50′18″N 86°26′9″W	Science, Medicine, and Inventions, Transportation
Bedford Courthouse Square Historic District		1998	Along the "I" Street sidewalk between 15th and 16th Streets on the eastern side of the Lawrence County Courthouse square in Bedford; 38°51′42″N 86°28′57.5″W	Government Institutions, Buildings and Architecture
Dunn Memorial Hospital		2005	1600 23rd St. in Bedford; 38°51′12″N 86°29′38″W	Science, Medicine, and Inventions, Buildings and Architecture

== See also ==
- List of Indiana state historical markers
- National Register of Historic Places listings in Lawrence County, Indiana
