= Bryantsville =

Bryantsville may refer to:

- Bryantsville, Indiana
- Bryantsville, Kentucky
