= Oakland City University =

Private university in Oakland City, Indiana, US

- Former name: Oakland City College (1885–1995)
- Motto: Enter to Learn, Go Forth to Serve
- Type: Private university
- Established: 1885
- Religious affiliation: General Association of General Baptists
- Endowment: $0
- President: Ron D. Dempsey
- Faculty: >100
- Students: 143
- Undergraduates: 0
- Postgraduates: 143
- Location: Oakland City, Indiana, U.S. 38.3399°N 87.3518°W
- Campus: Small town
- Colors: Columbia Blue, Navy Blue & White
- Nickname: Mighty Oaks
- Sporting affiliations: NAIA – River States ECAC – eSports
- Mascot: Oakie
- Website: www.oak.edu

Oakland City University (OCU) was a private university affiliated with the General Baptist Church and located in Oakland City, Indiana, United States. It was the only General Baptist Church-affiliated college or university in the United States. Founded in 1885, it slowly grew to a total enrollment of about 640 by Fall 2024.

In addition to the institution's Oakland City main campus, the university previously operated satellite campuses in Evansville, Indianapolis, Rockport and Bedford. These sites offered courses at an accelerated pace and condensed format. The Bedford campus was housed in the former headquarters of the Indiana Limestone Company until it was moved to the StoneGate Arts & Education Center in 2018 and later closed. The Evansville site closed in 2025.

The university announced layoffs for over 100 employees and the suspension of all undergraduate programs on May 19, 2026.

== History ==
In June 1885, the Educational Board of General Baptists organized and then gained a charter from the state of Indiana to operate a college at Oakland City. However, because of a lack of funds, the first building, a two-story brick structure housing the administration and classrooms, was not complete until 1891—the same year Oakland City College opened its doors for classes. In those early days, the school was called "the college on the hill."

By the mid-1920s, the school had reached a zenith for the first half of the century. There were several college buildings gracing the grounds, including an expanded administration building, Wheatley Hall, a women's dorm, a field house, Memorial Gym (which housed a library in the basement), Cronbach Hall, a building used for agricultural and industrial arts classes, and a two-story brick building called the president's house. Beside the normal, liberal arts and theological school, the college had added a large industrial and agricultural department to respond to the vocational needs of the rural area it served. The college offered several sports and clubs, and enrollment during this period often exceeded 1,000 students a semester.

The Great Depression hit the school hard, and faculty and staff often forwent paychecks to keep the school running. The end of World War II and the GI Bill saw a resurgence in enrollment and, by the mid-1960s, the "college on the hill" experienced an upswing comparable to the 1920s. Several new buildings were constructed on the campus including four dormitories, a new library, Brengle Hall, a science building, and Stinson Hall.

By the fall term of 1973, enrollment had dropped considerably. The sponsoring denomination, the General Baptists, made a successful effort to raise funds to keep the school open and hired James Murray as the college president. In the 1990s, the college moved to university status under Murray's leadership. Currently the school has an enrollment of 655 and has seen the construction of two new buildings within the last five years. The university stands fully accredited and offers five graduate degrees and over 40 undergraduate programs.

In April 2026, the university filed a WARN Act notice effective June 1, 2026, laying off over 100 employees. In May 2026, the university began missing employee paychecks. Despite this, the university states it has entered a strategic partnership to avoid closure. The university announced layoffs for over 100 employees and the termination of all undergraduate programs on May 19, 2026.

=== Presidents ===
- A.D. Williams, 1889–1894
- Joseph B. Cox, (acting) 1895–1903
- William P. Dearing, 1903–1945
- James E. Cox, 1945–1955
- Onis G. Chapman, 1955–1965
- Carl E. Shepard, 1965–1968
- Ben M. Elrod, 1968–1970
- Laurence N. Barrett, (acting) 1970–1971
- Bernard A. Loposer, 1971–1973
- James W. Murray, 1974–2007
- Alton D. Davis, (acting) 2007–2008
- Ray G. Barber, 2008–2019
- Ron D. Dempsey, 2019–present

== Academics ==
Oakland City University is accredited by the Higher Learning Commission and Association of Theological Schools. Business programs on the main campus are accredited by the International Assembly for Collegiate Business Education. However, it has voluntarily submitted its resignation effective August 15, 2026 for ATS, and June 30, 2027, for HLC.

=== Schools and departments ===
- School of Arts and Sciences
- School of Education
- School of Business
- School of Adult and Extended Learning
- Chapman School of Religious Studies

==== Honors program ====
Oakland City's honors program focuses on leadership, internships, and public service.

=== Indiana Department of Correction ===
OCU previously offered classes for incarcerated individuals within Indiana Department of Correction-owned facilities in Southern Indiana.

== Campus ==
OCU's campus is located in the northwest area of Oakland City. Historically, the campus was centered around the present day Bower-Suhrheinrich Library, Bell Tower, Dearing Hall, Provance Memorial Chapel, and Cockrum Hall. Until the 2000s, the majority of OCU's buildings were located along or adjacent to the present greenspace. Former buildings on this greenspace included Wheatley Hall, Memorial Gym, Brengle Hall, and Stinson Hall. In addition to its on campus sites, the university operated the off-campus Oakland City University Foundation Building and the Wilder Center which also housed the Oakland City Police Department. The off campus buildings were listed for sale in May 2026.

=== Student life ===
The Student Government Association (SGA) is the presiding student government body.

==== Clubs & organizations ====
Oakland City University features over 30 clubs that enhances university experience outside of the classroom. These clubs include the Black Student Union, International Club, Intervarsity, and The Well.

=== Rankings ===
In 2025 the U.S. News & World Report ranked Oakland City fifth in the nation for social mobility.

=== Recent construction ===
Oakland City completed a new upperclassman residence hall in the summer of 2019, which was subsequently named Williams Hall in namesake for the adjacent street. In 2023, the university constructed a new residence hall for lowerclassmen.

=== Branch Centers ===
==== OCU Bedford ====
Oakland City University's Bedford Center previously operated in the former headquarters of the Indiana Limestone Company before relocating to the StoneGate Arts & Education Center, and closing in 2023. The site focused on adult & extended learning in a non-traditional format.

==== OCU Indianapolis ====
Oakland City University's Indianapolis Center (OCUIndy) was previously located at 5665 N. Post Road in Indianapolis before closing sometime after 2012. The site focused on adult & extended learning in a non-traditional format.

==== OCU Evansville ====
Oakland City University's Evansville Center was previously located at 110 S. Green River Road in Evansville before relocating to 401 Southeast 6th Street in Downtown Evansville in 2020. The site focused on adult & extending learning in a non-traditional format. The Evansville Center closed in 2025.

==== OCU Rockport ====
Oakland City University's Rockport center was previously located at 954 State Road 66 in Rockport, Indiana before relocating to another location and closing sometime in 2023. The site focused on adult & extending learning in a non-traditional format.

==== Other locations ====
Oakland City University previously operated centers in Jasper, Plainfield, and at Toyota Manufacturing Indiana.

== Athletics ==
The Oakland City (OCU) athletic teams were called the Mighty Oaks. The university was a member of the National Association of Intercollegiate Athletics (NAIA), primarily competing in the River States Conference (RSC) from 2020–21 to 2025–26; which they were a member on a previous stint from 1968–69 to 1974–75. They were also a member of the National Christian College Athletic Association (NCCAA), primarily competing as an independent in the Mid-East Region of the Division I level. The Mighty Oaks were previously an Independent within the Division II ranks of the National Collegiate Athletic Association (NCAA) from about 2006–07 until 2019–20.

Oakland City competed in 23 intercollegiate varsity sports. Sprint football, a variant of American football that restricts player weights to 178 pounds (81 kg) and is governed outside of any national all-sports governing body, was added in 2023, competing in the Midwest Sprint Football League. In 2025, Oakland City announced the addition of a men's and women's swim program with the intention to compete beginning in the 2026–27 school year.

=== Facilities ===
Men's and women's basketball, along with men's and women's volleyball play at the 1,000 seat Johnson Center.

The baseball team plays at Konkler Field, which began renovations in 2023. The softball team plays at the off campus East Gibson Girls' Softball League Field (EGGSL Field).

=== List of teams ===
Men's sports	Women's sports
Band	Band
Baseball	Basketball
Basketball	Cheerleading
Cheerleading	Cross Country
Cross Country	eSports
eSports	Golf
Golf	Soccer
Soccer	Softball
Sprint Football	Tennis
Tennis	Track & Field
Track & Field	Volleyball
Volleyball	

=== National championships ===
- NLCAA Men's Basketball – 1981
- NCCAA Division I Men's Basketball – 1999

== Notable alumni ==
- Gary Barrett, ecologist. Former chair of Odum School of Ecology at University of Georgia.
- Walid Birrou, professional soccer player.
- Gary Denbo, former Major League Baseball coach.
- Ernie Haase, gospel singer.
- Travis Hendrix, member of the Alabama House of Representatives.
- Gil Hodges, former Major League Baseball player for the Brooklyn Dodgers, Los Angeles Dodgers, and New York Mets.
- Lindel Hume, former Indiana senator.
- Wilbur Kitchener Jordan, president of Radcliffe College (1943–1960).
- Melba Phillips, physicist and early contributor to nuclear science. A dedicated historical marker is located on the college's campus.
- Jerry Reynolds, former head coach of the Sacramento Kings. National Basketball Association executive.
- Wade Williams, member of the Kentucky House of Representatives.
