= Williams, Lawrence County, Indiana =

Williams, Indiana
- Census-designated place
- Location in Lawrence County, Indiana
- Coordinates: 38°48′48″N 86°39′05″W
- Country: United States
- State: Indiana
- County: Lawrence
- Township: Spice Valley

Area
  - Total: 3.58 sq mi (9.27 km^{2})
  - Land: 3.58 sq mi (9.26 km^{2})
  - Water: 0.0039 sq mi (0.01 km^{2})
- Elevation: 538 ft (164 m)

Population (2020)
  - Total: 234
  - Density: 64.1/sq mi (24.73/km^{2})
- ZIP code: 47470
- FIPS code: 18-84338
- GNIS feature ID: 2583476

Williams is an unincorporated town and census-designated place in Spice Valley Township, Lawrence County, Indiana, United States. As of the 2010 census, the population was 286.

Williams is situated on the East Fork of the White River. Williams is home to Williams Dam, a hydroelectric dam that once powered the electricity for stone industries across southern Indiana, especially in nearby Bedford and Bloomington.

== History ==
The Williams post office was established in 1876. Byrd E. Williams was an early postmaster. Williams was platted in 1889. From 1910 to 1911, Williams Dam was being built on the East Fork of the White River. It was finally opened in 1913, giving electricity to stone industries in the region. The dam did this for almost four decades until being decommissioned in the 1950s. Almost 60 years later, Free Flow Power Corp., a startup company from Boston, looked into recommissioning the dam, giving the area a renewable energy power. The corporation planned to spend over $12 million by installing turbines on the plant. That plan was abandoned in 2018.

== Geography ==
Williams is located in western Lawrence County in the northern part of Spice Valley Township. The census-designated place contains the town center of Williams along Indiana State Road 450, just north of the East Fork of the White River, but includes rural land to the north, east, and west. The CDP extends east to Crooked Creek, west to Dillman Road, and north to a high-tension power line. According to the U.S. Census Bureau, the CDP has a total area of 3.6 square miles (9.3 km^{2}), of which 2.01 acres (8,135 m^{2}), or 0.09%, are water.

Via SR 450, Williams is 11 miles (18 km) southwest of Bedford, the Lawrence county seat, and 22 miles (35 km) northeast of Loogootee.

== Williams Bridge ==
The Williams Bridge, also known as the Lawrence County Bridge, was the longest double-span covered bridge open to traffic in Indiana. It crosses the East Fork of the White River, in Section 7, Township 4 North, and Range 2 West, 1 mile (1.6 km) southwest of Williams. This double-span Howe truss structure has a length of 373 feet (114 m), or 402 feet (123 m) including the 13-foot (4.0 m) overhang at each end, with a portal clearance 16 feet (4.9 m) wide by 12 feet 6 inches (3.81 m) high. Built in 1884 by Joseph J. Daniels, the bridge receives its name from the nearby town, which was named in honor of early settler Isaac Williams. Though no historical marker is present, the Williams Bridge was added to the National Register of Historic Places in 1981 and is listed as #14-47-02 in the 1989 World Guide.

The Williams Bridge was totally refurbished in 2013 but has remained closed to vehicular traffic since around September 20, 2010. The Medora Bridge at 434 feet (132 m), in Jackson County, remains the longest covered bridge in the state, but it was closed to all but pedestrian traffic in 1972.

== Demographics ==
Historical population
Census	Pop.	Note	%±
2010	286		—
2020	229		−19.9%
U.S. Decennial Census
