= William Ragsdale (disambiguation) =

William Ragsdale (born 1961) is an American actor.

William Ragsdale may also refer to:

- William P. Ragsdale (1837–1877), Hawaiian lawyer and translator
- William A. Ragsdale House

== See also ==
- William Ragsdale Cannon (1916–1997), American United Methodist bishop
