= Avoca Park =

Park in Indiana, United States

Avoca Park and Recreation
- Previously known as Avoca State Fish Hatchery
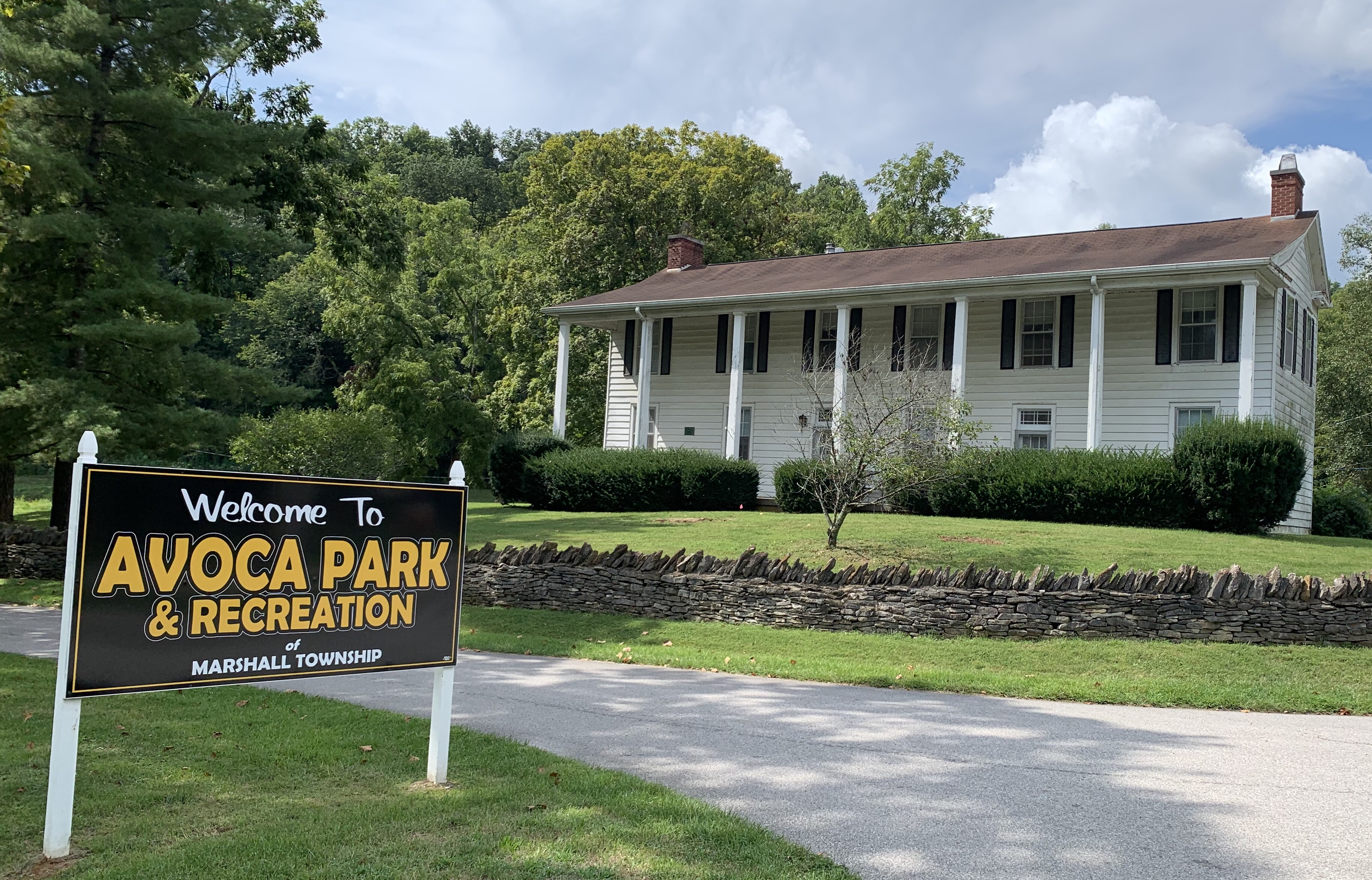
- 1823 house

- Location within Indiana
- Interactive map of Avoca Park and Recreation
- Location: 3178 Avoca-Eureka Road Avoca, Indiana 47420
- Nearest town: Avoca, Indiana
- Coordinates: 38°54′25.79″N 86°32′31.19″W
- Area: 43 acres (17 ha)
- Established: 2020
- Operator: Avoca Park and Recreation of Marshall Township

Avoca Park and Recreation of Marshall Township, is a recreation area in Lawrence County, Indiana that includes walking, hiking trails and picnic areas. Open year-round, dawn until dusk.

The park consists of approximately 43 acres (17 ha) of land including forests, 13 ponds, three buildings and a cemetery dating back to the Civil War.

The property has 13 earthen ponds fed by a natural spring. Grass levees circle each of the ponds providing a winding path around all the ponds. Wooded hiking paths allow access to the Civil War Cemetery and a WPA stone overlooks. A gravel path along a Works Progress Administration (WPA) built stone wall leads to the shelter house that overlooks the ponds.

A two-story colonial-style house built in 1823 sits near the spring. Stone structures, walls and a stone overlook, built by the Works Progress Administration (WPA), give hikers a view of the old hatchery grounds.

== History ==
A grist mill was constructed by a man named Fitzpatrick in 1819 and was later purchased by the Hamer brothers, two of the first settlers in Avoca, Indiana. Thomas Hamer and his 4 sons were pioneer settlers in the area including, Spring Mill State Park, located 30 miles south of Avoca, where they lived and operated a still working grist mill. The mill was made possible by a spring-fed turbine water-wheel fitted with three sets of buhr stones to grind wheat, corn, and chop feed. In 1823, they built a two-story house on the property. The house later became an inn, stagecoach way station, post office, grocery store and finally the DNR property manager's residence. It was last renovated in 1923.

The property was purchased by the Indiana Department of Natural Resources (DNR) from Hayden Bridwell in 1919 and construction of fish hatchery ponds began in 1923. A service building was built in 1924.

The National Youth Administration was stationed at Avoca Fish Hatchery from 1935 to 1942 . During that period the improvements to Avoca Fish Hatchery was one of the longest National Youth Administration projects. The National Youth Administration built the shelter house with limestone walls and a limestone fireplace.

The hatchery stocked Indiana's waters with largemouth bass, bluegill, red-eared sunfish and black crappie for years until Indiana DNR began the process of decommissioning in 2013 and it fell into disrepair. During operation, the hatchery produced 500,000 to 1 million fish.

In 2014, when the state and county had no interest in maintaining the property, Bedford, Indiana Mayor Shawna Girgis tasked Bedford Parks and Recreation Director, Barry Jeskewich, to develop a strategy to preserve this historic property for public use. Barry Jeskewich partnered with Dr. James Farmer and select students of Indiana University to conduct a feasibility study of the property. The project was a collaboration between the IU students in SPH-0305: Integrated Resource Management and Avoca State Fish Hatchery as part of the 2017-2018 Indiana University Sustaining Hoosier Communities initiative within the IU Center for Rural Engagement.

In 2019, Girgis and Jeskewich partnered with local forester, Sam Bond to establish the Lawrence County Park Foundation. Later that year, the group was awarded a $125,000 grant from the Regional Opportunity Initiative Inc, to preserve this beloved green space for the surrounding Town of Avoca and the Lawrence County community. Marshal Township has approved a tax levy that will help generate some revenue to help maintain park grounds.

With the stewardship of Sam Bond and the Marshall Township Trustees, the citizens approved the establishment of the Marshall Township Park Board, thus allowing governance to receive the property from the State of Indiana in 2020. Avoca Park became Lawrence County's first public park, featuring a 1.5 mile loop trail, picnic tables, green spaces, a rentable shelter and event spaces.

Avoca State Fish Hatchery was renamed Avoca Park and Recreation and is now in the hands of the Avoca Park and Recreation of Marshall Township.

== Gallery ==
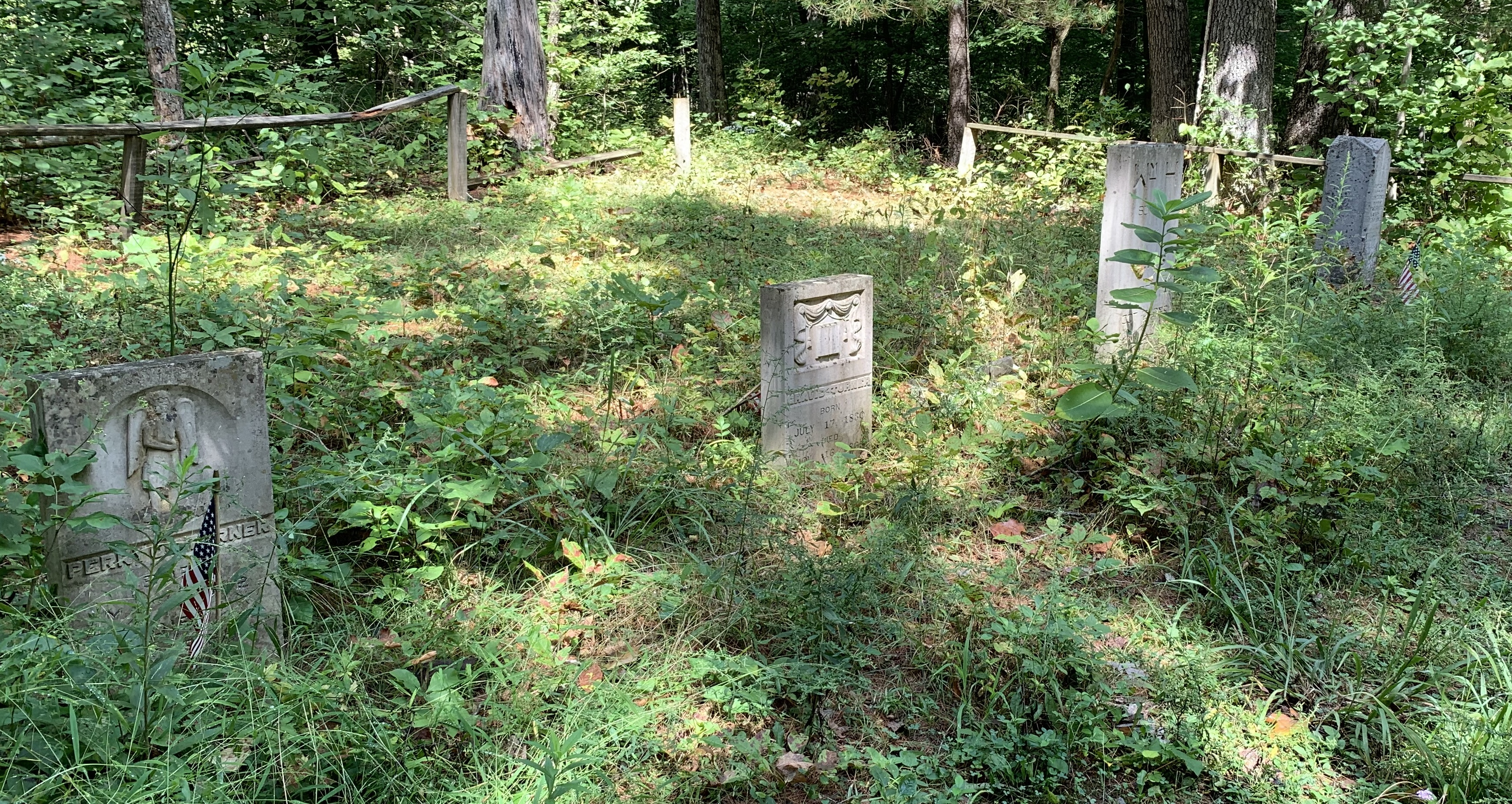
Avoca Park Civil war cemetery

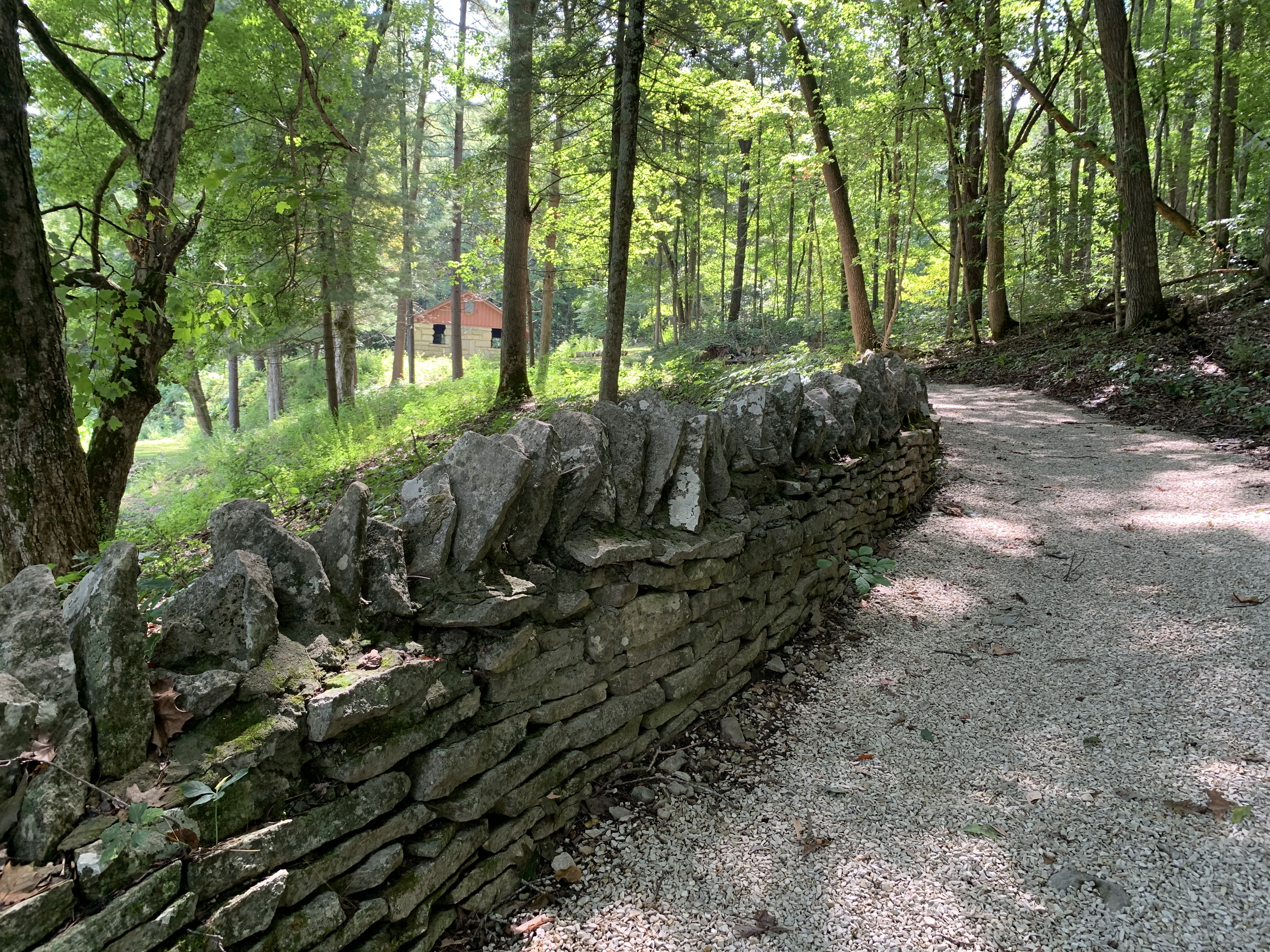
Avoca Park WPA stone wall

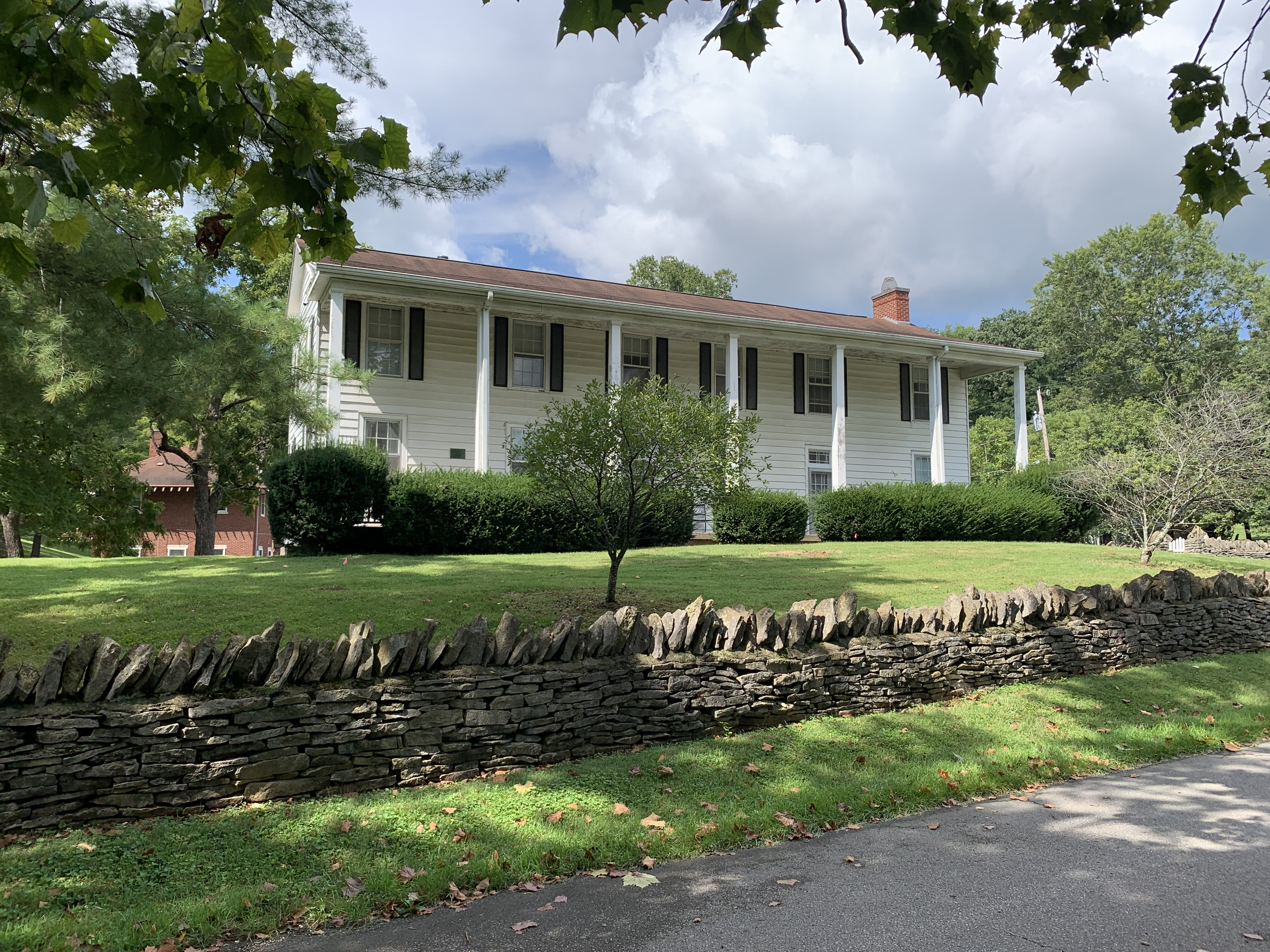
Avoca Park 1823 house built by the Hamer brothers

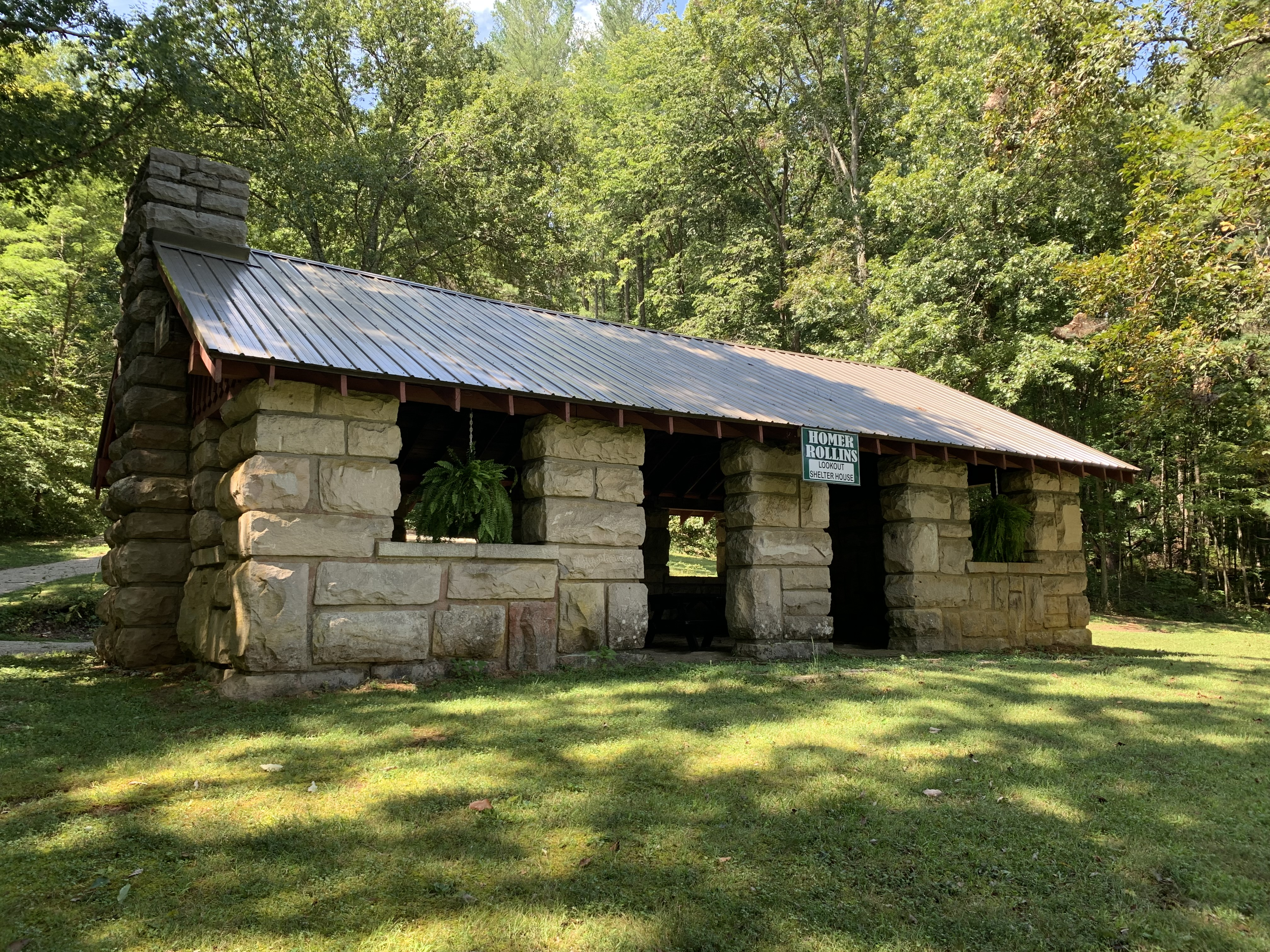
Avoca Park National Youth Administration built stone shelter house

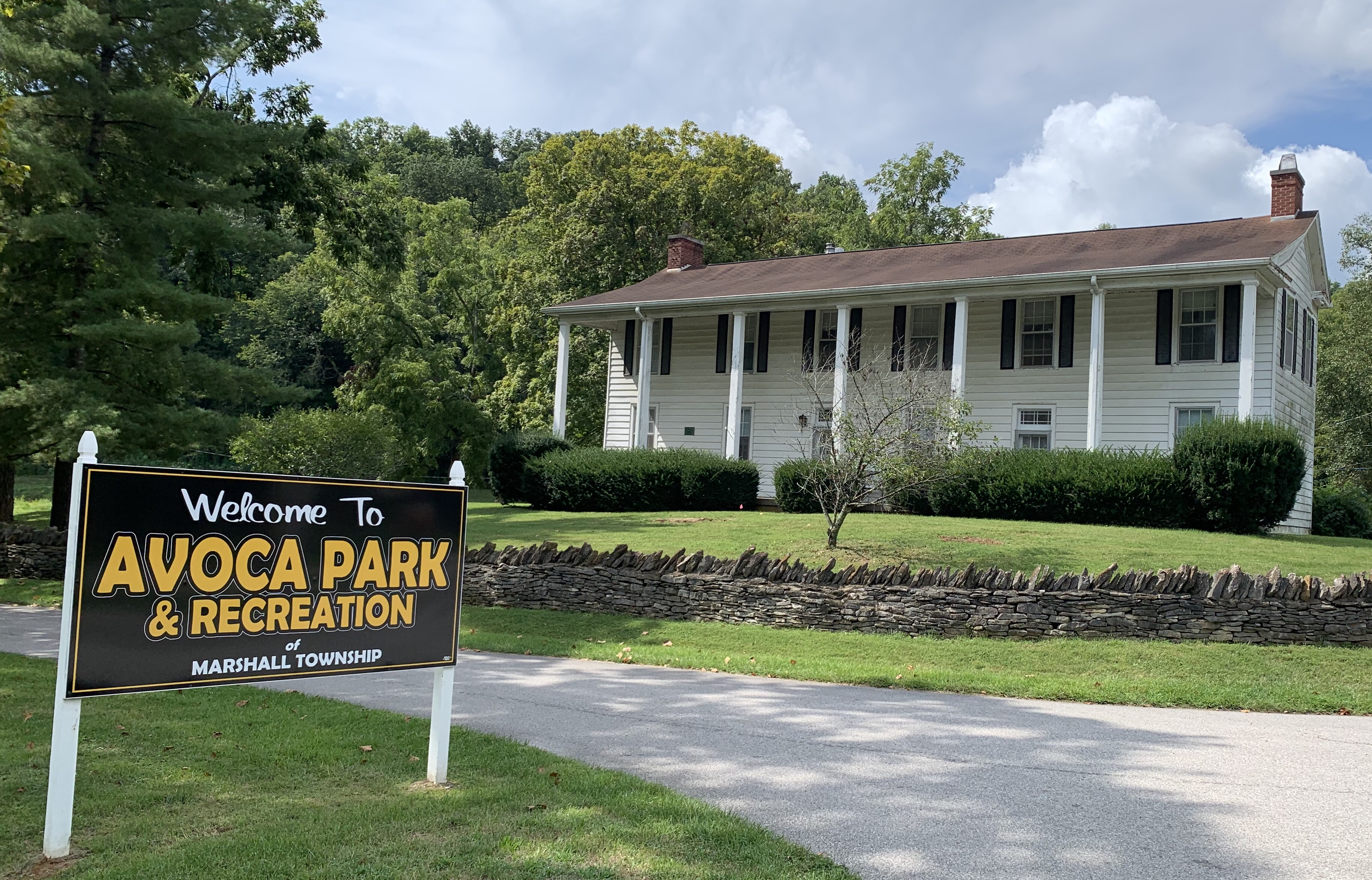
Avoca Park 1823 house

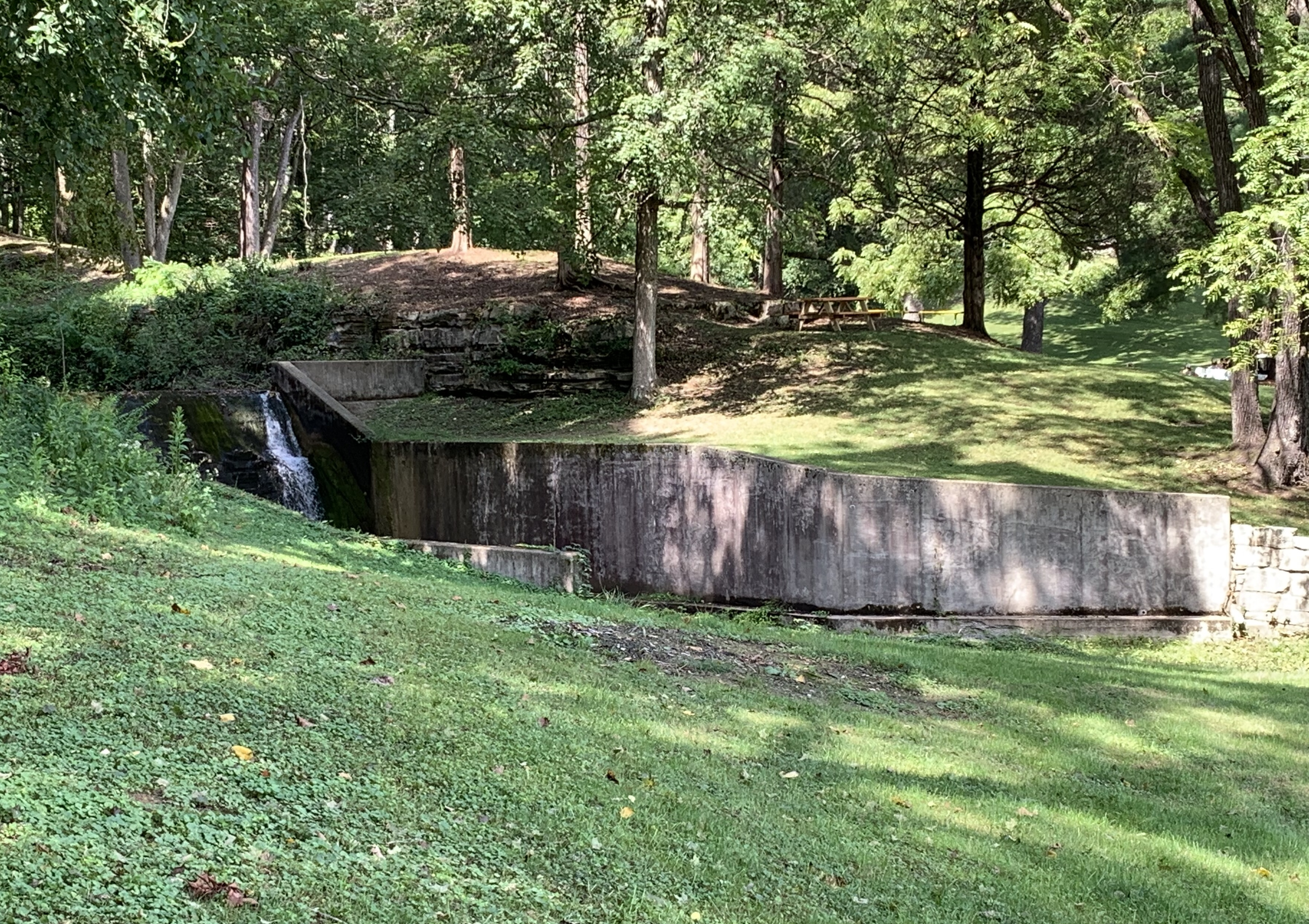
Avoca Park Creek and Falls

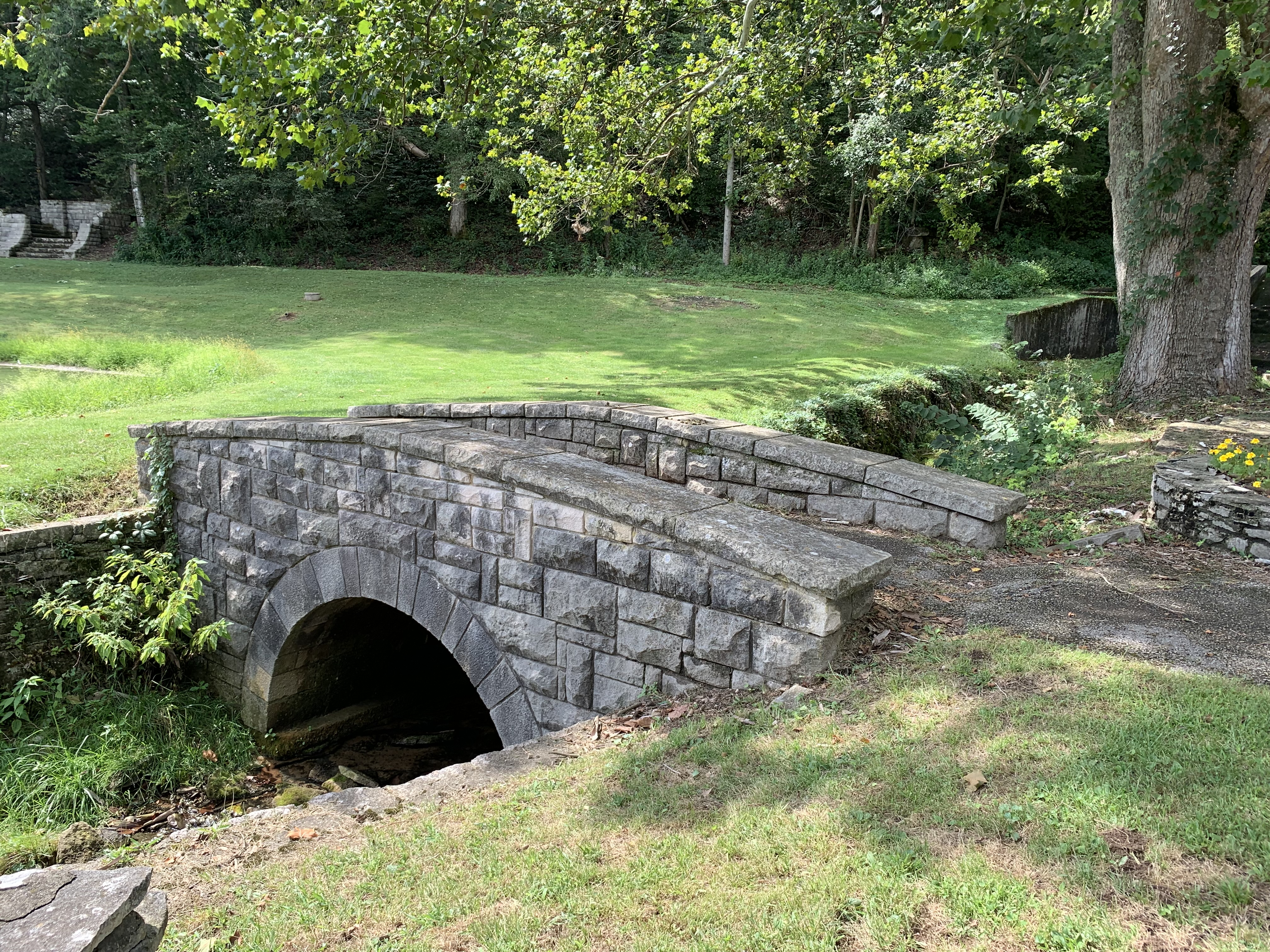
Avoca Park WPA built bridge

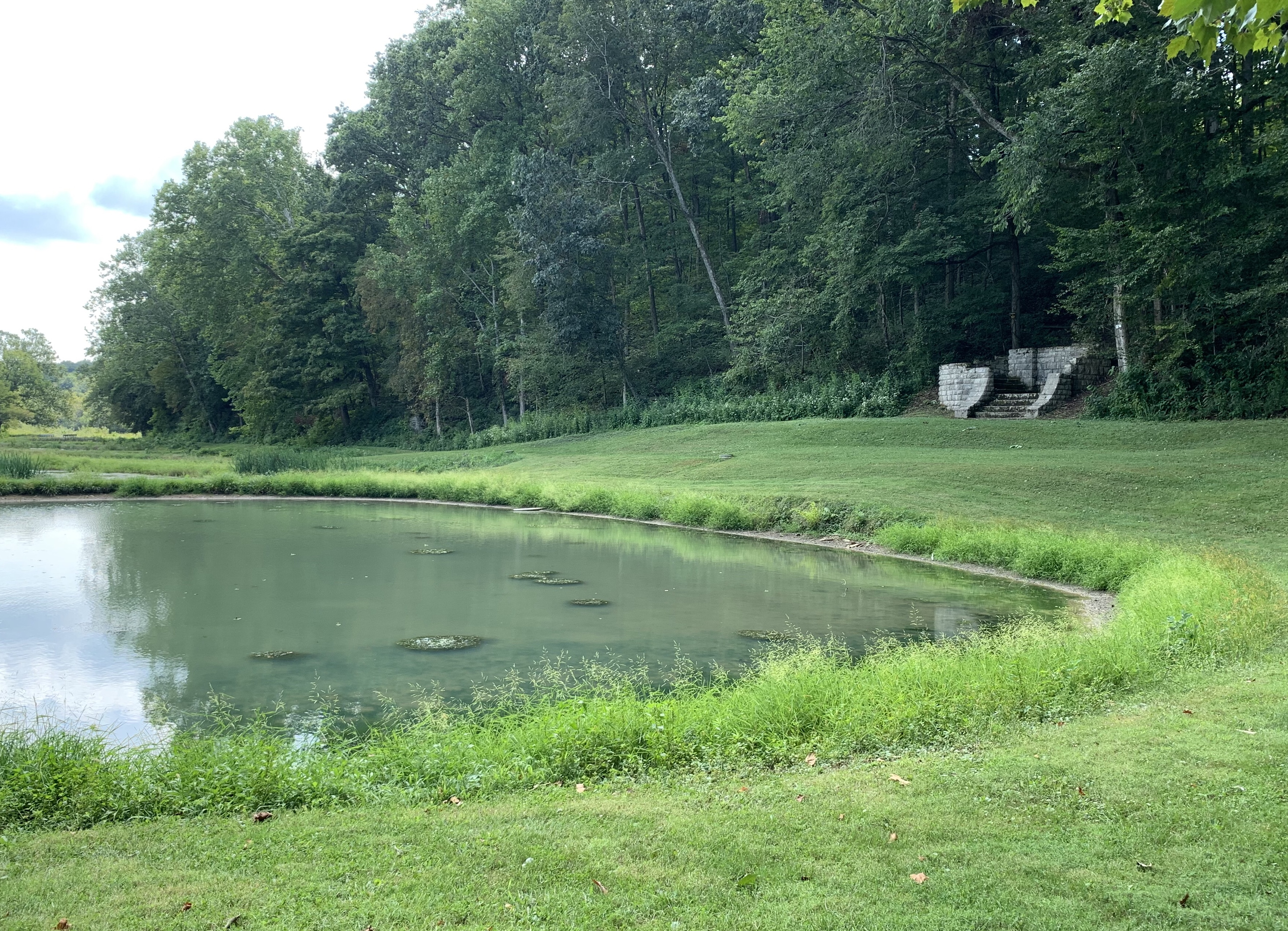
Avoca Park earthen pond once used as fish hatchery
