= Williams Bridge =

- U.S. National Register of Historic Places
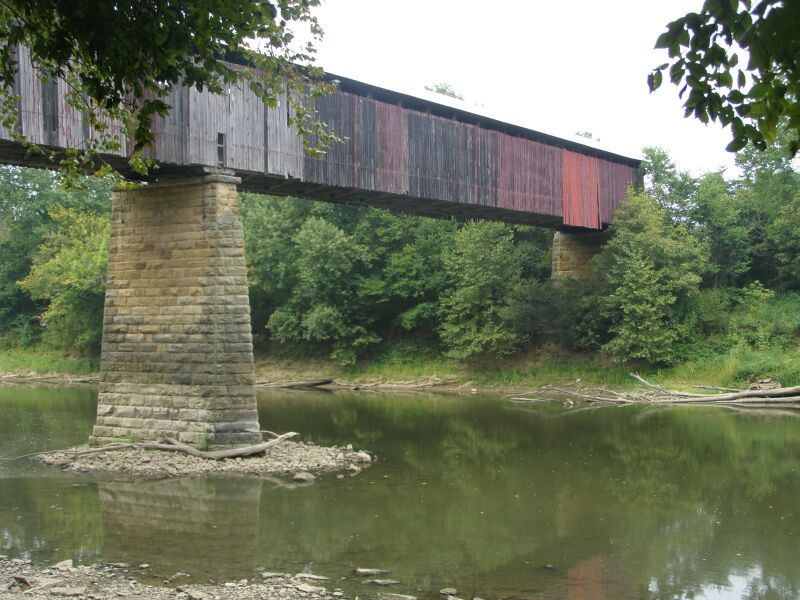

- Location within Indiana Location within the United States
- Nearest city: Southwest of Williams on County Road 11, Spice Valley Township, Lawrence County, Indiana
- Coordinates: 38°47′49″N 86°39′53″W
- Built: 1884
- Architect: Joseph J. Daniels
- Architectural style: Howe Truss
- NRHP reference No.: 81000018
- Added to NRHP: November 9, 1981

The Williams Bridge is a historic wooden covered bridge built in 1884, located in southern Indiana.

== Location ==
The Williams Bridge is situated in Spice Valley Township, Lawrence County, Indiana, spanning the East Fork of the White River on Huron and Williams Road, south of State Road 450. It is located near the unincorporated town of Williams, approximately two miles downriver from the Williams Dam and eight miles southwest of Bedford.

== Construction ==
The bridge features a Howe Truss design and was constructed in 1884 by Joseph 'J.J.' Daniels. It consists of two spans totalling 373 feet (114 m) in length, with a deck width of 14.7 feet (4.5 m) and a vertical clearance of 19.2 feet (5.9 m) above the deck.

== History ==
In 1981, the bridge was listed on the National Register of Historic Places. At the time, it was the longest covered bridge in Indiana still open to vehicular traffic. However, the bridge was closed to traffic on September 20, 2010. Although the Medora Bridge in Jackson County, at 434 feet (132 m), remains the longest covered bridge in the state, it has been closed to all but pedestrian traffic since 1972.
