= Thomas J. Box =

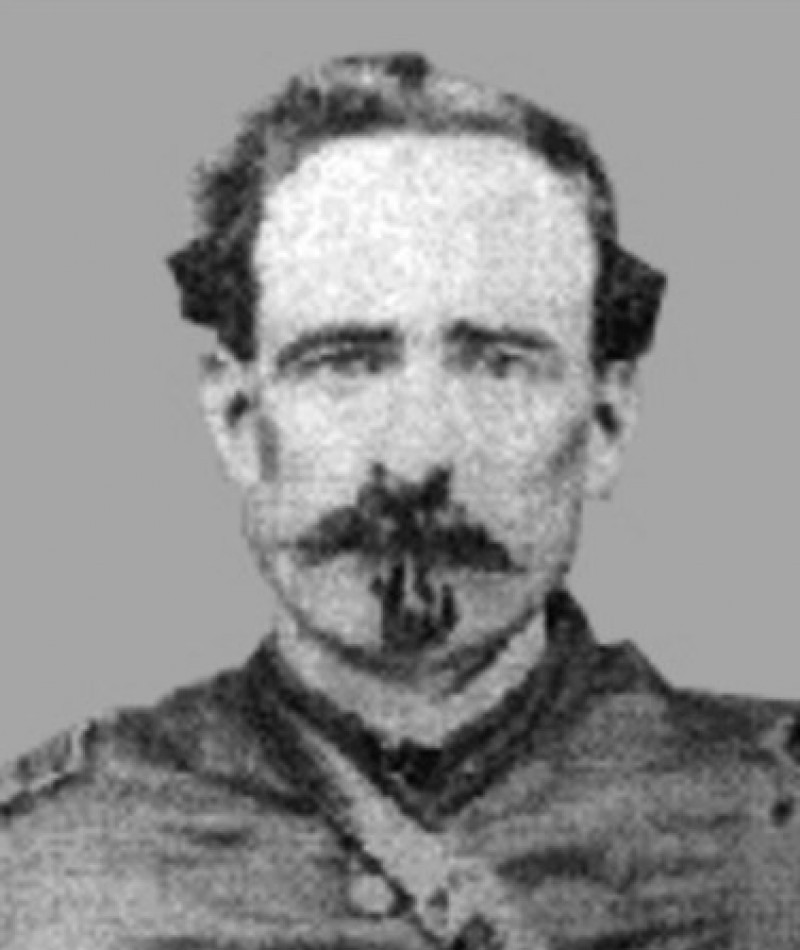
- Born: November 7, 1833
- Died: December 18, 1914 (aged 81)
- Military career
- Allegiance: United States of America
- Branch: United States Army
- Rank: Captain
- Unit: 27th Regiment Indiana Volunteer Infantry - Company D
- Conflicts: Battle of Resaca
- Awards: Medal of Honor

Captain Thomas J. Box (November 7, 1833 – December 18, 1914) was an American soldier who fought in the American Civil War. Box received the country's highest award for bravery during combat, the Medal of Honor, for his action during the Battle of Resaca in Georgia on 14 May 1864. He was honored with the award on 7 April 1865.

== Biography ==
Box was born on 7 November 1833 in Indiana. He enlisted into the 27th Indiana Infantry at Bedford, Indiana. He died on 18 December 1914 in Indianapolis and his remains are interred at the Green Hill Cemetery in Indiana.

== Medal of Honor citation ==
Capture of flag of the 38th Alabama Infantry (C.S.A.).

== See also ==
- List of American Civil War Medal of Honor recipients: A–F
