= Bono, Indiana =

Bono may refer to places in the U.S. state of Indiana:

- Bono, Lawrence County, Indiana
- Bono Township, Lawrence County, Indiana
- Bono, Vermillion County, Indiana
