= Wilbur Kitchener Jordan =

American historian

Wilbur Kitchener Jordan (also known as W. K. Jordan), (1902-1980) was an American historian, specializing in sixteenth and seventeenth century Britain.

Raised in Lynnville, Indiana, Jordan received a bachelor's degree from Oakland City College in 1923, before earning a master's (1926) and doctoral (1931) degree from Harvard University. Jordan went on to become a leading historian of sixteenth and seventeenth century England, accruing many honors, and producing books, including Men of Substance: Revolutionary Thinkers of 1640 (1942), Philanthropy in England, 1480-1660 (1959), and a two-volume study of the reign of Edward VI : Edward VI:The Threshold of Power (1968, 1970).

Jordan's most enduring scholarly work, however, has been his four-volume The Development of Religious Toleration in England, published from 1932 to 1940, in which Jordan documented the origins of religious toleration in Elizabethan, Stuart, and revolutionary England and the evolution of these ideas into the late seventeenth century, following the English Civil War. Though sometimes criticized for attributing too great an importance to skeptical and secular motives for toleration, this capacious and well-sourced work continues to provide the foundation for contemporary studies of the history of religious toleration in England.

In 1943, Kitchener declined the presidency of the prestigious Scripps College, and chose instead to become the fourth President of Radcliffe College (1943-1960). As President of Radcliffe College from 1943 to 1960, Jordan presided over a period of dramatic change at this prestigious women's college, promoting greater integration with nearby Harvard University and the adoption of a liberal arts curriculum, and becoming an early advocate of providing education for women essentially identical to that traditionally provided for men. Jordan's students, including Natalie Zemon Davis, benefited from this teaching philosophy.

== Awards and honors ==
- 1969: Corresponding Fellow of the British Academy.
