= Huron, Indiana =

- Census-designated place
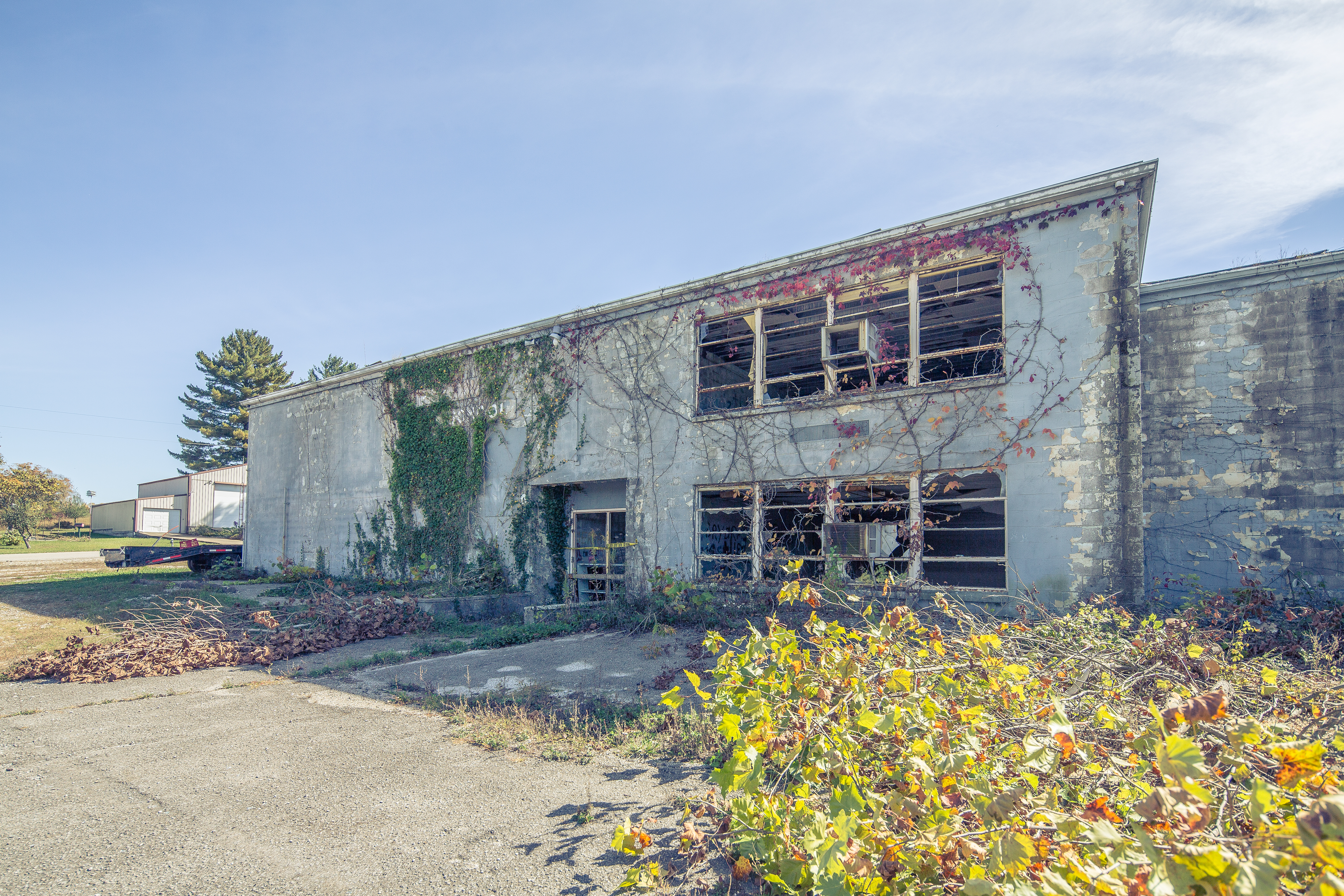

- Location within Indiana Location within the United States
- Coordinates: 38°43′16″N 86°40′15″W
- Country: United States
- State: Indiana
- County: Lawrence
- Township: Spice Valley
- Elevation: 564 ft (172 m)
- Time zone: UTC-5 (Eastern (EST))
  - Summer (DST): UTC-4 (EDT)
- ZIP code: 47437
- Area code: 812
- GNIS feature ID: 2830451

Huron is a census-designated place in Spice Valley Township, Lawrence County, in the U.S. state of Indiana.

== History ==
Huron was platted in 1859. It was named after Huron, Ohio. On September 16, 1861, during the American Civil War, a train carrying 600 Illinois Union soldiers crashed into a creek near Huron, killing or injuring 100-150 soldiers.

== Demographics ==
The United States Census Bureau delineated Huron as a census designated place in the 2022 American Community Survey.
