= Otis Park and Golf Course =

- U.S. National Register of Historic Places
- U.S. Historic district
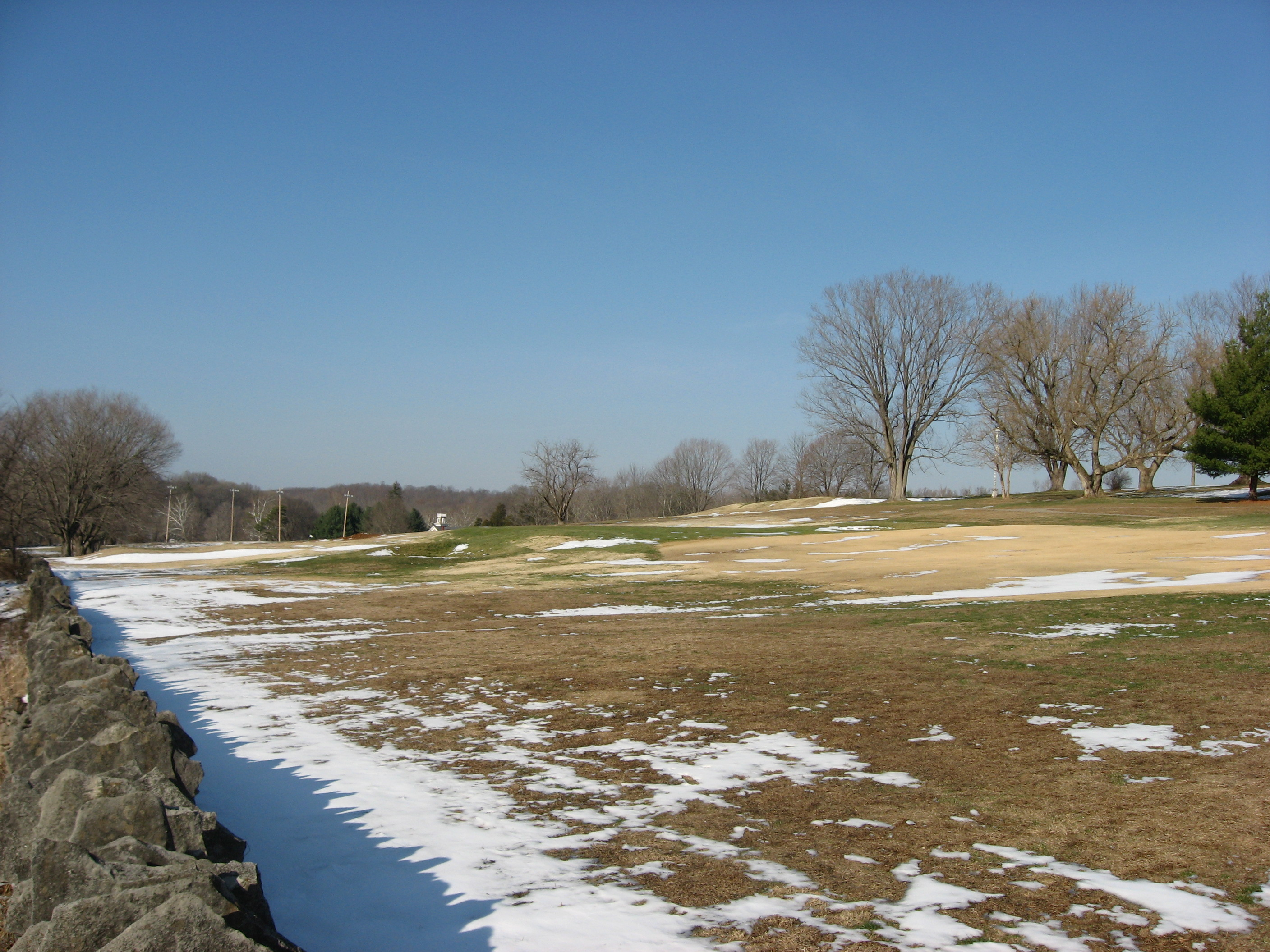
- Otis Park Golf Club, fairway and William A. Ragsdale House, December 2010

- Location within Indiana Location within the United States
- Location: Tunnelton Rd., Bedford, Indiana
- Coordinates: 38°51′31″N 86°27′17″W
- Area: 145 acres (59 ha)
- Built: 1923
- Architect: Pearson, Henry; Cezar, Joe
- Architectural style: Classical Revival, Bungalow/craftsman, WPA
- NRHP reference No.: 02001560
- Added to NRHP: December 20, 2002

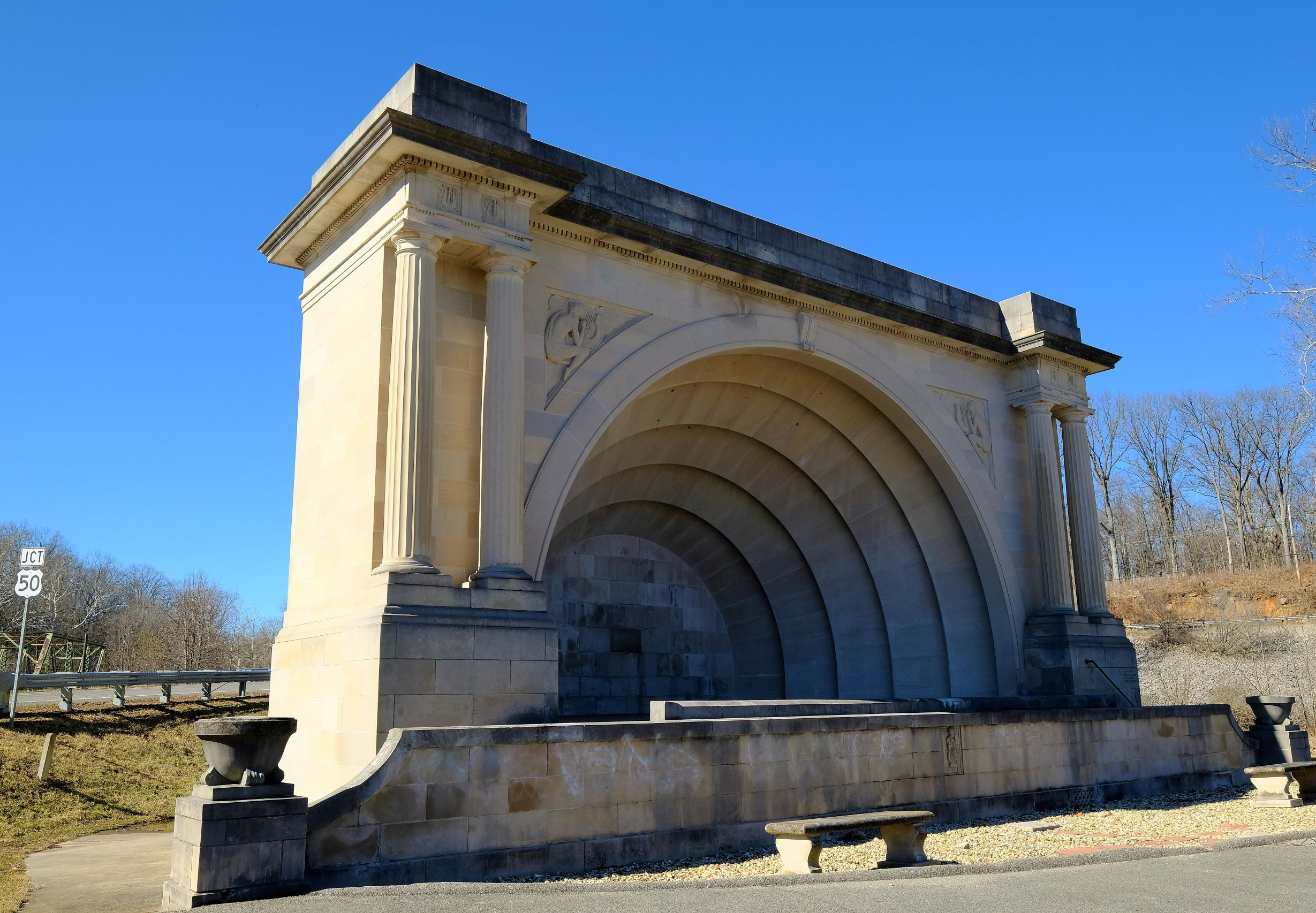
Otis Park Band Shell (1939)

Otis Park and Golf Course is a historic park, golf course, and national historic district located at Bedford, Indiana. The district encompasses five contributing buildings, four contributing sites, eights contributing structures, and five contributing objects in a park originally established in 1923 and donated to city of Bedford in 1935. It was largely developed as a Works Progress Administration project between 1937 and 1941, and includes examples of Classical Revival and Bungalow / American Craftsman style architecture. Notable contributing resources include the band shell (1939), rock garden, bathhouse, clubhouse, four picnic shelters (1938), shelter house, and gazebo.

It was listed in the National Register of Historic Places in 2002.
