= Becky Muncy =

- Origin: Bedford, Indiana, U.S.
- Genres: Children's music
- Occupation(s): Musician, teacher
- Website: www.beckymuncy.com

Becky Muncy is a musician and an elementary school music teacher in Bedford, Indiana. In addition to teaching music at school, she teaches character education through music.

Muncy has created a character education CD for children titled Blueprints for Life. The CD was produced by Matt Wilder in Nashville, Tennessee. Muncy won a 2005 Children's Music Web Award for her Blueprints CD. Muncy also is a coordinator for Nashville Songwriters Association International NSAI() and has been so for 7 years.

Muncy is a songwriter and has recorded many demo CDs in the past.
