= Gary Barrett =

American ecologist (1942–2022)

Gary Barrett (January 3, 1940 – April 10, 2022) was an American ecologist.

Barrett held the Eugene P. Odum chair of Odum School of Ecology at University of Georgia; previously he taught at Miami University and Drake University. He was the Deputy Director for Research for the Institute of Environmental Sciences from 1977 to 1981, and was the recipient of the US Regional Association of the International Association for Landscape Ecology's Distinguished Landscape Ecologist Award in 2001.

He received his bachelor's degree cum laude from Oakland City University, his master's from Marquette University, and his doctorate from the University of Georgia. He was one of the founders of Miami University's Institute of Environmental Sciences (IES) in 1969. IES has conferred Master of Environmental Science degrees for over 50 years.
