= Indiana Limestone Company Building =

- U.S. National Register of Historic Places
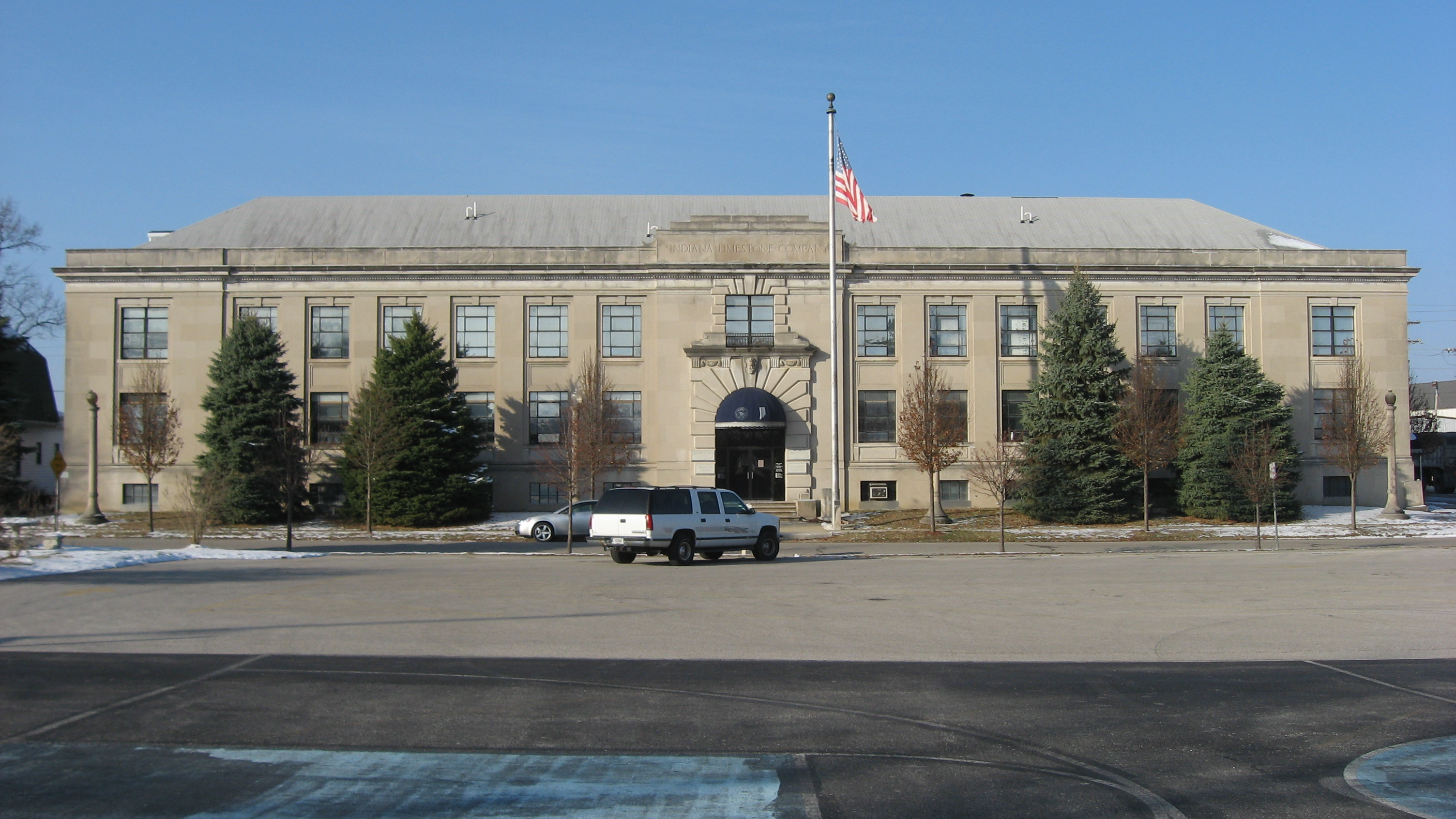
- Indiana Limestone Company Building, December 2010

- Location within Indiana Location within the United States
- Location: 405 I St., Bedford, Indiana
- Coordinates: 38°52′31″N 86°29′0″W
- Area: less than one acre
- Built: 1927
- Architect: Granger and Bollenbacher; Colvin, Leslie
- Architectural style: Classical Revival
- NRHP reference No.: 93001412
- Added to NRHP: December 21, 1993

Indiana Limestone Company Building, also known as Bedford College Center Building, is a historic building located at Bedford, Indiana. It was built in 1927, and is a two-story, L-shaped, Classical Revival style limestone building on a raised basement. It was built to house the offices and showroom of the Indiana Limestone Company, supplier of Indiana Limestone, founded in 1926. The building presently houses the Bedford branch of Oakland City University.

It was listed in the National Register of Historic Places in 1993.
