= C.S. Norton Mansion =

Historic house in Indiana, United States

- C.S. Norton Mansion (Limestone Castle)
- U.S. National Register of Historic Places
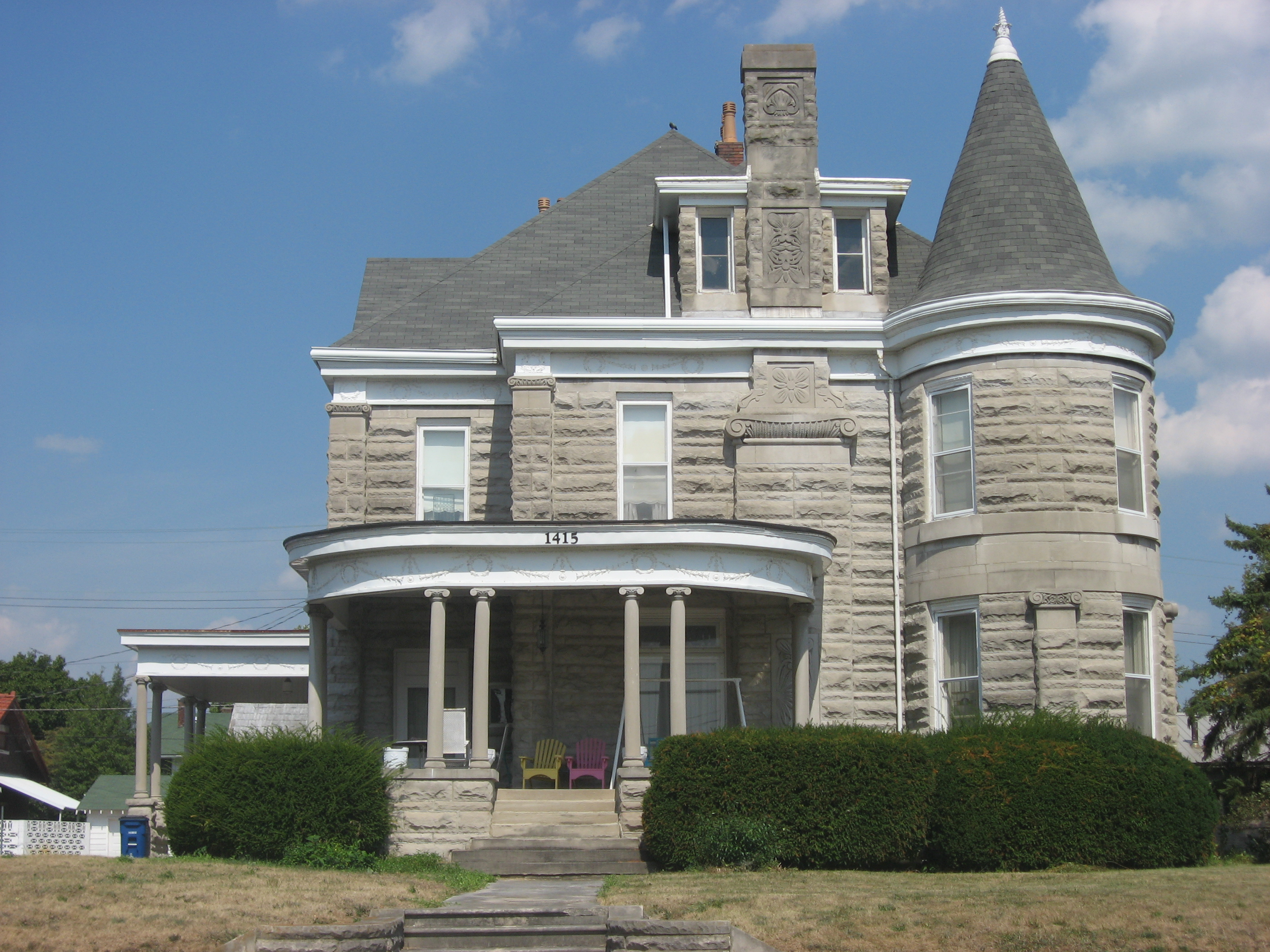
- C.S. Norton Mansion, September 2010

- Location within Indiana Location within the United States
- Location: 1415 15th St., Bedford, Indiana
- Coordinates: 38°51′45″N 86°29′28″W
- Area: 1 acre (0.40 ha)
- Built: 1897
- NRHP reference No.: 76000026
- Added to NRHP: June 22, 1976

C.S. Norton Mansion is a historic home located at Bedford, Indiana. It was built in 1897, and is a 2 1/2-story, "royal blue" limestone dwelling. A three-room addition was built in 1925–1926. It has dual front entrances and a parapet surrounding the roof. It is cubicle in form with a hipped roof with gable dormers. The house features a cylindrical tower topped by a conical roof, a one-story entrance portico with Ionic order columns, and a porte cochere. The building housed school administration offices after 1928.

It was listed in the National Register of Historic Places in 1976.

Also known as the Limestone Castle, the limestone came from Mr. Norton's quarry. He enjoyed a large amount of success due to the limestone in his quarry having a light blue hue to it. The school district used the home for offices and storage for many years until a private owner purchased it in the 1970s. The last known family to live in the house was the Groff family from 1982 to 1984. They were Tom and Barbara with their three sons Daniel, James and Timothy who were in grade school at the time. Tom built the surrounding wood fence in the backyard where there was none. It still stands today. The red building at the rear of the property was living quarters for the builders. It has a wood-burning stove inside and is a two-story building with stairs.

Over the last 40+ years, not much has changed about the property. One large evergreen tree located at the beginning of the driveway was taken down. The only visible improvements or updating that has been done in that time is the carpet (unknown date) and the tar shingle roof in 1983. The front limestone facade at the sidewalk has been repaired to keep it from toppling over.

The house has a full-size attic with interior stairs for access. The basement covers about 3/4 of the house. The home is heated by a boiler in the basement that circulates the hot water through radiators throughout the home. Interior ceilings are approximately twelve to fourteen feet high. Four of the five bedrooms upstairs each have a fireplace. The master bedroom enjoys the quaint area of the tower. The bedroom over the side entrance affords views all the way to main highway. The house has two side-by-side full bathrooms upstairs off the hallway, a full bathroom in the master and a half bath placed in an odd position between the room at the side entrance and the rear staircase. There is still an intercom system to all of the upstairs bedroom from the kitchen. A convenient laundry chute from the second story to the laundry/pantry room was a modern touch at the time. This room is behind the kitchen and accessible to the dining room. Beautiful stained glass windows let in the western light to the main staircase. Three other staircases allow access from the basement to the attic. A wood-burning fireplace warms the rear room. The property is located across the street from Bedford Junior High School.
