= Bryantsville, Indiana =

- Unincorporated community
- Location within Indiana Location within the United States
- Coordinates: 38°46′07″N 86°34′23″W
- Country: United States
- State: Indiana
- County: Lawrence
- Township: Spice Valley
- Elevation: 604 ft (184 m)
- ZIP code: 47446
- FIPS code: 18-08740
- GNIS feature ID: 450725

Bryantsville is an unincorporated community in Spice Valley Township, Lawrence County, Indiana.

== History ==
Bryantsville was platted in 1835, It was originally platted under the name Paris. It was renamed in honor of Robert Bryant, a pioneer settler. A post office was established at Bryantsville in 1846, and remained in operation until it was discontinued in 1905.
