= Spice Valley Township, Lawrence County, Indiana =

Spice Valley Township
- Township
- Location in Lawrence County
- Coordinates: 38°45′11″N 86°37′29″W
- Country: United States
- State: Indiana
- County: Lawrence

Government
  - Type: Indiana township
  - Trustee: Michelle Cornett

Area
  - Total: 71.25 sq mi (184.5 km^{2})
  - Land: 70.34 sq mi (182.2 km^{2})
  - Water: 0.91 sq mi (2.4 km^{2}) 1.28%
- Elevation: 650 ft (198 m)

Population (2020)
  - Total: 2,193
  - Density: 34.4/sq mi (13.3/km^{2})
- ZIP codes: 47421, 47446, 47452, 47470
- GNIS feature ID: 0453863

Spice Valley Township is one of nine townships in Lawrence County, Indiana, United States. As of the 2010 census, its population was 2,423 and it contained 1,137 housing units.

== History ==
The Williams Bridge was listed in the National Register of Historic Places in 1981.

== Geography ==
According to the 2010 census, the township has a total area of 71.25 square miles (184.5 km^{2}), of which 70.34 square miles (182.2 km^{2}) (or 98.72%) is land and 0.91 square miles (2.4 km^{2}) (or 1.28%) is water.

=== Unincorporated towns ===
- Bryantsville at 38.768662°N 86.57305°W
- Georgia at 38.710052°N 86.572215°W
- Huron at 38.722273°N 86.670552°W
- Williams at 38.804495°N 86.647219°W

(This list is based on USGS data and may include former settlements.)

=== Cemeteries ===
The township contains these nine cemeteries: Brunner, Bryantsville, Burton, Connerley Switch, Cox, Georgia, Grodey, Huron and Tincher.

=== Major highways ===
- U.S. Route 50
- State Road 60

=== Lakes ===
- Half Moon Lake

== Education ==
- Mitchell Community Schools
- North Lawrence Community Schools

Spice Valley Township residents may obtain a free library card from the Mitchell Community Public Library in Mitchell.

== Political districts ==
- Indiana's 4th congressional district
- State House District 62
- State Senate District 44
