= Zahn Historic District =

Historic district in Indiana, United States

- U.S. National Register of Historic Places
- U.S. Historic district
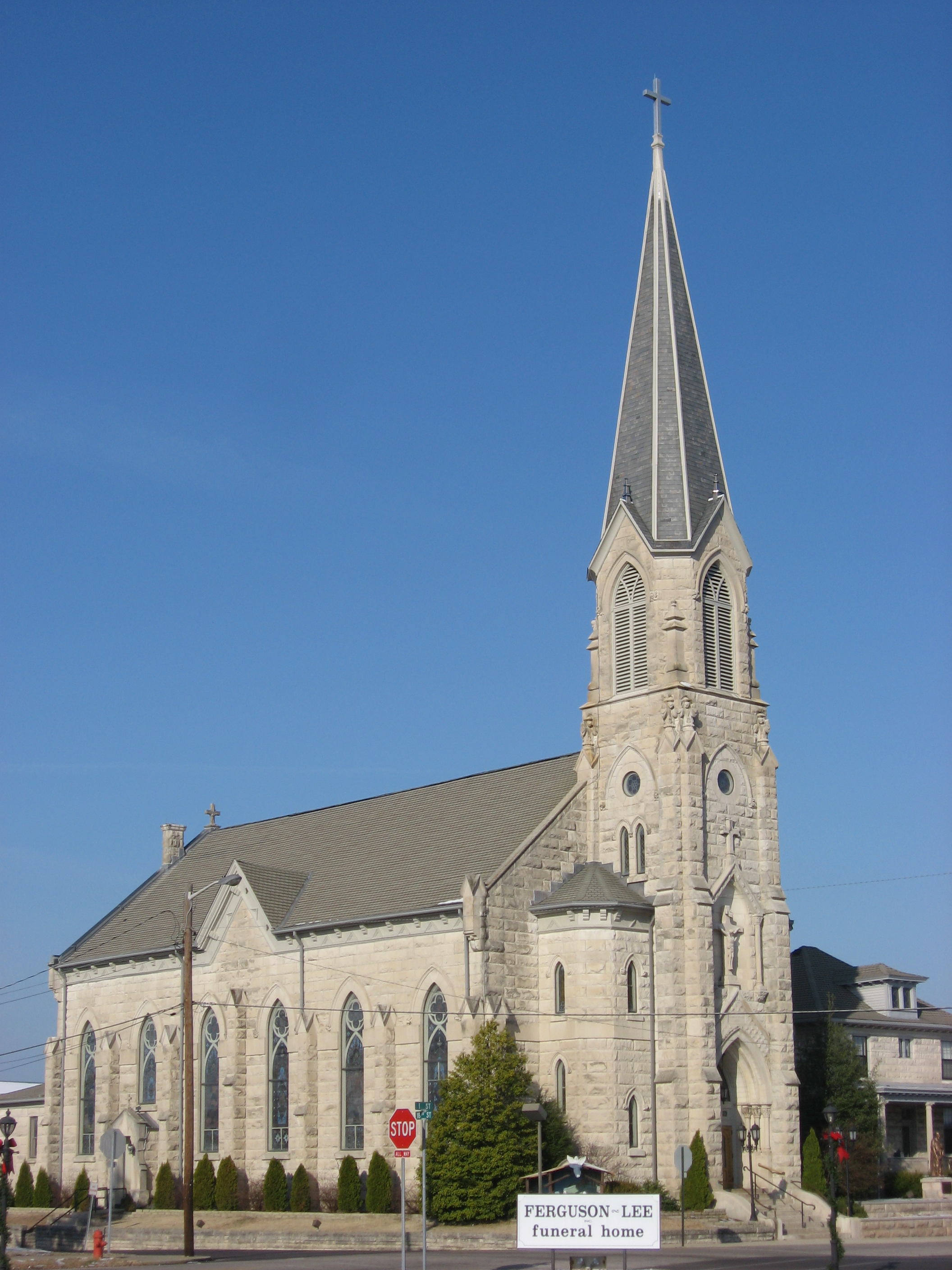
- St. Vincent de Paul Church, December 2010

- Location within Indiana Location within the United States
- Location: Roughly bounded by 17th, 20th, J., and H Sts., Bedford, Indiana
- Coordinates: 38°51′29″N 86°28′57″W
- Area: 11.6 acres (4.7 ha)
- Architect: Bogeman, M.H.; Zahn, John, Sr.
- Architectural style: Late Gothic Revival, Second Empire, Queen Anne
- NRHP reference No.: 98001100
- Added to NRHP: August 28, 1998

Zahn Historic District is a national historic district located at Bedford, Indiana. The district encompasses 66 contributing buildings, one contributing structure, and one contributing object in a predominantly residential section of Bedford. It developed between about 1847 and 1947, and includes examples of Late Gothic Revival, Second Empire, and Queen Anne style architecture. Notable buildings include the St. Vincent DePaul Church (1893), Gaussin House (1875), John Zahn House (c. 1865), George Gratzer House (c. 1885), Asa Bridwell House (c. 1925), and Horace Casada House (c. 1925).

It was listed in the National Register of Historic Places in 1998.
