= Madden School =

Historic building in Bedford, Indiana, USA

- U.S. National Register of Historic Places
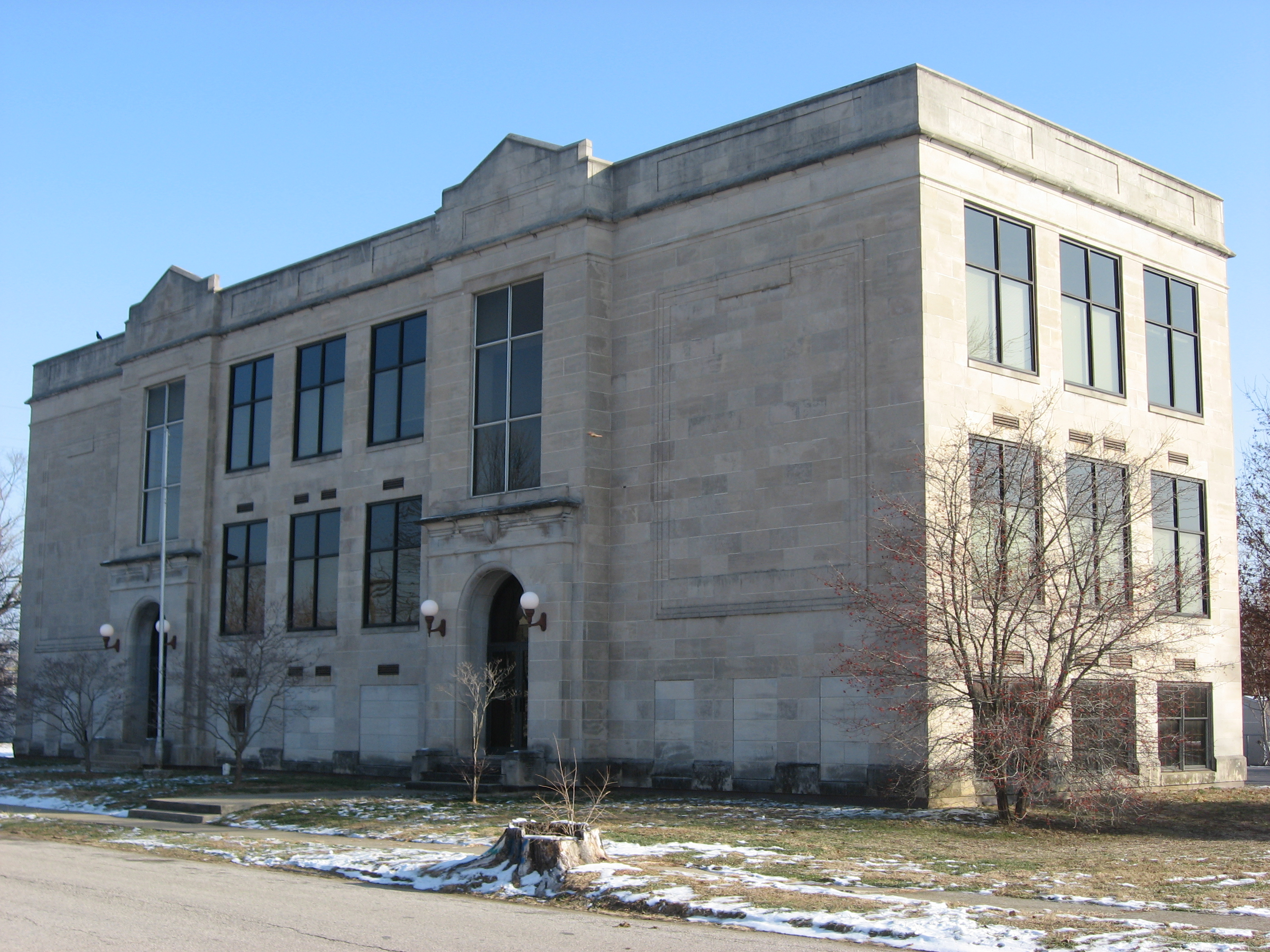
- Madden School, December 2010

- Location within Indiana Location within the United States
- Location: 620 H St., Bedford, Indiana
- Coordinates: 38°52′21″N 86°28′11″W
- Area: 1.4 acres (0.57 ha)
- Built: 1923, 1925-1926
- Architectural style: Classical Revival
- NRHP reference No.: 00000673
- Added to NRHP: June 15, 2000

Madden School, also known as North Lawrence Community Schools Administration Building, is a historic school building located at Bedford, Indiana. It was built in 1923, and is a two-story, rectangular, Classical Revival style limestone and brick building on a raised basement. A three-room addition was built in 1925–1926. It has dual front entrances and a parapet surrounding the roof. The building housed a school until 1976, after which it was used as an administration center.

It was listed in the National Register of Historic Places in 2000.
