= Bedford Courthouse Square Historic District =

Historic district in Indiana, United States

- U.S. National Register of Historic Places
- U.S. Historic district
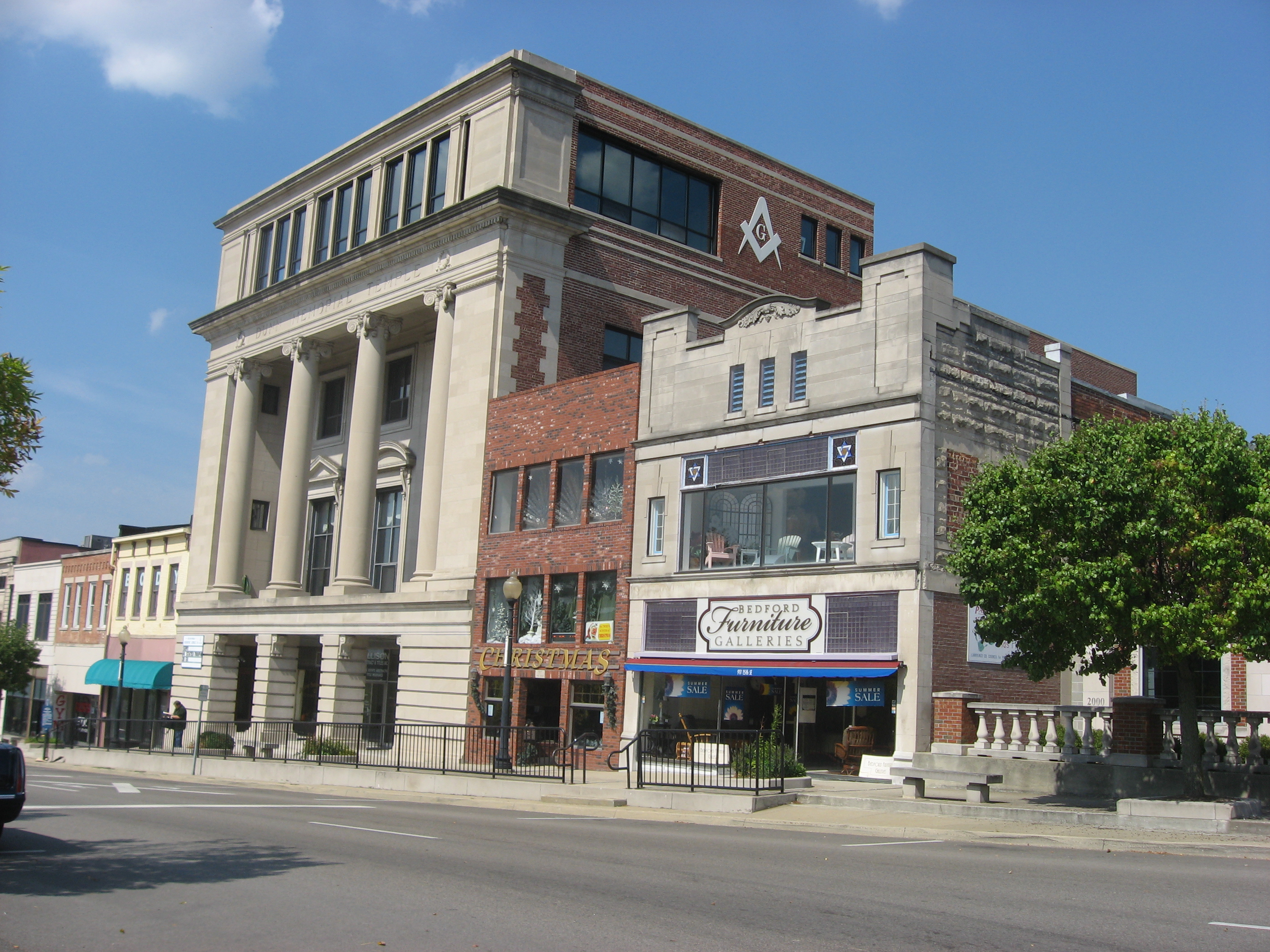
- Downtown Bedford, Indiana, September 2010

- Location within Indiana Location within the United States
- Location: Roughly bounded by L, 14th, 17th and H Sts., Bedford, Indiana
- Coordinates: 38°51′42″N 86°29′01″W
- Area: 23.3 acres (9.4 ha)
- Architect: Multiple
- Architectural style: Classical Revival, Italianate
- NRHP reference No.: 95000704
- Added to NRHP: June 8, 1995

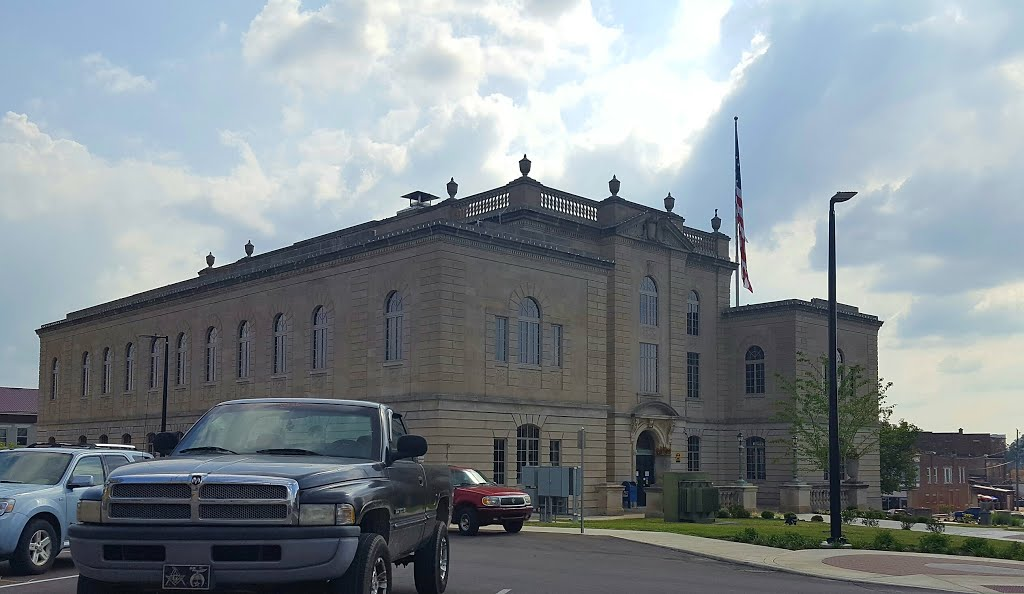
Lawrence County Courthouse - Bedford, IN

Bedford Courthouse Square Historic District is a national historic district located at Bedford, Indiana. The district encompasses 64 contributing buildings, one contributing site, and one contributing object in the central business district of Bedford. It developed between about 1850 and 1945, and includes examples of Italianate, Romanesque Revival, and Neoclassical style architecture. Notable contributing resources include the Soldiers', Sailors' and Pioneers Monument (1923); Michael A. Malott House (c. 1850); Moses Fell Building (c. 1895); Stone City Bank Building (c. 1895); Dunn Memorial Masonic Temple (1918); Lawrence County Courthouse (1930); Bedford Fire Department Building (c. 1924); Citizens' Bank Building (1926); Elks Club (1916); Hamer Building (c. 1910); and Bedford Municipal Garage (1937).

It was listed in the National Register of Historic Places in 1995.
