= William A. Ragsdale House =

Historic house in Indiana, United States

- U.S. National Register of Historic Places
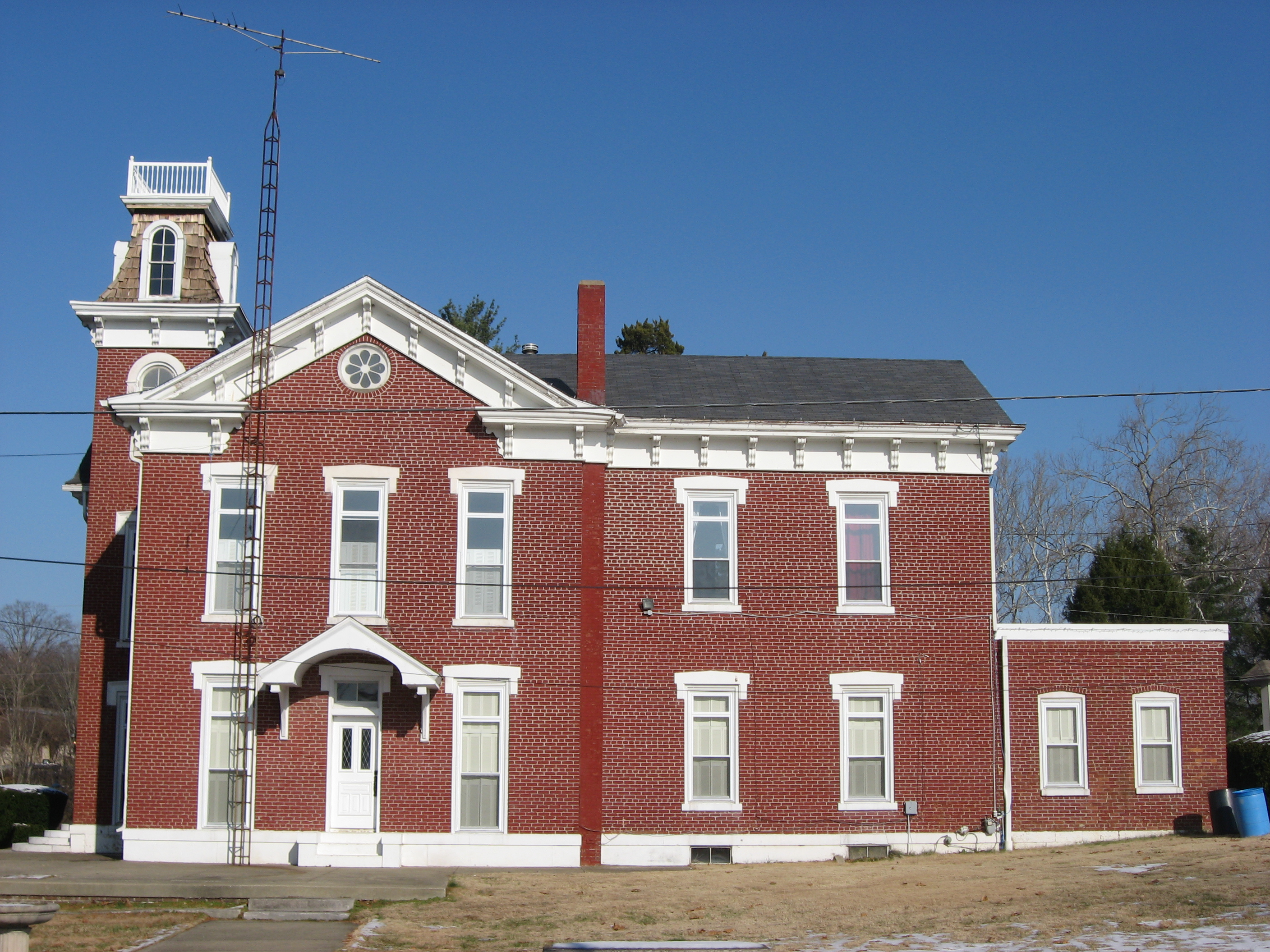
- William A. Ragsdale House, December 2010

- Location within Indiana Location within the United States
- Location: 607 Tunnelton Rd., Bedford, Indiana
- Coordinates: 38°51′32″N 86°27′36″W
- Area: less than one acre
- Built: 1865
- Architect: Pearson, Matthew A.; Cochran, Jimmy
- Architectural style: Italianate, Second Empire
- NRHP reference No.: 02001565
- Added to NRHP: December 20, 2002

William A. Ragsdale House, also known as Pine Hall, is a historic home located at Bedford, Indiana. It was built in 1865, and is a two-story, Italianate / Second Empire style brick dwelling on a limestone block foundation. It features a 3 1/2-story projecting entry tower with a mansard roof.

It was listed in the National Register of Historic Places in 2002.
