= Bedford, Indiana =

- City
- City of Bedford
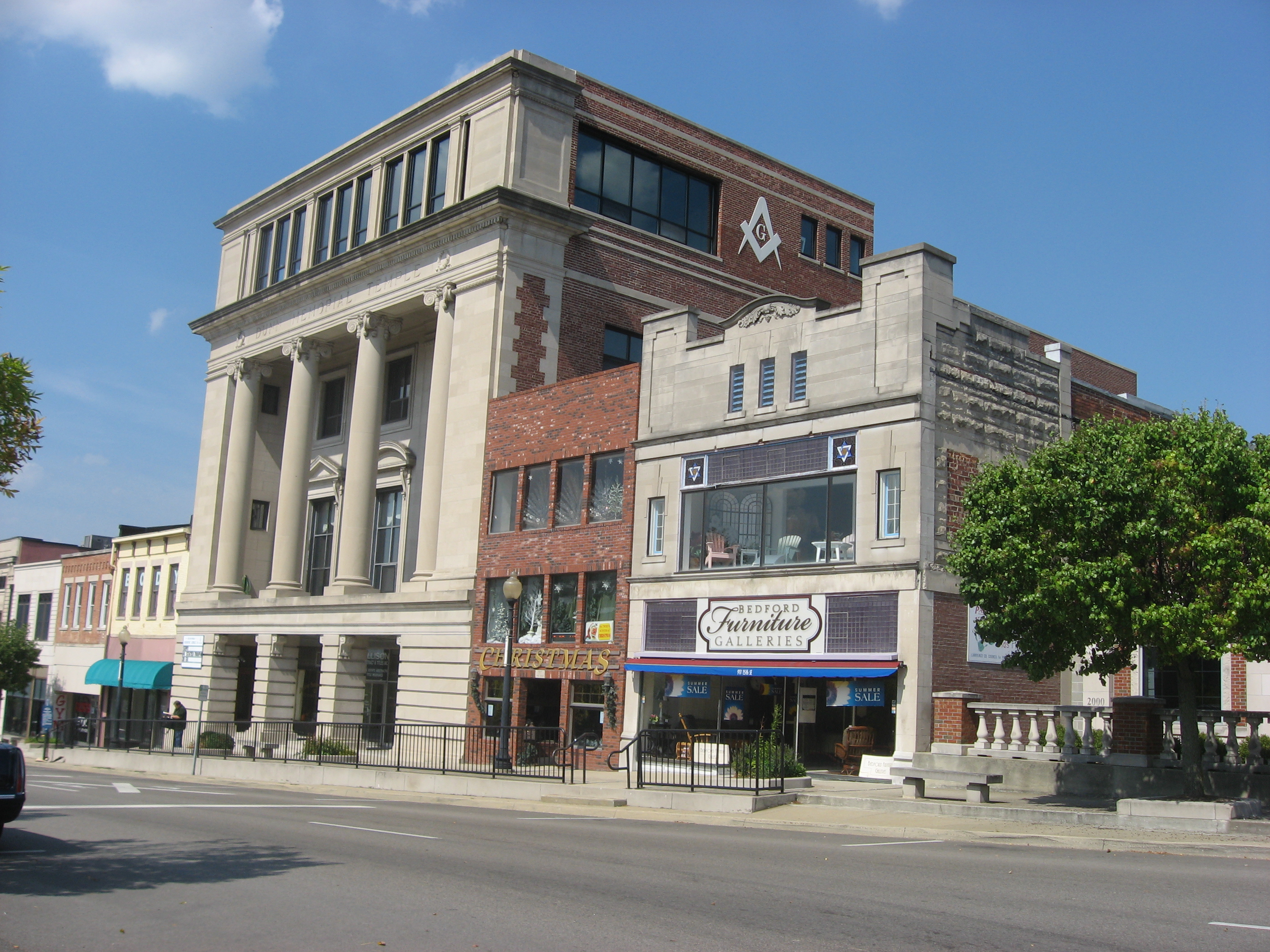

- Seal Logo
- Nickname: Limestone Capital of the World
- Motto: "United In Hometown Values And Committed To Growth For Future Generations"
- Location of Bedford in Lawrence County, Indiana.

- Location in Indiana Bedford (the United States) Bedford (North America)
- Coordinates: 38°51′46″N 86°29′32″W
- Country: United States
- State: Indiana
- County: Lawrence
- Township: Shawswick
- Founded: 1825
- Incorporated (town): 1864
- Incorporated (city): 1889

Government
  - Type: Mayor-Council
  - Mayor: Sam Craig (R)

Area
  - Total: 12.21 sq mi (31.62 km^{2})
  - Land: 12.21 sq mi (31.62 km^{2})
  - Water: 0 sq mi (0.00 km^{2})
- Elevation: 699 ft (213 m)

Population (2020)
  - Total: 13,792
  - Density: 1,129.6/sq mi (436.13/km^{2})
- Time zone: UTC−5 (Eastern)
  - Summer (DST): UTC−4 (Eastern)
- ZIP code: 47421
- Area codes: 812 and 930
- FIPS code: 18-04114
- GNIS feature ID: 2394104
- Website: bedford.in.gov

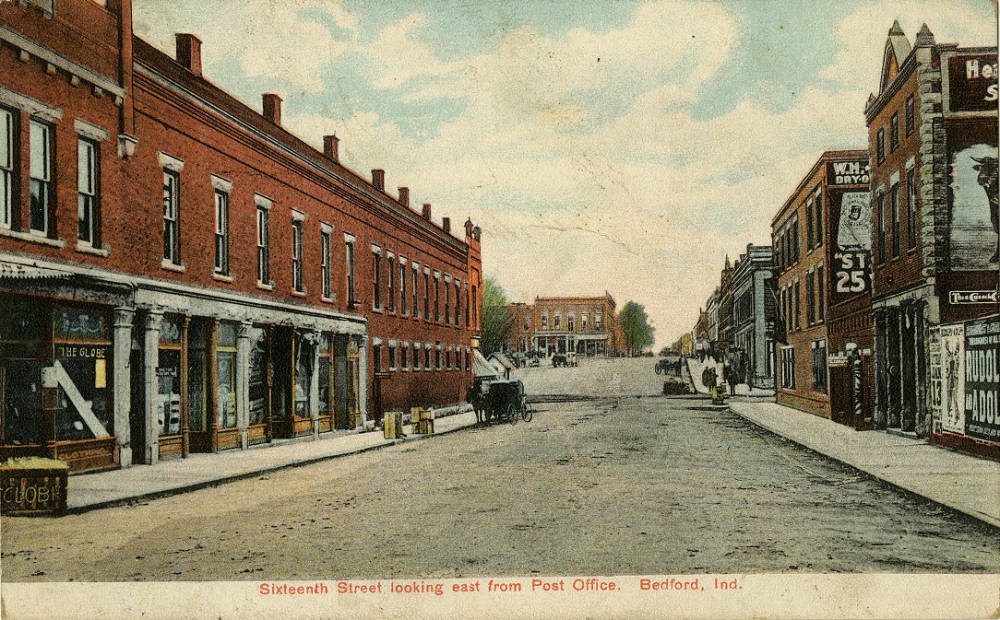
Bedford, Indiana postcard. 1909

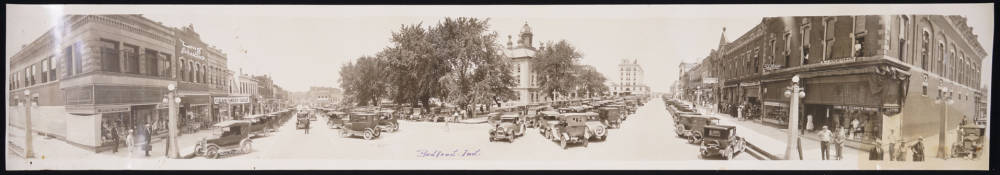
A panoramic photograph of Bedford, Indiana's downtown, specifically the Courthouse Square in Lawrence County.

Bedford is a city in Shawswick Township and the county seat of Lawrence County, Indiana, United States. In the 2020 census, the population was 13,792. That is up from 13,413 in 2010. Bedford is the principal city of the Bedford, IN Micropolitan Statistical Area, which comprises all of Lawrence County.

== History ==
Bedford was laid out as a town and the county seat of Lawrence County, Indiana, United States in 1825. The original county seat was in Palestine, four miles to the south, but was moved, at the urging of the legislature, to a new location as the original location near the White River was deemed unhealthy because of malaria spread by mosquitoes. The new site was named Bedford at the suggestion of a prominent local businessman, Joseph Rawlins, who had relocated to the area from Bedford County, Tennessee. It incorporated as a town in 1864 and received its city charter in 1889. Bedford was a stop on the Underground Railroad.

== Geography ==
According to the 2010 census, Bedford has a total area of 12.16 square miles (31.49 km^{2}), all land. The city is known as the "Limestone Capital of the World" because of its large limestone quarries that are around the area. Some of the limestone was used to make the Empire State Building and The Pentagon. Bedford is situated about 70 miles south of Indianapolis and 18 miles south of Bloomington.

=== Climate ===
The climate in this area is characterized by hot, humid summers and generally cool to cold winters. According to the Köppen Climate Classification system, Bedford has a humid subtropical climate, abbreviated "Cfa" on climate maps. On May 25, 2011, an EF3 tornado touched down near Bedford, closing U.S. Route 50 temporarily.

Climate data for Bedford, Indiana
Month	Jan	Feb	Mar	Apr	May	Jun	Jul	Aug	Sep	Oct	Nov	Dec	Year
Record high °F (°C)	75 (24)	77 (25)	87 (31)	92 (33)	103 (39)	108 (42)	111 (44)	109 (43)	105 (41)	96 (36)	91 (33)	75 (24)	111 (44)
Mean daily maximum °F (°C)	39.2 (4.0)	43.4 (6.3)	53.8 (12.1)	65.8 (18.8)	75.3 (24.1)	83.7 (28.7)	87.3 (30.7)	86.1 (30.1)	80 (27)	68.4 (20.2)	54.3 (12.4)	42.7 (5.9)	65 (18)
Mean daily minimum °F (°C)	20.7 (−6.3)	23.2 (−4.9)	31.5 (−0.3)	41.6 (5.3)	51 (11)	60.2 (15.7)	63.8 (17.7)	62 (17)	54.9 (12.7)	42.8 (6.0)	33.2 (0.7)	24.6 (−4.1)	42.5 (5.8)
Record low °F (°C)	−29 (−34)	−18 (−28)	−6 (−21)	13 (−11)	27 (−3)	37 (3)	45 (7)	41 (5)	27 (−3)	16 (−9)	−3 (−19)	−23 (−31)	−29 (−34)
Average precipitation inches (mm)	2.75 (70)	2.7 (69)	3.77 (96)	4.47 (114)	5.04 (128)	4.11 (104)	4.53 (115)	4.2 (110)	3.1 (79)	3.24 (82)	3.94 (100)	3.3 (84)	45.15 (1,147)
Average snowfall inches (cm)	6.5 (17)	5.1 (13)	2.9 (7.4)	0.2 (0.51)	0 (0)	0 (0)	0 (0)	0 (0)	0 (0)	0 (0)	0.2 (0.51)	3.5 (8.9)	19.1 (49)

== Demographics ==
Historical population
Census	Pop.	Note	%±
1850	962		—
1880	2,198		—
1890	3,351		52.5%
1900	6,115		82.5%
1910	8,716		42.5%
1920	9,076		4.1%
1930	13,208		45.5%
1940	12,514		−5.3%
1950	12,562		0.4%
1960	13,024		3.7%
1970	13,087		0.5%
1980	14,410		10.1%
1990	13,817		−4.1%
2000	13,768		−0.4%
2010	13,413		−2.6%
2020	13,792		2.8%
Source: US Census Bureau

=== 2020 census ===
As of the 2020 census, Bedford had a population of 13,792. The median age was 41.9 years. 21.1% of residents were under the age of 18 and 22.0% of residents were 65 years of age or older. For every 100 females there were 92.4 males, and for every 100 females age 18 and over there were 88.7 males age 18 and over.

93.1% of residents lived in urban areas, while 6.9% lived in rural areas.

There were 5,964 households in Bedford, of which 26.1% had children under the age of 18 living in them. Of all households, 37.8% were married-couple households, 19.7% were households with a male householder and no spouse or partner present, and 34.4% were households with a female householder and no spouse or partner present. About 36.6% of all households were made up of individuals and 17.4% had someone living alone who was 65 years of age or older.

There were 6,610 housing units, of which 9.8% were vacant. The homeowner vacancy rate was 2.6% and the rental vacancy rate was 7.5%.

Racial composition as of the 2020 census
Race	Number	Percent
White	12,837	93.1%
Black or African American	110	0.8%
American Indian and Alaska Native	53	0.4%
Asian	75	0.5%
Native Hawaiian and Other Pacific Islander	5	0.0%
Some other race	102	0.7%
Two or more races	610	4.4%
Hispanic or Latino (of any race)	332	2.4%

=== 2010 census ===
As of the 2010 census, there were 13,413 people, 5,801 households, and 3,426 families living in the city. The population density was 1,103.0 inhabitants per square mile (425.9/km^{2}). There were 6,553 housing units at an average density of 538.9 per square mile (208.1/km^{2}). The racial makeup of the city was 96.2% White, 0.8% African American, 0.3% Native American, 0.9% Asian, 0.5% from other races, and 1.3% from two or more races. Hispanic or Latino of any race were 1.8% of the population.

There were 5,801 households, of which 27.7% had children under the age of 18 living with them, 41.5% were married couples living together, 13.3% had a female householder with no husband present, 4.3% had a male householder with no wife present, and 40.9% were non-families. 36.3% of all households were made up of individuals, and 16.8% had someone living alone who was 65 years of age or older. The average household size was 2.22 and the average family size was 2.87.

The median age in the city was 41.5 years. 22.3% of residents were under the age of 18; 8.1% were between the ages of 18 and 24; 23.5% were from 25 to 44; 26.2% were from 45 to 64; and 20.1% were 65 years of age or older. The gender makeup of the city was 47.3% male and 52.7% female.

=== 2000 census ===
As of the 2000 census, there were 13,768 people, 6,054 households, and 3,644 families living in the city. The population density was 1,157.1 inhabitants per square mile (446.8/km^{2}). There were 6,618 housing units at an average density of 556.2 per square mile (214.8/km^{2}). The racial makeup of the city was 98.87% White, 0.79% African American, 0.28% Native American, 0.48% Asian, 0.01% Pacific Islander, 0.70% from other races, and 0.88% from two or more races. Hispanic or Latino of any race were 1.26% of the population.

There were 6,054 households, out of which 25.0% had children under the age of 18 living with them, 46.5% were married couples living together, 10.3% had a female householder with no husband present, and 39.8% were non-families. 35.5% of all households were made up of individuals, and 18.3% had someone living alone who was 65 years of age or older. The average household size was 2.18 and the average family size was 2.81.

In the city, the population was spread out, with 21.2% under the age of 18, 8.0% from 18 to 24, 25.7% from 25 to 44, 23.2% from 45 to 64, and 21.9% who were 65 years of age or older. The median age was 41 years. For every 100 females, there were 86.9 males. For every 100 females age 18 and over, there were 81.8 males.

The median income for a household in the city was $31,022, and the median income for a family was $39,462. Males had a median income of $31,956 versus $22,578 for females. The per capita income for the city was $17,649. About 7.4% of families and 11.5% of the population were below the poverty line, including 12.8% of those under age 18 and 8.6% of those age 65 or over.

== Government ==
Bedford is governed by a mayor and city council. The city council is known as the Common Council, which consists of seven members. Five of the members are elected from individual districts while two are elected at-large. The mayor and clerk-treasurer are elected in a citywide vote.

== Sports teams and history ==
- Bedford Stonecutters (Bedford High School) 1890–1974
- Bedford North Lawrence Stars (High School) 1975–present

The Bedford North Lawrence High School is known for its basketball and golf programs. The boys' basketball team, captained by Damon Bailey, won a state title in 1990, Also Indiana All Star Cole Sinclair 2001, is the only other Indiana All Star from Bedford . The girls won state titles in 1983, 1991, 2013, 2014 and 2023. The boys' golf ranks third in Indiana in sectional championships with 20, and second in regionals with 7, having produced dozens of college players including PGA Tour Pro Craig Bowden. They have appeared in state finals many times and have numerous top five finishes. The BNL Boys Golf team holds the IHSAA record in all sports for most Finals trips without a championship with 27.

== Limestone ==
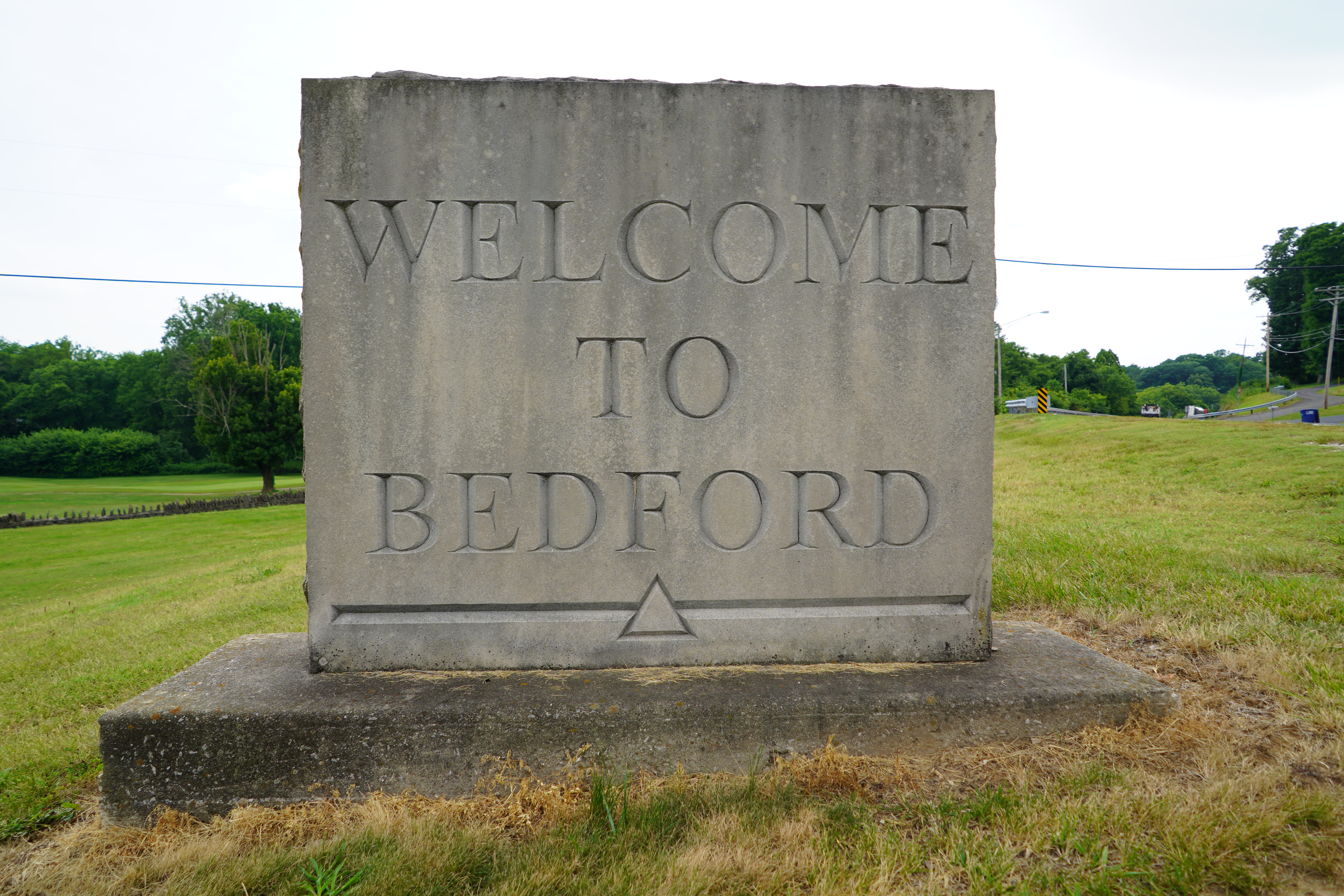
Bedford, Indiana Limestone Welcome Sign

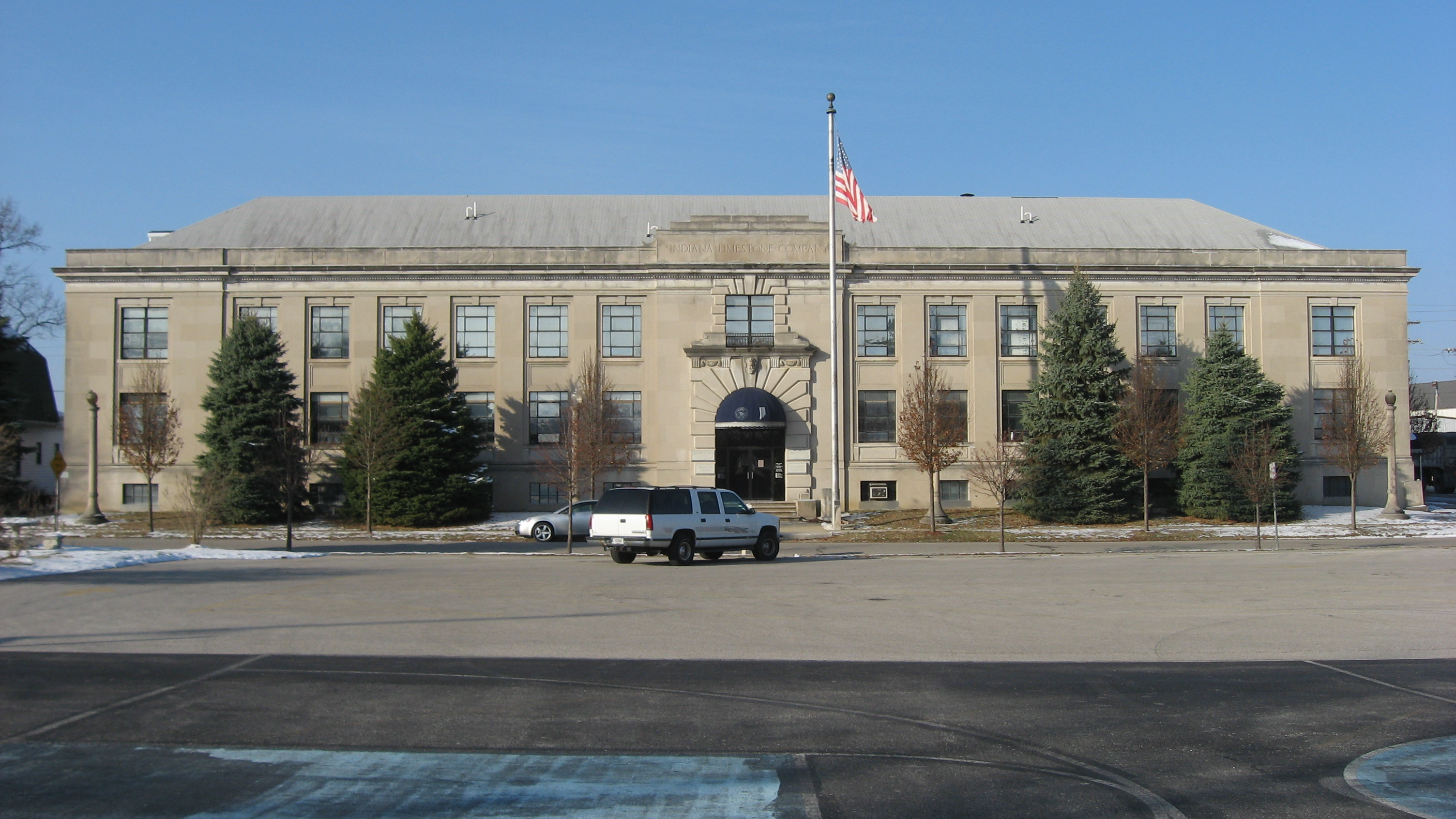
The historic Indiana Limestone Company Building, in Bedford.

Bedford is known as the limestone capital of the world, and is surrounded by limestone quarries.

A common name for the light gray Indiana limestone quarried in south central Indiana is "Bedford limestone", or "Bedford Oolitic limestone".

Much of the limestone used in the construction of various Washington, D.C., monuments was quarried in the Bedford area.

Limestone from a nearby quarry, called the "Empire Quarry", was used to build the Empire State Building in New York City.

Bedford area limestone was also used in the construction of the Saint Sava Serbian Orthodox Church located in Merrillville, Indiana.

Bedford received $500,000 in grants from the federal government to build a ten-story replica of the Great Pyramid of Giza out of local limestone; however, the work was never completed, despite a further $125,000 being allocated to finish it. An 800-foot limestone replica of the Great Wall of China was also built. Construction took place in 1981 and cost $200,000. Construction on the main pyramid ceased in 1982.

== Transportation ==
- No Interstate highways are nearby; the closest is Interstate 69, approximately 20 miles (35 km) west.
- U.S. Highway 50 goes through the heart of the city, connecting Bedford with Seymour to the east, and Vincennes to the west. Travel through Southern Indiana is often somewhat inconvenient, however, due to the hilly nature of the area.
- State Road 37 connects Bedford to Bloomington to the north and Mitchell to the south.
- Bedford was served by: Indiana Rail Road, via the former Monon Railroad line to Louisville, Kentucky, and on the Canadian Pacific Railway's former Milwaukee Road line to Terre Haute, Indiana with connections to Chicago. (The Canadian Pacific line was sold to the Indiana Rail Road, on July 1, 2006.)

== Education ==
The Bedford area has six elementary schools: Parkview Primary, Parkview Intermediate, Needmore Elementary, Lincoln Elementary, Dollens Elementary, and Shawswick Elementary. There are two middle schools that feed into Bedford North Lawrence High School: Bedford Middle School (BMS) and Oolitic Middle School (OMS). The two private schools in the city are St. Vincent Catholic School and Stone City Christian Academy. Lawrence County Independent School was founded in 2021.

The town has a lending library, the Bedford Public Library.

== Profiles of Bedford ==
Bedford, Indiana was featured as the subject of an hour-long PBS special entitled Our Town: Bedford, first aired in May 2006. It was produced by PBS affiliate WTIU in Bloomington, Indiana.

Bedford was recognized by the State of Indiana in 2013 by being named a Stellar Community. The Stellar Communities program is under the direction of Lieutenant Governor Sue Ellspermann and is a multi-agency partnership among the Indiana Housing and Community Development Authority, the Indiana Office of Community and Rural Affairs, the Indiana Department of Transportation and the State Revolving Fund. Only two Indiana communities are designated as such each year; Richmond was the other 2013 winner. The award brings $19 million in state, local and private funds to Bedford for planned improvements.

Bedford was also named the Indiana Chamber of Commerce's 2013 Community of the Year.

== Nearby points of interest ==
- Bluespring Caverns
- Nashville, Indiana
- Spring Mill State Park
- Avoca Park
- West Baden Springs Hotel
- The Bedford Courthouse Square Historic District, Indiana Limestone Company Building, Madden School, C.S. Norton Mansion, Otis Park and Golf Course, William A. Ragsdale House, and Zahn Historic District are listed in the National Register of Historic Places.

== Notable people ==
- Claude Akins, actor
- Marie Louise Andrews, writer and journalist
- Damon Bailey, basketball player
- Craig Bowden, PGA Tour golfer
- Kenneth Bowersox, astronaut
- Thomas J. Box, Medal of Honor recipient
- Donald Brashear, NHL player
- James Samuel Coleman, sociologist
- Eugene B. Crowe, U.S. representative from Indiana
- Bessie De Voie, vaudeville performer, dancer
- Claude Ferguson, environmentalist
- Carl Graf, artist
- A. B. Guthrie, Pulitzer Prize-winning writer
- Aishah Hasnie, Fox News reporter
- William E. Jenner, U.S. senator from Indiana
- Becky Muncy, musician, elementary school teacher
- Becky Skillman, lieutenant governor of Indiana
- Yank Terry, baseball player
- Charles Walker, astronaut
- Fred Wampler, PGA Tour golfer
- Bob Wicker, MLB pitcher
- William T. Wiley, artist
- Earl Wilson, U.S. representative from Indiana
