= Bono (disambiguation) =

Bono (born Paul David Hewson in 1960) is an Irish musician, activist, and lead singer for the band U2.

Bono may also refer to:

- Bono people, an Akan ethnic group of Ghana and Ivory Coast
- Bono dialect, spoken by them
- Bono state, an Akan state that existed from the 11th to the 18th centuries in what is now the Brong-Ahafo (Bono, Bono East and Ahafo) region of Ghana
- Bono Manso, capital of the Bono state

== People ==
=== As a surname ===
- Alain Bono (born 1983), Cameroonian football player
- Alex Bono (born 1994), an American football goalkeeper
- Chaz Bono (born Chastity Bono in 1969), activist, writer, actor, musician and son of Sonny Bono and Cher
- Edward de Bono (1933–2021), Maltese-British physician, writer, and consultant
- Emilio De Bono (1866–1944), Italian general
- José Bono (born 1950), Spanish politician, former president of Castile-La Mancha, minister of defence and President of the Congress of Deputies
- Ken Bono (born 1984), Philippine basketball player
- Laura Bono (born 1979), Italian singer
- Mary Bono Mack (born 1961), politician, second wife of Sonny Bono, and current wife of Connie Mack IV
- Matteo Bono (born 1983), Italian cyclist
- Outel Bono (1934–1973), Chadian medical doctor and politician, murdered in Paris
- Sonny Bono (1935–1998), American record producer, singer, actor, and politician
- Steve Bono (born 1962), former National Football League quarterback
- Vincenza Bono Parrino (born 1942), Italian politician

=== As a nickname ===
- Peter Bonnington (born 1975), Formula One engineer
- Yassine Bounou (born 1991), Moroccan football player

== Places ==
=== United States ===
- Bono, Arkansas, United States
- Bono, Ohio, United States
- Bono, Lawrence County, Indiana, United States
- Bono Township, Lawrence County, Indiana, United States
- Bono, Vermillion County, Indiana, United States
- Bono, Texas, United States

=== Elsewhere ===
- Bono region, a region within Ghana
- Bono East region, a region within Ghana
- Bono Manso, a former ancient trading town of the Brong-Ahafo region of Ghana
- Bono, Italy, Sardinia
- Bono, Morbihan, a commune in the Morbihan department in France
- Bono, Indonesia, a village in Tulung, Klaten Regency, Central Java, Indonesia
- Bono, Norway, a small country village in Norway built in the 16th century

== Other uses ==
- Bono Act, the Copyright Term Extension Act (United States), named for Sonny Bono
- Bonobono, a Japanese manga series by Mikio Igarashi
- Pro bono, a legal term
- Bone Oe, a village in Myanmar
