= 2014 Singapore Grand Prix =

Race 14 of 19 in the 2014 Formula One World Championship
← Previous race	Next race →
- Marina Bay Street Circuit

Race details
- Date: 21 September 2014
- Official name: 2014 Formula 1 Singapore Airlines Singapore Grand Prix
- Location: Marina Bay Street Circuit, Marina Bay, Singapore
- Course: Temporary street circuit
- Course length: 5.065 km (3.147 miles)
- Distance: 60 laps, 303.900 km (188.835 (Note: There is a 0.137 km (0.085 mi) offset between the start and finish lines.) miles)
- Scheduled distance: 61 laps, 308.965 km (191.982 miles)
- Weather: Clear. Air: 28 to 30 °C (82 to 86 °F) Track: 33 to 37 °C (91 to 99 °F).
- Attendance: 253,362 (Weekend) 84,454 (Race Day)

Pole position
Driver	(United Kingdom) Lewis Hamilton	Mercedes
- Time: 1.45.681

Fastest lap
Driver	(United Kingdom) Lewis Hamilton	Mercedes
- Time: 1:50.417 on lap 39

Podium
First	(United Kingdom) Lewis Hamilton	Mercedes
Second	(Germany) Sebastian Vettel	Red Bull Racing-Renault
Third	(Australia) Daniel Ricciardo	Red Bull Racing-Renault

The 2014 Singapore Grand Prix (formally the 2014 Formula 1 Singapore Airlines Singapore Grand Prix) was a Formula One motor race held on 21 September at the Marina Bay Street Circuit in Marina Bay, Singapore. It was the 14th round of the 2014 Formula One World Championship and the seventh Singapore Grand Prix held as part of the series. Mercedes driver Lewis Hamilton won the 60-lap race from pole position. The Red Bull pairing of Sebastian Vettel and Daniel Ricciardo were second and third. It was Hamilton's seventh victory of the season and the 29th of his career.

Nico Rosberg led the World Drivers' Championship while his team Mercedes led the World Constructors' Championship heading into the event. Hamilton won the pole position by posting the fastest lap time in qualifying and maintained the lead into the first corner. Rosberg, his teammate, had a wiring loom steering problem and began from the pit lane. Hamilton remained in the lead after the first round of pit stops before ceding it to Ricciardo for one lap in the second pit stop phase. In the final laps, Hamilton made his final pit stop to switch tyres and rejoined just ahead of Ricciardo. Vettel led for one lap until Hamilton passed him on lap 54 to win. There were four lead changes among three different drivers during the course of the race.

The result returned Hamilton to the lead of the World Drivers' Championship with 241 championship points, three ahead of teammate Rosberg who retired after 14 laps after his problem could not be rectified. Ricciardo maintained third place, with Fernando Alonso and Vettel passing the non-scoring Valtteri Bottas to move into fourth and fifth. Mercedes further extended their lead in the Constructors' Championship to 182 championship points over Red Bull in second. Williams and Ferrari maintained third and fourth and Force India overtook McLaren for fifth with five races left in the season.

== Background ==
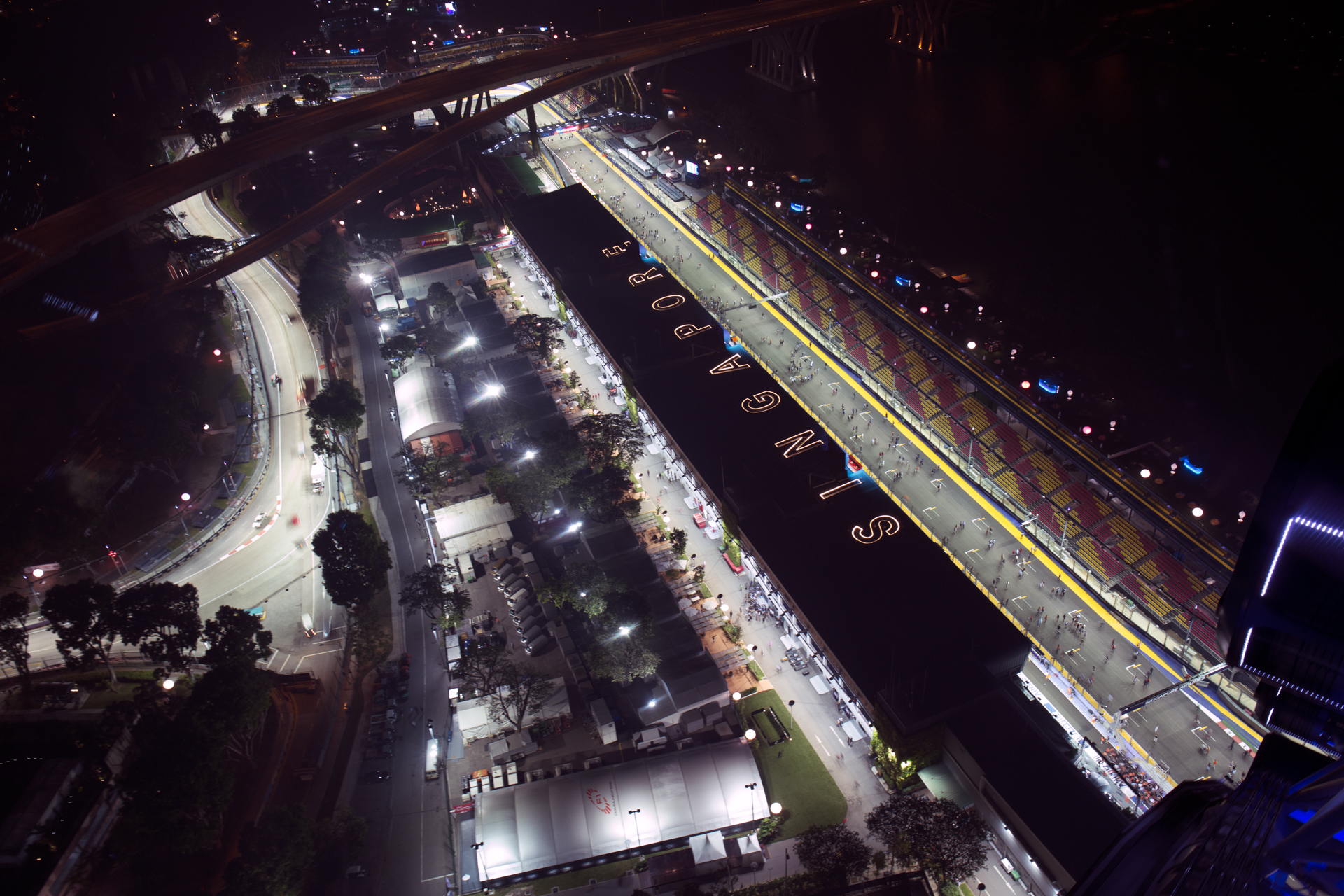
Marina Bay Street Circuit, where the race was held

The 2014 Singapore Grand Prix was the 14th of the 19 rounds in the 2014 Formula One World Championship, and the seventh Formula One Singapore race. It was held on 21 September at the 23-turn 5.065 km (3.147 mi) Marina Bay Street Circuit in Marina Bay. The official name was the 2014 Formula 1 Singapore Airlines Singapore Grand Prix, and was scheduled to last 61 laps. Tyre supplier Pirelli brought the red-banded super-soft "options" and yellow-marked soft "primes" dry tyre compounds to the race. There were 11 teams (each representing a different constructor) fielding two race drivers for the Grand Prix.

The drag reduction system (DRS) had two activation zones for the race; one was from turns five and seven, and the second was on the start/finish straight from the final to first corners. Parts of the track parts of the circuit were resurfaced with a mandatory track jet sweeper used to ensure the grip on the new asphalt equalled that from the old surface following the 2013 race. The outside turn seven barrier on the run-off area was realigned to allow traffic to drive behind it and the pit lane's fast section was resurfaced.

Before the race Mercedes driver Nico Rosberg led the Drivers' Championship with 238 championship points, 22 ahead of teammate Lewis Hamilton in second. Daniel Ricciardo was a further 50 championship points behind in third place. Valtteri Bottas was fourth with 122 championship points, one ahead of Fernando Alonso in fifth. Mercedes led the Constructors' Championship with 454 championship points, and Red Bull were second on 272 championship points. Williams in third had 172 championship points, Ferrari in fourth had 162 and McLaren were fifth with 110 championship points.

At the previous race in Italy, the gap between Rosberg and Hamilton closed to seven championship points. Hamilton started from pole position ahead of Rosberg, but a poor start dropped him to fourth. He retook the lead after Rosberg braked late and went straight on at the first turn and used the escape road to rejoin the track. Hamilton remained in the lead for the rest of the race to win. With six races left in the season, Hamilton said he was aware he could not lose any further ground to Rosberg in the championship and was pleased to have improved after winning at Monza: "Despite the highs and lows, I'm still well and truly in the hunt for the championship and that is something that gives me huge motivation for the final six races – starting in Singapore." Rosberg admitted Hamilton's form and past experience in championship battles could possibly be advantageous but was unconcerned about it and focused on himself: "At the moment, I am enjoying the moment more than I ever have in the sport because I get to a race and I have a car where I know I can be on pole and I can win," Ricciardo stated that while he was aware he had an unrealistic chance of winning the championship, he would take a race-by-race approach, and hoped to win one of the next two races to draw closer in the title battle: "All it takes is a couple of wins and a couple of bad races for the championship leader, and all of a sudden everything's possible again. So let's see what happens."

In the weeks before the race, the Fédération Internationale de l'Automobile (FIA; Formula One's governing body) race director Charlie Whiting, introduced a ban on certain pit-to-car communications, with a particular emphasis on banning driver "coaching"—such as describing their sector times relative to another competitor—under the sporting regulations stating a driver must drive the car "alone and unaided". Additionally, in the week of the race, the FIA banned teams from sending drivers coded messages either by radio or pit board, and decided that at the following round in Japan, they would be prohibited from sending information concerning tyres and brake wear. After team principals raised concerns about the extent of the ban three days before the race, the FIA revised what teams could tell their drivers by radio, including car performance and safety concerns. After persistent media speculation about his future at Caterham, the team confirmed that Kamui Kobayashi would enter the race.

== Practice ==
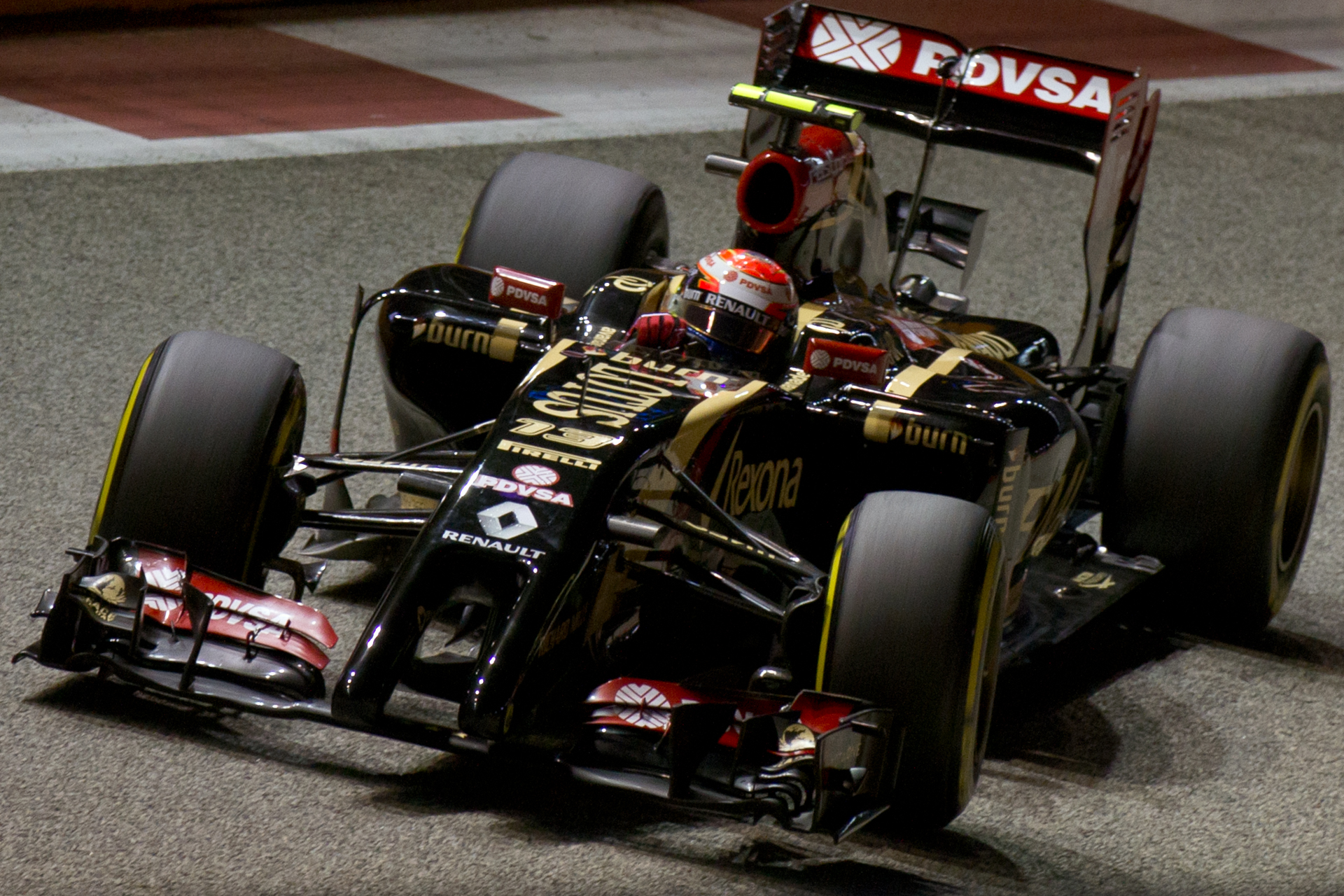
Pastor Maldonado caused the second practice session to be stopped after crashing at turn ten.

There were three evening practice sessions—two 90-minute sessions on Friday and a single 60-minute session on Saturday—preceding Sunday's race. In the first practice session, Alonso lapped fastest at 1:49.056, one-tenth of a second quicker than Hamilton in second. Rosberg, Vettel, Ricciardo, Jean-Éric Vergne, Kimi Räikkönen, Jenson Button, Daniil Kvyat and Sergio Pérez were in positions two through ten. Although several drivers narrowly avoided damaging their cars, the session passed relatively smoothly. Vergne's battery was changed, causing him to miss the first hour. After setting his fastest lap, he stopped with an energy recovery system failure, ending his session early. Räikkonen's session also ended early with brake fire. Vettel stopped at the pit lane exit with a sudden loss in oil pressure; he avoided a ten-place grid penalty because he used an older engine.

Hamilton, who had brake vibrations, set the day's fastest lap of 1:47.490 on the super soft compound tyres in the second practice session; Alonso, Ricciardo, Räikkönen, Vettel, the McLaren pair of Kevin Magnussen and Button, Pérez, Nico Hülkenberg and Kvyat followed in the top ten. The session was disrupted halfway through when Pastor Maldonado overdrove through turn 10, lost control of his car's rear, and slid into the right-hand exit barriers, damaging the front-right hand corner. After the session, Lotus constructed a new E22 chassis overnight for Maldonado for the remainder of the event. In the final practice session, held in cloudy weather, Alonso set the fastest lap of the weekend so far at 1:47.299, 0.051 seconds faster than Ricciardo in second. Rosberg was third after a slow first sector and went over the turn 11 kerbs. Vergne, Vettel, Hamilton, Felipe Massa, Bottas, Räikkönen and Esteban Gutiérrez completed the top ten.

== Qualifying ==
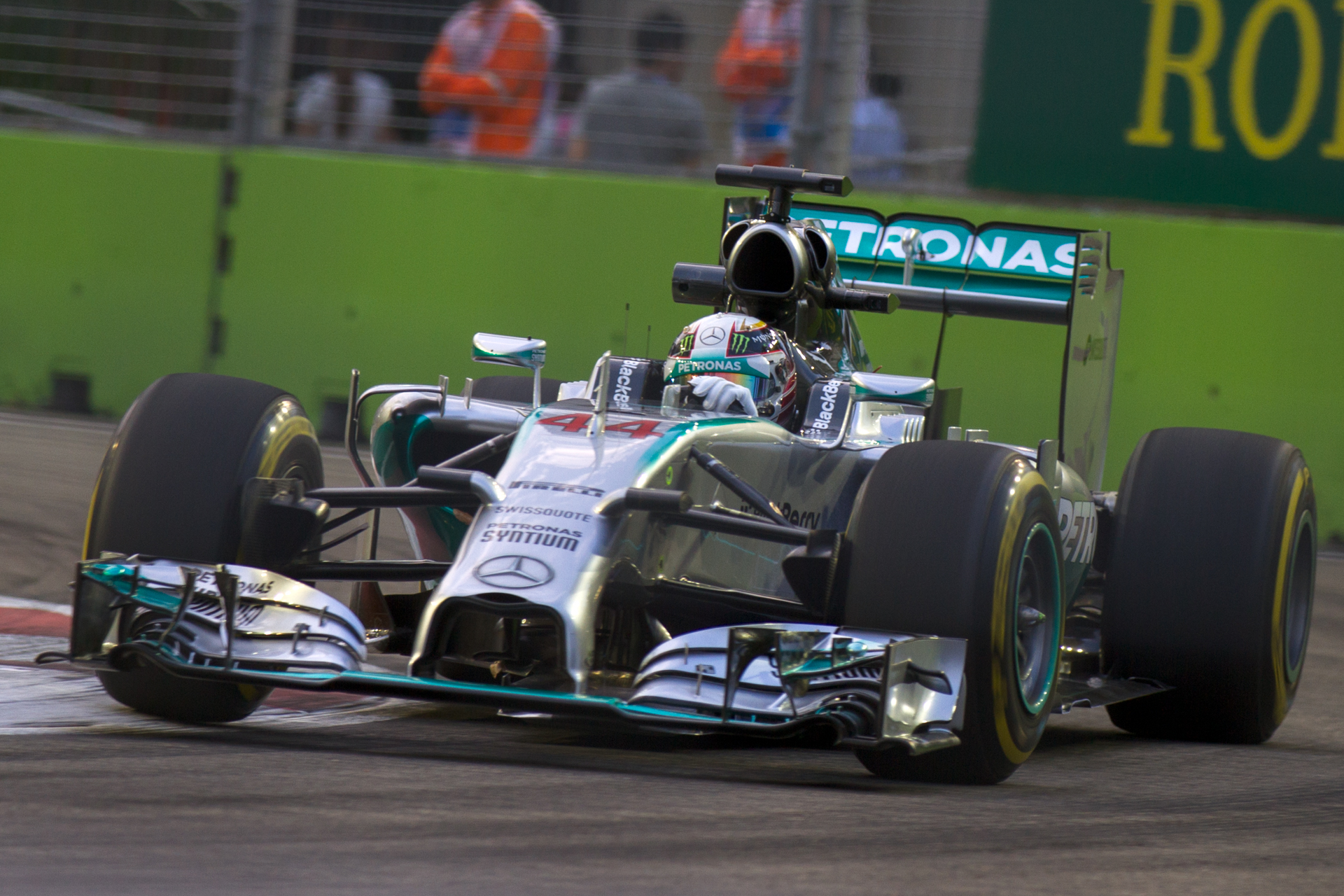
Lewis Hamilton took his sixth pole position of the season and the 37th of his career.

Saturday afternoon's qualifying session was divided into three parts. The first session ran for 18 minutes, eliminating cars that finished 17th or below. The 107% rule was in effect, requiring drivers to reach a time within 107 per cent of the quickest lap to qualify. The second part lasted 15 minutes, eliminating cars that finished 11th to 16th. The final session ran for 12 minutes determined pole position to tenth. Cars in the final session were not allowed to change tyres, using the tyres with which they set their quickest lap times in the second session. Although Hamilton lost two-tenths of a second locking his tyres entering turn one and subsequently missing its apex, he set the fastest time in the final session to achieve his sixth pole position of the season, and the 37th of his career with a lap of 1:45.681. He was joined on the grid's front row by Rosberg, who called it "the most difficult qualifying of my career so far" because he had difficulty finding a rhythm and changed his brakes for qualifying. Ricciardo took third and had pole position until both Mercedes drivers went faster in the session's final seconds. He was ahead of teammate Vettel in fourth who believed pole position could have been his after feeling he overdrove. Alonso made a minor set-up change, giving him confidence; he qualified fifth. Massa took sixth, ahead of Räikkönen, who was quickest in the first session, and was satisfied with his car's handling, but his engine shut down while preparing for a second timed lap in the final session.

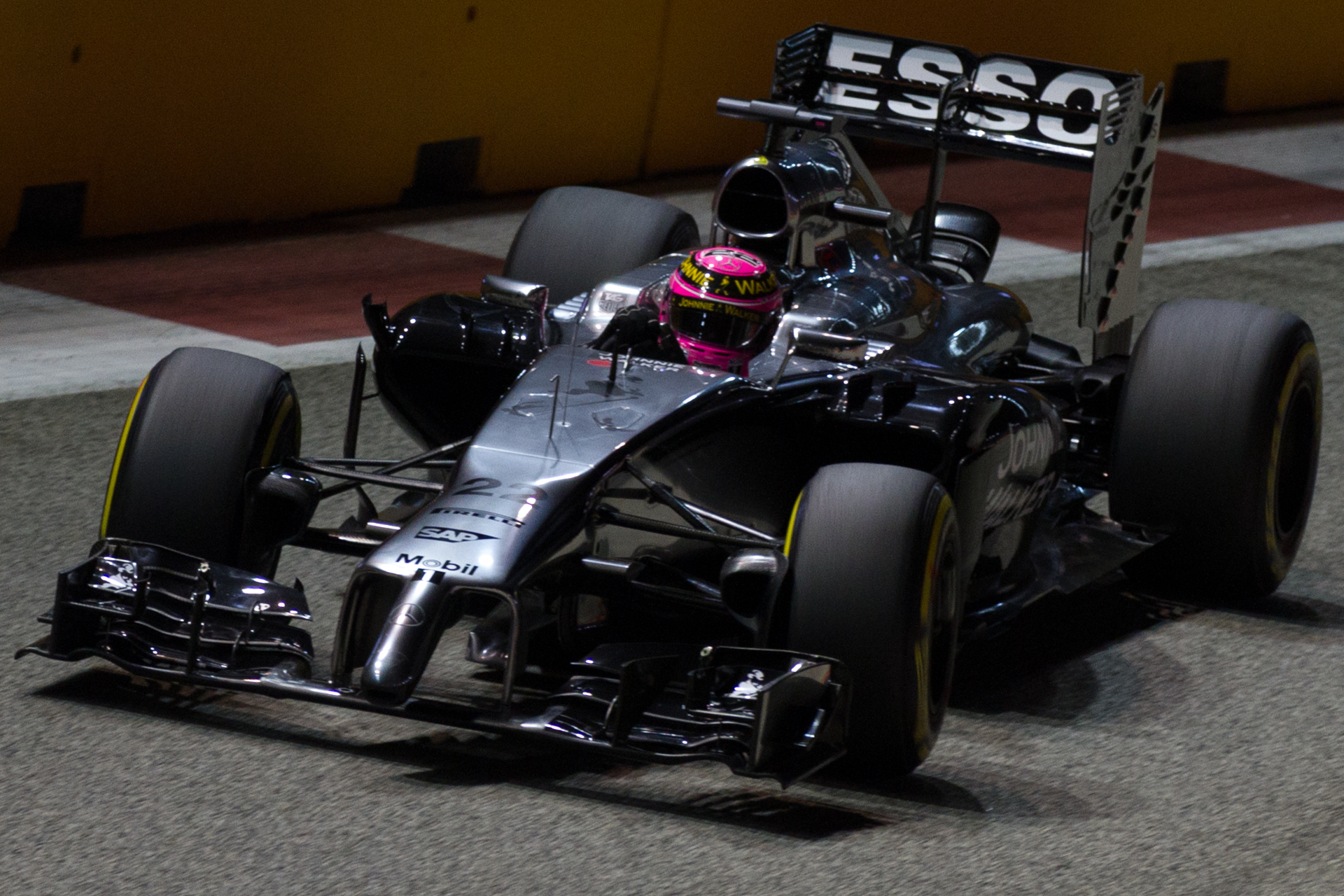
Jenson Button struggled with front-end grip and was the fastest driver not to advance into the final qualifying session.

Bottas's preparation for his final timed lap was slightly compromised, and an error in the first turn left him eighth. Magnussen took ninth and Kvyat was tenth after only having the super soft compound tyre available. Button was the fastest driver not to qualify for the final session; he locked his front tyres at the turn 13 hairpin on his final timed lap and went wide, losing him time, and struggled with front grip despite a change of engine and differential settings. Vergne had front grip issues, and locked his tyres, putting him 12th. Force India's Hülkenberg and Pérez qualified 13th and 15th respectively after being unable to improve on their second attempts; Gutiérrez's faster Sauber car separated them. Romain Grosjean was the slowest driver in the second session; a turbocharger wastegate problem slowed him and he radioed his frustration to Lotus after being eliminated. Adrian Sutil failed to advance beyond the first session due to energy management and engine problems. Maldonado had the same turbocharger issue as his teammate and qualified 18th. Minor errors on Jules Bianchi's first timed lap left him 19th. Bianchi was ahead of Kobayashi in 20th. Max Chilton, 21st, could not extract full engine power on his first attempt because of mapping problems and had to prepare for another lap. Marcus Ericsson ventured onto the track late in the first session after his team worked quickly to rectify an electrical issue and qualified 22nd.

=== Qualifying classification ===
The fastest lap in each of the three sessions are denoted in bold.

Pos.	No.	Driver	Constructor	Q1	Q2	Q3	Grid
1	44	(United Kingdom) Lewis Hamilton	Mercedes	1:46.921	1:46.287	**1:45.681**	1
2	6	(Germany) Nico Rosberg	Mercedes	1:47.244	**1:45.825**	1:45.688	2
3	3	(Australia) Daniel Ricciardo	Red Bull Racing-Renault	1:47.488	1:46.493	1:45.854	3
4	1	(Germany) Sebastian Vettel	Red Bull Racing-Renault	1:47.476	1:46.586	1:45.902	4
5	14	(Spain) Fernando Alonso	Ferrari	1:46.889	1:46.328	1:45.907	5
6	19	(Brazil) Felipe Massa	Williams-Mercedes	1:47.615	1:46.472	1:46.000	6
7	7	(Finland) Kimi Räikkönen	Ferrari	**1:46.685**	1:46.359	1:46.170	7
8	77	(Finland) Valtteri Bottas	Williams-Mercedes	1:47.196	1:46.622	1:46.187	8
9	20	(Denmark) Kevin Magnussen	McLaren-Mercedes	1:47.976	1:46.700	1:46.250	9
10	26	(Russia) Daniil Kvyat	Toro Rosso-Renault	1:47.656	1:46.926	1:47.362	10
11	22	(United Kingdom) Jenson Button	McLaren-Mercedes	1:47.161	1:46.943	N/A	11
12	25	(France) Jean-Éric Vergne	Toro Rosso-Renault	1:47.407	1:46.989	N/A	12
13	27	(Germany) Nico Hülkenberg	Force India-Mercedes	1:47.370	1:47.308	N/A	13
14	21	(Mexico) Esteban Gutiérrez	Sauber-Ferrari	1:47.970	1:47.333	N/A	14
15	11	(Mexico) Sergio Pérez	Force India-Mercedes	1:48.143	1:47.575	N/A	15
16	8	(France) Romain Grosjean	Lotus-Renault	1:47.862	1:47.812	N/A	16
17	99	(Germany) Adrian Sutil	Sauber-Ferrari	1:48.324	N/A	N/A	17
18	13	(Venezuela) Pastor Maldonado	Lotus-Renault	1:49.063	N/A	N/A	18
19	17	(France) Jules Bianchi	Marussia-Ferrari	1:49.440	N/A	N/A	19
20	10	(Japan) Kamui Kobayashi	Caterham-Renault	1:50.405	N/A	N/A	20
21	4	(United Kingdom) Max Chilton	Marussia-Ferrari	1:50.473	N/A	N/A	21
22	9	(Sweden) Marcus Ericsson	Caterham-Renault	1:52.287	N/A	N/A	22
107% time: 1:54.152

== Race ==
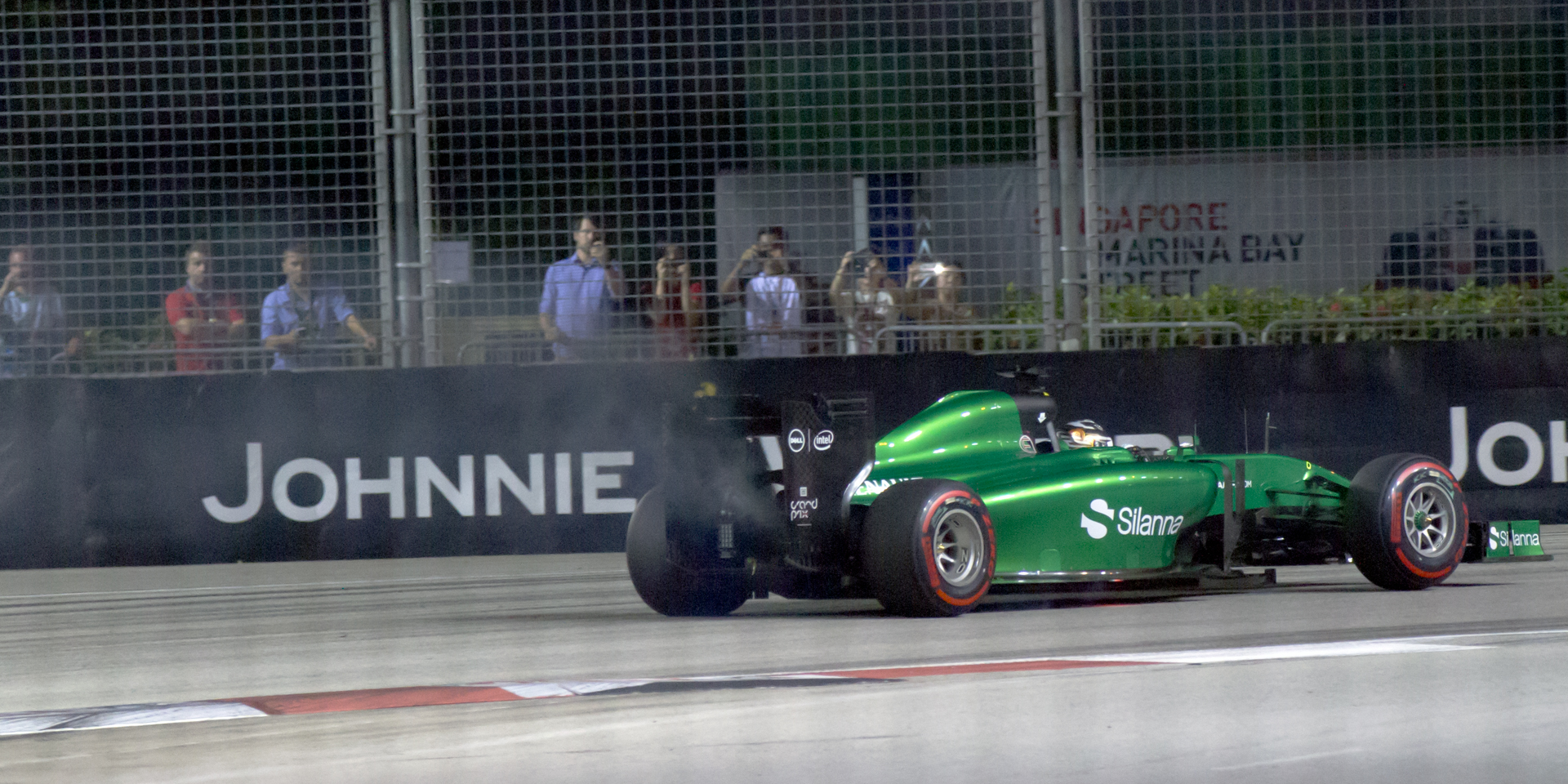
Kamui Kobayashi failed to start the race due to an oil pressure problem.

The weather at the start was dry and clear, with the air temperature between 28 and 30 °C (82 and 86 °F) and a track temperature from 33 to 37 °C (91 to 99 °F). All drivers started on the super soft compound tyre. Rosberg's car had a faulty steering wheel control due to a wiring loom problem. Although he made the starting grid after a steering wheel change and computer reset, the problem persisted and he began from the pit lane. Kobayashi's car developed an oil pressure issue on the formation lap and pulled off the circuit, preventing him from starting. When the race began at 20:00 Singapore Standard Time (UTC+08:00), Hamilton led the field into the first corner. Ricciardo's engine briefly lost power, preventing him from passing teammate Vettel. Alonso attempted to pass the Red Bull cars to their right but entered turn one too quickly, locked his front-left tyre, and drove onto the run-off area, falling to third.

Magnussen passed Massa for sixth outside of track limits at turn five, but slid sideways at turn seven while holding off teammate Button, dropping to ninth. Button gained four positions by the end of the first lap, while Rosberg fell to 22nd over the same distance. At the end of the first lap, Hamilton led Vettel, Alonso, Ricciardo, Räikkönen, Massa, Button, Bottas, Magnussen and Kvyat. The stewards investigated Alonso's start but took no further action. Rosberg left the pit lane on the second lap but was initially unable to keep up with Chilton's Marussia. DRS was enabled on the third lap as the field spread out. The stewards investigated Magnussen for violating track limits. McLaren teammates Magnussen and Button avoided a collision on lap four and the Williams duo passed them. Vettel kept Hamilton's lead constant, causing the latter to go faster by 1/2 a second while conserving fuel.

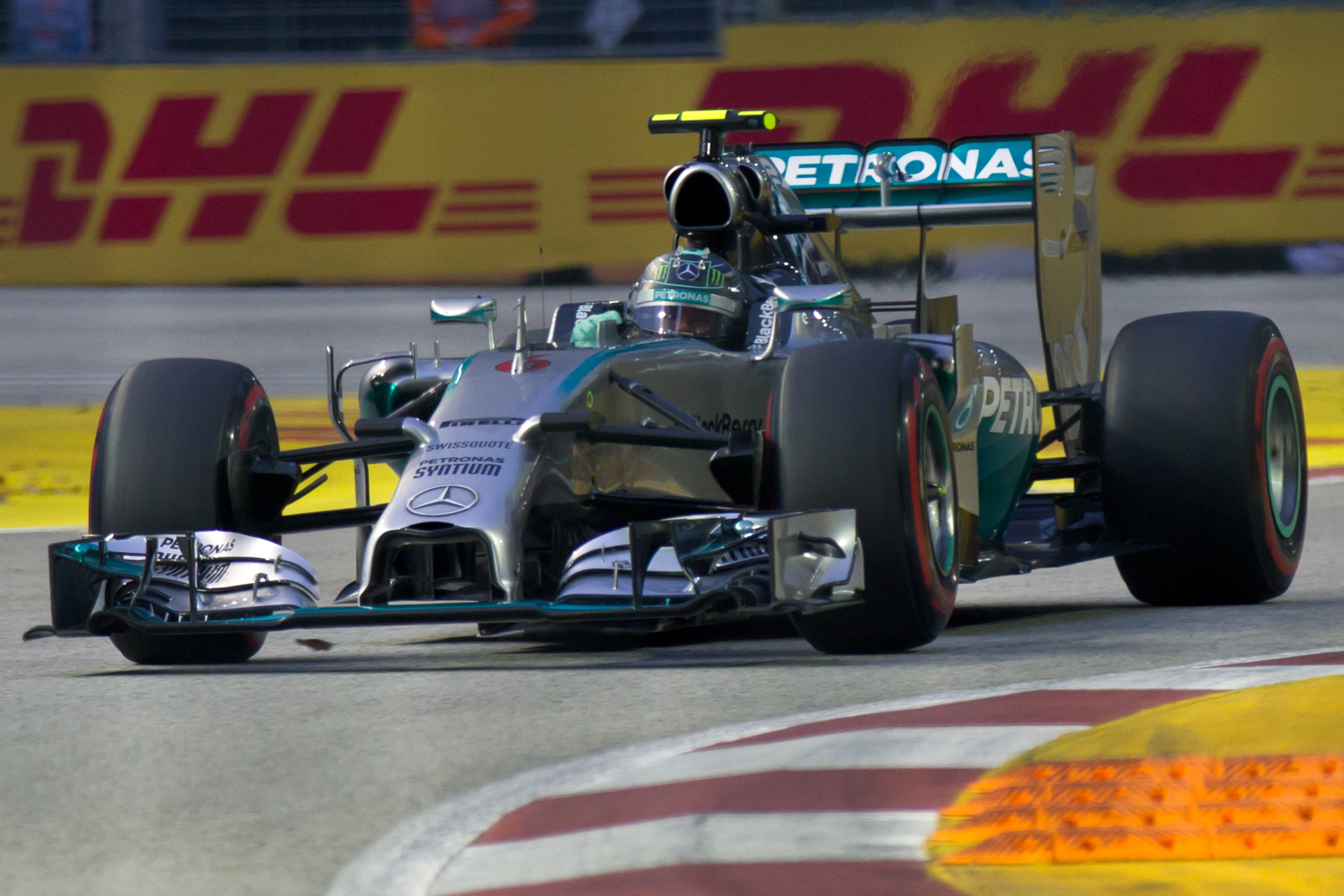
Nico Rosberg started from the pit lane because of a steering wiring loom fault and retired after 13 laps.

Rosberg overtook Chilton to move into 20th on lap five, while Kvyat was told by radio to battle Magnussen after lapping 0.3 seconds faster than Magnussen in the first sector on the next lap. Rosberg could not pass Ericsson and was more than 40 seconds behind Hamilton by that lap. It was announced on lap seven that there would be no further action against Magnussen. Magnussen, Kvyat and Vergne were within one second of each other and battled for ninth place. Vergne encouraged his teammate Kvyat to cede a position to him but Kvyat insisted he could pass Magnussen. Vergne overtook teammate Kvyat for tenth on lap eight and began gaining on Magnussen. Rosberg was limited to two gears and was five seconds slower than teammate Hamilton. Hamilton led by five seconds by the start of lap ten despite car balance problems over a single lap. Massa ran close behind Räikkönen until his first pit stop at the end of the lap as part of the Williams' team plan to pass the latter through strategy. Räikkönen made his stop on the following lap and emerged behind Massa.

Bottas entered the pit lane on lap 11 with Vettel, Alonso and Ricciardo stopping on the next lap. After Kvyat made his stop, he rejoined behind Rosberg but overtook him shortly after. Hamilton made his pit stop from the lead on lap 14, and retained it, narrowly in front of Button. Rosberg was informed by radio that he could not go past 6,500 revolutions per minute in first gear because of a faulty pit lane limiter. He slowly entered the pit lane on lap 14 and purposely stalled his car as his tyres and steering wheel were changed. Mechanics switched Rosberg's car off and he selected multiple buttons on his steering wheel to try and change gear. After almost two minutes, Rosberg's car was pushed into his garage to be retired. Massa overtook Pérez for sixth place on the 15th lap. Vergne incurred a five-second stop-and-go penalty on the following lap after he was deemed to have exceeded track limits. On lap 19 Gutiérrez retired in his garage with an engine electrical problem. Two laps later, Chilton made an unscheduled pit stop after a wheel value punctured his front-right tyre.

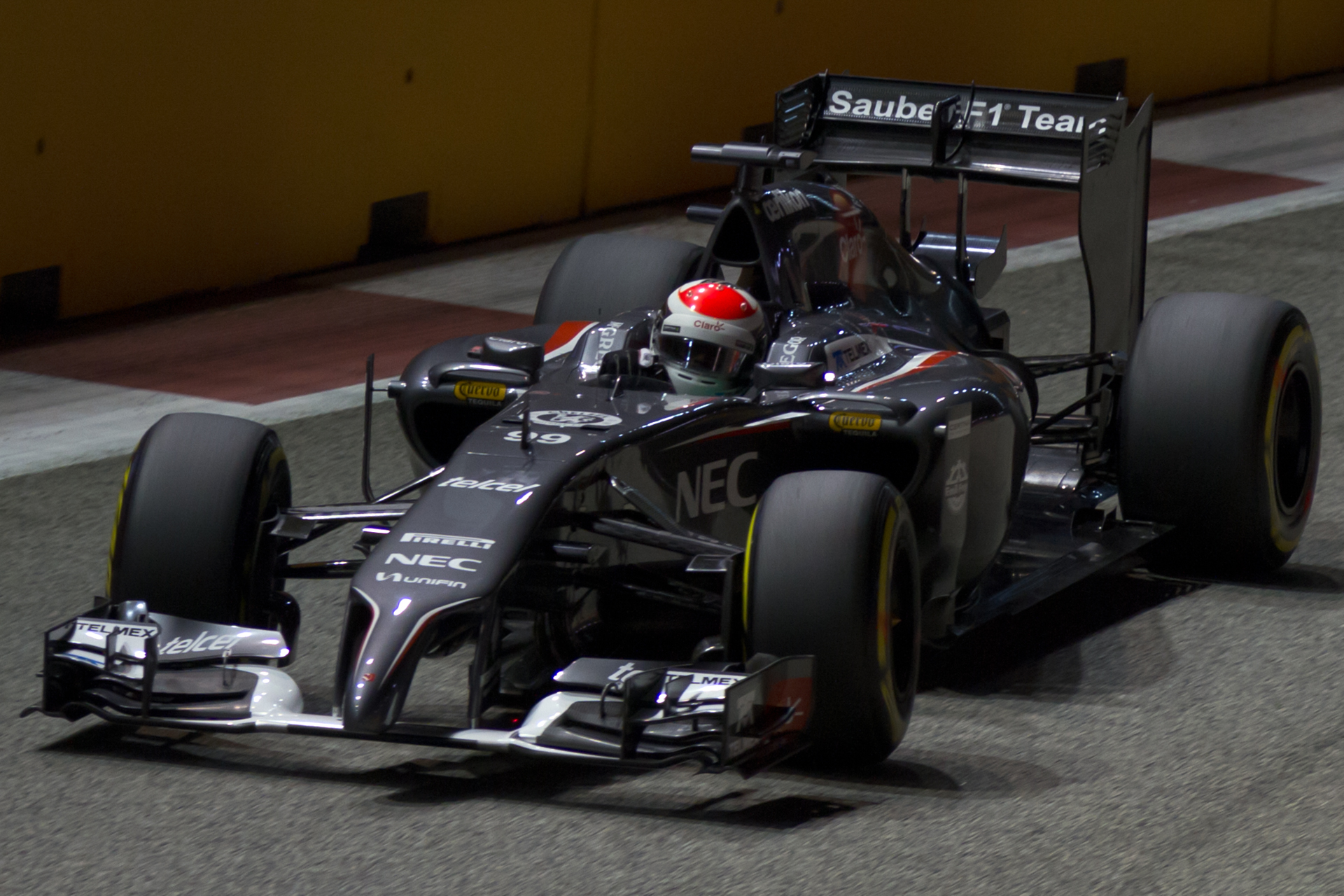
Adrian Sutil prompted the safety car's deployment after colliding with Sergio Pérez.

On lap 23, Räikkönen drew closer to Massa and the Williams team responded by bringing the latter into the pit lane for soft compound tyres for a potential strategic overtake. He rejoined in ninth behind teammate Bottas. Hamilton pulled away from Vettel who was caught by Alonso. By the 24th lap, Alonso had the potential to pass Vettel after the pit stops. That lap, Ferrari brought Alonso into the pit lane for super soft compound tyres. Vettel made his pit stop on lap 25 for soft compound tyres and emerged in third behind Alonso's faster Ferrari. Massa overtook Hülkenberg on the main straight for eighth on the same lap. Hamilton made his stop for super soft compound tyres on the following lap, giving the lead to Ricciardo; his team used a large time gap to remove rubber debris on his front wing. Ricciardo took his pit stop on lap 27 returning the lead to Hamilton. Grosjean was close behind Pérez but he could not pass him. Pérez attempted an overtake Sutil on the straight on the 30th lap, and Sutil squeezed Pérez into a wall, clipping the left-front nose cone section. It slid under Pérez's wheel, littering the track with debris, and prompting the safety car's deployment, to allow marshals to remove debris from the track.

Some drivers elected to make pit stops to switch onto the soft compound tyres; Ferrari brought their drivers in to enable them to reach the end of the race without the need for another pit stop. Hamilton's race engineer Peter Bonnington cautioned him about the debris but Hamilton did not receive the warning in time and drove over shards of wing. He inquired about tyre pressures and was told no issues had been discovered. Sutil incurred a five-second stop-and-go penalty for the collision with Pérez. The safety car was withdrawn at the end of the 37th lap and racing resumed with Hamilton in first. Hamilton set the race's fastest lap of 1:50.417 on lap 39 to lead Vettel by 5.8 seconds. Sutil's car developed a water leak and retired two laps later to prevent the risk of an engine failure.

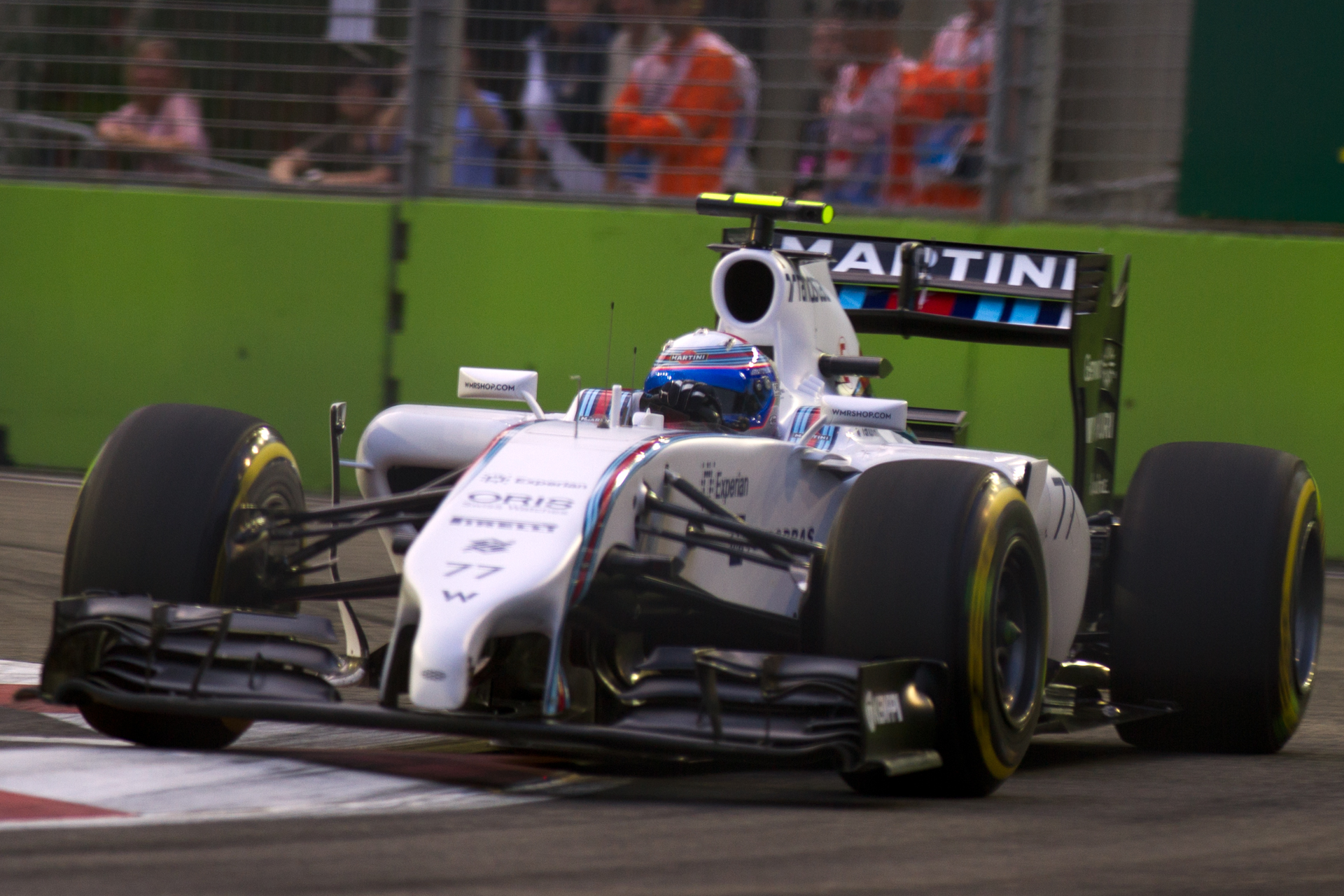
Valtteri Bottas fell to eleventh when his tyres lost grip in the race's closing period.

Hamilton led Vettel by 24 seconds by the next lap and wanted to make a pit stop because he was worried about tyre wear but was advised to further grow his advantage over the next three laps. Hamilton made his final pit stop for the soft compound tyres on lap 52. He rejoined in second behind Vettel and narrowly ahead of Ricciardo. Hamilton quickly caught Vettel, used DRS leaving turn five, and turned right to reclaim the lead two corners later on lap 54. Button stopped at the side of the track to retire with a power box failure on the same lap. His retirement promoted Räikkönen to seventh and Bottas' worn tyres slowed him, enabling Hülkenberg, Vergne and Pérez to run close behind him. Maldonado's aspiration for his first championship point of 2014 was not realised when Magnussen passed him for tenth place on lap 56. Three laps later, Vergne passed Hülkenberg for eighth place. Vergne overtook Räikkönen for seventh on the inside into the first corner and then Bottas for sixth. Pérez had better traction than teammate Hülkenberg and passed him between turns 17 and 18.

Pérez passed Räikkönen into turn 10 and took seventh when Bottas lost all tyre grip and fell from the top ten quickly. Because of the safety car period, the race ended under a two-hour time limit. In the remaining eight laps, Hamilton distanced himself from Vettel and was the first to finish after 60 laps for his seventh victory of the season and the 29th of his career. Vettel finished second in his best result of the season, 13.534 seconds behind, and successfully held off teammate Ricciardo and Alonso in the final laps. Massa finished fifth. Vergne's five-second time penalty did not affect his sixth-place finish. Pérez, Räikkönen, Hülkenberg and Magnussen were seventh through tenth. Bottas, Maldonado, Grosjean, Kvyat and Ericsson, Bianchi and Chilton were the final finishers. There were four lead changes in the race; three drivers reached the front of the field. Hamilton led three times for a total of 58 laps, more than any other driver.

=== Post-race ===
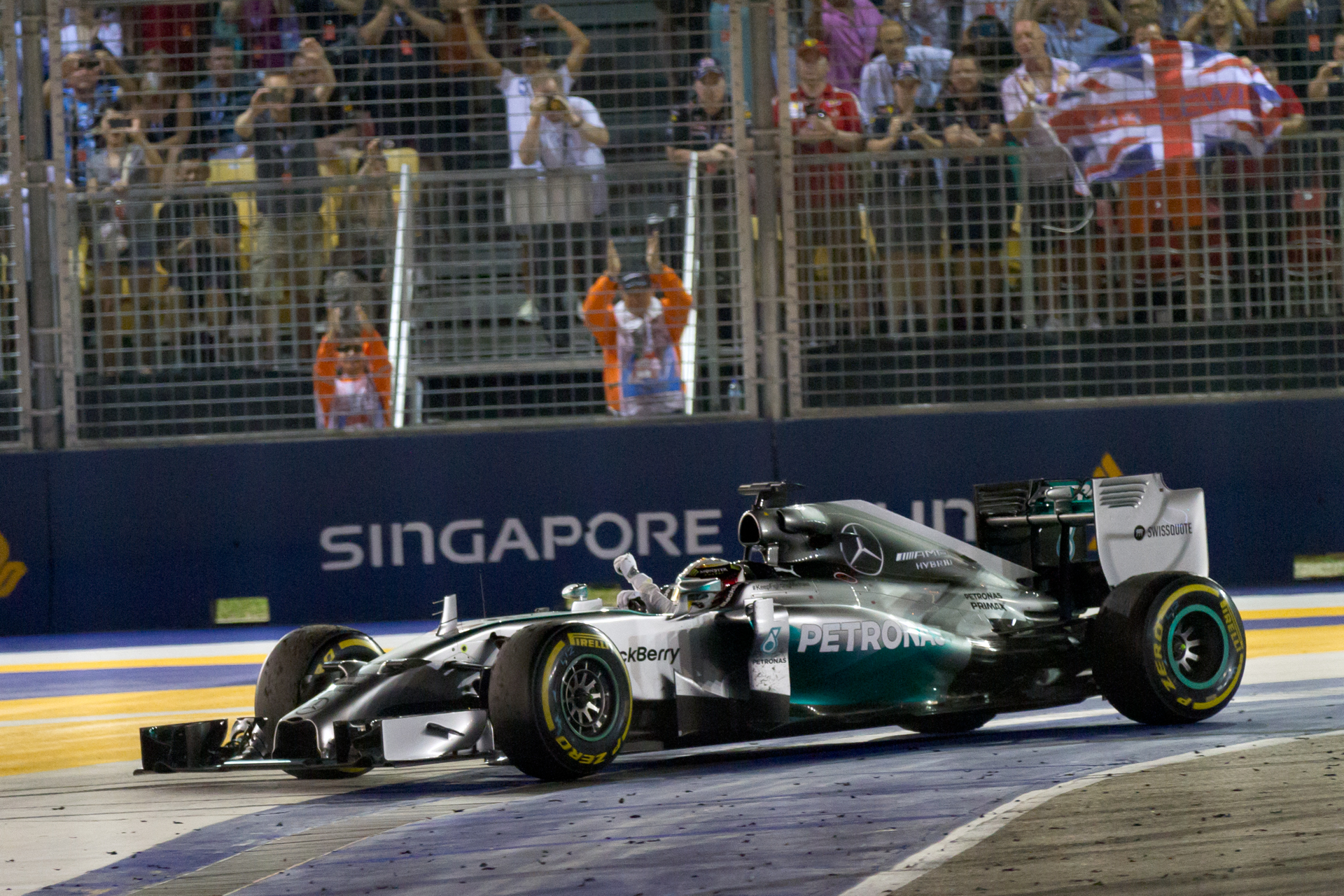
Lewis Hamilton celebrating his seventh victory of the season and the 29th of his career.

At the podium interviews, conducted by pundit and former team principal Eddie Jordan, Hamilton said he did not feel any pressure at his final pit stop because he felt comfortable with his large lead. Vettel said his team altered their strategy before the safety car and the final laps on worn tyres were "very, very much borderline" and emphasised the challenge of the track in hot and humid weather. Ricciardo said the event felt like a "home race" and that he would watch Alonso's first lap to see whether he should have ceded another position to Vettel. In the later press conference, Hamilton felt the race would have been "hardcore" had Rosberg not retired and knew Mercedes would not be "100 percent happy" because they aspired to secure victories collectively and be the series' most dominant team. Vettel revealed how uncomfortable he felt that he could not reach the end of the race on worn tyres but stated second was the best possible result for Red Bull. Ricciardo was satisfied to pressure his teammate Vettel but felt it was a processional event for the top three.

Rosberg called his race "the toughest of the year" and deemed it worse than the British Grand Prix where he retired with a gearbox failure. He stated that his car's reliability needed the most attention and wanted to understand the problem: "It’s tough not even leaving the grid. I was hoping the team could fix it [after the race had started] because it was going on and off, sometimes working, sometimes not. There's no point in shouting, it's a reliability issue, and it's happened again." Mercedes team principal Toto Wolff apologised to Rosberg immediately following the driver's retirement, saying it was "a bitter moment" to lose ground in the Drivers' Championship. He stated he did not want to see the championship decided on reliability and Mercedes needed to discover the origin of their problems. The team's technical director Paddy Lowe added reliability concerns worried him throughout the season and hoped it would not be repeated in the future.

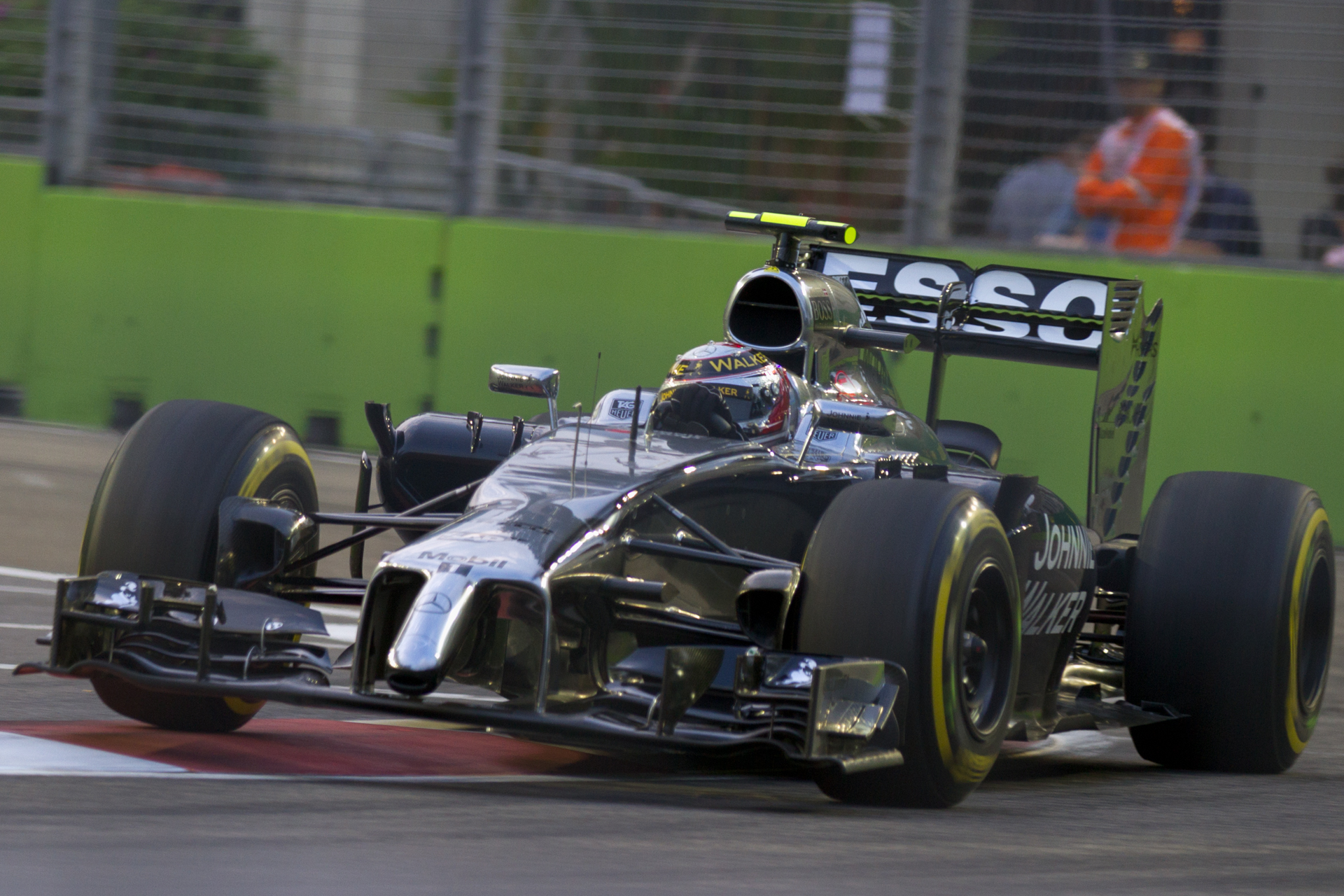
Kevin Magnussen suffered from back burns and dehydration after his drinks bottle became hot because of a broken radiator seal.

Post-race, trainer Antti Vierula treated Magnussen for dehydration and minor burns on his lower back with an iced towel and McLaren sought a doctor who tended to Magnussen in its hospitality building. His condition was caused by a broken radiator seal possibly loosened after mounting the turn seven kerbs early in the race, causing hot air to be directed into his cockpit, warming his seat and drinks bottle. He found the water in his drink bottle very hot to consume and radioed his team it burned his mouth. Magnussen raised his arms out of the cockpit to direct cool air down his sleeves and onto his back to alleviate the pain. He called his tenth-place finish "the hardest-earnt point I've ever had" and the McLaren team principal Éric Boullier said his performance under the circumstances was a "scant consolidation" and praised Magnussen for being "indicative of his tremendous fighting spirit". Magnussen posted on Twitter reports of his condition were exaggerated and said he felt "just hot and sweaty." Kvyat also suffered from dehydration when his water supply malfunctioned after two-thirds race distance.

Alonso said he believed the timing of the safety car and not a strategy error prevented him from finishing on the podium: "The moment of the safety car was probably not good, but sometimes it helps and sometimes it doesn't help. Today it didn't help." Ferrari team principal Marco Mattiacci defended his team's strategy and did not believe anything specific prevented them from finishing on the podium: "Definitely the safety car didn't do any better for us, but the race is made of 60 laps. We squeezed the car as much as we could; the strategy from the pits was excellent. There were other variables we know we cannot control. We did our best." Boullier suggested Red Bull used coded messages to assist Ricciardo when they told Ricciardo to stay off the kerbs but stressed it was the FIA's task to investigate. Red Bull team principal Christian Horner asked Whiting for clarification because Ricciardo had battery damage from mounting the kerbs. The governing body confirmed it was satisfied with Red Bull's radio messages and said the team abided by the rules.

The result regained Hamilton the lead of the World Drivers' Championship with 241 championship points. Rosberg's retirement dropped him to second, three championship points behind Hamilton. Ricciardo consolidated third place with 181 championship points, and Alonso and Vettel moved ahead of Bottas for fourth and fifth. Mercedes further extended their lead in the World Constructors' Championship to 182 championship points over of Red Bull in second place. Williams and Ferrari remained in third and fourth places and Force India moved ahead of McLaren to move into fifth position with five races left in the season.

=== Race classification ===
Drivers who scored championship points are denoted in bold.

Pos.	No.	Driver	Constructor	Laps	Time/Retired	Grid	Points
1	44	(United Kingdom) **Lewis Hamilton**	**Mercedes**	60	2:00:04.795	1	25
2	1	(Germany) **Sebastian Vettel**	**Red Bull Racing-Renault**	60	+13.534	4	18
3	3	(Australia) **Daniel Ricciardo**	**Red Bull Racing-Renault**	60	+14.273	3	15
4	14	(Spain) **Fernando Alonso**	**Ferrari**	60	+15.389	5	12
5	19	(Brazil) **Felipe Massa**	**Williams-Mercedes**	60	+42.161	6	10
6	25	(France) **Jean-Éric Vergne**	**Toro Rosso-Renault**	60	+56.801^{1}	12	8
7	11	(Mexico) **Sergio Pérez**	**Force India-Mercedes**	60	+59.038	15	6
8	7	(Finland) **Kimi Räikkönen**	**Ferrari**	60	+1:00.641	7	4
9	27	(Germany) **Nico Hülkenberg**	**Force India-Mercedes**	60	+1:01.661	13	2
10	20	(Denmark) **Kevin Magnussen**	**McLaren-Mercedes**	60	+1:02.230	9	1
11	77	(Finland) Valtteri Bottas	Williams-Mercedes	60	+1:05.065	8	
12	13	(Venezuela) Pastor Maldonado	Lotus-Renault	60	+1:06.915	18	
13	8	(France) Romain Grosjean	Lotus-Renault	60	+1:08.029	16	
14	26	(Russia) Daniil Kvyat	Toro Rosso-Renault	60	+1:12.008	10	
15	9	(Sweden) Marcus Ericsson	Caterham-Renault	60	+1:34.188	22	
16	17	(France) Jules Bianchi	Marussia-Ferrari	60	+1:34.543	19	
17	4	(United Kingdom) Max Chilton	Marussia-Ferrari	59	+1 Lap	21	
Ret	22	(United Kingdom) Jenson Button	McLaren-Mercedes	52	Electrical	11	
Ret	99	(Germany) Adrian Sutil	Sauber-Ferrari	40	Water leak	17	
Ret	21	(Mexico) Esteban Gutiérrez	Sauber-Ferrari	17	Electrical	14	
Ret	6	(Germany) Nico Rosberg	Mercedes	13	Steering wheel	PL^{2}	
DNS	10	(Japan) Kamui Kobayashi	Caterham-Renault	0	Oil pressure	–^{3}	

Notes:

- **^1** – Jean-Éric Vergne had five seconds added to his race time for exceeding track limits.
- **^2** – Nico Rosberg started from pit lane due to electronic problems at the start of the formation lap.
- **^3** – Kamui Kobayashi's engine failed during the formation lap and he failed to make it to the starting grid.

== Championship standings after the race ==
Drivers' Championship standings

+/–	Pos.	Driver	Points
1	1	(United Kingdom) Lewis Hamilton*	241
1	2	(Germany) Nico Rosberg*	238
	3	(Australia) Daniel Ricciardo*	181
1	4	(Spain) Fernando Alonso*	133
1	5	(Germany) Sebastian Vettel*	124

Constructors' Championship standings

+/–	Pos.	Driver	Points
	1	(Germany) Mercedes*	479
	2	(Austria) Red Bull Racing-Renault*	305
	3	(United Kingdom) Williams-Mercedes	187
	4	(Italy) Ferrari	178
1	5	Force India-Mercedes	117
Sources:

- Note: Only the top five positions are included for both sets of standings.
- Bold text and an asterisk indicates competitors who still had a theoretical chance of becoming World Champion.

== Footnotes and references ==
=== References ===
Previous race: 2014 Italian Grand Prix	FIA Formula One World Championship; 2014 season	Next race: 2014 Japanese Grand Prix
Previous race: 2013 Singapore Grand Prix	Singapore Grand Prix	Next race: 2015 Singapore Grand Prix
