= Stonington =

Stonington may refer to:

== Places ==
Antarctica

- Stonington Island, Marguerite Bay

United States

- Stonington, Connecticut (town)
  - Stonington (borough), Connecticut (incorporated borough)
- Stonington, Illinois
- Stonington, Indiana
- Stonington, Maine
- Stonington, Michigan

== People ==
- Emily Stonington, American politician from Montana (1947-2019)

== See also ==
- Stonnington (disambiguation)
