= 2014 Italian Grand Prix =

Race 13 of 19 in the 2014 Formula One World Championship
← Previous race	Next race →
- Layout of the Autodromo Nazionale di Monza

Race details
- Date: 7 September 2014
- Official name: Formula 1 Gran Premio d'Italia 2014
- Location: Autodromo Nazionale di Monza, Monza, Lombardy
- Course: Permanent racing facility
- Course length: 5.793 km (3.600 miles)
- Distance: 53 laps, 306.720 km (190.587 (Note: There is a 0.309 km (0.192 mi) offset between the start and finish lines.) miles)
- Weather: Sunny; Air: 25 °C (77 °F), Track: 37 to 42 °C (99 to 108 °F)

Pole position
Driver	(United Kingdom) Lewis Hamilton	Mercedes
- Time: 1:24.109

Fastest lap
Driver	(United Kingdom) Lewis Hamilton	Mercedes
- Time: 1:28.004 on lap 29

Podium
First	(United Kingdom) Lewis Hamilton	Mercedes
Second	(Germany) Nico Rosberg	Mercedes
Third	(Brazil) Felipe Massa	Williams-Mercedes

The 2014 Italian Grand Prix (formally the Formula 1 Gran Premio d'Italia 2014) was a Formula One motor race held on 7 September at the Autodromo Nazionale di Monza in Monza, Lombardy. It was the 13th round of the 2014 Formula One World Championship and the 65th Italian Grand Prix held as part of the series. Mercedes driver Lewis Hamilton won the 53-lap race from pole position. His teammate Nico Rosberg finished second and Williams driver Felipe Massa took third.

Before the race, Rosberg led the World Drivers' Championship and Mercedes led the World Constructors' Championship. Hamilton claimed the 36th pole position of his career by recording the fastest lap in the third qualifying session but a slow start dropped him behind Rosberg. He returned to second by lap ten and drew closer to teammate Rosberg. He was instructed by radio to remain at least 2.5 seconds behind Rosberg but opted to ignore the message and took the lead on lap 29 when Rosberg ran off the circuit. Hamilton maintained the lead for the rest of the race to achieve his sixth victory of the season and the 28th of his career. There were three lead changes among two different drivers during the course of the race.

The result saw Hamilton lower Rosberg's lead in the World Drivers' Championship to 22 championship points with Daniel Ricciardo remaining in third position. Valtteri Bottas moved to fourth position while Ferrari's Fernando Alonso did not finish the race and fell to fifth. Mercedes increased their lead in the World Constructors' Championship to 182 championship points over the second-placed Red Bull. Williams overtook Ferrari for third with six races left in the season.

== Background ==
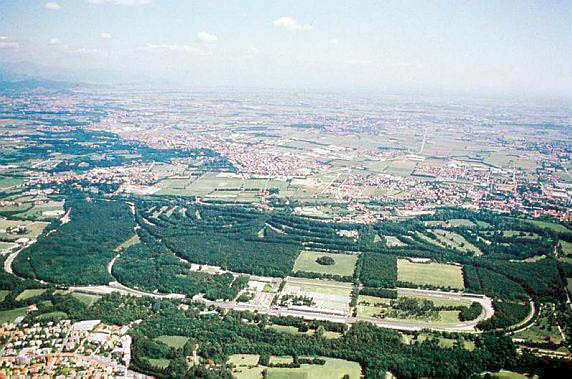
The Autodromo Nazionale di Monza, where the race was held.

The 2014 Italian Grand Prix was the 13th of the 19 round 2014 Formula One World Championship, and the 65th running of the event as part of the series. It was held on 7 September at the 5.793 km (3.600 mi) 11-turn Autodromo Nazionale di Monza in Monza, Lombardy. The drag reduction system (DRS) had two activation zones for the race: one was on the straight between the second Lesmo corner and the Ascari chicane, and the second was on the straight linking Parabolica to the Rettifilo chicane. Tyre supplier Pirelli brought the white-banded medium and orange-banded hard dry tyre compounds to the race.

Before the race Mercedes driver Nico Rosberg led the World Drivers' Championship with 220 championship points, ahead of teammate Lewis Hamilton in second and Daniel Ricciardo in third. Fernando Alonso was fourth with 121 championship points and Valtteri Bottas was a further 11 championship points behind in fifth. Mercedes led the World Constructors' Championship with 411 championship points, and Red Bull were second with 254 championship points. Ferrari and Williams were third and fourth and McLaren were fifth.

Following a collision between Hamilton and Rosberg on the second lap of the preceding Belgian Grand Prix, the third such incident surrounding the Mercedes team in 2014, which went back to qualifying for the Monaco Grand Prix when Rosberg was accused of spoiling Hamilton's lap, the Mercedes team principal Toto Wolff threatened sanctions against one driver if a similar situation happened again and insisted that both men were obliged to serve the team's interests. Hamilton said his objective at Monza was to regain some of the lost ground in the World Drivers' Championship and would not give up until the season-closing round in Abu Dhabi: "It's as big as it's been all season so I've got a lot of work ahead of me but anything can happen in this sport." Rosberg was aware of his situation in the title battle and was confident of achieving a strong result: "I'm focused on taking the maximum points possible in the remaining seven races and I know the team is too, starting with a top result this weekend."

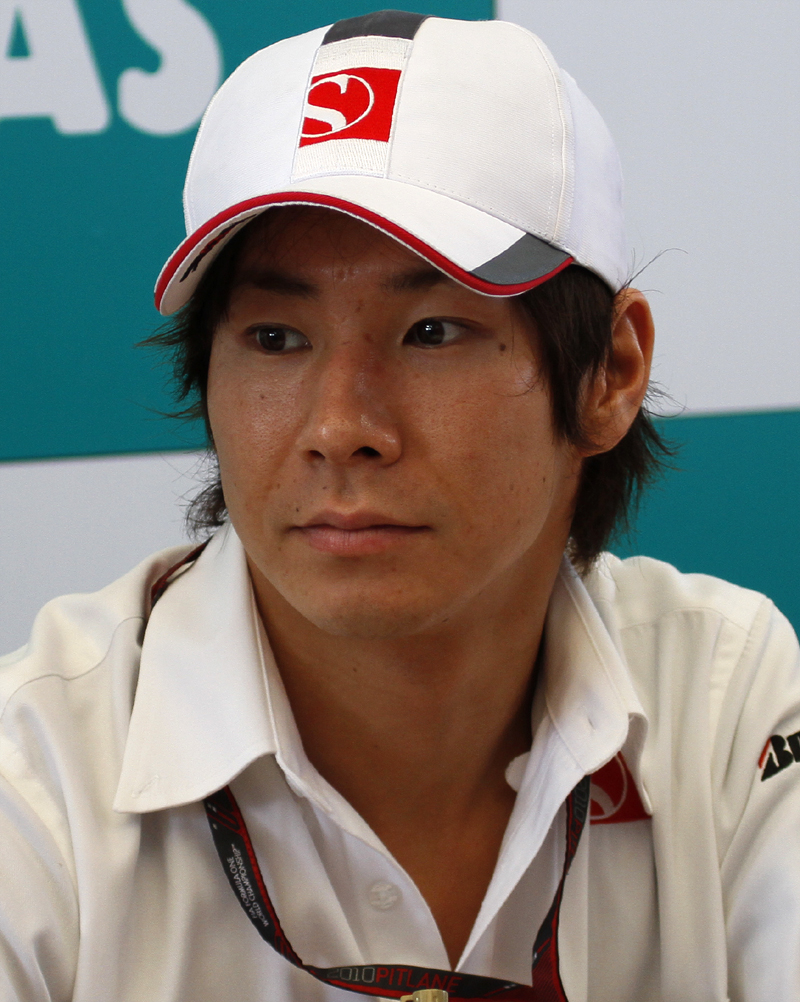
Kamui Kobayashi (pictured in 2010) returned to Caterham after missing the Belgian Grand Prix.

The Parabolica corner was altered ahead of the race. A large portion of its gravel trap was replaced with asphalt, reportedly for a possible return of the Superbike World Championship in 2015 after series officials raised concerns about a lack of run-off areas on the circuit. The change was heavily criticised by the sport's fan base on social media and certain drivers who felt it removed part of the challenge from Parabolica. The Fédération Internationale de l'Automobile (FIA) race director Charlie Whiting, defended the changes, saying drivers and the FIA asked for changes to be made for safety reasons but acknowledged that the corner might not provide as much of a challenge than before. Others joined in Whiting's defence, including Romain Grosjean, who believed the gravel trap's removal would allow drivers to find their limit quicker because of a lack of fear of a major accident.

A total of 11 teams (each representing a different constructor) each fielded two race drivers for the event with one driver change and four free practice participants. Having driven in one of the two Caterham cars in lieu of regular driver Kamui Kobayashi at the preceding Belgian Grand Prix, three-time 24 Hours of Le Mans winner and 2011 Formula Nippon champion André Lotterer was replaced by Kobayashi. Lotterer planned to race at Monza but did not do so after Caterham team principal Colin Kolles ran Formula Renault 3.5 Series driver Roberto Merhi in the first practice session. He told the press that he needed the maximum amount of driving time because he was a rookie. Kobayashi said he was looking forward to testing an updated CT05 car and did not doubt the team's decision to change drivers. Lotus reserve driver Charles Pic replaced Grosjean for the first free practice session for the first time in 2014. Deutsche Tourenwagen Masters driver Daniel Juncadella used Pérez's Force India vehicle for the session's first half-hour, and Giedo van der Garde drove Adrian Sutil's Sauber car.

== Practice ==
Per the regulations for the 2014 season, three practice sessions were held, two 90-minute sessions on Friday and one 60-minute session on Saturday. In the first session, which took place in dry and sunny weather on Friday morning, Hamilton was fastest with a time of 1:26.187, six-tenths of a second faster than Jenson Button in second, who was fastest until Hamilton's lap, and Rosberg third. Alonso, Kevin Magnussen, Vettel, Kimi Räikkönen, Sergio Pérez, Daniil Kvyat and Nico Hülkenberg occupied positions four to ten. During the session several drivers noted the hard compound tyres took longer than anticipated to reach their optimum working temperature, and some went off the track while acquainting themselves with a low-downforce set-up. Ricciardo had DRS trouble and his session ended early when he entered the pit lane with a suspected energy recovery system problem, and Magnussen had rear-braking issues.

Rosberg set the fastest lap of the second session later in the afternoon at 1:26.225; Hamilton was 0.061 seconds behind in second despite electrical repairs taking an hour in the garage, with Räikkönen third. His teammate Alonso was fourth-fastest, with Bottas fifth and Button sixth. Vettel (who ran wide at Parabolica corner on his fastest lap), Magnussen, Massa and Ricciardo followed in the top ten. Multiple drivers went off the track during the session. The Lotus duo of Grosjean and Maldonado struggled to generate heat into their tyres and had further difficulty with braking stability and steering. In the third session, which was held in warmer and sunnier weather on Saturday morning, Hamilton set the fastest lap of the weekend so far of 1:25.519, ahead of Alonso in second and the Williams duo of Bottas and third and fourth. Button, Vettel, Räikkonen, Kvyat, Ricciardo and Hülkenberg were in positions five to ten. Reoccurring gearbox problems forced Rosberg to abandon his short run programme early.

== Qualifying ==
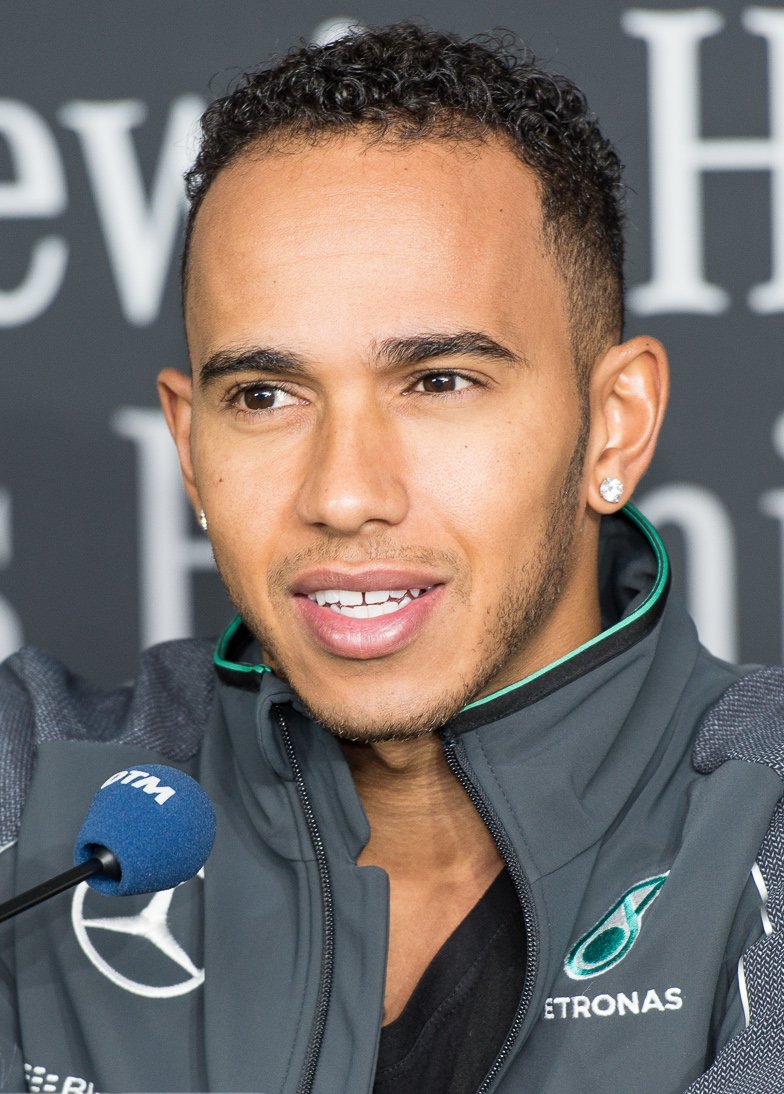
Lewis Hamilton had the 36th pole position of his career, and took his sixth victory of the season the following day.

Saturday afternoon's qualifying session was divided into three parts. The first part ran for 18 minutes, eliminating cars that finished 17th or below. The 107% rule was in effect, requiring drivers to reach a time within 107 per cent of the quickest lap to qualify. The second session lasted 15 minutes, eliminating cars that finished 11th to 16th. The final part ran for 12 minutes and determined pole position to tenth. Cars that qualified for the final session had to start the race on the tyre they set their quickest lap times in the second session. Qualifying took place in warm weather. Hamilton was fastest in all three sessions to claim his fifth pole position of the season, the 36th of his career, and his first since the Spanish Grand Prix with a lap of 1:24.109. He was joined on the grid's front row by Rosberg (using a repaired gearbox) who had improved on his first timed lap, but an oversteer through the Ascari chicane prevented him from achieving pole position. The two Williams duo of Bottas and Massa were third and fourth; both drivers could not improve their fastest times on their second attempts. They were ahead of McLaren's Magnussen and Button in fifth and sixth; the latter lost time through the Lesmo corners on his final timed lap. Alonso was slightly slower than Vettel after his first lap, but he improved slightly for seventh. He attributed his pace to recording similar lap times on four sets of tyres. Vettel qualified higher than his teammate Ricciardo for the fourth time in the past six races to secure eighth. Ricciardo started ninth and Pérez took tenth.

Kvyat was the fastest driver not to qualify for the final session; he took a ten-place grid penalty for an overnight engine change, his sixth of the season. Hence, Räikkonen inherited 11th. Räikkonen lacked car grip and locked his front tyres, ending his first timed lap early because cars exiting the pit lane reduced his visibility for the Rettifilo chicane. After preparing for a second lap, he locked his right-front wheel and drove onto a run-off area. Jean-Éric Vergne was 12th with Hülkenberg 13th after traffic slowed his preparation for a lap at Parabolica and felt the car was loose. Sutil had problems driving but gradually improved his car's balance as he drove, and improved on his final lap to secure 14th, ahead of teammate Esteban Gutiérrez, who made a minor error on his final lap. Maldonado failed to advance beyond the first session; his teammate Grosjean did five laps after missing the first 13 minutes as Lotus repaired a fluid leak. Kobayashi slipstreamed his teammate Marcus Ericsson to pass Jules Bianchi for 18th, with Bianchi not improving because he slid sideways through the Ascari chicane and other drivers were faster on the medium compound tyres. His teammate Max Chilton qualified 20th and Ericsson took 22nd; the latter was hindered by a lack of running on the medium tyres following an engine problem in the third practice session.

=== Qualifying classification ===
The fastest lap in each of the three sessions is denoted in bold.

Pos.	No.	Driver	Constructor	Q1	Q2	Q3	Grid
1	44	(United Kingdom) Lewis Hamilton	Mercedes	**1:25.363**	**1:24.560**	**1:24.109**	1
2	6	(Germany) Nico Rosberg	Mercedes	1:25.493	1:24.600	1:24.383	2
3	77	(Finland) Valtteri Bottas	Williams–Mercedes	1:26.012	1:24.858	1:24.697	3
4	19	(Brazil) Felipe Massa	Williams–Mercedes	1:25.528	1:25.046	1:24.865	4
5	20	(Denmark) Kevin Magnussen	McLaren–Mercedes	1:26.337	1:25.973	1:25.314	5
6	22	(United Kingdom) Jenson Button	McLaren–Mercedes	1:26.328	1:25.630	1:25.379	6
7	14	(Spain) Fernando Alonso	Ferrari	1:26.514	1:25.525	1:25.430	7
8	1	(Germany) Sebastian Vettel	Red Bull Racing–Renault	1:26.631	1:25.769	1:25.436	8
9	3	(Australia) Daniel Ricciardo	Red Bull Racing–Renault	1:26.721	1:25.946	1:25.709	9
10	11	(Mexico) Sergio Pérez	Force India-Mercedes	1:26.569	1:25.863	1:25.944	10
11	26	(Russia) Daniil Kvyat	Toro Rosso-Renault	1:26.261	1:26.070	N/A	21^{1}
12	7	(Finland) Kimi Räikkönen	Ferrari	1:26.689	1:26.110	N/A	11
13	25	(France) Jean-Éric Vergne	Toro Rosso-Renault	1:26.140	1:26.157	N/A	12
14	27	(Germany) Nico Hülkenberg	Force India-Mercedes	1:26.371	1:26.279	N/A	13
15	99	(Germany) Adrian Sutil	Sauber-Ferrari	1:27.034	1:26.588	N/A	14
16	21	(Mexico) Esteban Gutiérrez	Sauber-Ferrari	1:26.999	1:26.692	N/A	15
17	13	(Venezuela) Pastor Maldonado	Lotus-Renault	1:27.520	N/A	N/A	16
18	8	(France) Romain Grosjean	Lotus-Renault	1:27.632	N/A	N/A	17
19	10	(Japan) Kamui Kobayashi	Caterham-Renault	1:27.671	N/A	N/A	18
20	17	(France) Jules Bianchi	Marussia-Ferrari	1:27.738	N/A	N/A	19
21	4	(United Kingdom) Max Chilton	Marussia-Ferrari	1:28.247	N/A	N/A	20
22	9	(Sweden) Marcus Ericsson	Caterham-Renault	1:28.562	N/A	N/A	22
107% time: 1:31.338

Notes:

- **^1** – Daniil Kvyat was given a ten-place grid penalty for using his sixth engine of the season.

== Race ==
The weather at the start was dry and sunny, with the air temperature 25 °C (77 °F) and the track temperature from 37 to 42 °C (99 to 108 °F). A right-front wheel cooler fitted to Hamilton's car detached and crunched on the front wing, causing Mercedes to push him to his grid slot following a reconnaissance lap. An inspection by Mercedes found there to be no problems for Hamilton. Unlike previous years when softer tyre compounds were selected, making one pit stops was calculated to be faster than two by around 12 seconds. Ericsson was ordered to begin from the pit lane after being penalised for driving too fast under double waved yellow flag conditions in the third practice session. When the race began from its standing start at 14:00 Central European Summer Time (UTC+02:00), an incorrect mode dropped Hamilton to fourth and moving Rosberg to the lead into the Rettifilo chicane. Wheelspin dropped Bottas to 11th. Magnussen passed Massa on the outside for second going into the Rettifilo chicane. Pérez accelerated faster than Alonso and passed him before Alonso repassed Pérez on the left at Curva Grande corner.

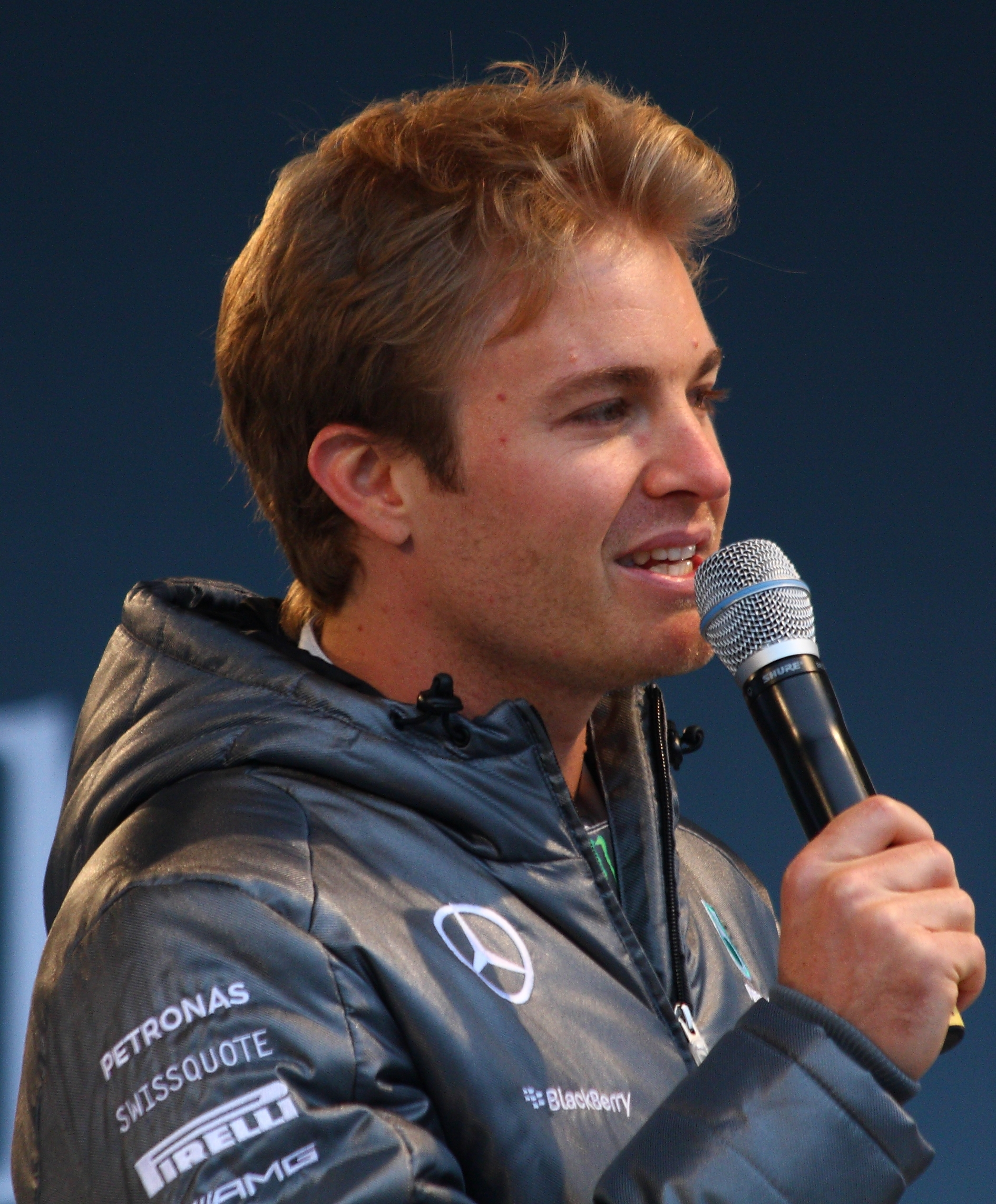
Nico Rosberg led 26 of the first 29 laps before an error put off the track, moving Hamilton into the lead.

Vettel moved to fifth by the end of the first lap but his teammate Ricciardo was put wide onto the chicane's run-off area, dropping four positions over the same distance. Massa attempted to take second from Magnussen by braking later than he did at the start of lap two as Rosberg pulled away from the two. Magnssen went wide at Curva Grande corner and blocked another pass from Massa. DRS was enabled on the next lap and Hamilton used it to attack Massa, allowing Magnussen to pull away from Massa. Magnussen defended but ran deep entering the Rettifilo chicane, allowing Massa to slipstream him into the Variante della Roggia chicane and steered right to claim second place. Magnussen entered the turn off the racing line, spun his tyres on its exit, allowing Hamilton past for third into the first Lesmo corner with better acceleration. Massa and Hamilton pulled away from Magnussen who was being caught by Vettel, Button, Alonso and Pérez.

Hülkenberg lost ninth to Räikkonen on the same lap and Bottas was unable to find the space at Parabolica corner to attempt a pass. Bottas did however overtake Hülkenberg for tenth at the Rettifilo chicane. Chilton entered the Variante della Roggia chicane too fast on lap six, and hit the second set of kerbs at the corner, launching his airborne car into the barrier, ending his race. The safety car was not needed. Rosberg led by almost four seconds by the conclusion of the lap and moved his brake bias towards the front of his car. As Massa went faster Rosberg did the same in response. On the following lap, Rosberg locked his tyres into the Rettifilo chicane at 206 mph (332 km/h), drove onto an escape road and slalomed through obstacles to retain the lead. His advantage over Massa fell to two seconds. Hamilton used DRS to steer left before the Rettifilo chicane and passed Massa for second on the 10th lap.

Hamilton began drawing closer to Rosberg but required a further few laps to pull clear from Massa; he did not attack Rosberg and stayed out of his teammate's slipstream, nursed his tyres and minimised his fuel usage. Bottas overtook Räikkönen for ninth on lap 13; the next lap, he slipstreamed past Pérez on the outside for eighth into the Rettifilo chicane. Bottas overcame Alonso's defence on the outside to take seventh on the main straight during lap 16. Two laps later, Bottas passed Button on his right for sixth. Red Bull elected to bring Vettel into the pit lane at the end of the same lap for hard compound tyres to try and pass Magnussen on pit stop strategy rather than duel Bottas. Pérez followed in response the following lap. Bottas passed Magnussen for fourth at the Rettifilo chicane on lap 21. Magnussen and Alonso made their pit stops on the next lap, rejoining in ninth and 11th, behind Vettel and Pérez separated them. Magnussen slid exiting the Variante della Roggia chicane trying to pass Pérez.

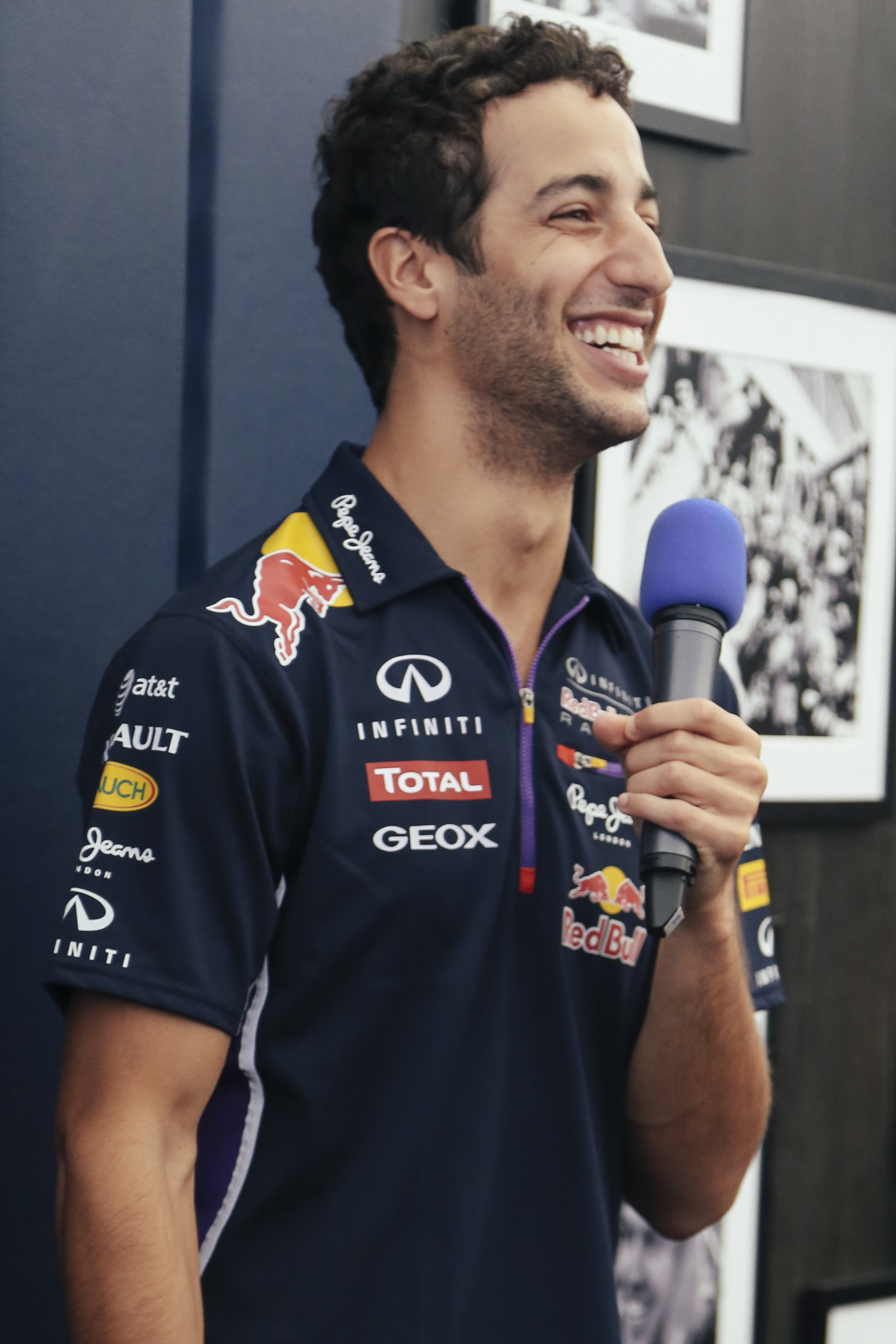
Daniel Ricciardo finished fifth after a late race move up the field.

Massa made his pit stop from third on lap 24, and emerged in fifth. Hamilton received instructions for an engine mode change and Rosberg entered the pit lane from the lead on the next lap and handed the lead to Hamilton. Bottas made his stop on the same lap and rejoined alongside Vettel on the main straight but was forced wide, allowing Magnussen to pass him. Hamilton took his pit stop on the 26th lap and handed back first to teammate Rosberg. Bottas also fell behind Pérez but re-passed the latter going into the Rettifilo chicane. Hamilton's race engineer Peter Bonnington radioed him to stay at least 2.5 seconds behind teammate Rosberg and conserve his tyres for an attack later on. Hamilton was aware from previous experiences earlier in the season that the method to pass a driver was to do so when tyre grip was optimal otherwise it would not have been possible to draw close enough to effect a pass. He recorded the fastest lap at that point to move within seven-tenths of a second of his teammate Rosberg by the start of lap 28, causing debate among Mercedes pit lane staff.

Massa at this point was 12 seconds behind and Bonnington allowed Hamilton to attack earlier than planned. Rosberg's front brake temperatures overheated and his attempt to conserve his rear tyres by moving his brake bias towards the front of his car compromised them. Hamilton used DRS and as Rosberg applied his brakes, he drove onto the Rettifilo chicane's run-off area and slalomed his way past some obstacles, promoting Hamilton to the lead. Alonso's energy recovery system failed, triggering a complete electrical shutdown half a minute later. He stopped at the side of Rettifilo's run-off area to retire for the first time in 2014. Button attempted to pass Pérez into the Rettifilo chicane but the two narrowly avoided contact. Bottas tried to pass Magnussen into the same turn but defensive driving from Magnussen forced Bottas to cut the chicane on lap 31. On the 34th lap, Ricciardo turned right and braked later than Räikkönen for ninth into the Rettifilo chicane.

Hamilton began to pull away from Rosberg, leading his teammate by 4.3 seconds by the start of lap 36. Bottas steered left into the Rettifilo chicane the following lap and Magnussen turned right, causing Bottas to mount a kerb to avoid a collision; Bottas overtook Magnussen. Soon after, the stewards imposed a five-second stop-and-go penalty on Magnussen for putting Bottas off the track in the latter's earlier passing attempt. Button turned right to pass Pérez into the Rettifilo chicane for seventh on lap 39. Pérez then drew alongside Button through the Curva Grande and Variante della Roggia turns. Pérez steered right and was forced wide onto the Curva di Lesmo chicane kerb in passing Button for seventh. On the following lap, Bottas passed Vettel at the Rettifilo chicane for fourth and his teammate Ricciardo overtook Button for seventh at the same turn. Ricciardo caused Pérez to lock his brakes before the Rettifilo chicane and moved lanes to take seventh at the Variante della Roggia chicane on lap 41.

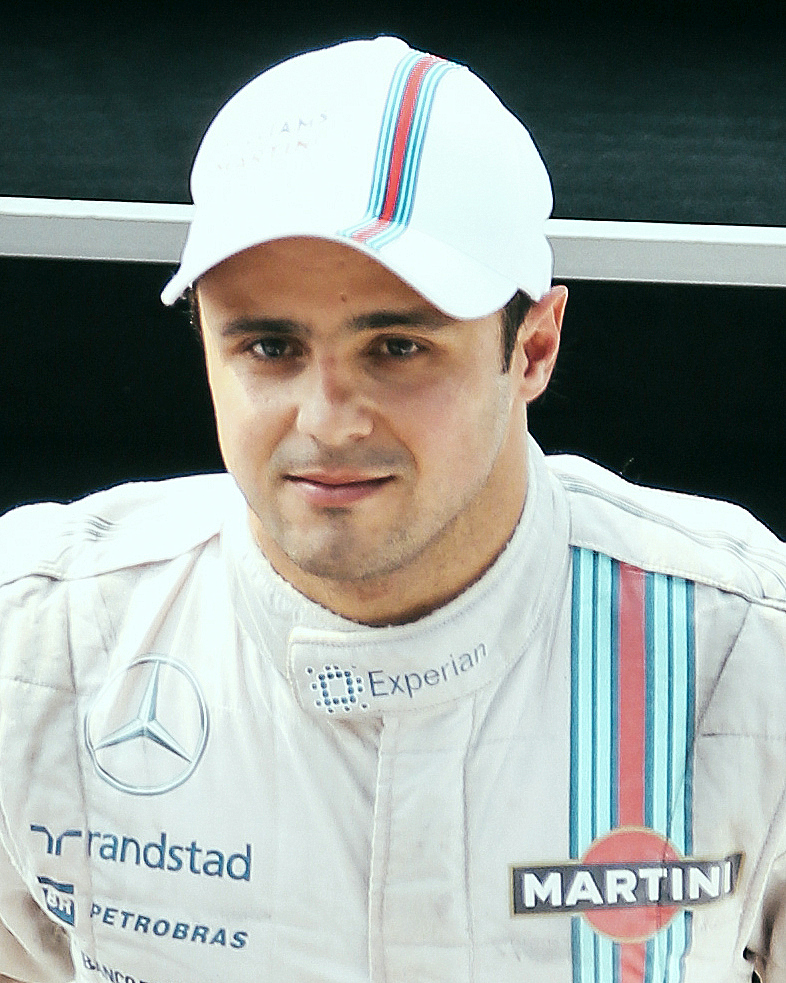
Felipe Massa finished third to secure his first podium result since the 2013 Spanish Grand Prix.

Button passed Pérez at the second attempt into the Rettifilo chicane but had a slow exit after locking his tyres, allowing Pérez to put Button wide into the Variante della Roggia chicane and reclaim eighth. Ricciardo caught and passed Magnussen on his left at the Rettifilo chicane for six on lap 44 despite locking his tyres and drifting sideways. Ricciardo received a message to chase his teammate Vettel, who defended fifth from Ricciardo into the Rettifilo chicane on lap 47 but was slow leaving the turn. Both drivers were alongside through the Curva Grande corner and Ricciardo turned left to pass Vettel for fifth at the Variante della Roggia chicane. Brake problems caused Gutiérrez to hit Grosjean at the Rettifilo chicane on the 51st lap, puncturing Grosjean's right-rear tyre, who slowly drove into the pit lane.

Kvyat's brakes failed on lap 52, causing him to turn left onto the grass at the Rettifilo chicane to avoid hitting Räikkönen, and clipping a polystyrene marker as he rejoined the track. Hamilton won the race by 3.1 seconds over Rosberg. Massa took his first podium result of the season in third, and his first since the 2013 Spanish Grand Prix. Bottas took fourth, ahead of the Red Bull duo of Ricciardo and Vettel in fifth and sixth. Pérez, Button, Räikkönen and Magnussen rounded out the top ten after his five-second time penalty was applied. Kvyat, Hülkenberg, Vergne, Maldonado and Sutil, Kobayashi and Bianchi, Gutiérrez and Ericsson were the final classified finishers. It was Hamilton's sixth victory of 2014 and the 28th of his career. There were three lead changes in the race; two drivers reached the front of the field. Hamilton led twice for a total of 27 laps, more than any other competitor.

=== Post-race ===
At the podium ceremony following the race, Rosberg was booed by the crowd, repeating a similar incident towards him at the previous race in Belgium for a collision with Hamilton, which was the catalyst for their displeasure. Hamilton told the press he felt uncomfortable with the fans behaving in such a manner: "I've had it here, years and years ago, and it's great personally for me to have such great support, from the Ferrari fans and the Mercedes fans. But when I was up there, it was awkward for me to hear them booing Nico because I just don't like that in sport." Wolff affirmed that booing should not be heard on the podium but acknowledged Formula One is an emotional sport for its fans while also saying: "It's a sport and sport should unite." When asked about the booing in the press conference, Rosberg replied while it was "not nice" he hoped over time the fans would forgive him for his past actions. At the podium interviews, conducted by former Ferrari driver Jean Alesi, Massa said he was happy to finish third and was certain luck was beside him with "a lot more to come."

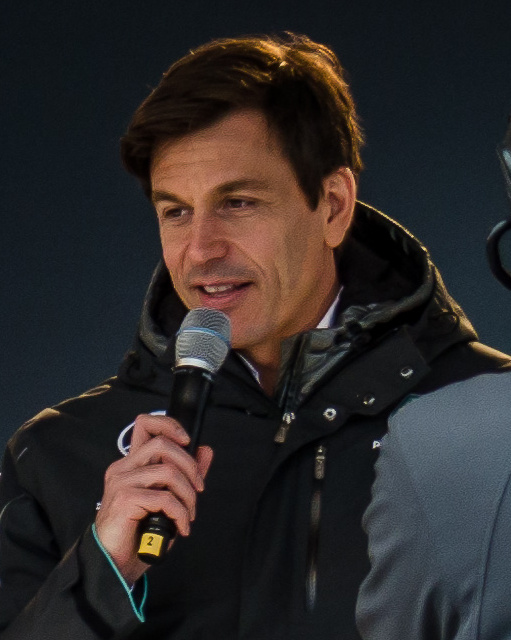
Toto Wolff denied theories that Rosberg's race-lead mistake on the 29th lap was deliberate.

In the hours following the race, conspiracy theories emerged on social media concerning the circumstances of Rosberg losing the lead to Hamilton on lap 29. They suggested the incident was an act of revenge for the collision between Rosberg and Hamilton at the Belgian Grand Prix two weeks prior. Three-time world champion Jackie Stewart said he felt the move was "a bit too easy" and appeared to indicate the error was done purposely: "I thought [Rosberg] could have least made an effort to get round the corner. I first thought 'that's wise', because he knew it wasn't a difficult thing to believe; the second time I thought: 'Hello, what's going on here?'" Wolff denied allegations the mistake was deliberate, suggesting Rosberg was under pressure because of the championship battle but admitted it was uncommon for Rosberg to run wide twice: "Only a paranoid mind could come up with such an idea." Rosberg said Hamilton's fast pace prompted him to push hard and that there was a large probability of flat-spotting a tyre and driving onto the run-off area was the safer option. He stated he learnt about the theory and affirmed there was "no possible reason" for him to purposely drive off the circuit. Television pictures apparently showed Wolff smiling moments after Rosberg's error. Wolff said the broadcast was not live and that the transmission of pit-to-car radio before Rosberg's mistake about him asking Hamilton to slow to preserve his tyres for a late race attack was inaccurate.

The stewards deemed Gutiérrez responsible for hitting Grosjean and imposed a 20-second time penalty on him although they accepted he had brake problems. Gutiérrez said his brake problems had manifested in "an inconsistency that sometimes you cannot predict" and the contact with Grosjean was "an unfortunate moment." Sauber team principal Monisha Kaltenborn deemed the incident "unnecessary" and Grosjean said he was unsure as to what happened with Gutiérrez. Williams performance chief Rob Smedley said the team were investigating Bottas' slow start that lost him positions, which it believed it to be clutch-related problem. Bottas stated he felt he was too assertive with his clutch and his race was hindered by a lack of acceleration leaving the chicane: "The start on the formation lap – when we always do the final checks – was a bit compromised because Lewis had a slow getaway, so that maybe hurt a little bit. But definitely the tyres were not in the optimum window."

Alonso was convinced he could have finished fifth had he not retired, saying he felt quicker than Ricciardo and revealed his team changed their approach, prompting him to slow after his problem emerged. He stated the remainder of the season was "not going to be too different" after a strenuous campaign in the past 12 rounds but that Ferrari was prepared: "It is the way at the moment but we cannot do anymore than this." Bottas said Magnussen's driving was "on the limit" but was unsure whether the latter deserved a penalty. Magnussen was "frustrated" upon receiving his second consecutive time-penalty and stated he would review the incident and carry over lessons into the season's next race. While initial reactions in the United Kingdom disagreed with the stewards decision, Smedley felt the penalty was justified. Red Bull team principal Christian Horner praised Ricciardo's overtakes and called it a strength of his: "For somebody that had a question mark over his overtaking coming into the year, he [has shown it] is right up there with the best."

The result saw Hamilton lower Rosberg's lead in the World Drivers' Championship to 22 championship points, with Ricciardo remaining in third place on 166 championship points. By finishing fourth Bottas passed the non-finishing Alonso for fourth and the latter fell to fifth. Mercedes further extended their advantage in the World Constructors' Championship to lead the second-placed Red Bull by 182 championship points. Williams overtook Ferrari to move into third place and McLaren were with 110 championship points with six races left in the season.

=== Race classification ===
Drivers who scored championship points are denoted in bold.

Pos.	No.	Driver	Constructor	Laps	Time/Retired	Grid	Points
1	44	(United Kingdom) **Lewis Hamilton**	**Mercedes**	53	1:19:10.236	1	25
2	6	(Germany) **Nico Rosberg**	**Mercedes**	53	+3.175	2	18
3	19	(Brazil) **Felipe Massa**	**Williams-Mercedes**	53	+25.026	4	15
4	77	(Finland) **Valtteri Bottas**	**Williams-Mercedes**	53	+40.786	3	12
5	3	(Australia) **Daniel Ricciardo**	**Red Bull Racing–Renault**	53	+50.309	9	10
6	1	(Germany) **Sebastian Vettel**	**Red Bull Racing–Renault**	53	+59.965	8	8
7	11	(Mexico) **Sergio Pérez**	**Force India-Mercedes**	53	+1:02.518	10	6
8	22	(United Kingdom) **Jenson Button**	**McLaren-Mercedes**	53	+1:03.063	6	4
9	7	(Finland) **Kimi Räikkönen**	**Ferrari**	53	+1:03.535	11	2
10^{1}	20	(Denmark) **Kevin Magnussen**	**McLaren-Mercedes**	53	+1:06.171	5	1
11	26	(Russia) Daniil Kvyat	Toro Rosso-Renault	53	+1:11.184	21	
12	27	(Germany) Nico Hülkenberg	Force India-Mercedes	53	+1:12.606	13	
13	25	(France) Jean-Éric Vergne	Toro Rosso-Renault	53	+1:13.093	12	
14	13	(Venezuela) Pastor Maldonado	Lotus-Renault	52	+1 Lap	16	
15	99	(Germany) Adrian Sutil	Sauber-Ferrari	52	+1 Lap	14	
16	8	(France) Romain Grosjean	Lotus-Renault	52	+1 Lap	17	
17	10	(Japan) Kamui Kobayashi	Caterham-Renault	52	+1 Lap	18	
18	17	(France) Jules Bianchi	Marussia-Ferrari	52	+1 Lap	19	
19	9	(Sweden) Marcus Ericsson	Caterham-Renault	51	+2 Laps	PL^{2}	
20^{3}	21	(Mexico) Esteban Gutiérrez	Sauber-Ferrari	51	+2 Laps	15	
Ret	14	(Spain) Fernando Alonso	Ferrari	28	Engine	7	
Ret	4	(United Kingdom) Max Chilton	Marussia-Ferrari	5	Accident	20	

Notes:

- **^1** – Kevin Magnussen had five seconds added to race time for putting Valtteri Bottas off the track.
- **^2** – Marcus Ericsson started from pit lane for yellow flag infringement during the third practice session.
- **^3** – Esteban Gutiérrez had 20 seconds added to race time for causing an avoidable collision with Romain Grosjean.

== Championship standings after the race ==
Drivers' Championship standings

+/–	Pos.	Driver	Points
	1	(Germany) **Nico Rosberg**	238
	2	(United Kingdom) **Lewis Hamilton**	216
	3	(Australia) **Daniel Ricciardo**	166
1	4	(Finland) **Valtteri Bottas**	122
1	5	(Spain) **Fernando Alonso**	121

Constructors' Championship standings

+/–	Pos.	Driver	Points
	1	(Germany) **Mercedes**	454
	2	(Austria) **Red Bull Racing-Renault**	272
1	3	(United Kingdom) **Williams-Mercedes**	177
1	4	(Italy) **Ferrari**	162
	5	(United Kingdom) McLaren-Mercedes	110
Sources:

- Note: Only the top five positions are included for both sets of standings.
- **Bold text** indicates competitors who still had a theoretical chance of becoming World Champion.

== See also ==
- 2014 Monza GP2 Series round
- 2014 Monza GP3 Series round

== Footnotes ==
Previous race: 2014 Belgian Grand Prix	FIA Formula One World Championship; 2014 season	Next race: 2014 Singapore Grand Prix
Previous race: 2013 Italian Grand Prix	Italian Grand Prix	Next race: 2015 Italian Grand Prix
