= Rivervale =

Rivervale may refer to:

== In Australia ==
- Rivervale, Western Australia, a suburb of Perth

== In Singapore ==
- Rivervale, Singapore, a precinct of the district of Sengkang located in north-eastern Singapore

== In the United States ==
- Rivervale, Arkansas, a small town five miles out of Lepanto
- Rivervale, Indiana
- River Vale, New Jersey, a township

== In television ==
- Season 6 Part 1 of Riverdale, which was temporarily renamed Rivervale
  - The parallel universe version of the fictional town of Riverdale in the series
