= Stonnington =

Stonnington may refer to:

- City of Stonnington, a municipality in Melbourne, Australia
- Stonington mansion, a notable house in that city

== See also ==
- Stonington (disambiguation)
