= Lawrenceport, Indiana =

- Census-designated place
- Location within Indiana Location within the United States
- Coordinates: 38°44′56″N 86°23′21″W
- Country: United States
- State: Indiana
- County: Lawrence
- Township: Bono
- Elevation: 627 ft (191 m)
- ZIP code: 47446
- FIPS code: 18-42516
- GNIS feature ID: 2830453

Lawrenceport is a Census-designated place in Bono Township, Lawrence County, Indiana.

== History ==
Lawrenceport was platted in 1837. It was named in honor of Josiah Lawrence, owner of land near the town site. A post office was established at Lawrenceport in 1851, and remained in operation until it was discontinued in 1859.

== Demographics ==
The United States Census Bureau delineated Lawrenceport as a census designated place in the 2022 American Community Survey.
