= Marcus Dudley =

British motorsports engineer

- Citizenship: British
- Occupation: Formula One race engineer
- Employer: Mercedes-AMG Petronas F1
- Title: Senior Race Engineer

Marcus Dudley is a British Formula One engineer. He is currently the senior race engineer for George Russell at the Mercedes-AMG Petronas Formula One team.

== Career ==
Dudley studied mechanical engineering and the University of Leeds. He began his motorsport career in 2006, joining Honda Racing F1 as a Mathematical Modeller. Working within the team's vehicle dynamics and simulation departments, he contributed to computational modelling during a period of rapid technological expansion in Formula One.

Following Honda's withdrawal from the sport at the end of 2008, and the subsequent formation of Brawn GP, Dudley left the team as part of the restructuring that saw significant staff reductions. In 2009, he joined Arden International as a GP2 Performance Engineer. Over his three seasons with the team (2009–2012), he worked on performance optimisation, race-engineering support and data analysis.

Dudley returned to Formula One in January 2012, joining the Marussia F1 Team as a Junior Performance Engineer. The following year, he moved to the Mercedes as a Performance Engineer. He became part of Nico Rosberg’s engineering group for the 2015 and 2016 seasons, winning the World Championship with Rosberg in 2016. Dudley then worked with Valtteri Bottas during the Finn's first two seasons at Mercedes before moving to Lewis Hamilton’s side of the garage for 2019, contributing to championship-winning campaigns in both 2019 and 2020, and standing in for Peter Bonnington at a handful of races. He stayed on Hamilton's side of the garage for the 2021 and 2022 seasons, and in 2023 became race engineer to George Russell.
