= Bono, Lawrence County, Indiana =

Bono, Indiana
- Unincorporated community
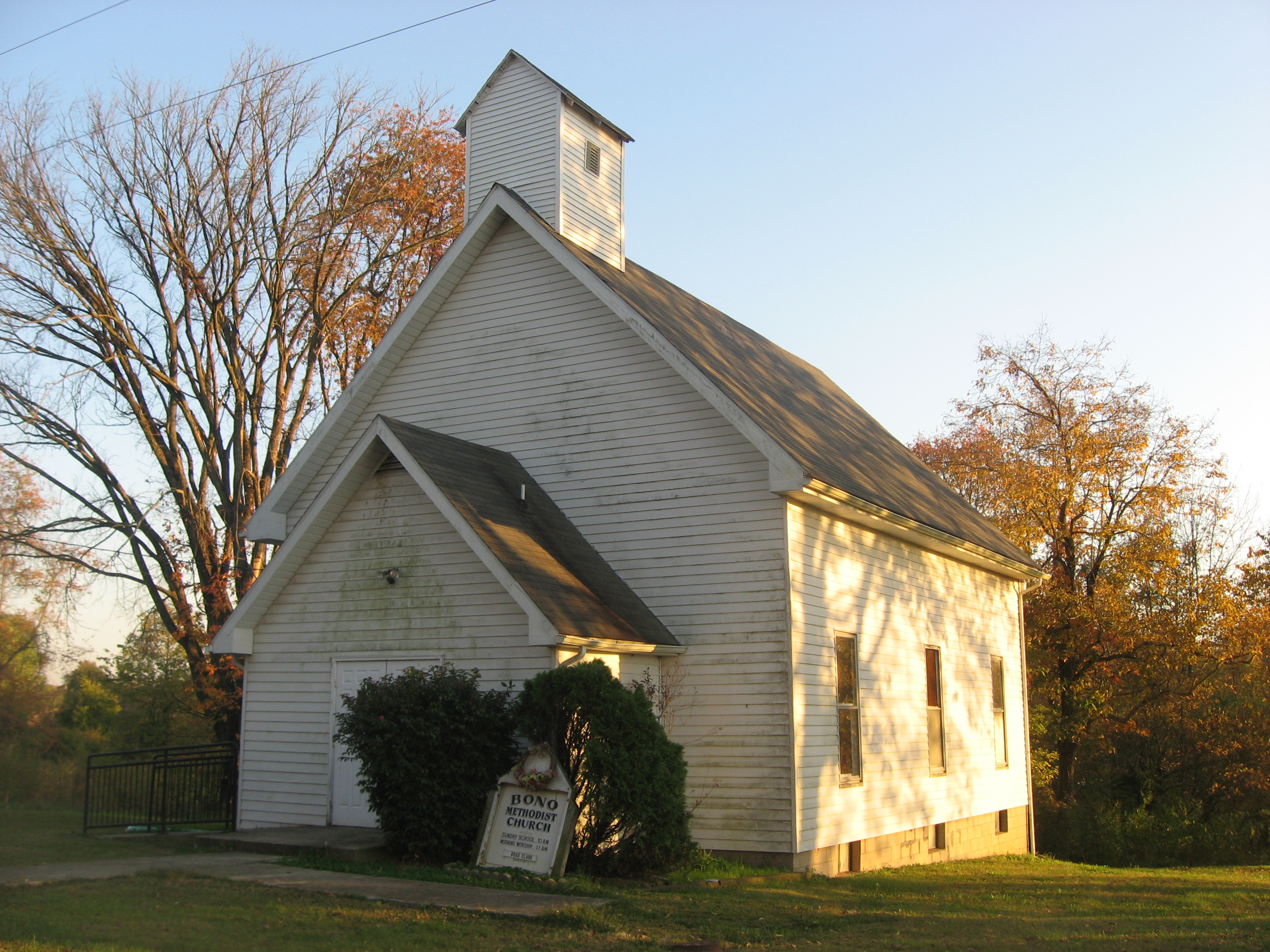
- Bono United Methodist Church, built in 1880

- Location within Indiana Location within the United States
- Coordinates: 38°43′53″N 86°19′16″W
- Country: United States
- State: Indiana
- County: Lawrence
- Township: Bono
- Elevation: 659 ft (201 m)
- ZIP code: 47446
- FIPS code: 18-06418
- GNIS feature ID: 431325

Bono is an unincorporated community in Bono Township, Lawrence County, Indiana.

== History ==
Bono was laid out about 1816, making it the oldest settlement in Lawrence County. Bono was considered to be Indiana's state capital. It was named for Pierre Bono, an early Indiana patriot.
