= Bono Township, Lawrence County, Indiana =

Bono Township
- Township
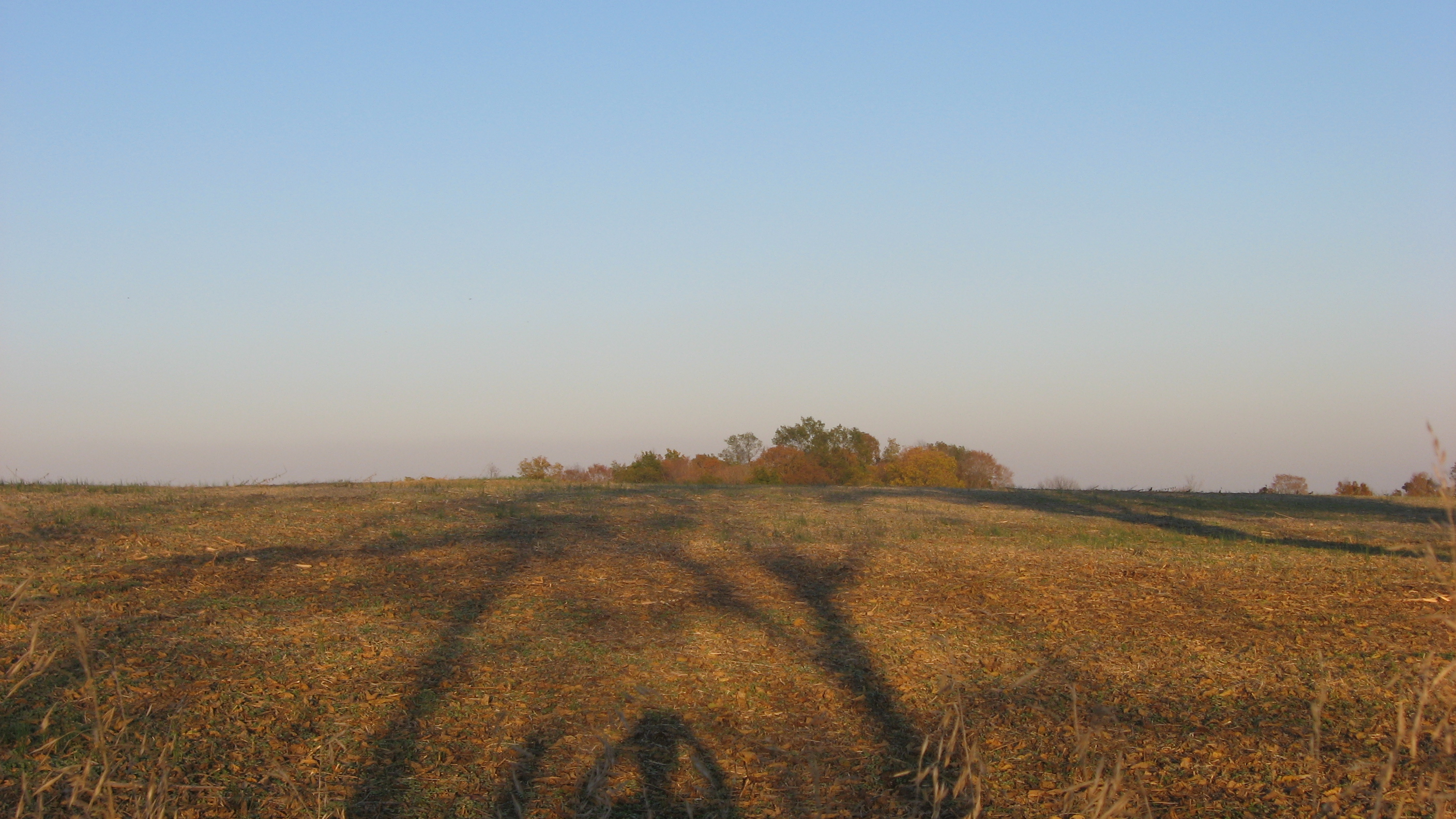
- Countryside in the township

- Location in Lawrence County
- Coordinates: 38°43′19″N 86°21′32″W
- Country: United States
- State: Indiana
- County: Lawrence

Government
  - Type: Indiana township
  - Trustee: Michelle Porter

Area
  - Total: 26.3 sq mi (68 km^{2})
  - Land: 26.06 sq mi (67.5 km^{2})
  - Water: 0.24 sq mi (0.62 km^{2}) 0.91%
- Elevation: 712 ft (217 m)

Population (2020)
  - Total: 743
  - Density: 32/sq mi (12/km^{2})
- ZIP codes: 47446, 47452
- GNIS feature ID: 0453123

Bono Township is one of nine townships in Lawrence County, Indiana, United States. As of the 2010 census, its population was 833 and it contained 393 housing units.

== History ==
The Bono Archaeological Site was listed in the National Register of Historic Places in 1985.

== Geography ==
According to the 2010 census, the township has a total area of 26.3 square miles (68 km^{2}), of which 26.06 square miles (67.5 km^{2}) (or 99.09%) is land and 0.24 square miles (0.62 km^{2}) (or 0.91%) is water.

=== Unincorporated towns ===
- Bono at 38.731443°N 86.321097°W
- Lawrenceport at 38.751164°N 86.387766°W
- Rivervale at 38.768942°N 86.398045°W
- Stonington at 38.731720°N 86.367488°W

=== Cemeteries ===
The township contains Talbott Cemetery.

=== Major highways ===
- Indiana State Road 60

== Demographics ==
Historical population
Census	Pop.	Note	%±
1890	1,021		—
1900	1,060		3.8%
1910	1,095		3.3%
1920	816		−25.5%
1930	795		−2.6%
1940	752		−5.4%
1950	665		−11.6%
1960	692		4.1%
1970	614		−11.3%
1980	721		17.4%
1990	668		−7.4%
2000	803		20.2%
2010	833		3.7%
2020	743		−10.8%

== Education ==
- Mitchell Community Schools

Bono Township residents may obtain a free library card from the Mitchell Community Public Library in Mitchell.

== Political districts ==
- Indiana's 4th congressional district
- State House District 62
- State Senate District 44
