= Rivervale, Indiana =

- Unincorporated community
- Location within Indiana Location within the United States
- Coordinates: 38°46′08″N 86°23′53″W
- Country: United States
- State: Indiana
- County: Lawrence
- Township: Bono
- Elevation: 515 ft (157 m)
- ZIP code: 47446
- FIPS code: 18-64890
- GNIS feature ID: 449719

Rivervale is an unincorporated community in Bono Township, Lawrence County, Indiana.

Rivervale was named from its setting on the East Fork of the White River. It was originally named Scottville.
