= Stonington, Indiana =

- Unincorporated community
- Location within Indiana Location within the United States
- Coordinates: 38°43′54″N 86°22′03″W
- Country: United States
- State: Indiana
- County: Lawrence
- Township: Bono
- Elevation: 705 ft (215 m)
- ZIP code: 47446
- FIPS code: 18-73484
- GNIS feature ID: 444223

Stonington is an unincorporated community in Bono Township, Lawrence County, Indiana.

Stonington took its name from the local Stone Mill.
