= Peter Bonnington =

British engineer (born 1975)

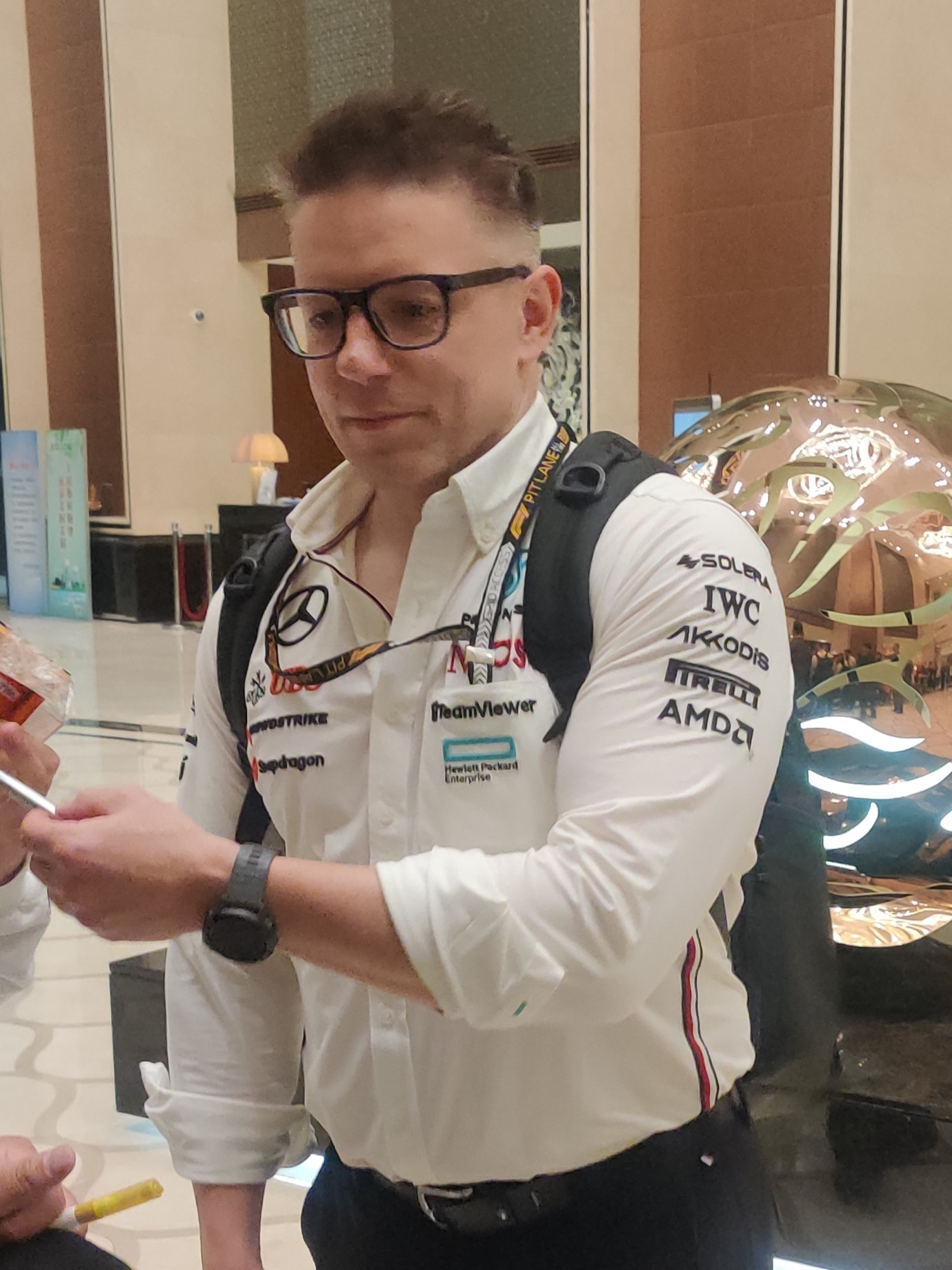
- Bonnington at the 2024 Chinese Grand Prix
- Born: 12 February 1975 (age 51); England
- Other name: Bono
- Occupation: Formula One race engineer
- Years active: 2004–present
- Employer(s): Jordan, Honda, Brawn, Mercedes
- Known for: Formula One engineer
- Title: Head of Race Engineering

Peter Bonnington (born 12 February 1975), also known as Bono, is a British Formula One engineer. Well-known for his time as Lewis Hamilton's and Kimi Antonelli's senior race engineer, he is also the Head of Trackside Performance for the Mercedes AMG Petronas Formula One team.

== Career ==
Bonnington (left) and Kimi Antonelli (middle) at the 2025 Singapore Grand Prix

Bonnington started his Formula 1 career as a data engineer with Jordan Grand Prix in 2004. During his time with the Silverstone team he worked alongside the likes of Giorgio Pantano and Timo Glock. He then joined the Honda team as an understudy to long time race engineer Andrew Shovlin and therefore became Jenson Button’s performance engineer. Bonnington remained with the team as it transitioned into Brawn GP, guiding Button to his maiden World Championship in 2009.

After a stint as Michael Schumacher's performance engineer at Mercedes, he became his race engineer replacing the departing Mark Slade in September 2011. After Schumacher left the Brackley team at the end of 2012, Bonnington became senior race engineer for Lewis Hamilton, a position he remained in until Hamilton left the Mercedes team at the end of the 2024 championship. However, Bonnington did not participate in the 2019 Mexican Grand Prix because he was undergoing a medical procedure. He also missed the 2022 Austrian Grand Prix and his place as Hamilton's race engineer was taken by Marcus Dudley both times. He is now a race engineer for Kimi Antonelli.

In his current role as Head of Trackside Performance, he is responsible for all trackside communications to the driver and the set up of the Formula One car. During his time in this position, he has engineered Button to his single championship, Hamilton to six of his seven championships, and Kimi Antonelli to his championship title.
