= List of actors with more than one Academy Award nomination in the acting categories =

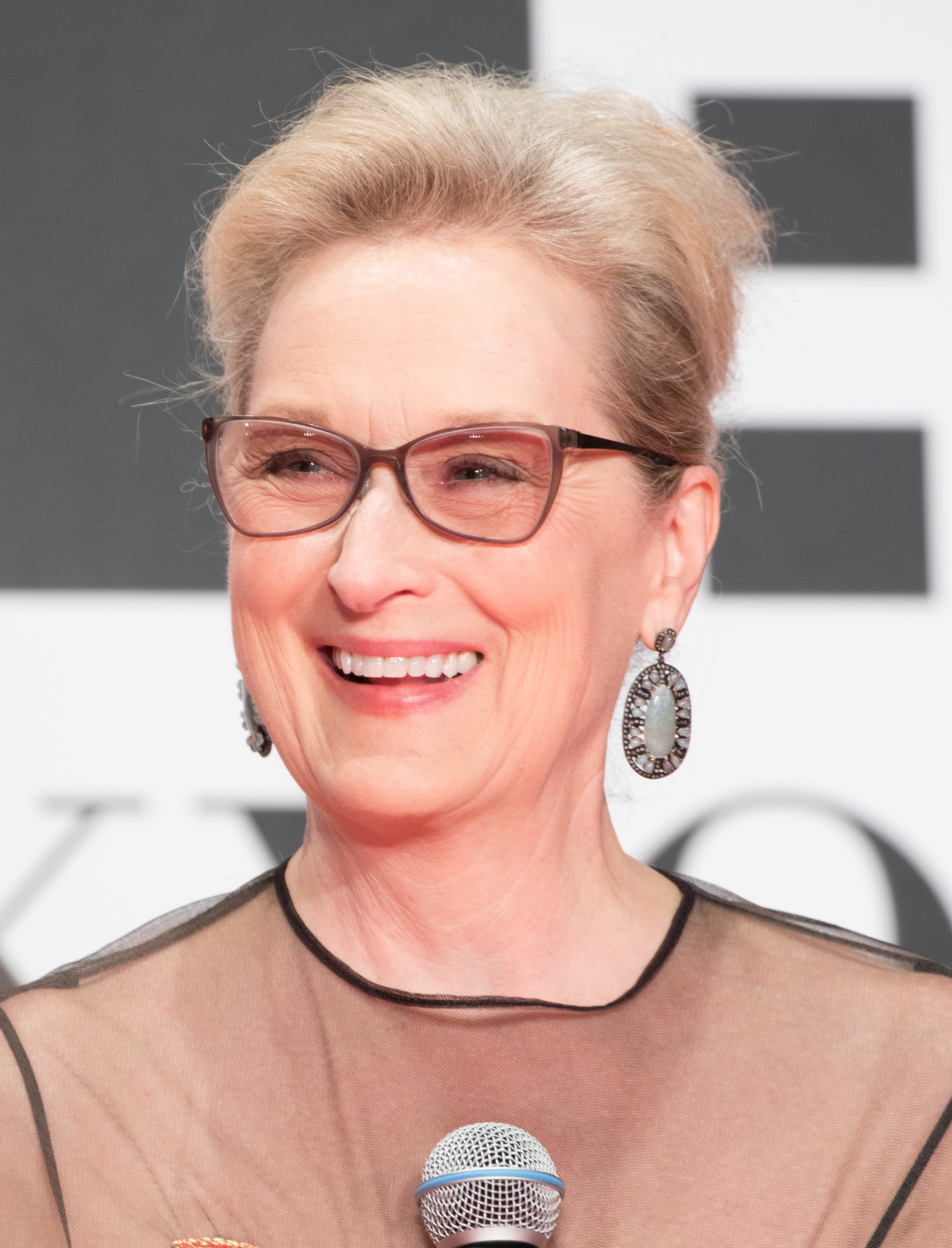
A three-time Oscar winner, Meryl Streep holds the record for the most nominations in the acting categories, with a total of 21.

The Academy of Motion Picture Arts and Sciences (AMPAS) have presented their annual Academy Awards, commonly known as the Oscars, for over 90 years. The Academy Awards for Best Actor and Best Actress have been presented since the 1st ceremony in 1929, and the awards for Best Supporting Actor and Best Supporting Actress have been presented since the 9th ceremony in 1937. Of the 993 Academy Award nominees in an acting category, a total of 366 have received two or more acting nominations, 181 women and 185 men.

A three-time Oscar winner, Meryl Streep is the most nominated performer in the acting categories, with 21 nominations between 1979 and 2018. Streep's total includes a record seventeen best actress nominations. Katharine Hepburn is the secondmost nominated actress with twelve nominations; followed by Bette Davis as thirdmost, with ten total nominations—excluding her eleventh, unofficial write-in campaign (which preceded all ten).^{[A]}

Eight actors have won three or more Oscars in the acting categories, with Hepburn being the only person to win four acting Oscars, spanning from her first in 1934 to her fourth in 1982. Ingrid Bergman and Streep each have two statuettes for leading and one supporting actress win, while Jack Nicholson and Sean Penn nabbed the same tally for male actors. Daniel Day-Lewis became the first and currently only man to win three best actor Oscars, while Frances McDormand became the second woman and third of her counterparts overall to achieve the same. Finally, Walter Brennan won his three supporting actor Oscars every other year between 1937 and 1941.

Thelma Ritter has a record six best supporting actress nominations, albeit without a win. The only women to have won two Oscars in the supporting actress category are Shelley Winters and Dianne Wiest. The seven women to have won in both the lead and supporting actress categories are Bergman, Streep, Helen Hayes, Maggie Smith, Jessica Lange, Cate Blanchett, and Renée Zellweger.

Jack Nicholson is the most nominated male performer in the acting categories with eight for best actor and four for best supporting actor, for a total of twelve nominations and three wins. The record for most best actor nominations is nine, for both Spencer Tracy and Laurence Olivier. With Olivier's one additional supporting actor nod, his total is ten, ranking him secondmost. Along with Tracy, Al Pacino and Paul Newman are among the most nominated overall actors, with nine each. Seven actors have each received four best supporting actor nominations. The seven men to have won in both the lead and supporting actor categories are Jack Lemmon, Robert De Niro, Nicholson, Gene Hackman, Kevin Spacey, Denzel Washington, and Sean Penn.

Peter O'Toole and Glenn Close jointly hold the record for most nominations in the acting categories without a win, with eight; followed by Richard Burton with seven; and Deborah Kerr, Ritter, and Amy Adams with six. O'Toole, Close, and Kerr did receive the Academy Honorary Award.

== Most nominations in four acting categories ==
- Listed below are the 192 actors who have received three or more Academy Award nominations in the acting categories plus the eight actors who have two wins from two nominations.
- BA = Best Actor/Actress Nominations
- BSA = Best Supporting Actor/Actress Nominations

Actor/Actress	BA	BSA	Total	Wins	Winning film(s)
Meryl Streep	17	4	21	3	Kramer vs. Kramer (1979), Sophie's Choice (1982), The Iron Lady (2011)
Katharine Hepburn	12	0	12	4	Morning Glory (1933), Guess Who's Coming to Dinner (1967), The Lion in Winter (1968), On Golden Pond (1981)
Jack Nicholson	8	4	12	3	One Flew over the Cuckoo's Nest (1975), Terms of Endearment (1983), As Good as It Gets (1997)
Bette Davis^{[A]}	11	0	11	2	Dangerous (1935), Jezebel (1938)
Laurence Olivier^{[B]}	9	1	10	1	Hamlet (1948)
Spencer Tracy	9	0	9	2	Captains Courageous (1937), Boys Town (1938)
Denzel Washington^{[C]}	7	2	9	2	Glory (1989), Training Day (2001)
Paul Newman	8	1	9	1	The Color of Money (1986)
Al Pacino	5	4	9	1	Scent of a Woman (1992)
Marlon Brando	7	1	8	2	On the Waterfront (1954), The Godfather (1972)
Jack Lemmon	7	1	8	2	Mister Roberts (1955), Save the Tiger (1973)
Cate Blanchett	5	3	8	2	The Aviator (2004), Blue Jasmine (2013)
Robert De Niro	5	3	8	2	The Godfather Part II (1974), Raging Bull (1980)
Judi Dench	5	3	8	1	Shakespeare in Love (1998)
Geraldine Page	4	4	8	1	The Trip to Bountiful (1985)
Peter O'Toole^{[D]}	8	0	8	0	—
Glenn Close^{[D]}	4	4	8	0	—
Ingrid Bergman	6	1	7	3	Gaslight (1944), Anastasia (1956), Murder on the Orient Express (1974)
Dustin Hoffman	7	0	7	2	Kramer vs. Kramer (1979), Rain Man (1988)
Jane Fonda	6	1	7	2	Klute (1971), Coming Home (1978)
Greer Garson	7	0	7	1	Mrs. Miniver (1942)
Leonardo DiCaprio^{[C]}	6	1	7	1	The Revenant (2015)
Kate Winslet	4	3	7	1	The Reader (2008)
Jeff Bridges	3	4	7	1	Crazy Heart (2009)
Robert Duvall	3	4	7	1	Tender Mercies (1983)
Richard Burton	6	1	7	0	—
Daniel Day-Lewis	6	0	6	3	My Left Foot (1989), There Will Be Blood (2007), Lincoln (2012)
Sean Penn	5	1	6	3	Mystic River (2003), Milk (2008), One Battle After Another (2025)
Frances McDormand^{[G]}	3	3	6	3	Fargo, (1996) Three Billboards Outside Ebbing, Missouri (2017), Nomadland (2020)
Tom Hanks	5	1	6	2	Philadelphia (1993), Forrest Gump (1994)
Jessica Lange	5	1	6	2	Tootsie (1982), Blue Sky (1994)
Michael Caine	4	2	6	2	Hannah and Her Sisters (1986), The Cider House Rules (1999)
Anthony Hopkins	4	2	6	2	The Silence of the Lambs (1991), The Father (2020)
Maggie Smith	2	4	6	2	The Prime of Miss Jean Brodie (1969), California Suite (1978)
Paul Muni^{[A]}^{[E]}	6	0	6	1	The Story of Louis Pasteur (1936)
Sissy Spacek	6	0	6	1	Coal Miner's Daughter (1980)
Ellen Burstyn	5	1	6	1	Alice Doesn't Live Here Anymore (1974)
Vanessa Redgrave	4	2	6	1	Julia (1977)
Deborah Kerr^{[D]}	6	0	6	0	—
Amy Adams	1	5	6	0	—
Thelma Ritter	0	6	6	0	—
Gary Cooper	5	0	5	2	Sergeant York (1941), High Noon (1952)
Fredric March	5	0	5	2	Dr. Jekyll and Mr. Hyde (1931), The Best Years of Our Lives (1946)
Elizabeth Taylor	5	0	5	2	Butterfield 8 (1960), Who's Afraid of Virginia Woolf? (1966)
Olivia de Havilland	4	1	5	2	To Each His Own (1946), The Heiress (1949)
Jodie Foster	3	2	5	2	The Accused (1988), The Silence of the Lambs (1991)
Emma Stone^{[I]}	3	2	5	2	La La Land (2016), Poor Things (2023)
Gene Hackman	2	3	5	2	The French Connection (1971), Unforgiven (1992)
Anne Bancroft	5	0	5	1	The Miracle Worker (1962)
Susan Hayward	5	0	5	1	I Want to Live! (1958)
Audrey Hepburn	5	0	5	1	Roman Holiday (1953)
Shirley MacLaine^{[C]}	5	0	5	1	Terms of Endearment (1983)
Gregory Peck	5	0	5	1	To Kill a Mockingbird (1962)
Susan Sarandon	5	0	5	1	Dead Man Walking (1995)
Norma Shearer^{[F]}	5	0	5	1	The Divorcee (1930)
James Stewart	5	0	5	1	The Philadelphia Story (1941)
Jennifer Jones	4	1	5	1	The Song of Bernadette (1943)
Nicole Kidman	4	1	5	1	The Hours (2002)
Morgan Freeman	3	2	5	1	Million Dollar Baby (2004)
Julianne Moore	3	2	5	1	Still Alice (2014)
Irene Dunne	5	0	5	0	—
Annette Bening	4	1	5	0	—
Bradley Cooper^{[H]}	4	1	5	0	—
Albert Finney	4	1	5	0	—
Michelle Williams	3	2	5	0	—
Arthur Kennedy	1	4	5	0	—
Walter Brennan	0	4	4	3	Come and Get It (1936), Kentucky (1938), The Westerner (1940)
Glenda Jackson	4	0	4	2	Women in Love (1970), A Touch of Class (1973)
Renée Zellweger	3	1	4	2	Cold Mountain (2003), Judy (2019)
Anthony Quinn	2	2	4	2	Viva Zapata! (1952), Lust for Life (1956)
Shelley Winters	1	3	4	2	The Diary of Anne Frank (1959), A Patch of Blue (1965)
Julie Christie	4	0	4	1	Darling (1965)
Diane Keaton	4	0	4	1	Annie Hall (1977)
Burt Lancaster	4	0	4	1	Elmer Gantry (1960)
Joanne Woodward	4	0	4	1	The Three Faces of Eve (1957)
Jane Wyman	4	0	4	1	Johnny Belinda (1948)
Javier Bardem	3	1	4	1	No Country for Old Men (2007)
George Clooney^{[G]}	3	1	4	1	Syriana (2005)
William Hurt	3	1	4	1	Kiss of the Spider Woman (1985)
Jennifer Lawrence	3	1	4	1	Silver Linings Playbook (2012)
Joaquin Phoenix	3	1	4	1	Joker (2019)
Emma Thompson^{[G]}	3	1	4	1	Howards End (1992)
Jon Voight	3	1	4	1	Coming Home (1978)
Robin Williams	3	1	4	1	Good Will Hunting (1997)
Alan Arkin	2	2	4	1	Little Miss Sunshine (2006)
Christian Bale	2	2	4	1	The Fighter (2010)
Penélope Cruz	2	2	4	1	Vicky Cristina Barcelona (2008)
Viola Davis	2	2	4	1	Fences (2016)
Alec Guinness	2	2	4	1	The Bridge on the River Kwai (1957)
Holly Hunter	2	2	4	1	The Piano (1993)
Walter Huston	2	2	4	1	The Treasure of the Sierra Madre (1948)
Ben Kingsley	2	2	4	1	Gandhi (1982)
Helen Mirren	2	2	4	1	The Queen (2006)
Brad Pitt^{[G]}	2	2	4	1	Once Upon a Time in Hollywood (2019)
Julia Roberts	2	2	4	1	Erin Brockovich (2000)
Geoffrey Rush	2	2	4	1	Shine (1996)
George C. Scott	2	2	4	1	Patton (1970)
Kathy Bates	1	3	4	1	Misery (1990)
Philip Seymour Hoffman	1	3	4	1	Capote (2005)
Tommy Lee Jones	1	3	4	1	The Fugitive (1993)
Ethel Barrymore	0	4	4	1	None But the Lonely Heart (1944)
Lee Grant	0	4	4	1	Shampoo (1975)
Maureen Stapleton	0	4	4	1	Reds (1981)
Warren Beatty^{[G]}	4	0	4	0	—
Charles Boyer^{[D]}	4	0	4	0	—
Marsha Mason	4	0	4	0	—
Rosalind Russell^{[D]}	4	0	4	0	—
Barbara Stanwyck^{[D]}	4	0	4	0	—
Montgomery Clift	3	1	4	0	—
Saoirse Ronan	3	1	4	0	—
Jane Alexander	2	2	4	0	—
Mickey Rooney^{[D]}	2	2	4	0	—
Willem Dafoe	1	3	4	0	—
Ed Harris	1	3	4	0	—
Edward Norton	1	3	4	0	—
Agnes Moorehead	0	4	4	0	—
Claude Rains	0	4	4	0	—
Mark Ruffalo	0	4	4	0	—
Sally Field	2	1	3	2	Norma Rae (1979), Places in the Heart (1984)
Melvyn Douglas	1	2	3	2	Hud (1963), Being There (1979)
Jason Robards	0	3	3	2	All the President's Men (1976), Julia (1977)
Peter Ustinov	0	3	3	2	Spartacus (1960), Topkapi (1964)
Dianne Wiest	0	3	3	2	Hannah and Her Sisters (1986), Bullets over Broadway (1994)
Julie Andrews	3	0	3	1	Mary Poppins (1964)
Humphrey Bogart	3	0	3	1	The African Queen (1951)
James Cagney	3	0	3	1	Yankee Doodle Dandy (1942)
Claudette Colbert	3	0	3	1	It Happened One Night (1934)
Ronald Colman^{[F]}	3	0	3	1	A Double Life (1947)
Joan Crawford	3	0	3	1	Mildred Pierce (1945)
Bing Crosby	3	0	3	1	Going My Way (1944)
Russell Crowe	3	0	3	1	Gladiator (2000)
Faye Dunaway	3	0	3	1	Network (1976)
Joan Fontaine	3	0	3	1	Suspicion (1941)
Clark Gable	3	0	3	1	It Happened One Night (1934)
William Holden	3	0	3	1	Stalag 17 (1953)
Charles Laughton	3	0	3	1	The Private Life of Henry VIII (1933)
Gary Oldman	3	0	3	1	Darkest Hour (2017)
Will Smith	3	0	3	1	King Richard (2021)
Charlize Theron	3	0	3	1	Monster (2003)
Jessica Chastain	2	1	3	1	The Eyes of Tammy Faye (2021)
Olivia Colman	2	1	3	1	The Favourite (2018)
José Ferrer	2	1	3	1	Cyrano de Bergerac (1950)
Walter Matthau	2	1	3	1	The Fortune Cookie (1966)
Natalie Portman^{[C]}	2	1	3	1	Black Swan (2010)
Maximilian Schell	2	1	3	1	Judgment at Nuremberg (1961)
Rod Steiger	2	1	3	1	In the Heat of the Night (1967)
Fay Bainter	1	2	3	1	Jezebel (1938)
Laura Dern	1	2	3	1	Marriage Story (2019)
Robert Downey Jr.	1	2	3	1	Oppenheimer (2023)
Wendy Hiller	1	2	3	1	Separate Tables (1958)
Anjelica Huston	1	2	3	1	Prizzi's Honor (1985)
Teresa Wright	1	2	3	1	Mrs. Miniver (1942)
Charles Coburn	0	3	3	1	The More the Merrier (1943)
Benicio del Toro	0	3	3	1	Traffic (2000)
Celeste Holm	0	3	3	1	Gentleman's Agreement (1947)
Martin Landau	0	3	3	1	Ed Wood (1994)
Jack Palance	0	3	3	1	City Slickers (1991)
Joe Pesci	0	3	3	1	Goodfellas (1990)
Christopher Plummer	0	3	3	1	Beginners (2011)
Anne Revere	0	3	3	1	National Velvet (1944)
Octavia Spencer	0	3	3	1	The Help (2011)
Marisa Tomei	0	3	3	1	My Cousin Vinny (1992)
Claire Trevor	0	3	3	1	Key Largo (1948)
Gig Young	0	3	3	1	They Shoot Horses, Don't They? (1969)
Timothée Chalamet^{[C]}	3	0	3	0	—
Johnny Depp	3	0	3	0	—
Kirk Douglas^{[D]}	3	0	3	0	—
Greta Garbo^{[D]}^{[F]}	3	0	3	0	—
Marcello Mastroianni	3	0	3	0	—
Viggo Mortensen	3	0	3	0	—
Carey Mulligan	3	0	3	0	—
Eleanor Parker	3	0	3	0	—
William Powell	3	0	3	0	—
Gloria Swanson	3	0	3	0	—
Debra Winger	3	0	3	0	—
Tom Cruise^{[D]}	2	1	3	0	—
Matt Damon^{[G]}	2	1	3	0	—
Ralph Fiennes	2	1	3	0	—
Ryan Gosling	2	1	3	0	—
Laura Linney	2	1	3	0	—
Nick Nolte	2	1	3	0	—
Michelle Pfeiffer	2	1	3	0	—
Sigourney Weaver	2	1	3	0	—
Natalie Wood	2	1	3	0	—
Joan Allen	1	2	3	0	—
Edith Evans	1	2	3	0	—
Woody Harrelson	1	2	3	0	—
Ethan Hawke	1	2	3	0	—
Piper Laurie	1	2	3	0	—
James Mason	1	2	3	0	—
Clifton Webb	1	2	3	0	—
Charles Bickford	0	3	3	0	—
Gladys Cooper	0	3	3	0	—
Diane Ladd	0	3	3	0	—
Angela Lansbury^{[D]}	0	3	3	0	—
Adrien Brody	2	0	2	2	The Pianist (2002), The Brutalist (2024)
Vivien Leigh	2	0	2	2	Gone with the Wind (1939), A Streetcar Named Desire (1951)
Luise Rainer	2	0	2	2	The Great Ziegfeld (1936), The Good Earth (1937)
Hilary Swank	2	0	2	2	Boys Don't Cry (1999), Million Dollar Baby (2004)
Helen Hayes	1	1	2	2	The Sin of Madelon Claudet (1932), Airport (1970)
Kevin Spacey	1	1	2	2	The Usual Suspects (1995), American Beauty (1999)
Mahershala Ali	0	2	2	2	Moonlight (2016), Green Book (2018)
Christoph Waltz	0	2	2	2	Inglourious Basterds (2009), Django Unchained (2012)

== Most nominations for Best Actor and Best Supporting Actor combined ==
Actor	Total	Wins	Nominated films
Jack Nicholson	12	3	Easy Rider (1969), Five Easy Pieces (1970), The Last Detail (1973), Chinatown (1974), One Flew Over the Cuckoo's Nest (1975), Reds (1981), Terms of Endearment (1983), Prizzi's Honor (1985), Ironweed (1987), A Few Good Men (1992), As Good as It Gets (1997), About Schmidt (2002)
Laurence Olivier	10	1	Wuthering Heights (1939), Rebecca (1940), Henry V (1946), Hamlet (1948), Richard III (1956), The Entertainer (1960), Othello (1965), Sleuth (1972), Marathon Man (1976), The Boys from Brazil (1978)
Spencer Tracy	9	2	San Francisco (1936), Captains Courageous (1937), Boys Town (1938), Father of the Bride (1950), Bad Day at Black Rock (1955), The Old Man and the Sea (1958), Inherit the Wind (1960), Judgment at Nuremberg (1961), Guess Who's Coming to Dinner (1967)
Denzel Washington	9	2	Cry Freedom (1987), Glory (1989), Malcolm X (1992), The Hurricane (1999), Training Day (2001), Flight (2012), Fences (2016), Roman J. Israel, Esq. (2017), The Tragedy of Macbeth (2021)
Paul Newman	9	1	Cat on a Hot Tin Roof (1958), The Hustler (1961), Hud (1963), Cool Hand Luke (1967), Absence of Malice (1981), The Verdict (1982), The Color of Money (1986), Nobody's Fool (1994), Road to Perdition (2002)
Al Pacino	9	1	The Godfather (1972), Serpico (1973), The Godfather Part II (1974), Dog Day Afternoon (1975), ...And Justice for All (1979), Dick Tracy (1990), Glengarry Glen Ross (1992), Scent of a Woman (1992), The Irishman (2019)
Marlon Brando	8	2	A Streetcar Named Desire (1951), Viva Zapata! (1952), Julius Caesar (1953), On the Waterfront (1954), Sayonara (1957), The Godfather (1972), Last Tango in Paris (1973), A Dry White Season (1989)
Robert De Niro	8	2	The Godfather Part II (1974), Taxi Driver (1976), The Deer Hunter (1978), Raging Bull (1980), Awakenings (1990), Cape Fear (1991), Silver Linings Playbook (2012), Killers of the Flower Moon (2023)
Jack Lemmon	8	2	Mister Roberts (1955), Some Like It Hot (1959), The Apartment (1960), Days of Wine and Roses (1962), Save the Tiger (1973), The China Syndrome (1979), Tribute (1980), Missing (1982)
Peter O'Toole	8	0	Lawrence of Arabia (1962), Becket (1964), The Lion in Winter (1968), Goodbye, Mr. Chips (1969), The Ruling Class (1972), The Stunt Man (1980), My Favorite Year (1982), Venus (2006)
Dustin Hoffman	7	2	The Graduate (1967), Midnight Cowboy (1969), Lenny (1974), Kramer vs. Kramer (1979), Tootsie (1982), Rain Man (1988), Wag the Dog (1997)
Jeff Bridges	7	1	The Last Picture Show (1971), Thunderbolt and Lightfoot (1974), Starman (1984), The Contender (2000), Crazy Heart (2009), True Grit (2010), Hell or High Water (2016)
Leonardo DiCaprio	7	1	What's Eating Gilbert Grape (1993), The Aviator (2004), Blood Diamond (2006), The Wolf of Wall Street (2013), The Revenant (2015), Once Upon a Time in Hollywood (2019), One Battle After Another (2025)
Robert Duvall	7	1	The Godfather (1972), Apocalypse Now (1979), The Great Santini (1980), Tender Mercies (1983), The Apostle (1997), A Civil Action (1998), The Judge (2014)
Richard Burton	7	0	My Cousin Rachel (1952), The Robe (1954), Becket (1964), The Spy Who Came in from the Cold (1965), Who's Afraid of Virginia Woolf? (1966), Anne of the Thousand Days (1969), Equus (1977),
Daniel Day-Lewis	6	3	My Left Foot (1989), In the Name of the Father (1993), Gangs of New York (2002), There Will Be Blood (2007), Lincoln (2012), Phantom Thread (2017)
Sean Penn	6	3	Dead Man Walking (1995), Sweet and Lowdown (1999), I Am Sam (2001), Mystic River (2003), Milk (2008), One Battle After Another (2025)
Michael Caine	6	2	Alfie (1966), Sleuth (1972), Educating Rita (1983), Hannah and Her Sisters (1986), The Cider House Rules (1999), The Quiet American (2002)
Tom Hanks	6	2	Big (1988), Philadelphia (1993), Forrest Gump (1994), Saving Private Ryan (1998), Cast Away (2000), A Beautiful Day in the Neighborhood (2019)
Anthony Hopkins	6	2	The Silence of the Lambs (1991), The Remains of the Day (1993), Nixon (1995), Amistad (1997), The Two Popes (2019), The Father (2020)
Paul Muni^{[C]}	6	1	The Valiant (1929), I Am a Fugitive from a Chain Gang (1933), Black Fury (1935)^{[A]}, The Story of Louis Pasteur (1936), The Life of Emile Zola (1937), The Last Angry Man (1959)
Gary Cooper	5	2	Mr. Deeds Goes to Town (1936), Sergeant York (1941), The Pride of the Yankees (1942), For Whom the Bell Tolls (1943), High Noon (1952)
Gene Hackman	5	2	Bonnie and Clyde (1967), I Never Sang for My Father (1970), The French Connection (1971), Mississippi Burning (1988), Unforgiven (1992)
Fredric March	5	2	The Royal Family of Broadway (1930), Dr. Jekyll and Mr. Hyde (1931), A Star Is Born (1937), The Best Years of Our Lives (1946), Death of a Salesman (1951)
Morgan Freeman	5	1	Street Smart (1987), Driving Miss Daisy (1989), The Shawshank Redemption (1994), Million Dollar Baby (2004), Invictus (2009)
Gregory Peck	5	1	The Keys of the Kingdom (1945), The Yearling (1946), Gentleman's Agreement (1947), Twelve O'Clock High (1949), To Kill a Mockingbird (1962)
James Stewart	5	1	Mr. Smith Goes to Washington (1939), The Philadelphia Story (1940), It's a Wonderful Life (1946), Harvey (1950), Anatomy of a Murder (1959)
Bradley Cooper	5	0	Silver Linings Playbook (2012), American Hustle (2013), American Sniper (2014), A Star Is Born (2018), Maestro (2023)
Albert Finney	5	0	Tom Jones (1963), Murder on the Orient Express (1974), The Dresser (1983), Under the Volcano (1984), Erin Brockovich (2000)
Arthur Kennedy	5	0	Champion (1949), Bright Victory (1951), Trial (1955), Peyton Place (1957), Some Came Running (1958)
Walter Brennan	4	3	Come and Get It (1936), Kentucky (1938), The Westerner (1940), Sergeant York (1941)
Anthony Quinn	4	2	Viva Zapata! (1952), Lust for Life (1956), Wild is the Wind (1957), Zorba the Greek (1964)
Alan Arkin	4	1	The Russians Are Coming, the Russians Are Coming (1966), The Heart Is a Lonely Hunter (1968), Little Miss Sunshine (2006), Argo (2012)
Christian Bale	4	1	The Fighter (2010), American Hustle (2013), The Big Short (2015), Vice (2018)
Javier Bardem	4	1	Before Night Falls (2000), No Country for Old Men (2007), Biutiful (2010), Being the Ricardos (2021)
George Clooney	4	1	Syriana (2005), Michael Clayton (2007), Up in the Air (2009), The Descendants (2011)
Alec Guinness	4	1	The Lavender Hill Mob (1951), The Bridge on the River Kwai (1957), Star Wars (1977), Little Dorrit (1988)
Philip Seymour Hoffman	4	1	Capote (2005), Charlie Wilson's War (2007), Doubt (2008), The Master (2012)
William Hurt	4	1	Kiss of the Spider Woman (1985), Children of a Lesser God (1986), Broadcast News (1987), A History of Violence (2005)
Walter Huston	4	1	Dodsworth (1936), The Devil and Daniel Webster (1941), Yankee Doodle Dandy (1942), The Treasure of the Sierra Madre (1948)
Tommy Lee Jones	4	1	JFK (1991), The Fugitive (1993), In the Valley of Elah (2007), Lincoln (2012)
Ben Kingsley	4	1	Gandhi (1982), Bugsy (1991), Sexy Beast (2001), House of Sand and Fog (2003)
Burt Lancaster	4	1	From Here to Eternity (1953), Elmer Gantry (1960), Birdman of Alcatraz (1962), Atlantic City (1980)
Joaquin Phoenix	4	1	Gladiator (2000), Walk the Line (2005), The Master (2012), Joker (2019)
Brad Pitt	4	1	12 Monkeys (1995), The Curious Case of Benjamin Button (2008), Moneyball (2011), Once Upon a Time in Hollywood (2019)
Geoffrey Rush	4	1	Shine (1996), Shakespeare in Love (1998), Quills (2000), The King's Speech (2010)
George C. Scott	4	1	Anatomy of a Murder (1959), The Hustler (1961), Patton (1970), The Hospital (1971)
Jon Voight	4	1	Midnight Cowboy (1969), Coming Home (1978), Runaway Train (1985), Ali (2001)
Robin Williams	4	1	Good Morning, Vietnam (1987), Dead Poets Society (1989), The Fisher King (1991), Good Will Hunting (1997)
Warren Beatty	4	0	Bonnie and Clyde (1967), Heaven Can Wait (1978), Reds (1981), Bugsy (1991)
Charles Boyer	4	0	Conquest (1937), Algiers (1938), Gaslight (1944), Fanny (1961)
Montgomery Clift	4	0	The Search (1948), A Place in the Sun (1951), From Here to Eternity (1953), Judgment at Nuremberg (1961)
Willem Dafoe	4	0	Platoon (1986), Shadow of the Vampire (2000), The Florida Project (2017), At Eternity's Gate (2018)
Ed Harris	4	0	Apollo 13 (1995), The Truman Show (1998), Pollock (2000), The Hours (2002)
Edward Norton	4	0	Primal Fear (1996), American History X (1998), Birdman (2014), A Complete Unknown (2024)
Claude Rains	4	0	Mr. Smith Goes to Washington (1939), Casablanca (1943), Mr. Skeffington (1944), Notorious (1946)
Mickey Rooney	4	0	Babes in Arms (1939), The Human Comedy (1943), The Bold and the Brave (1956), The Black Stallion (1979)
Mark Ruffalo	4	0	The Kids Are All Right (2010), Foxcatcher (2014), Spotlight (2015), Poor Things (2023)
Melvyn Douglas	3	2	Hud (1963), I Never Sang for My Father (1970), Being There (1979)
Jason Robards	3	2	All the President's Men (1976), Julia (1977), Melvin and Howard (1980)
Peter Ustinov	3	2	Quo Vadis (1951), Spartacus (1960), Topkapi (1964)
Humphrey Bogart	3	1	Casablanca (1943), The African Queen (1951), The Caine Mutiny (1954)
James Cagney	3	1	Angels with Dirty Faces (1938), Yankee Doodle Dandy (1942), Love Me or Leave Me (1955)
Charles Coburn	3	1	The Devil and Miss Jones (1941), The More the Merrier (1943), The Green Years (1946)
Ronald Colman	3	1	Bulldog Drummond / Condemned, (1930) Random Harvest (1942), A Double Life (1947)
Bing Crosby	3	1	Going My Way (1944), The Bells of St. Mary's (1945), The Country Girl (1954)
Russell Crowe	3	1	The Insider (1999), Gladiator (2000), A Beautiful Mind (2001)
Benicio del Toro	3	1	Traffic (2000), 21 Grams (2003), One Battle After Another (2025)
Robert Downey Jr.	3	1	Chaplin (1992), Tropic Thunder (2008), Oppenheimer (2023)
Jose Ferrer	3	1	Joan of Arc (1948), Cyrano de Bergerac (1950), Moulin Rouge (1952)
Clark Gable	3	1	It Happened One Night (1934), Mutiny on the Bounty (1935), Gone with the Wind (1939)
William Holden	3	1	Sunset Boulevard (1950), Stalag 17 (1953), Network (1976)
Martin Landau	3	1	Tucker: The Man and His Dream (1988), Crimes and Misdemeanors (1989), Ed Wood (1994)
Charles Laughton	3	1	The Private Life of Henry VIII (1933), Mutiny on the Bounty (1935), Witness for the Prosecution (1957)
Walter Matthau	3	1	The Fortune Cookie (1966), Kotch (1971), The Sunshine Boys (1975)
Gary Oldman	3	1	Tinker Tailor Soldier Spy (2011), Darkest Hour (2017), Mank (2020)
Jack Palance	3	1	Sudden Fear (1952), Shane (1953), City Slickers (1991)
Joe Pesci	3	1	Raging Bull (1980), Goodfellas (1990), The Irishman (2019)
Christopher Plummer	3	1	The Last Station (2009), Beginners (2011), All the Money in the World (2017)
Maximilian Schell	3	1	Judgment at Nuremberg (1961), The Man in the Glass Booth (1975), Julia (1977)
Will Smith	3	1	Ali (2001), The Pursuit of Happyness (2006), King Richard (2021)
Rod Steiger	3	1	On the Waterfront (1954), The Pawnbroker (1965), In the Heat of the Night (1967)
Gig Young	3	1	Come Fill the Cup (1951), Teacher's Pet (1958), They Shoot Horses, Don't They? (1969)
Charles Bickford	3	0	The Song of Bernadette (1943), The Farmer's Daughter (1947), Johnny Belinda (1948)
Timothée Chalamet	3	0	Call Me by Your Name (2017), A Complete Unknown (2024), Marty Supreme (2025)
Tom Cruise	3	0	Born on the Fourth of July (1989), Jerry Maguire (1996), Magnolia (1999)
Matt Damon	3	0	Good Will Hunting (1997), Invictus (2009), The Martian (2015)
Johnny Depp	3	0	Pirates of the Caribbean: The Curse of the Black Pearl (2003), Finding Neverland (2004), Sweeney Todd: The Demon Barber of Fleet Street (2007)
Kirk Douglas	3	0	Champion (1949), The Bad and the Beautiful (1952), Lust for Life (1956)
Ralph Fiennes	3	0	Schindler's List (1993), The English Patient (1996), Conclave (2024)
Ryan Gosling	3	0	Half Nelson (2006), La La Land (2016), Barbie (2023)
Woody Harrelson	3	0	The People vs Larry Flynt (1996), The Messenger (2009), Three Billboards Outside Ebbing, Missouri (2017)
Ethan Hawke	3	0	Training Day (2001), Boyhood (2014), Blue Moon (2025)
James Mason	3	0	A Star Is Born (1954), Georgy Girl (1966), The Verdict (1982)
Marcello Mastroianni	3	0	Divorce Italian Style (1962), A Special Day (1977), Dark Eyes (1987)
Viggo Mortensen	3	0	Eastern Promises (2007), Captain Fantastic (2016), Green Book (2018)
Nick Nolte	3	0	The Prince of Tides (1991), Affliction (1998), Warrior (2011)
William Powell	3	0	The Thin Man (1934), My Man Godfrey (1936), Life with Father (1947)
Clifton Webb	3	0	Laura (1944), The Razor's Edge (1946), Sitting Pretty (1948)
Mahershala Ali	2	2	Moonlight (2016), Green Book (2018)
Adrien Brody	2	2	The Pianist (2002), The Brutalist (2024)
Kevin Spacey	2	2	The Usual Suspects (1995), American Beauty (1999)
Christoph Waltz	2	2	Inglourious Basterds (2009), Django Unchained (2012)
Casey Affleck	2	1	The Assassination of Jesse James by the Coward Robert Ford (2007), Manchester by the Sea (2016)
Wallace Beery	2	1	The Big House (1930), The Champ (1931)
Nicolas Cage	2	1	Leaving Las Vegas (1995), Adaptation (2002)
Robert Donat	2	1	The Citadel (1938), Goodbye, Mr. Chips (1939)
Richard Dreyfuss	2	1	The Goodbye Girl (1977), Mr. Holland's Opus (1995)
Peter Finch	2	1	Sunday Bloody Sunday (1971), Network (1976)
Colin Firth	2	1	A Single Man (2009), The King's Speech (2010)
Henry Fonda	2	1	The Grapes of Wrath (1940), On Golden Pond (1981)
Jamie Foxx	2	1	Collateral (2004), Ray (2004)
John Gielgud	2	1	Becket (1964), Arthur (1981)
Hugh Griffith	2	1	Ben-Hur (1959), Tom Jones (1963)
Edmund Gwenn	2	1	Miracle on 34th Street (1947), Mister 880 (1950)
Rex Harrison	2	1	Cleopatra (1963), My Fair Lady (1964)
Daniel Kaluuya	2	1	Get Out (2017), Judas and the Black Messiah (2020)
Heath Ledger	2	1	Brokeback Mountain (2005), The Dark Knight (2008)
Karl Malden	2	1	A Streetcar Named Desire (1951), On the Waterfront (1954)
Victor McLaglen	2	1	The Informer (1935), The Quiet Man (1952)
Thomas Mitchell	2	1	The Hurricane (1937), Stagecoach (1939)
Edmond O'Brien	2	1	The Barefoot Contessa (1954), Seven Days in May (1964)
Sidney Poitier	2	1	The Defiant Ones (1958), Lilies of the Field (1963)
Eddie Redmayne	2	1	The Theory of Everything (2014), The Danish Girl (2015)
Sam Rockwell	2	1	Three Billboards Outside Ebbing, Missouri (2017), Vice (2018)
Paul Scofield	2	1	A Man for All Seasons (1966), Quiz Show (1994)
J. K. Simmons	2	1	Whiplash (2014), Being the Ricardos (2021)
Frank Sinatra	2	1	From Here to Eternity (1953), The Man with the Golden Arm (1955)
Christopher Walken	2	1	The Deer Hunter (1978), Catch Me If You Can (2002)
John Wayne	2	1	Sands of Iwo Jima (1949), True Grit (1969)
Eddie Albert	2	0	Roman Holiday (1953), The Heartbreak Kid (1972)
Kenneth Branagh	2	0	Henry V (1989), My Week with Marilyn (2011)
Charlie Chaplin^{[J]}	2	0	The Circus (1928), The Great Dictator (1940)
Lee J. Cobb	2	0	On the Waterfront (1954), The Brothers Karamazov (1958)
Tom Courtenay	2	0	Doctor Zhivago (1965), The Dresser (1983)
Benedict Cumberbatch	2	0	The Imitation Game (2014), The Power of the Dog (2021)
James Dean	2	0	East of Eden (1955), Giant (1956)
Bruce Dern	2	0	Coming Home (1978), Nebraska (2013)
Colman Domingo	2	0	Rustin (2023), Sing Sing (2024)
Adam Driver	2	0	BlacKkKlansman (2018), Marriage Story (2019)
Charles Durning	2	0	The Best Little Whorehouse in Texas (1982), To Be or Not to Be (1983)
Clint Eastwood^{[G]}	2	0	Unforgiven (1992), Million Dollar Baby (2004)
Peter Falk	2	0	Murder, Inc. (1960), Pocketful of Miracles (1961)
Richard Farnsworth	2	0	Comes a Horseman (1978), The Straight Story (1999)
Michael Fassbender	2	0	12 Years a Slave (2013), Steve Jobs (2015)
Vincent Gardenia	2	0	Bang the Drum Slowly (1973), Moonstruck (1987)
Andrew Garfield	2	0	Hacksaw Ridge (2016), Tick, Tick... Boom! (2021)
John Garfield	2	0	Four Daughters (1938), Body and Soul (1947)
Paul Giamatti	2	0	Cinderella Man (2005), The Holdovers (2023)
Cary Grant	2	0	Penny Serenade (1941), None but the Lonely Heart (1944)
Richard Harris	2	0	This Sporting Life (1963), The Field (1990)
Jonah Hill	2	0	Moneyball (2011), The Wolf of Wall Street (2013)
Judd Hirsch	2	0	Ordinary People (1980), The Fabelmans (2022)
Djimon Hounsou	2	0	In America (2003), Blood Diamond (2006)
Leslie Howard	2	0	Berkeley Square (1933), Pygmalion (1938)
John Hurt	2	0	Midnight Express (1978) The Elephant Man (1980)
Richard Jenkins	2	0	The Visitor (2008), The Shape of Water (2017)
Cecil Kellaway	2	0	The Luck of the Irish (1948), Guess Who's Coming to Dinner (1967)
Jude Law	2	0	The Talented Mr. Ripley (1999), Cold Mountain (2003)
John Lithgow	2	0	The World According to Garp (1982), Terms of Endearment (1983)
John Malkovich	2	0	Places in the Heart (1984), In the Line of Fire (1993)
Ian McKellen	2	0	Gods and Monsters (1998), The Lord of the Rings: The Fellowship of the Ring (2001)
Burgess Meredith	2	0	The Day of the Locust (1975), Rocky (1976)
Sal Mineo	2	0	Rebel Without a Cause (1955), Exodus (1960)
Robert Montgomery	2	0	Night Must Fall (1937), Here Comes Mr. Jordan (1941)
Frank Morgan	2	0	The Affairs of Cellini (1934), Tortilla Flat (1942)
J. Carrol Naish	2	0	Sahara (1943), A Medal for Benny (1945)
Arthur O'Connell	2	0	Picnic (1955), Anatomy of a Murder (1959)
Walter Pidgeon	2	0	Mrs. Miniver (1942), Madame Curie (1943)
Basil Rathbone	2	0	Romeo and Juliet (1936), If I Were King (1938)
Jeremy Renner	2	0	The Hurt Locker (2009), The Town (2010)
Ralph Richardson	2	0	The Heiress (1949), Greystoke: The Legend of Tarzan, Lord of the Apes (1984)
Roy Scheider	2	0	The French Connection (1971), All That Jazz (1979)
Peter Sellers	2	0	Dr. Strangelove or: How I Learned to Stop Worrying and Love the Bomb (1964), Being There (1979)
Michael Shannon	2	0	Revolutionary Road (2008), Nocturnal Animals (2016)
Sylvester Stallone	2	0	Rocky (1976), Creed (2015)
Akim Tamiroff	2	0	The General Died at Dawn (1936), For Whom the Bell Tolls (1943)
Billy Bob Thornton	2	0	Sling Blade (1996), A Simple Plan (1998)
John Travolta	2	0	Saturday Night Fever (1977), Pulp Fiction (1994)
Max von Sydow	2	0	Pelle the Conqueror (1988), Extremely Loud and Incredibly Close (2011)
Jack Warden	2	0	Shampoo (1975), Heaven Can Wait (1978)
James Whitmore	2	0	Battleground (1949), Give 'em Hell, Harry! (1975)
Tom Wilkinson	2	0	In the Bedroom (2001), Michael Clayton (2007)
James Woods	2	0	Salvador (1986), Ghosts of Mississippi (1996)
Monty Woolley	2	0	The Pied Piper (1942), Since You Went Away (1944)

== Most nominations for Best Actress and Best Supporting Actress combined ==
Actress	Total	Wins	Nominated films
Meryl Streep	21	3	The Deer Hunter (1978), Kramer vs. Kramer (1979), The French Lieutenant's Woman (1981), Sophie's Choice (1982), Silkwood (1983), Out of Africa (1985), Ironweed (1987), A Cry in the Dark (1988), Postcards from the Edge (1990), The Bridges of Madison County (1995), One True Thing (1998), Music of the Heart (1999), Adaptation (2002), The Devil Wears Prada (2006), Doubt (2008), Julie and Julia (2009), The Iron Lady (2011), August: Osage County (2013), Into the Woods (2014), Florence Foster Jenkins (2016), The Post (2017)
Katharine Hepburn	12	4	Morning Glory (1933), Alice Adams (1935), The Philadelphia Story (1940), Woman of the Year (1942), The African Queen (1951), Summertime (1955), The Rainmaker (1956), Suddenly, Last Summer (1959), Long Day's Journey into Night (1962), Guess Who's Coming to Dinner (1967), The Lion in Winter (1968), On Golden Pond (1981)
Bette Davis	11	2	Of Human Bondage (1934),^{[A]} Dangerous (1935), Jezebel (1938), Dark Victory (1939), The Letter (1940), The Little Foxes (1941) Now, Voyager (1942), Mr. Skeffington (1944), All About Eve (1950), The Star (1952), Whatever Happened to Baby Jane? (1962)
Cate Blanchett	8	2	Elizabeth (1998), The Aviator (2004), Notes on a Scandal (2006), I'm Not There (2007), Elizabeth: The Golden Age (2007), Blue Jasmine (2013), Carol (2015), Tár (2022)
Judi Dench	8	1	Mrs Brown (1997), Shakespeare in Love (1998), Chocolat (2000), Iris (2001), Mrs Henderson Presents (2005), Notes on a Scandal (2006), Philomena (2013), Belfast (2021)
Geraldine Page	8	1	Hondo (1953), Summer and Smoke (1961), Sweet Bird of Youth (1962), You're a Big Boy Now (1966), Pete 'n' Tillie (1972), Interiors (1978), The Pope of Greenwich Village (1984), The Trip to Bountiful (1985)
Glenn Close	8	0	The World According to Garp (1982), The Big Chill (1983), The Natural (1984), Fatal Attraction (1987), Dangerous Liaisons (1988), Albert Nobbs (2011), The Wife (2018), Hillbilly Elegy (2020)
Ingrid Bergman	7	3	For Whom the Bell Tolls (1943), Gaslight (1944), The Bells of St. Mary's (1945), Joan of Arc (1948), Anastasia (1956), Murder on the Orient Express (1974), Autumn Sonata (1978)
Jane Fonda	7	2	They Shoot Horses, Don't They? (1969), Klute (1971), Julia (1977), Coming Home (1978), The China Syndrome (1979), On Golden Pond (1981), The Morning After (1986)
Greer Garson	7	1	Goodbye, Mr. Chips (1939), Blossoms in the Dust (1941), Mrs. Miniver (1942), Madame Curie (1943), Mrs. Parkington (1944), The Valley of Decision (1945), Sunrise at Campobello (1960)
Kate Winslet	7	1	Sense and Sensibility (1995), Titanic (1997), Iris (2001), Eternal Sunshine of the Spotless Mind (2004), Little Children (2006), The Reader (2008), Steve Jobs (2015)
Frances McDormand	6	3	Mississippi Burning (1988), Fargo (1996), Almost Famous (2000), North Country (2005), Three Billboards Outside Ebbing, Missouri (2017), Nomadland (2020)
Jessica Lange	6	2	Tootsie (1982), Frances (1982), Country (1984), Sweet Dreams (1985), Music Box (1989), Blue Sky (1994)
Maggie Smith	6	2	Othello (1965), The Prime of Miss Jean Brodie (1969), Travels with My Aunt (1972), California Suite (1978), A Room with a View (1986), Gosford Park (2001)
Ellen Burstyn	6	1	The Last Picture Show (1971), The Exorcist (1973), Alice Doesn't Live Here Anymore (1974), Same Time, Next Year (1978), Resurrection (1980), Requiem for a Dream (2000)
Vanessa Redgrave	6	1	Morgan: A Suitable Case for Treatment (1966), Isadora (1968), Mary, Queen of Scots (1971), Julia (1977), The Bostonians (1984), Howards End (1992)
Sissy Spacek	6	1	Carrie (1976), Coal Miner's Daughter (1980), Missing (1982), The River (1984), Crimes of the Heart (1986), In the Bedroom (2001)
Amy Adams	6	0	Junebug (2005), Doubt (2008), The Fighter (2010), The Master (2012), American Hustle (2013), Vice (2018)
Deborah Kerr	6	0	Edward, My Son (1949), From Here to Eternity (1953), The King and I (1956), Heaven Knows, Mr Allison (1957), Separate Tables (1958), The Sundowners (1960)
Thelma Ritter	6	0	All About Eve (1950), The Mating Season (1951), With a Song in My Heart (1952), Pickup on South Street (1953), Pillow Talk (1959), Birdman of Alcatraz (1962)
Jodie Foster	5	2	Taxi Driver (1976), The Accused (1988), The Silence of the Lambs (1991), Nell (1994), Nyad (2023)
Olivia de Havilland	5	2	Gone with the Wind (1939), Hold Back the Dawn (1941), To Each His Own (1946), The Snake Pit (1948), The Heiress (1949)
Emma Stone	5	2	Birdman (2014), La La Land (2016), The Favourite (2018), Poor Things (2023), Bugonia (2025)
Elizabeth Taylor	5	2	Raintree County (1957), Cat on a Hot Tin Roof (1958), Suddenly, Last Summer (1959), BUtterfield 8 (1960), Who's Afraid of Virginia Woolf? (1966)
Anne Bancroft	5	1	The Miracle Worker (1962), The Pumpkin Eater (1964), The Graduate (1967), The Turning Point (1977), Agnes of God (1985)
Susan Hayward	5	1	Smash-Up, the Story of a Woman (1947), My Foolish Heart (1949), With a Song in My Heart (1952), I'll Cry Tomorrow (1955), I Want to Live! (1958)
Audrey Hepburn	5	1	Roman Holiday (1953), Sabrina (1954), The Nun's Story (1959), Breakfast at Tiffany's (1961), Wait Until Dark (1967)
Jennifer Jones	5	1	The Song of Bernadette (1943), Since You Went Away (1944), Love Letters (1945), Duel in the Sun (1946), Love Is a Many-Splendored Thing (1955)
Nicole Kidman	5	1	Moulin Rouge! (2001), The Hours (2002), Rabbit Hole (2010), Lion (2016), Being the Ricardos (2021)
Shirley MacLaine	5	1	Some Came Running (1958), The Apartment (1960), Irma la Douce (1963), The Turning Point (1977), Terms of Endearment (1983)
Julianne Moore	5	1	Boogie Nights (1997), The End of the Affair (1999), The Hours (2002), Far From Heaven (2002), Still Alice (2014)
Susan Sarandon	5	1	Atlantic City (1980), Thelma & Louise (1991), Lorenzo's Oil (1992), The Client (1994), Dead Man Walking (1995)
Norma Shearer	5	1	The Divorcee / Their Own Desire (1929/30), A Free Soul (1930/31), The Barretts of Wimpole Street (1934), Romeo and Juliet (1936), Marie Antoinette (1938)
Annette Bening	5	0	The Grifters (1990), American Beauty (1999), Being Julia (2004), The Kids Are All Right (2010), Nyad (2023)
Irene Dunne	5	0	Cimarron (1931), Theodora Goes Wild (1936), The Awful Truth (1937), Love Affair (1939), I Remember Mama (1948)
Michelle Williams	5	0	Brokeback Mountain (2005), Blue Valentine (2010), My Week with Marilyn (2011), Manchester by the Sea (2016), The Fabelmans (2022)
Glenda Jackson	4	2	Women in Love (1970), Sunday Bloody Sunday (1971), A Touch of Class (1973), Hedda (1975)
Shelley Winters	4	2	A Place in the Sun (1951), The Diary of Anne Frank (1959), A Patch of Blue (1965), The Poseidon Adventure (1972)
Renée Zellweger	4	2	Bridget Jones' Diary (2001), Chicago (2002), Cold Mountain (2003), Judy (2019)
Ethel Barrymore	4	1	None But the Lonely Heart (1944), The Spiral Staircase (1946), The Paradine Case (1947), Pinky (1949)
Kathy Bates	4	1	Misery (1990), Primary Colors (1998), About Schmidt (2002), Richard Jewell (2019)
Julie Christie	4	1	Darling (1965), McCabe & Mrs. Miller (1971), Afterglow (1997), Away from Her (2007)
Penelope Cruz	4	1	Volver (2006), Vicky Cristina Barcelona (2008), Nine (2009), Parallel Mothers (2021)
Viola Davis	4	1	Doubt (2008), The Help (2011), Fences (2016), Ma Rainey's Black Bottom (2020)
Lee Grant	4	1	Detective Story (1951), The Landlord (1970), Shampoo (1975), Voyage of the Damned (1976)
Holly Hunter	4	1	Broadcast News (1987), The Firm (1993), The Piano (1993), Thirteen (2003)
Diane Keaton	4	1	Annie Hall (1977), Reds (1981), Marvin's Room (1996), Something's Gotta Give (2003)
Jennifer Lawrence	4	1	Winter's Bone (2010), Silver Linings Playbook (2012), American Hustle (2013), Joy (2015)
Helen Mirren	4	1	The Madness of King George (1994), Gosford Park (2001), The Queen (2006), The Last Station (2009)
Julia Roberts	4	1	Steel Magnolias (1989), Pretty Woman (1990), Erin Brockovich (2000), August: Osage County (2013)
Maureen Stapleton	4	1	Lonelyhearts (1958), Airport (1970), Interiors (1978), Reds (1981)
Emma Thompson	4	1	Howards End (1992), In the Name of the Father (1993), The Remains of the Day (1993), Sense and Sensibility (1995)
Joanne Woodward	4	1	The Three Faces of Eve (1957), Rachel, Rachel (1968), Summer Wishes, Winter Dreams (1973), Mr. and Mrs. Bridge (1990)
Jane Wyman	4	1	The Yearling (1946), Johnny Belinda (1948), The Blue Veil (1951), Magnificent Obsession (1954)
Jane Alexander	4	0	The Great White Hope (1970), All the President's Men (1976), Kramer vs. Kramer (1979), Testament (1983)
Marsha Mason	4	0	Cinderella Liberty (1973), The Goodbye Girl (1977), Chapter Two (1979), Only When I Laugh (1981)
Agnes Moorehead	4	0	The Magnificent Ambersons (1942), Mrs. Parkington (1944), Johnny Belinda (1948), Hush... Hush, Sweet Charlotte (1964)
Saoirse Ronan	4	0	Atonement (2007), Brooklyn (2015), Lady Bird (2017), Little Women (2019)
Rosalind Russell	4	0	My Sister Eileen (1942), Sister Kenny (1946), Mourning Becomes Electra (1947), Auntie Mame (1958)
Barbara Stanwyck	4	0	Stella Dallas (1937), Ball of Fire (1941), Double Indemnity (1944), Sorry, Wrong Number (1948)
Sally Field	3	2	Norma Rae (1979), Places in the Heart (1984), Lincoln (2012)
Dianne Wiest	3	2	Hannah and Her Sisters (1986), Parenthood (1989), Bullets over Broadway (1994)
Julie Andrews	3	1	Mary Poppins (1964), The Sound of Music (1965), Victor Victoria (1982)
Fay Bainter	3	1	Jezebel (1938), White Banners (1938), The Children's Hour (1961)
Jessica Chastain	3	1	The Help (2011), Zero Dark Thirty (2012), The Eyes of Tammy Faye (2021)
Claudette Colbert	3	1	It Happened One Night (1934), Private Worlds (1935), Since You Went Away (1944)
Olivia Colman	3	1	The Favourite (2018), The Father (2020), The Lost Daughter (2021)
Joan Crawford	3	1	Mildred Pierce (1945), Possessed (1947), Sudden Fear (1952)
Laura Dern	3	1	Rambling Rose (1991), Wild (2014), Marriage Story (2019)
Faye Dunaway	3	1	Bonnie and Clyde (1967), Chinatown (1974), Network (1976)
Joan Fontaine	3	1	Rebecca (1940), Suspicion (1941), The Constant Nymph (1943)
Wendy Hiller	3	1	Pygmalion (1938), Separate Tables (1958), A Man for All Seasons (1966)
Celeste Holm	3	1	Gentleman's Agreement (1947), Come to the Stable (1949), All About Eve (1950)
Anjelica Huston	3	1	Prizzi's Honor (1985), Enemies, A Love Story (1989), The Grifters (1990)
Natalie Portman	3	1	Closer (2004), Black Swan (2010), Jackie (2016)
Anne Revere	3	1	The Song of Bernadette (1943), National Velvet (1944), Gentleman's Agreement (1947)
Octavia Spencer	3	1	The Help (2011), Hidden Figures (2016), The Shape of Water (2017)
Charlize Theron	3	1	Monster (2003), North Country (2005), Bombshell (2019)
Marisa Tomei	3	1	My Cousin Vinny (1992), In the Bedroom (2001), The Wrestler (2008)
Claire Trevor	3	1	Dead End (1937), Key Largo (1948), The High and the Mighty (1954)
Teresa Wright	3	1	The Little Foxes (1941), Mrs. Miniver (1942), The Pride of the Yankees (1942)
Joan Allen	3	0	Nixon (1995), The Crucible (1996), The Contender (2000)
Gladys Cooper	3	0	Now, Voyager (1942), The Song of Bernadette (1943), My Fair Lady (1964)
Edith Evans	3	0	Tom Jones (1963), The Chalk Garden (1964), The Whisperers (1967)
Greta Garbo	3	0	Anna Christie / Romance (1930), Camille (1936), Ninotchka (1939)
Diane Ladd	3	0	Alice Doesn't Live Here Anymore (1974), Wild at Heart (1990), Rambling Rose (1991)
Angela Lansbury	3	0	Gaslight (1944), The Picture of Dorian Gray (1945), The Manchurian Candidate (1962)
Piper Laurie	3	0	The Hustler (1961), Carrie (1976), Children of a Lesser God (1986)
Laura Linney	3	0	You Can Count on Me (2000), Kinsey (2004), The Savages (2007)
Carey Mulligan	3	0	An Education (2009), Promising Young Woman (2020), Maestro (2023)
Eleanor Parker	3	0	Caged (1950), Detective Story (1951), Interrupted Melody (1955)
Michelle Pfeiffer	3	0	Dangerous Liaisons (1988), The Fabulous Baker Boys (1989), Love Field (1992)
Gloria Swanson	3	0	Sadie Thompson (1928), The Trespasser (1929), Sunset Boulevard (1950)
Sigourney Weaver	3	0	Aliens (1986), Working Girl (1988), Gorillas in the Mist (1988)
Debra Winger	3	0	An Officer and a Gentleman (1982), Terms of Endearment (1983), Shadowlands (1993)
Natalie Wood	3	0	Rebel Without a Cause (1955), Splendor in the Grass (1961), Love with the Proper Stranger (1963)
Helen Hayes	2	2	The Sin of Madelon Claudet (1931/32), Airport (1970)
Vivien Leigh	2	2	Gone with the Wind (1939), A Streetcar Named Desire (1950)
Luise Rainer	2	2	The Great Ziegfeld (1936), The Good Earth (1937)
Hilary Swank	2	2	Boys Don't Cry (1999), Million Dollar Baby (2004)
Anne Baxter	2	1	The Razor's Edge (1946), All About Eve (1950)
Juliette Binoche	2	1	The English Patient (1996), Chocolat (2000)
Alice Brady	2	1	My Man Godfrey (1936), In Old Chicago (1938)
Jessie Buckley	2	1	The Lost Daughter (2021), Hamnet (2025)
Sandra Bullock	2	1	The Blind Side (2009), Gravity (2013)
Cher	2	1	Silkwood (1983), Moonstruck (1987)
Marion Cotillard	2	1	La Vie en Rose (2007), Two Days, One Night (2014)
Geena Davis	2	1	The Accidental Tourist (1988), Thelma & Louise (1991)
Marie Dressler	2	1	Min and Bill (1930/31), Emma (1931/32)
Janet Gaynor	2	1	7th Heaven / Street Angel / Sunrise: A Song of Two Humans (1927/28), A Star Is Born (1937)
Whoopi Goldberg	2	1	The Color Purple (1985), Ghost (1990)
Ruth Gordon	2	1	Inside Daisy Clover (1965), Rosemary's Baby (1968)
Gloria Grahame	2	1	Crossfire (1947), The Bad and the Beautiful (1952)
Marcia Gay Harden	2	1	Pollock (2000), Mystic River (2003)
Anne Hathaway	2	1	Rachel Getting Married (2008), Les Misérables (2012)
Goldie Hawn	2	1	Cactus Flower (1969), Private Benjamin (1980)
Eileen Heckart	2	1	The Bad Seed (1956), Butterflies Are Free (1972)
Helen Hunt	2	1	As Good as It Gets (1997), The Sessions (2012)
Angelina Jolie	2	1	Girl, Interrupted (1999), Changeling (2008)
Grace Kelly	2	1	Mogambo (1953), The Country Girl (1954)
Melissa Leo	2	1	Frozen River (2008), The Fighter (2010)
Sophia Loren	2	1	Two Women (1961), Marriage Italian Style (1964)
Amy Madigan	2	1	Twice in a Lifetime (1985), Weapons (2025)
Anna Magnani	2	1	The Rose Tattoo (1955), Wild Is the Wind (1957)
Mercedes McCambridge	2	1	All the King's Men (1949), Giant (1956)
Liza Minnelli	2	1	The Sterile Cuckoo (1969), Cabaret (1972)
Patricia Neal	2	1	Hud (1963), The Subject Was Roses (1968)
Estelle Parsons	2	1	Bonnie and Clyde (1967), Rachel, Rachel (1968)
Simone Signoret	2	1	Room at the Top (1959), Ship of Fools (1965)
Gale Sondergaard	2	1	Anthony Adverse (1936), Anna and the King of Siam (1946)
Barbra Streisand	2	1	Funny Girl (1968), The Way We Were (1973)
Jessica Tandy	2	1	Driving Miss Daisy (1989), Fried Green Tomatoes (1991)
Rachel Weisz	2	1	The Constant Gardener (2005), The Favourite (2018)
Reese Witherspoon	2	1	Walk the Line (2005), Wild (2014)
Loretta Young	2	1	The Farmer's Daughter (1947), Come to the Stable (1949)
Isabelle Adjani	2	0	The Story of Adele H. (1975), Camille Claudel (1989)
Ann-Margret	2	0	Carnal Knowledge (1971), Tommy (1975)
Angela Bassett	2	0	What's Love Got to Do with It (1993), Black Panther: Wakanda Forever (2022)
Brenda Blethyn	2	0	Secrets & Lies (1996), Little Voice (1998)
Beulah Bondi	2	0	The Gorgeous Hussy (1936), Of Human Hearts (1938)
Helena Bonham Carter	2	0	The Wings of the Dove (1997), The King's Speech (2010)
Dyan Cannon	2	0	Bob & Carol & Ted & Alice (1969), Heaven Can Wait (1978)
Leslie Caron	2	0	Lili (1953), The L-Shaped Room (1962)
Ruth Chatterton^{[C]}	2	0	Madame X (1929), Sarah and Son (1930)
Jill Clayburgh	2	0	An Unmarried Woman (1978), Starting Over (1979)
Joan Cusack	2	0	Working Girl (1988), In & Out (1997)
Judy Davis	2	0	A Passage to India (1984), Husbands and Wives (1992)
Melinda Dillon	2	0	Close Encounters of the Third Kind (1977), Absence of Malice (1981)
Mildred Dunnock	2	0	Death of a Salesman (1951), Baby Doll (1956)
Cynthia Erivo	2	0	Harriet (2019), Wicked (2024)
Judy Garland^{[D]}	2	0	A Star Is Born (1954), Judgment at Nuremberg (1961)
Sally Hawkins	2	0	Blue Jasmine (2013), The Shape of Water (2017)
Kate Hudson	2	0	Almost Famous (2000), Song Sung Blue (2025)
Scarlett Johansson	2	0	Jojo Rabbit (2019), Marriage Story (2019)
Felicity Jones	2	0	The Theory of Everything (2014), The Brutalist (2024)
Madeline Kahn	2	0	Paper Moon (1973), Blazing Saddles (1974)
Catherine Keener	2	0	Being John Malkovich (1999), Capote (2005)
Shirley Knight	2	0	The Dark at the Top of the Stairs (1960), Sweet Bird of Youth (1962)
Keira Knightley	2	0	Pride & Prejudice (2005), The Imitation Game (2014)
Elsa Lanchester	2	0	Come to the Stable (1949), Witness for the Prosecution (1957)
Rooney Mara	2	0	The Girl with the Dragon Tattoo (2011), Carol (2015)
Melissa McCarthy	2	0	Bridesmaids (2011), Can You Ever Forgive Me? (2018)
Mary McDonnell	2	0	Dances with Wolves (1990), Passion Fish (1992)
Janet McTeer	2	0	Tumbleweeds (1999), Albert Nobbs (2011)
Bette Midler	2	0	The Rose (1979), For the Boys (1991)
Sylvia Miles	2	0	Midnight Cowboy (1969), Farewell, My Lovely (1975)
Samantha Morton	2	0	Sweet and Lowdown (1999), In America (2003)
Maria Ouspenskaya	2	0	Dodsworth (1936), Love Affair (1939)
Marjorie Rambeau	2	0	Primrose Path (1940), Torch Song (1953)
Lynn Redgrave	2	0	Georgy Girl (1966), Gods and Monsters (1998)
Joyce Redman	2	0	Tom Jones (1963), Othello (1965)
Miranda Richardson	2	0	Damage (1992), Tom & Viv (1994)
Margot Robbie	2	0	I Tonya (2017), Bombshell (2019)
Gena Rowlands^{[D]}	2	0	A Woman Under the Influence (1974), Gloria (1980)
Winona Ryder	2	0	The Age of Innocence (1993), Little Women (1994)
Talia Shire	2	0	The Godfather Part II (1974), Rocky (1976)
Jean Simmons	2	0	Hamlet (1948), The Happy Ending (1969)
Kim Stanley	2	0	Séance on a Wet Afternoon (1964), Frances (1982)
Liv Ullmann	2	0	The Emigrants (1972), Face to Face (1976)
Julie Walters	2	0	Educating Rita (1983), Billy Elliot (2000)
Emily Watson	2	0	Breaking the Waves (1996), Hilary and Jackie (1998)
Naomi Watts	2	0	21 Grams (2003), The Impossible (2012)
Jacki Weaver	2	0	Animal Kingdom (2010), Silver Linings Playbook (2012)
May Whitty	2	0	Night Must Fall (1937), Mrs. Miniver (1942)

== Most nominations by category (actor) ==
Listed are the actors with three or more nominations plus those with two wins from two nominations.

=== Best Actor ===
Actor	Total	Wins	Winning films
Spencer Tracy	9	2	Captains Courageous (1937), Boys Town (1938)
Laurence Olivier	9	1	Hamlet (1948)
Jack Nicholson	8	2	One Flew Over the Cuckoo's Nest (1975), As Good as it Gets (1997)
Paul Newman	8	1	The Color of Money (1986)
Peter O'Toole	8	0	—
Marlon Brando	7	2	On the Waterfront (1954), The Godfather (1972)
Dustin Hoffman	7	2	Kramer vs. Kramer (1979), Rain Man (1988)
Jack Lemmon	7	1	Save the Tiger (1973)
Denzel Washington	7	1	Training Day (2001)
Daniel Day-Lewis	6	3	My Left Foot (1989), There Will Be Blood (2007), Lincoln (2012)
Leonardo DiCaprio	6	1	The Revenant (2015)
Paul Muni	6	1	The Story of Louis Pasteur (1936)
Richard Burton	6	0	—
Gary Cooper	5	2	Seargeant York (1941), High Noon (1952)
Tom Hanks	5	2	Philadelphia (1993), Forrest Gump (1994)
Fredric March	5	2	Dr. Jekyll and Mr. Hyde (1931), The Best Years of Our Lives (1946)
Sean Penn	5	2	Mystic River (2003), Milk (2008)
Robert De Niro	5	1	Raging Bull (1980)
Al Pacino	5	1	Scent of a Woman (1992)
Gregory Peck	5	1	To Kill a Mockingbird (1962)
James Stewart	5	1	The Philadelphia Story (1940)
Anthony Hopkins	4	2	The Silence of the Lambs (1991), The Father (2020)
Burt Lancaster	4	1	Elmer Gantry (1960)
Warren Beatty	4	0	—
Charles Boyer	4	0	—
Michael Caine	4	0	—
Bradley Cooper	4	0	—
Albert Finney	4	0	—
Humphrey Bogart	3	1	The African Queen (1951)
Jeff Bridges	3	1	Crazy Heart (2009)
James Cagney	3	1	Yankee Doodle Dandy (1942)
Ronald Colman	3	1	A Double Life (1947)
Bing Crosby	3	1	Going My Way (1944)
Russell Crowe	3	1	Gladiator (2000)
Robert Duvall	3	1	Tender Mercies (1983)
Clark Gable	3	1	It Happened One Night (1934)
William Holden	3	1	Stalag 17 (1953)
William Hurt	3	1	Kiss of the Spider Woman (1985)
Charles Laughton	3	1	The Private Life of Henry VIII (1933)
Gary Oldman	3	1	Darkest Hour (2017)
Joaquin Phoenix	3	1	Joker (2019)
Will Smith	3	1	King Richard (2021)
Jon Voight	3	1	Coming Home (1978)
Javier Bardem	3	0	—
Timothée Chalamet	3	0	—
Montgomery Clift	3	0	—
George Clooney	3	0	—
Johnny Depp	3	0	—
Kirk Douglas	3	0	—
Morgan Freeman	3	0	—
Marcello Mastroianni	3	0	—
Viggo Mortensen	3	0	—
William Powell	3	0	—
Robin Williams	3	0	—
Adrien Brody	2	2	The Pianist (2002), The Brutalist (2024)

=== Best Supporting Actor ===
Actor	Total	Wins	Winning films
Walter Brennan	4	3	Come and Get It (1936), Kentucky (1938), The Westerner (1940)
Jack Nicholson	4	1	Terms of Endearment (1983)
Jeff Bridges	4	0	—
Robert Duvall	4	0	—
Arthur Kennedy	4	0	—
Al Pacino	4	0	—
Claude Rains	4	0	—
Mark Ruffalo	4	0	—
Jason Robards	3	2	All the President's Men (1976), Julia (1977)
Peter Ustinov	3	2	Spartacus (1960), Topkapi (1964)
Charles Coburn	3	1	The More the Merrier (1943)
Robert De Niro	3	1	The Godfather Part II (1974)
Gene Hackman	3	1	Unforgiven (1992)
Tommy Lee Jones	3	1	The Fugitive (1993)
Martin Landau	3	1	Ed Wood (1994)
Jack Palance	3	1	City Slickers (1991)
Joe Pesci	3	1	Goodfellas (1990)
Christopher Plummer	3	1	Beginners (2011)
Gig Young	3	1	They Shoot Horses, Don't They? (1969)
Charles Bickford	3	0	—
Willem Dafoe	3	0	—
Ed Harris	3	0	—
Philip Seymour Hoffman	3	0	—
Edward Norton	3	0	—
Mahershala Ali	2	2	Moonlight (2016), Green Book (2018)
Michael Caine	2	2	Hannah and Her Sisters (1986), The Cider House Rules (1999)
Melvyn Douglas	2	2	Hud (1963), Being There (1979)
Anthony Quinn	2	2	Viva Zapata! (1952), Lust for Life (1956)
Christoph Waltz	2	2	Inglourious Basterds (2009), Django Unchained (2012)

== Most nominations by category (actress) ==
=== Best Actress ===
Actress	Total	Wins	Winning films
Meryl Streep	17	2	Sophie's Choice (1982), The Iron Lady (2011)
Katharine Hepburn	12	4	Morning Glory (1933), Guess Who's Coming to Dinner (1967); The Lion in Winter (1968), On Golden Pond (1981)
Bette Davis	11	2	Dangerous (1935), Jezebel (1938)
Greer Garson	7	1	Mrs. Miniver (1942)
Ingrid Bergman	6	2	Gaslight (1944), Anastasia (1956)
Jane Fonda	6	2	Klute (1971), Coming Home (1978)
Sissy Spacek	6	1	Coal Miner's Daughter (1980)
Deborah Kerr	6	0	—
Elizabeth Taylor	5	2	BUtterfield 8 (1960), Who's Afraid of Virginia Woolf? (1966)
Anne Bancroft	5	1	The Miracle Worker (1962)
Cate Blanchett	5	1	Blue Jasmine (2013)
Ellen Burstyn	5	1	Alice Doesn't Live Here Anymore (1974)
Susan Hayward	5	1	I Want to Live! (1958)
Audrey Hepburn	5	1	Roman Holiday (1953)
Jessica Lange	5	1	Blue Sky (1994)
Shirley MacLaine	5	1	Terms of Endearment (1983)
Susan Sarandon	5	1	Dead Man Walking (1995)
Norma Shearer	5	1	The Divorcee (1930)
Judi Dench	5	0	—
Irene Dunne	5	0	—
Olivia de Havilland	4	2	To Each His Own (1946), The Heiress (1949)
Glenda Jackson	4	2	Women in Love (1970), A Touch of Class (1973)
Julie Christie	4	1	Darling (1965)
Jennifer Jones	4	1	The Song of Bernadette (1943)
Diane Keaton	4	1	Annie Hall (1977)
Nicole Kidman	4	1	The Hours (2001)
Geraldine Page	4	1	The Trip to Bountiful (1985)
Kate Winslet	4	1	The Reader (2008)
Joanne Woodward	4	1	The Three Faces of Eve (1957)
Jane Wyman	4	1	Johnny Belinda (1948)
Annette Bening	4	0	—
Glenn Close	4	0	—
Marsha Mason	4	0	—
Vanessa Redgrave	4	0	—
Rosalind Russell	4	0	—
Barbara Stanwyck	4	0	—
Frances McDormand	3	3	Fargo (1996), Three Billboards Outside Ebbing, Missouri (2017), Nomadland (2020)
Jodie Foster	3	2	The Accused (1988), The Silence of the Lambs (1991)
Emma Stone	3	2	La La Land (2016), Poor Things (2023)
Julie Andrews	3	1	Mary Poppins (1964)
Claudette Colbert	3	1	It Happened One Night (1934)
Joan Crawford	3	1	Mildred Pierce (1945)
Faye Dunaway	3	1	Network (1976)
Joan Fontaine	3	1	Suspicion (1941)
Jennifer Lawrence	3	1	Silver Linings Playbook (2012)
Julianne Moore	3	1	Still Alice (2014)
Charlize Theron	3	1	Monster (2003)
Emma Thompson	3	1	Howards End (1992)
Renée Zellweger	3	1	Judy (2019)
Greta Garbo	3	0	—
Carey Mulligan	3	0	—
Eleanor Parker	3	0	—
Saoirse Ronan	3	0	—
Gloria Swanson	3	0	—
Michelle Williams	3	0	–
Debra Winger	3	0	—
Sally Field	2	2	Norma Rae (1979), Places in the Heart (1984)
Vivien Leigh	2	2	Gone with the Wind (1939), A Streetcar Named Desire (1951)
Luise Rainer	2	2	The Great Ziegfeld (1936), The Good Earth (1937)
Hilary Swank	2	2	Boys Don't Cry (1999), Million Dollar Baby (2004)

=== Best Supporting Actress ===
Actress	Total	Wins	Winning films
Thelma Ritter	6	0	—
Amy Adams	5	0	—
Ethel Barrymore	4	1	None but the Lonely Heart (1944)
Lee Grant	4	1	Shampoo (1975)
Maggie Smith	4	1	California Suite (1978)
Maureen Stapleton	4	1	Reds (1981)
Meryl Streep	4	1	Kramer vs. Kramer (1979)
Glenn Close	4	0	—
Agnes Moorehead	4	0	—
Geraldine Page	4	0	—
Shelley Winters	3	2	The Diary of Anne Frank (1959), A Patch of Blue (1965)
Dianne Wiest	3	2	Hannah and Her Sisters (1986), Bullets over Broadway (1994)
Cate Blanchett	3	1	The Aviator (2004)
Judi Dench	3	1	Shakespeare in Love (1998)
Celeste Holm	3	1	Gentleman's Agreement (1947)
Anne Revere	3	1	National Velvet (1944)
Octavia Spencer	3	1	The Help (2011)
Marisa Tomei	3	1	My Cousin Vinny (1992)
Claire Trevor	3	1	Key Largo (1948)
Kathy Bates	3	0	—
Gladys Cooper	3	0	—
Diane Ladd	3	0	—
Angela Lansbury	3	0	—
Frances McDormand	3	0	—
Kate Winslet	3	0	—

== Actors with two or more acting nominations who have won Academy Awards in non-acting categories ==
- TN = Total Nominations.
- AN = Acting Nominations.

Actor/Actress	TN	AN	Wins	Winning categories and films
Warren Beatty	14	4	1	Best Director for Reds (1981)
Clint Eastwood	11	2	4	Best Picture and Best Director for Unforgiven (1992) and Million Dollar Baby (2004)
George Clooney	8	4	2	Best Supporting Actor for Syriana (2005) and Best Picture for Argo (2012)
Kenneth Branagh	8	2	1	Best Original Screenplay for Belfast (2021)
Frances McDormand	8	6	4	Best Actress for Fargo (1996), Three Billboards Outside Ebbing, Missouri (2017) and Nomadland (2020); Best Picture for Nomadland (2020)
Brad Pitt	8	4	2	Best Picture for 12 Years a Slave (2013) and Best Supporting Actor for Once Upon a Time in Hollywood (2019)
Charlie Chaplin	5 (9)^{[J]}	1 (2)	1	Best Original Dramatic Score for Limelight (1952) (not released in Los Angeles until 1972)
Barbra Streisand	5	2	2	Best Actress for Funny Girl (1968) and Best Original Song for Evergreen Love Theme from A Star Is Born (1976)
Emma Thompson	5	4	2	Best Actress for Howards End (1992) and Best Adapted Screenplay for Sense and Sensibility (1995)
Matt Damon	5	3	1	Best Original Screenplay for Good Will Hunting (1997)
Billy Bob Thornton	3	2	1	Best Adapted Screenplay for Sling Blade (1996)

== See also ==
- List of actors with two or more Academy Awards in acting categories
- List of actors nominated for Academy Awards for non-English performances
- List of directors with two or more Academy Awards for Best Director
- List of Academy Award records

== Notes ==
A^{1} ^{2} ^{3} Bette Davis's performance in Of Human Bondage (1934) and Paul Muni's performance in Black Fury (1935) were not nominated for Oscars. As a result of Davis's failure to get a nomination, several influential people campaigned to have her name included on the list, so for that year, and the following year also, the academy allowed a write-in vote. Technically, this meant that any performance was eligible. At the 6th, 7th, and 8th Academy Awards, the academy publicly announced those that placed second and third in the vote. Davis placed third ahead of one official nominee and Muni placed second, ahead of three official nominees (all from the same film, no less), and both Davis and Muni are listed on the academy's official database as write-in nominees who placed in the final voting. From the 9th Academy Awards, the nominating committees were no longer used and the entire membership of each individual branch voted for the nominees in their respective categories.
B^{1} Laurence Olivier received a total of 11 Oscar nominations, winning one. In addition to his 10 acting nominations, he received a Best Director nomination for Hamlet (1948). Prior to 1951, the Academy Award for Best Picture was credited to the production company, not individual producers, so Olivier was not credited for the Best Picture nomination for Henry V (1946) or Best Picture win for Hamlet. Olivier also received two Honorary Oscars: one for bringing Henry V to the screen, and a second in 1979 for Lifetime Achievement.
C^{1} ^{2} ^{3} ^{4} ^{5} ^{6} Denzel Washington, Leonardo DiCaprio, Shirley MacLaine, Will Smith, Timothée Chalamet, and Natalie Portman have all received an additional nomination in a non-acting category. MacLaine in the Best Documentary Feature category as co-director of the 1975 film The Other Half of the Sky: A China Memoir; Portman in the Best Animated Feature category for co-producing the 2025 film Arco; and Washington, DiCaprio, Smith, and Chalamet in the Best Picture category; Washington for co-producing Fences (2016), DiCaprio for co-producing The Wolf of Wall Street (2013), Smith for co-producing King Richard (2021), and Chalamet for co-producing Marty Supreme (2025).
D^{1} ^{2} ^{3} ^{4} ^{5} ^{6} ^{7} ^{8} ^{9} ^{10} ^{11} ^{12} ^{13} Actors who received multiple nominations without winning a competitive Oscar, but did receive an honorary Oscar, are: Charles Boyer (1943), Greta Garbo (1955), Barbara Stanwyck (1982), Deborah Kerr (1994), Kirk Douglas (1996), Peter O'Toole (2003), Angela Lansbury (2013), Gena Rowlands (2015), Tom Cruise (2025), and Glenn Close (2026), who all received the Academy Honorary Award; Rosalind Russell (1973), who received the Jean Hersholt Humanitarian Award; Judy Garland (1940), who received the Academy Juvenile Award; and Mickey Rooney, who received both the Academy Juvenile Award (1939) and the Academy Honorary Award (1983).
E^{1} ^{2} At the 2nd Academy Awards only the Best Actor and Best Actress winners were announced. There was no announcement of nominations. The official Academy site states that "although not official nominations, the additional names in each category, according to in-house records, were under consideration by various boards of judges". Although unofficial, Ruth Chatterton's nomination at the 2nd ceremony (the first of her two) counts towards her total in the above lists, and Paul Muni's nomination at the 2nd ceremony, counts as one of his six nominations in the above lists.
F^{1} ^{2} ^{3} Rules at the time of the first three Academy Award ceremonies allowed for a performer to receive a single nomination for their work in more than one film. At the 1st ceremony, Emil Jannings won Best Actor for his work in two films and Janet Gaynor won Best Actress for her work in three films. Richard Barthelmess also received a nomination for two films at the 1st ceremony. At the 3rd ceremony, George Arliss, Maurice Chevalier, Ronald Colman, Greta Garbo, and Norma Shearer all received a single nomination for their work in two films. This is why the academy lists Colman and Garbo as three-time nominees and Shearer as a five-time nominee. Barthelmess, Arliss, and Chevalier are one-time nominees, so do not feature in the above lists. No official reason was ever given as to why Arliss and Shearer were named Best Actor and Best Actress for only one of the two films for which they were listed.
G^{1} ^{2} ^{3} ^{4} ^{5} ^{6} ^{7} Frances McDormand, George Clooney, Emma Thompson, Warren Beatty, Brad Pitt, Matt Damon, and Clint Eastwood have all won Oscars in non-acting categories. McDormand has seven Oscar nominations with four wins. In addition to her three Best Actress wins, she won for co-producing Best Picture winner Nomadland (2020). Clooney has eight Oscar nominations (four for acting, two for writing, one for directing, and one for producing) with two wins. In addition to his win for Best Supporting Actor, he won Best Picture for co-producing Argo (2012). Thompson is a five-time nominee with two wins. In addition to her Best Actress win, she won the Academy Award for Best Adapted Screenplay for Sense and Sensibility (1995). Beatty is a 14-time nominee (four for acting, four for writing, four for producing, and two for directing), winning Best Director for Reds (1981). Pitt is an eight-time Oscar nominee (four for acting, four for producing). In addition to his win for Best Supporting Actor, he won for co-producing Best Picture winner 12 Years a Slave (2013). Damon is a five-time nominee (three for acting, one for writing, and one for co-producing 2016 Best Picture nominee Manchester by the Sea), winning the Academy Award for Best Original Screenplay (shared with Ben Affleck) for Good Will Hunting (1997). Eastwood is an 11-time nominee (five for producing, four for directing, two for acting), winning four; Best Director and Best Picture for Unforgiven (1992) and Million Dollar Baby (2004). Both Eastwood (1995) and Beatty (2000) have also received the Irving G. Thalberg Memorial Award.
H^{1} Bradley Cooper has a total of twelve Oscar nominations. In addition to his five acting nominations, he has received a Best Adapted Screenplay nomination for A Star Is Born, a Best Original Screenplay nomination for Maestro and five nominations for Best Picture for co-producing American Sniper (2014), A Star Is Born (2018), Joker (2019), Nightmare Alley (2021), and Maestro (2023)
I^{1} Emma Stone has a total of seven Oscar nominations. In addition to her five acting nominations, she has received two nominations for Best Picture for co-producing Poor Things (2023) and Bugonia (2025)
J^{1} At the 1st Academy Award ceremony, Charlie Chaplin received four nominations (including Best Actor) for his film The Circus, before the academy decided to remove his name from the competitive categories and instead honor him with a special award. A letter sent by the academy to Chaplin told him that they had "Unanimously decided that your name should be removed from the competitive classes, and that a special award be conferred upon you for writing, acting, directing, and producing The Circus. The collective accomplishments thus displayed place you in a class by yourself". Chaplin went on to receive nominations for Best Actor, Best Writing, and Best Picture (the latter credited to Charlie Chaplin Productions) for the 1940 film The Great Dictator and a Best Writing nomination for the 1947 film Monsieur Verdoux. He received a second Honorary Oscar at the 44th Academy Awards in 1972, before winning his sole competitive Oscar at the 45th Academy Awards in 1973 for Best Original Dramatic Score for his 1952 film Limelight, which was eligible for that years Oscars because it was not released in Los Angeles until 1972.
