= 36th Directors Guild of America Awards =

- Date: March 10, 1984
- Country: United States
- Presented by: Directors Guild of America

Highlights
- Best Director Feature Film: Terms of Endearment – James L. Brooks
- Website: https://www.dga.org/Awards/History/1980s/1983.aspx?value=1983

The 36th Directors Guild of America Awards, honoring the outstanding directorial achievements in film and television in 1983, were presented on March 10, 1984.

== Winners and nominees ==
=== Film ===
Feature Film

James L. Brooks – Terms of Endearment

- Bruce Beresford – Tender Mercies
- Ingmar Bergman – Fanny and Alexander
- Lawrence Kasdan – The Big Chill
- Philip Kaufman – The Right Stuff

=== Television ===
Drama Series

Jeff Bleckner – Hill Street Blues for "Life in the Minors"

- Corey Allen – Hill Street Blues for "Goodbye, Mr. Scripps"
- Christian Nyby – Hill Street Blues for "Here's Adventure, Here's Romance"
Comedy Series

James Burrows – Cheers for "Showdown (Part 2)"

- Jim Drake – Buffalo Bill for "Woody Quits"
- Noam Pitlik – Taxi for "Louie and the Blind Girl"
Miniseries or TV Film

Edward Zwick – Special Bulletin

- Daryl Duke – The Thorn Birds
- John Erman – Who Will Love My Children?
Musical Variety

Don Mischer – Motown 25: Yesterday, Today, Forever

- Emile Ardolino – Live from Lincoln Center for "NYC Ballet Salute to George Balanchine"
- Daniel Feldman – Kennedy Center Tonight for Eubie Blake: A Century of Music
Daytime Drama

Sharron Miller – ABC Afterschool Special for "The Woman Who Willed a Miracle"

- G. Cullingham – ABC Afterschool Special for "It's No Crush, I'm in Love"
- Marlena Laird – General Hospital for "Show No. 242"
Documentary/Actuality

Harry Moses – Our Times with Bill Moyers for "Willy Loman Comes to China"

- Alfred R. Kelman and Charles Bangert – The Body Human: The Living Code
- Charles Stone – Viewpoint: The Day After

=== Commercials ===
Commercials

Stuart Hagmann (TIE)
Bob Brooks (TIE)

- Manny Perez – Dr Pepper's "Detective", "Hunchback", and "Last Meal"
- Joe Pytka – Bud Light's "Boxer", "Pairs", and "Rodeo"
- Neil Tardio – United States Army's "Father & Son" and Xerox' "Laser Printing"

=== D.W. Griffith Award ===
- Orson Welles

=== Robert B. Aldrich Service Award ===
- Robert Wise
