= 1983 New York Film Critics Circle Awards =

49th New York Film Critics Circle Awards

49th New York Film Critics Circle Awards

January 29, 1984

Best Film:
Terms of Endearment

The 49th New York Film Critics Circle Awards honored the best filmmaking of 1983. The winners were announced on 21 December 1983 and the awards were given on 29 January 1984.

== Winners ==
- Best Actor:
  - Robert Duvall - Tender Mercies
  - Runner-up: Gérard Depardieu - Danton and The Return of Martin Guerre (Le retour de Martin Guerre)
- Best Actress:
  - Shirley MacLaine - Terms of Endearment
  - Runner-up: Debra Winger - Terms of Endearment
- Best Cinematography:
  - Gordon Willis - Zelig
- Best Director:
  - Ingmar Bergman - Fanny and Alexander (Fanny och Alexander)
  - Runner-up: Philip Kaufman - The Right Stuff
- Best Film:
  - Terms of Endearment
  - Runners-up: The Right Stuff and Silkwood
- Best Foreign Language Film:
  - Fanny and Alexander (Fanny och Alexander) • Sweden
- Best Screenplay:
  - Bill Forsyth - Local Hero
  - Runner-up: James L. Brooks - Terms of Endearment
- Best Supporting Actor:
  - Jack Nicholson - Terms of Endearment
  - Runner-up: Ed Harris - The Right Stuff
- Best Supporting Actress:
  - Linda Hunt - The Year of Living Dangerously
  - Runner-up: Cher - Silkwood
