= Anthony Mondell =

American set decorator

- Born: May 18, 1916; Los Angeles, California, USA
- Died: May 15, 2009 (aged 92); Los Angeles, California, USA
- Occupation: Set decorator
- Years active: 1955-1983

Anthony Mondell (born Anthony Mondelli, May 18, 1916 – May 15, 2009) was nominated for an Academy Award in the category Best Art Direction for the film Terms of Endearment.

== Selected filmography ==
- Cinderella (1965)
- The Night of the Grizzly (1966)
- Cancel My Reservation (1972)
- The Other Side of Midnight (1977)
- The Last Waltz (1978)
- Rescue from Gilligan's Island (TV) (1978)
- Terms of Endearment (1983)
