= 1983 Los Angeles Film Critics Association Awards =

Annual US film awards ceremony

9th LAFCA Awards
- Date: December 17, 1983

Highlights
- Best Picture: Terms of Endearment

The 9th Los Angeles Film Critics Association Awards, honoring the best filmmaking of 1983, were announced on 17 December 1983.

== Winners ==
- Best Picture:
  - Terms of Endearment
  - Runner-up: Tender Mercies
- Best Director:
  - James L. Brooks – Terms of Endearment
  - Runner-up: Bruce Beresford – Tender Mercies
- Best Actor:
  - Robert Duvall – Tender Mercies
  - Runner-up: Tom Conti – Reuben, Reuben
- Best Actress:
  - Shirley MacLaine – Terms of Endearment
  - Runner-up: Jane Alexander – Testament
- Best Supporting Actor:
  - Jack Nicholson – Terms of Endearment
  - Runner-up: John Lithgow – Terms of Endearment and Twilight Zone: The Movie
- Best Supporting Actress:
  - Linda Hunt – The Year of Living Dangerously
  - Runner-up: Cher – Silkwood
- Best Screenplay:
  - James L. Brooks – Terms of Endearment
  - Runner-up: Lawrence Kasdan and Barbara Benedek – The Big Chill
- Best Cinematography:
  - Sven Nykvist – Fanny and Alexander (Fanny och Alexander)
  - Runner-up: Hiro Narita – Never Cry Wolf
- Best Music Score:
  - Philip Glass – Koyaanisqatsi
  - Runner-up: Billy Goldenberg – Reuben, Reuben
- Best Foreign Film:
  - Fanny and Alexander (Fanny och Alexander) • Sweden/France/West Germany
- Experimental/Independent Film/Video Award:
  - Michael Snow – So Is This
- New Generation Award:
  - Sean Penn
- Career Achievement Award:
  - Myrna Loy
- Special Citation:
  - Restored versions of A Star Is Born and The Leopard
