= National Board of Review Awards 1983 =

Annual US film awards ceremony

55th National Board of Review Awards

December 14, 1983

← 1982 — 1984 →

The 55th National Board of Review Awards were announced on December 14, 1983.

== Top Ten Films ==
1. Betrayal, Terms of Endearment
2. Educating Rita
3. Tender Mercies
4. The Dresser
5. The Right Stuff
6. Testament
7. Local Hero
8. The Big Chill
9. Cross Creek
10. Yentl

== Top Foreign Films ==
1. Fanny and Alexander
2. The Return of Martin Guerre
3. That Night in Varennes
4. La traviata
5. Boat People

== Winners ==
- Best Film: Betrayal, Terms of Endearment
- Best Foreign Film: Fanny and Alexander
- Best Actor: Tom Conti (Reuben, Reuben, Merry Christmas, Mr. Lawrence)
- Best Actress: Shirley MacLaine (Terms of Endearment)
- Best Supporting Actor: Jack Nicholson (Terms of Endearment)
- Best Supporting Actress: Linda Hunt (The Year of Living Dangerously)
- Best Director: James L. Brooks (Terms of Endearment)
- Career Achievement Award: Gregory Peck
