= Tom Pedigo =

Set decorator

- Born: March 4, 1940; Los Angeles, California
- Died: January 25, 2000 (aged 59); Los Angeles, California
- Occupation: Set decorator
- Years active: 1977-1992

Tom Pedigo (March 4, 1940 – January 25, 2000) was an American set decorator. He was nominated for an Academy Award in the category Best Art Direction for the film Terms of Endearment. He was also nominated for two Emmy Awards, winning one for OUTSTANDING INDIVIDUAL ACHIEVEMENT IN ART DIRECTION FOR A SERIES - 1993 for the TV series Homefront.

== Selected filmography ==
- Terms of Endearment (1983)
