= 1983 National Society of Film Critics Awards =

Annual US film awards ceremony

18th NSFC Awards

January 4, 1984

Best Film:
The Night of
the Shooting Stars

The 18th National Society of Film Critics Awards, given on 4 January 1984, honored the best filmmaking of 1983.

== Winners ==
=== Best Picture ===
1. The Night of the Shooting Stars (La notte di San Lorenzo)
2. Berlin Alexanderplatz
2. Fanny and Alexander (Fanny och Alexander)

=== Best Director ===
1. Paolo and Vittorio Taviani – The Night of the Shooting Stars (La notte di San Lorenzo)
2. Philip Kaufman – The Right Stuff
3. Ingmar Bergman – Fanny and Alexander (Fanny och Alexander)

=== Best Actor ===
1. Gérard Depardieu – Danton and The Return of Martin Guerre (Le retour de Martin Guerre)
2. Robert Duvall – Tender Mercies
3. Günter Lamprecht – Berlin Alexanderplatz

=== Best Actress ===
1. Debra Winger – Terms of Endearment
2. Joanna Cassidy – Under Fire
3. Bonnie Bedelia – Heart Like a Wheel (film)
4. Shirley MacLaine – Terms of Endearment

=== Best Supporting Actor ===
- Jack Nicholson – Terms of Endearment

=== Best Supporting Actress ===
1. Sandra Bernhard – The King of Comedy
2. Cher – Silkwood
3. Linda Hunt – The Year of Living Dangerously

=== Best Screenplay ===
1. Bill Forsyth – Local Hero
2. Clayton Frohman and Ron Shelton – Under Fire
3. James L. Brooks – Terms of Endearment

=== Best Cinematography ===
1. Hiro Narita – Never Cry Wolf
2. Gordon Willis – Zelig
3. John Alcott – Under Fire
