= Terms of Endearment =

1983 comedy-drama film directed by James L. Brooks

- Theatrical release poster
- Directed by: James L. Brooks
- Screenplay by: James L. Brooks
- Based on: Terms of Endearment; 1975 novel by Larry McMurtry
- Produced by: James L. Brooks
- Starring: Debra Winger; Shirley MacLaine; Jack Nicholson; Danny DeVito; Jeff Daniels; John Lithgow
- Cinematography: Andrzej Bartkowiak
- Edited by: Richard Marks
- Music by: Michael Gore
- Distributed by: Paramount Pictures
- Release dates: November 23, 1983 (US: limited); December 9, 1983 (US: wide)
- Running time: 132 minutes
- Country: United States
- Language: English
- Budget: $8 million
- Box office: $165 million

Terms of Endearment is a 1983 American tragicomedy film directed, written, and produced by James L. Brooks, adapted from Larry McMurtry's 1975 novel. The ensemble cast stars Debra Winger, Shirley MacLaine, Jack Nicholson, Danny DeVito, Jeff Daniels, and John Lithgow. The film covers 30 years of the relationship between Aurora Greenway (MacLaine) and her daughter Emma Greenway-Horton (Winger).

Terms of Endearment was theatrically released in limited theatres on November 23, 1983, and to a wider release on December 9 by Paramount Pictures. The film received critical acclaim and was a major commercial success, grossing $165 million at the box office, becoming the second-highest-grossing film of 1983 (after Return of the Jedi). At the 56th Academy Awards, the film received a leading 11 nominations, and won a leading five awards: Best Picture, Best Director, Best Actress (MacLaine), Best Adapted Screenplay, and Best Supporting Actor (Nicholson). A sequel, The Evening Star, was released in 1996.

== Plot ==
Aurora Greenway, a widow since her daughter Emma was a child, keeps several suitors at arm's length in River Oaks, Houston, focusing instead on her close, but controlling relationship with Emma. Anxious to escape her mother, Emma marries callow young college professor Flap Horton over her mother's objections.

Despite their frequent spats and difficulty getting along with each other, Emma and Aurora have very close ties and keep in touch by telephone. Soon after the wedding, Emma gets pregnant with their first child. He is a few years old when she is again expecting another.

The small family moves to Iowa in order for Flap to pursue a career as an English professor. When they run into financial difficulties, Emma calls Aurora for help. After Emma admits she is pregnant with a third child, her mother suggests she go to Colorado for an abortion.

When Flap gets home, as he was away overnight, Emma demands to be told if he is having an affair. He insists it is paranoia, brought on by the pregnancy hormones. While at the grocery store, Emma does not have enough money to pay for all of her groceries and meets Sam Burns, who helps pay for them.

Meanwhile, the lonely Aurora, while at a birthday dinner to celebrate her "50th" birthday, feels insulted when her doctor (a guest at her party) chides her for claiming to be two years younger than her actual age. She overcomes her repression and begins a whirlwind romance with her next-door neighbor, retired astronaut Garrett Breedlove, who is promiscuous and coarse. Simultaneously, Emma and Sam strike up a friendship and quickly an affair as Sam's wife refuses to have sex with him, and she suspects Flap of infidelity.

Over the course of the next few years, the marriage begins to fray. Emma catches Flap flirting with one of his students on campus, so she takes the children and drives back to Houston immediately. There, Garrett develops cold feet about his relationship with Aurora after seeing her with her daughter and grandchildren and breaks it off.

While Emma is gone, Flap accepts a promotion in Nebraska; she and the children return to Iowa, then they move to Nebraska. While on the campus, Emma sees the same young woman who she had seen Flap with in Iowa. Confronting her, she finds out he moved them to Nebraska so he could work with his girlfriend Janice.

When Emma is diagnosed with cancer, before she knows how advanced it is, her lifelong friend Patsy convinces her to explore New York City. She is there a short time when Patsy's friends there first find it strange that she has never worked; then it gets more uncomfortable when they hear about the cancer. Not enjoying herself, she returns home early.

When they discover it is terminal cancer, Aurora and Flap stay by Emma's side through her treatment and hospitalization. Garrett flies to Nebraska to be with Aurora and her family. The dying Emma shows her love for her mother by entrusting her children to Aurora's care.

== Cast ==
- Shirley MacLaine as Aurora Greenway
- Debra Winger as Emma Greenway-Horton
- Jack Nicholson as Garrett Breedlove
- Danny DeVito as Vernon Dalhart
- Jeff Daniels as Flap Horton
- John Lithgow as Sam Burns
- Lisa Hart Carroll as Patsy Clark
- Huckleberry Fox as Ted "Teddy" Horton
- Troy Bishop as Tom "Tommy" Horton
  - Shane Sherwin as Tom "Tommy" Horton (toddler)
- Megan Morris as Melanie Horton
  - Tara Yeakey as Melanie Horton (infant)
- Betty R. King as Rosie Dunlop
- Norman Bennett as Edward Johnson
- Kate Charleson as Janice
- Debi Richter as Leann
- Mary Kay Place as Doris (voice)
- David Wohl as Phil
- Paul Menzel as Dr. Maise
- Albert Brooks as Rudyard Greenway, Aurora's husband (voice only)

== Production ==
James L. Brooks wrote the supporting role of Garrett Breedlove for Burt Reynolds, who turned down the role because of a verbal commitment he had made to appear in Stroker Ace. "There are no awards in Hollywood for being an idiot", Reynolds later said of the decision. Harrison Ford and Paul Newman also turned down the role.

The exterior shots of Aurora Greenway's home were filmed at 3060 Locke Lane, Houston, Texas. The exterior shots of locations intended to be in Des Moines, Iowa and Kearney, Nebraska were instead filmed in Lincoln, Nebraska. Many scenes were filmed on, or near, the campus of the University of Nebraska–Lincoln. While filming in Lincoln, the state capital, Winger met then-governor of Nebraska Bob Kerrey; the two wound up dating for two years.

Shirley MacLaine and Debra Winger reportedly did not get along with each other during production. MacLaine confirmed in an interview that "it was a very tough shoot ... Chaotic...(Jim) likes working with tension on the set." MacLaine has written that during filming Nicholson and Winger held her down with her legs spread apart, with Winger licking her leg until MacLaine was able to fight her way free. At other times, Winger passed gas in MacLaine's face, and grabbed her breast. Winger admitted they fought and that there was truth in the allegations.

On working with Jack Nicholson, MacLaine said, "Working with Jack Nicholson was crazy", but that his spontaneity may have contributed to her performance. She also said,

We're like old smoothies working together. You know the old smoothies they used to show whenever you went to the Ice Follies. They would have this elderly man and woman—who at that time were 40—and they had a little bit too much weight around the waist and were moving a little slower. But they danced so elegantly and so in synch with each other that the audience just laid back and sort of sighed. That's the way it is working with Jack. We both know what the other is going to do. And we don't socialize, or anything. It's an amazing chemistry—a wonderful, wonderful feeling.

MacLaine also confirmed in an interview with USA Today that Nicholson improvised when he put his hand down her dress in the beach scene.

== Reception ==
=== Box office ===
Terms of Endearment was commercially successful at the box office. On its opening weekend, it grossed $3.4 million, ranking number two at the US box office, until its second weekend, when it grossed $3.1 million, ranking number one at the box office. Three weekends later, it arrived number one again, with $9 million, having wide release. For four weekends, it remained number one at the box office, and it slipped to number two on its tenth weekend. On the film's 11th weekend, it arrived number one (for the sixth and final time), grossing $3 million. The film grossed $109 million in the United States and Canada and $165 million worldwide.

=== Critical reception ===
Terms of Endearment received critical acclaim at the time of its release. On Rotten Tomatoes, the film has an 82% approval rating based on 109 reviews, with a weighted average of 8.1/10. The site's consensus reads: "A classic tearjerker, Terms of Endearment isn't shy about reaching for the heartstrings – but is so well-acted and smartly scripted that it's almost impossible to resist." Metacritic reports a score of 79 out of 100 based on reviews from ten critics, indicating "generally favorable reviews". Audiences polled by CinemaScore gave the film an average grade of "A" on an A+ to F scale.

Roger Ebert gave the film a four-out-of-four star rating, calling it "a wonderful film" and stating, "There isn't a thing that I would change, and I was exhilarated by the freedom it gives itself to move from the high comedy of Nicholson's best moments to the acting of Debra Winger in the closing scenes." Gene Siskel, who also gave the film a highly enthusiastic review, correctly predicted upon its release that it would go on to win the Academy Award for Best Picture of 1983.

In his movie guide, Leonard Maltin awarded the film a rare four-star rating, calling it a "Wonderful mix of humor and heartache," and concluded the film was "Consistently offbeat and unpredictable, with exceptional performances by all three stars."

=== Accolades ===
As of July 2022, Nicholson is one of the few supporting actors to ever sweep "The Big Four" critics awards (Los Angeles Film Critics Association, National Board of Review, New York Film Critics Circle, National Society of Film Critics) for his performance of Garrett Breedlove. In 2006, Writers Guild of America West ranked the film's screenplay 64th in WGA’s list of 101 Greatest Screenplays.

Award	Category	Nominee(s)	Result	Ref.
Academy Awards	Best Picture	James L. Brooks	Won	
Academy Awards	Best Director	James L. Brooks	Won	
Academy Awards	Best Screenplay – Based on Material from Another Medium	James L. Brooks	Won	
Academy Awards	Best Actress	Debra Winger	Nominated	
Academy Awards	Best Actress	Shirley MacLaine	Won	
Academy Awards	Best Supporting Actor	Jack Nicholson	Won	
Academy Awards	Best Supporting Actor	John Lithgow	Nominated	
Academy Awards	Best Art Direction	Art Direction: Polly Platt and Harold Michelson; Set Decoration: Tom Pedigo and Anthony Mondell	Nominated	
Academy Awards	Best Film Editing	Richard Marks	Nominated	
Academy Awards	Best Original Score	Michael Gore	Nominated	
Academy Awards	Best Sound	James R. Alexander, Rick Kline, Donald O. Mitchell, and Kevin O'Connell	Nominated	
Boston Society of Film Critics Awards	Best American Film		Won	
Boston Society of Film Critics Awards	Best Supporting Actor	Jack Nicholson	Won	
British Academy Film Awards	Best Actress in a Leading Role	Shirley MacLaine	Nominated	
David di Donatello Awards	Best Foreign Film		Nominated	
David di Donatello Awards	Best Foreign Actress	Debra Winger	Nominated	
David di Donatello Awards	Best Foreign Actress	Shirley MacLaine	Won	
Directors Guild of America Awards	Outstanding Directorial Achievement in Motion Pictures	James L. Brooks	Won	
Golden Globe Awards	Best Motion Picture – Drama		Won	
Golden Globe Awards	Best Actress in a Motion Picture – Drama	Debra Winger	Nominated	
Golden Globe Awards	Best Actress in a Motion Picture – Drama	Shirley MacLaine	Won	
Golden Globe Awards	Best Supporting Actor – Motion Picture	Jack Nicholson	Won	
Golden Globe Awards	Best Director – Motion Picture	James L. Brooks	Nominated	
Golden Globe Awards	Best Screenplay – Motion Picture	James L. Brooks	Won	
Japan Academy Film Prize	Outstanding Foreign Language Film	James L. Brooks	Nominated	
Kansas City Film Critics Circle Awards	Best Film		Won (Note: Tied with Tender Mercies.)	
Kansas City Film Critics Circle Awards	Best Supporting Actor	Jack Nicholson	Won	
Los Angeles Film Critics Association Awards	Best Film		Won	
Los Angeles Film Critics Association Awards	Best Director	James L. Brooks	Won	
Los Angeles Film Critics Association Awards	Best Actress	Shirley MacLaine	Won	
Los Angeles Film Critics Association Awards	Best Supporting Actor	John Lithgow	Runner-up	
Los Angeles Film Critics Association Awards	Best Supporting Actor	Jack Nicholson	Won	
Los Angeles Film Critics Association Awards	Best Screenplay	James L. Brooks	Won	
National Board of Review Awards	Best Film		Won (Note: Tied with Betrayal.)	
National Board of Review Awards	Top Ten Films		Won	
National Board of Review Awards	Best Director	James L. Brooks	Won	
National Board of Review Awards	Best Actress	Shirley MacLaine	Won	
National Board of Review Awards	Best Supporting Actor	Jack Nicholson	Won	
National Society of Film Critics Awards	Best Actress	Shirley MacLaine	3rd Place	
National Society of Film Critics Awards	Best Actress	Debra Winger	Won	
National Society of Film Critics Awards	Best Supporting Actor	Jack Nicholson	Won	
National Society of Film Critics Awards	Best Screenplay	James L. Brooks	Nominated	
New York Film Critics Circle Awards	Best Film		Won	
New York Film Critics Circle Awards	Best Actress	Shirley MacLaine	Won	
New York Film Critics Circle Awards	Best Actress	Debra Winger	Runner-up	
New York Film Critics Circle Awards	Best Supporting Actor	John Lithgow	Nominated	
New York Film Critics Circle Awards	Best Supporting Actor	Jack Nicholson	Won	
New York Film Critics Circle Awards	Best Screenplay	James L. Brooks	Nominated	
Online Film & Television Association Awards	Film Hall of Fame: Productions		Inducted	
Writers Guild of America Awards	Best Comedy – Adapted from Another Medium	James L. Brooks	Won	

American Film Institute (nominations):

- AFI's 100 Years...100 Movies
- AFI's 100 Years...100 Laughs
- AFI's 100 Years...100 Movie Quotes:
  - Aurora: "Would you like to come in?" Garrett: "I'd rather stick needles in my eyes."
- AFI's 100 Years...100 Movies (10th Anniversary Edition)

== Sequel and stage adaptions ==
The sequel The Evening Star (1996), in which MacLaine and Nicholson reprised their roles, was a critical and commercial failure. A stage play, also titled Terms of Endearment and based on the novel, was written by Dan Gordon.
