= Tender Mercies =

1983 film by Bruce Beresford

- Theatrical release poster
- Directed by: Bruce Beresford
- Written by: Horton Foote
- Produced by: Philip S. Hobel
- Starring: Robert Duvall; Tess Harper; Betty Buckley; Wilford Brimley; Ellen Barkin
- Cinematography: Russell Boyd
- Edited by: William Anderson
- Music by: George Dreyfus
- Production companies: EMI Films; Antron Media
- Distributed by: Universal Pictures; Associated Film Distribution Corporation
- Release date: March 4, 1983
- Running time: 92 minutes
- Country: United States
- Language: English
- Budget: $7-8 million
- Box office: $8.4 million

Tender Mercies is a 1983 American drama film directed by Bruce Beresford and written by Horton Foote. It stars Robert Duvall as singer-songwriter Mac Sledge, a former country music star whose career and relationship with his ex-wife and daughter were wrecked by alcoholism. Recovering from his affliction, Sledge seeks to turn his life around through his relationship with a young widow and her son in rural Texas. The supporting cast includes Tess Harper, Betty Buckley, Wilford Brimley, Ellen Barkin, and Allan Hubbard.

Financed by EMI Films, Tender Mercies was shot largely in Waxahachie, Texas. The script was rejected by several American directors before the Australian Beresford accepted it. Duvall, who sang his own songs in the film, drove more than 600 miles (1,000 km) throughout the state, tape recording local accents and playing in country music bands to prepare for the role. He and Beresford repeatedly clashed during production, at one point prompting the director to walk off the set and reportedly consider quitting the film.

The film encompasses several themes, including the importance of love and family, the possibility of spiritual resurrection amid death and the concept of redemption through Mac Sledge's conversion to Christianity. Following poor test screening results, distributor Universal Pictures made little effort to publicise Tender Mercies, which Duvall attributed to the studio's lack of understanding of country music.

The film was released on March 4, 1983, in a limited number of theatres. Although unsuccessful at the box office, it was critically acclaimed and earned five Academy Award nominations, including for Best Picture. At the 56th Academy Awards, Tender Mercies won Oscars for Best Original Screenplay for Foote and Duvall won the Academy Award for Best Actor.

== Plot ==
Washed-up, alcoholic country singer-songwriter Mac Sledge awakens at a run-down Texas roadside motel and gas station after a night of heavy drinking. He meets the owner, a young widow named Rosa Lee, and offers to perform maintenance work there in exchange for a room. Rosa, whose husband died in the Vietnam War, is raising her young son, Sonny, on her own. She agrees to let Mac stay on condition that he does not drink while working. During quiet evenings, they sit alone and share parts of their life stories.

Mac resolves to give up alcohol and start his life anew. After enough days of keeping his word and doing his work, he is comfortable enough in his new life that he and Rosa Lee wed. They start attending a Baptist church on a regular basis. A newspaper reporter eventually visits the motel and asks Mac whether he has stopped recording music and if he has deliberately chosen to lead an anonymous life. When Mac refuses to answer, the reporter explains he is writing a story about him and has interviewed his ex-wife, Dixie Scott, a country music star who is performing nearby.

After the story is published, the neighbourhood learns of Mac's past, and members of a local country–western band visit him to show their respect. Despite greeting them politely, Mac remains reluctant to open up about his past. Later, he secretly attends Dixie's concert. She passionately sings songs that Mac wrote years earlier, and he leaves in the middle of the performance. Backstage, he talks to Dixie's manager, his old friend, Harry. Mac gives him a copy of a new song he has written and asks him to show it to Dixie. Mac tries to talk to Dixie, who becomes angry on seeing him and warns him to stay away from their 18-year-old daughter, Sue Anne.

Upon returning home, Mac assures Rosa Lee that he no longer has any feelings for Dixie, telling her that Dixie is "poison." Later, Harry visits Mac to tell him, seemingly at Dixie's urging, that the country music business has changed and his new song is no good. Hurt and angry, Mac drives away and nearly crashes the truck. He buys a bottle of whiskey, but returning home to a worried Rosa Lee and Sonny, he tells them he poured it out. He says he tried to leave Rosa Lee, but found he could not. Mac and Sonny are later baptised together in Rosa Lee's church.

Eventually, Sue Anne visits Mac—their first encounter since she was a child. Mac asks whether she got any of his letters, and she says her mother kept them from her. She also reports that Dixie tried to keep her from visiting Mac, and that, despite her mother's objections, she is eloping with her boyfriend. Mac admits that he used to hit Dixie and that she divorced him after he tried to kill her in a drunken rage. Sue Anne asks whether Mac remembers a song about a dove he sang to her when she was a baby. He claims he does not, but after she leaves, he sings to himself the hymn "On the Wings of a Dove".

I don't know why I wandered out to this part of Texas drunk, and you took me in and pitied me and helped me to straighten out, marry me. Why? Why did that happen? Is there a reason that happened? And Sonny's daddy died in the war, my daughter killed in an automobile accident. Why? See, I don't trust happiness. I never did; I never will.

— Mac, to Rosa Lee

Boys at school bully Sonny about his dead father. Meanwhile, the members of the local country band ask Mac permission to perform one of his songs, and he agrees. Mac begins performing with them, and they make plans to record together. His newfound happiness is interrupted when Sue Anne dies in a car crash. Mac attends his daughter's funeral at Dixie's lavish home in Nashville and comforts her when she breaks down.

Back home, Mac keeps quiet about his emotional pain, but wonders aloud to Rosa Lee why his once sorry existence has been given meaning, and, on the other hand, his daughter has died. Throughout his mourning, Mac continues his new life with Rosa Lee and Sonny. Sonny eventually finds a football that Mac has left as a gift for him. Mac is watching the motel from a field across the road, singing the hymn to himself. Sonny thanks him for the football, and the two play catch together as Rosa Lee watches them through a window.

== Cast ==
- Robert Duvall as Mac Sledge
- Tess Harper as Rosa Lee
- Betty Buckley as Dixie
- Wilford Brimley as Harry
- Ellen Barkin as Sue Anne
- Allan Hubbard as Sonny
- Lenny Von Dohlen as Robert
- Paul Gleason as Reporter
- Michael Crabtree as Lewis Menefee
- Norman Bennett as Reverend Hotchkiss

== Production ==
=== Writing ===
Playwright Horton Foote's interest in filmmaking was dependent the condition that he maintain some degree of control over the final product. He said of this stage in his career, "I learned that film really should be like theatre in the sense that, in theatre, the writer is, of course, very dominant ... If we don't like something, we can speak our minds. ... It is always a collaborative effort. ... But in Hollywood it wasn't so. A writer there has in his contract that you are a writer for hire, which means that you write a script, then it belongs to them." This renewed interest in cinema prompted Foote to write Tender Mercies, his first work written specifically for the screen. In the view of biographer George Terry Barr, the script reflected "Foote's determination to battle a Hollywood system that generally refuses to make such personal films."

The story was inspired partially by Foote's nephew, who struggled to succeed in the country music business. Foote was initially interested in writing a film based on his nephew's efforts to organise a band, which he saw as paralleling his own youthful attempts to find work as an actor. During his research, however, he met an experienced musician who had offered to help his nephew's band, and Foote found himself growing more interested in a story about him, rather than the band itself. Foote said, "This older man had been through it all. As I thought about a storyline, I got very interested in that type of character." The moment in the film where a woman asks, "Were you really Mac Sledge?" and he responds, "Yes ma'am, I guess I was," was based on an exchange that Foote overheard between a washed-up star and a fan. Foote said the entire film pivots on that statement, which he believed spoke volumes about Mac's personality and former status.

Foote based Sledge's victory over alcoholism on his observations of theatre people struggling with the problem. He sought to avoid a melodramatic slant in telling that aspect of the story. Foote described his protagonist as "a very hurt, damaged man ... silence was his weapon". He chose the title Tender Mercies, from the Book of Psalms, for its relation to the Rosa Lee character, who he said seeks only "certain moments of gentleness or respite, [not] grandness or largeness". Foote sought to portray each character as realistic and flawed, but not unsympathetic. Although the script conveyed a strong spiritual message with religious undertones, Foote felt it was important to balance those religious elements with a focus on the practical challenges of everyday life.

Film historian Gary Edgerton said the Tender Mercies script "catapulted Horton Foote into the most active professional period in his life." Film director and producer Alan J. Pakula credited the script with helping define the American independent film movement of the late 1980s by initiating a trend of personal filmmaking that often looks beyond Hollywood conventions.

=== Development ===
Duvall, who had appeared in To Kill a Mockingbird (1962), which Foote adapted from the Harper Lee novel, was involved in Tender Mercies as an actor and co-producer from its earliest stages. He said the script appealed to him because of the basic values it underlined and because the themes were universal even though the story was local. Duvall felt it portrayed people from the central region of the United States without parodying them, as he said many Hollywood films tend to do. Duvall's early involvement led to rumors that he had requested Foote write the script for him, something that both men denied.

Foote took the script to Philip and Mary Ann Hobel, a married couple who ran Antron Media Production and had produced more than 200 documentaries between them. Foote felt their background in documentaries would lend Tender Mercies the authenticity he and Duvall were seeking. The Hobels agreed to produce it after reading and liking the script; it would become their feature film debut as producers. The Hobels approached EMI Films, a British film and television production company, which agreed to provide financing for Tender Mercies as long as Duvall remained involved, and under the condition the Hobels find a good director. The script was rejected by many American directors, creating concerns for Foote and the producers that the film would never be made. Foote later said, "This film was turned down by every American director on the face of the globe." The Hobels eventually mailed the script to Australian director Bruce Beresford because they were impressed by his 1980 film Breaker Morant. Philip Hobel said, "What we saw in Breaker Morant is what we like as filmmakers ourselves — an attention to the environment, a straightforward presentation; it's almost a documentary approach."

Beresford was attracted to the idea of making a Hollywood film with a big budget and powerful distribution. Following his success with Breaker Morant, Beresford received about 150 Hollywood scripts as potential projects; although he went weeks before reading many of them, Beresford read Tender Mercies right away. It immediately appealed to him, in part because it dealt with aspects of American rural life he had seldom encountered in film scripts. Several of those involved with Tender Mercies had reservations about an Australian directing a film about a country music star. Beresford also found the decision strange, but kept his thoughts to himself because of his desire to direct the film. He contacted EMI Films and asked for one month to visit Texas and familiarize himself with the state before committing to direct, to which the company agreed. Beresford said of the trip, "I want to come over and see if this is all true, because if it's not really a true picture of what it's all like, it wouldn't be right to make it." During his visit to Texas, he saw parallels between the state and his homeland: the terrain reminded him of the Australian bush country, and the Texans he met in the isolated areas reminded him of residents of the Outback. He met Foote and discussed the script with him. The screenwriter, who gave Beresford tours of small Texas towns, felt the director's Australian background made him sensitive to the story's rural characters and would help him achieve the sought-for authenticity. Beresford agreed to direct and was hired after receiving final approval from Duvall (the actor had a clause in his contract allowing him such approval, the first time he had this power on a film).

The central setting of Tender Mercies was chosen largely due to the lack of physical structures in the barren landscape around it. A sense of loneliness was crucial to how director Bruce Beresford wanted to tell the story.

The film was given a budget of $4.5 million ($15,936,127 in 2025 dollars), modest by Hollywood standards at the time. Philip Hobel said it took about a year to secure the financing from EMI Films, whose major 1981 release, Honky Tonk Freeway, had done poor box office. For the primary location, Rosa Lee's home and motel/gas station business, Beresford imposed one requirement: that no other buildings or large manmade structures be visible from it. The filmmakers eventually decided on a property that had been sitting abandoned by a Waxahachie highway. Mary Ann Hobel said the owner, when approached about its availability, immediately handed over the keys: "We said, 'Don't you want a contract, something in writing?' And he said, 'We don't do things that way here.'"

Beresford, known for carefully planning every shot in his films, drew his own storyboards as well as detailed drawings of how he envisioned the sets. Jeannine Oppewall was hired as art director. Beresford praised her as "absolutely brilliant", especially for her attention to very small details, "going from the curtains to the color of the quilts on the floors." It was Oppewall who named the motel Mariposa, Spanish for "butterfly", which symbolizes the spiritual resurrection Mac Sledge would experience there. Beresford chose Australian Russell Boyd as cinematographer and Irishman William Anderson, who had worked on all of the director's previous features, as editor. He selected Elizabeth McBride as costume designer. It was her first time in the position on a feature film, and she went on to build a reputation for costuming Texan and other Southern characters.

=== Casting ===
Tess Harper as Rosa Lee, Robert Duvall as Mac Sledge, and Allan Hubbard as Sonny, in costumes designed by Elizabeth McBride

Duvall had always wanted to play a country singer, and Foote was rumored to have written the role of Mac Sledge specifically for him. Foote denied the claim, claiming he found it too constraining to write roles for specific actors, although he did hope Duvall would be cast in the part. Tender Mercies became a very important personal project for Duvall, who contributed a significant number of ideas for his character.

Duvall was the first choice of director Robert Altman for the role of country superstar Haven Hamilton (subsequently played by Henry Gibson) in his 1975 film Nashville, but was not in the film due to a scheduling conflict. Reportedly, Duvall dropped out of the movie when Altman would not let him sing his own compositions.

In preparing for the role, he spent weeks roaming around Texas, speaking to strangers to find the right accent and mannerisms. He also joined a small country band and continued singing with them every free weekend while the film was being shot. In total, Duvall drove about 680 miles (1,094 km) to research the part, often asking people to speak into his tape recorder so he could practice their inflections and other vocal habits. Upon finding one man with the exact accent he wanted, Duvall had him recite the entire script into the recorder.

Tess Harper was performing on stage in Texas when she attended a casting call for a minor role in the film. Beresford was so impressed with her that he cast her in the lead. He later said that the actresses he had seen before her demonstrated a sophistication and worldliness inappropriate for the part, while she brought a kind of rural quality without coming across as simple or foolish. Beresford said of Harper, "She walked into the room and even before she spoke, I thought, 'That's the girl to play the lead.'" Harper said she knew she won the role when Beresford appeared on her doorstep with a bottle of champagne in each hand. Tender Mercies was Harper's feature film debut, and she was so excited about the role she bit her script to make sure it was real. When filming ended, Duvall gave her a blue cowgirl shirt as a gift with a card that read, "You really were Rosa Lee".

Beresford visited several schools and auditioned many children for the role of Sonny before he came across Allan Hubbard in Paris, Texas. Beresford said Hubbard, like Harper, was chosen based on a simple, rural quality he possessed. The boy was able to relate easily to the character because, like Sonny, his father died at an early age; later, some media reports falsely claimed that his father was killed during the Vietnam War, just as Sonny's was in the film's backstory. None of the filmmakers knew Hubbard's father had died until after filming began. Duvall developed a strong, trusting relationship with Hubbard, which Foote felt improved the duo's on-screen chemistry. Hubbard would often play guitar with Duvall during breaks from filming.

Betty Buckley attended a casting session in New York City and was chosen largely based on the quality of her singing voice; Beresford said that few of the actresses who auditioned for the role were able to sing. Buckley was originally from Fort Worth, Texas, near the Grapevine Opry; when her concert scenes were filmed there, her whole family participated as extras. Duvall said he thought Buckley perfectly conveyed the underlying frustration of a country singer and "brought a real zing to [the] part." The actual location of the bar scenes was in Seven Points, Texas, in a club called the Cedar Creek Opry House. Seven Points is just east of Ellis County, across the Trinity River in western Henderson County, Texas. The Opry House as it was known then, was a two-story building that used to be a skating rink in its earlier life. The old rink was upstairs and became the dance floor of the Opry House, where the concert and bar scenes were filmed. One scene of the movie shows the front of the building with its name visible.

Ellen Barkin was cast after impressing Beresford during a New York audition. At the time, she had appeared only in television movies; Diner, her feature film debut, was not yet in theaters. When filming on Diner wrapped, Barkin joked to her agent about future roles, "No more troubled teenagers, unless the movie is with Robert De Niro, Robert Duvall or Robert Redford." Duvall said of Barkin, "She brings a real credibility for that part, plus she was young and attractive and had a certain sense of edge, a danger for her that was good for that part." Some media outlets reported that Duvall and Barkin were involved romantically for a brief time during filming.

Wilford Brimley was cast at the urging of his good friend Duvall, who was not getting along well with Beresford and wanted "somebody down here that's on my side, somebody that I can relate to". Beresford felt Brimley was too old for the part, but eventually agreed to the casting.

=== Filming ===
Much of Tender Mercies was filmed in Waxahachie (pictured), the county seat of Ellis County, Texas.

Most of Tender Mercies was filmed in Waxahachie and Palmer, two towns in Ellis County in north central Texas. Beresford largely avoided the Victorian architecture and other picturesque elements of Waxahachie and instead focused on relatively barren locations more characteristic of West Texas. The town portrayed in the film is never identified by name. Foote said when he wrote the script he did not have the same isolated and lonely vision for the setting Beresford did, but he felt the atmosphere the director captured served the story well.

Principal photography took place between November 2 and December 23, 1981. The plants used in the gardening scenes were brought inside at night to keep them from freezing. Due to the tight schedule, the cast and crew worked seven days a week with very long hours each day. Although the Australian filmmakers and the crew, who were mostly from Dallas, got along very well both on and off the set, Beresford and Duvall were at odds during the production. Beresford, in his usual approach, meticulously planned each scene, and Duvall, who preferred a free-form give-and-take on set, felt restricted by the director's methods. Although Duvall regularly acknowledged his talent as a director, he said of Beresford, "He has this dictatorial way of doing things with me that just doesn't cut it. Man, I have to have my freedom." Although he had no problem with Duvall's acting methodology, the actor's temperament infuriated Beresford. While filming one scene with Harper and Barkin, he became so frustrated during a phone conversation with Duvall that he said, "Well if you want to direct the film, go right ahead," and walked off the set. Beresford flew to New York and reportedly was ready to quit, until Duvall flew out to speak with him. After further arguments, the two made amends and returned to work on the film.

Beresford also clashed on set with Brimley. On the very first day of filming, he asked the actor to "pick up the pace", prompting Brimley to reply, "Hey, I didn't know anybody dropped it." On another occasion, when Beresford tried to advise Brimley on how Harry would behave, Duvall recalled Brimley responding, "Now look, let me tell you something, I'm Harry. Harry's not over there, Harry's not over here. Until you fire me or get another actor, I'm Harry, and whatever I do is fine 'cause I'm Harry." Duvall said he believed the on-set wrangling resulted in a combination of the director's and actors' visions and ultimately improved the picture. Likewise, Beresford said he did not feel the fights negatively affected the film because he and Duvall never disagreed on the interpretation of the Mac Sledge character.

Harper described the extent to which Duvall inhabited his character: "Someone once said to me, 'Well, how's Robert Duvall?' and I said, 'I don't know Robert Duvall. I know Mac Sledge very well.'" Beresford, too, said the transformation was so believable that he could feel his skin crawling up the back of his neck the first day of filming. Duvall made an effort to help Harper, who was making her film debut. While preparing to shoot a scene in which Mac and Rosa Lee fight, he yelled at a make-up artist in front of Harper to make her angry and fuel her performance; he apologized to the make-up artist after the scene was shot.

Cinematographer Russell Boyd largely used available light to give the movie a natural feel, which Beresford said was crucial to its sense of authenticity. Harper said Boyd was so quiet during filming that he mostly used just three words: "'Yeah', 'right' and 'sure'". Beresford, Foote and Duvall considered the climactic scene to be the one in which Mac, tending the family garden, discusses with Rosa Lee his pain over his daughter's death. Beresford and Boyd filmed the scene in a long take and long shot so it could flow uninterrupted, with the lonely Texas landscape captured in the background. When studio executives received the footage, they contacted Beresford and requested close-up shots be intercut, but he insisted on keeping the long take intact. Duvall said he felt the scene underscored Mac's stoicism in the face of tragedy and loss.

=== Music ===
"If You'll Hold the Ladder (I'll Climb to the Top)", performed by Robert Duvall in Tender Mercies
Robert Duvall insisted on singing his own songs in Tender Mercies.

"Over You", performed by Betty Buckley in Tender Mercies
"Over You" was nominated for an Academy Award for Best Song.

Tender Mercies includes no original film score, and the musical soundtrack is limited to the performances of country songs and the acoustic guitar playing that occur as part of the story. A score was composed for the movie, but Beresford had it removed because he felt it was "too sweet" and sounded phony in the context of the film, although he acknowledged it as "very skillful". Duvall sang his own songs, a right he insisted be part of his contract. He commented, "What's the point if you're not going to do your own [singing]? They're just going to dub somebody else? I mean, there's no point to that." The film's financial backers were initially concerned about whether he could sing well enough for the role. Those concerns were allayed after Duvall produced a tape of himself singing a cappella "On the Wings of a Dove", a Bob Ferguson country song featured in the film. Duvall collaborated with Beresford in deciding on the unusual staging of the emotional scene in which Mac sings it after reflecting on the reunion with his daughter. The song is performed with Mac looking out a window with his back to the camera, his face unseen. Horton Foote thought the choice made the scene more moving and called it "an extraordinary moment" in the film. Duvall wrote two of Mac's other songs, "Fool's Waltz" and "I've Decided to Leave Here Forever". Several leading country singers, including Willie Nelson, George Jones and Merle Haggard, were believed to have inspired Mac and Duvall's portrayal of him, but Duvall insisted the character was not based on anyone in particular. Another country star, Waylon Jennings, complimented his performance, saying he had "done the impossible."

Betty Buckley also sang her own songs, one of which, "Over You", written by Austin Roberts and Bobby Hart, was nominated for an Academy Award. Although Buckley performed it in the film, country singer Lane Brody was chosen to record it for radio release, and Mac Davis later sang it at the 1984 Academy Awards ceremony. Other songs in the film include "It Hurts to Face Reality" by Lefty Frizzell, "If You'll Hold the Ladder (I'll Climb to the Top)" by Buzz Rabin and Sara Busby, "The Best Bedroom in Town" and "Champagne Ladies & Barroom Babies" by Charlie Craig, "I'm Drinkin' Canada Dry" by Johnny Cymbal and Austin Roberts, and "You Are What Love Means To Me" by Craig Bickhardt.

Side 1
No.	Title	Writer(s)	Length
1.	"Off on Wednesdays" (Charlie Craig featuring Shirley Grooms)	Charlie Craig	3:08
2.	"If You'll Hold the Ladder (I'll Climb to the Top)" (Robert Duvall)	Buzz Rabin, Sara Busby	2:53
3.	"It Hurts to Face Reality" (Duvall)	Lefty Frizzell	2:27
4.	"Makin' Love and Makin' Out" (Craig)	Craig	2:46
5.	"Overnight Sensations" (Craig Bickhardt)	Craig Bickhardt and Eli Fries	3:37

Side 2
No.	Title	Writer(s)	Length
1.	"Midnight Tennessee Woman" (Charlie Craig)	Charlie Craig	2:38
2.	"Over You" (Lane Brody)	Austin Roberts, Bobby Hart	2:58
3.	"I've Decided to Leave Here Forever" (Duvall)	Duvall	4:15
4.	"Wings of a Dove" (Duvall and Gail Youngs)	Bob Ferguson	3:09
5.	"You Are What Love Means to Me" (Bickhardt)	Bickhardt	4:17

== Themes and interpretations ==
=== Love and family ===
The grace comes quietly to Sledge, and by surprise and stealth, seeping down deep to shelter and then transform the violent "man who was once Mac Sledge," as the movie puts it. Ultimately, Sledge finds not blankness by love, itself mysterious and inscrutable, a reality that counters the emptiness he has known. Only a few films have managed to capture the gentle quiet splendor by which love, against all odds in this dark world, makes itself known.

— Roy M. Anker, Catching Light: Looking for God in the Movies

Mac Sledge finds redemption largely through his relationship and eventual marriage with Rosa Lee. This is in keeping with the motif of fidelity common in the works of Foote, inspired, said the writer, by his marriage to Lillian Vallish Foote. He told The New York Times that she "kept me goin'. She never lost faith, and that's a rare thing. I don't know now how we got through it, but we got through it." The lyrics of "If You'll Hold the Ladder", which Mac performs with his new country band in the second half of the film, suggest what love has done for him. He sings of someone holding the ladder for him as he climbs to the top; this is symbolic of Rosa's love and guidance, which has allowed Sledge to improve himself and build a new life. The desultory romances that defined his past are represented by the more promiscuous lyrics of Dixie Scott's songs, such as those of "The Best Bedroom in Town": "The best part of all / the room at the end of the hall / That's where you and me make everything alright ... We celebrate the happiness we've found / Every night in the best bedroom in town". His storming out of her concert symbolizes his rejection of that earlier life. In contrast, Rosa Lee sings the humble church hymn, "Jesus, Savior, Pilot Me". In a related way, the film emphasizes the importance of the woman's role in domestic life - although Mac takes on the role of patriarch in his new family setting, it is only through the support and care of Rosa Lee that he is able to settle into this role. Sociologist Norman K. Denzin points out that Tender Mercies embodies many of the ideas of recovery from addiction that are part of the twelve-step program used by Alcoholics Anonymous. Both the film and the support group's program advocate the idea of hitting rock-bottom, making a decision to stop drinking, dealing with the past and adopting a spiritual way of life.

Tender Mercies also emphasizes the father–child theme common in the works of Foote, a theme that operates on both transcendent and temporal levels. Mac is reunited not only with his spiritual father through his conversion to Christianity, but also with his biological daughter, Sue Anne, when she pays him a surprise visit. Scholar Rebecca Luttrell Briley suggests that although Mac begins to plant new roots with Rosa Lee and Sonny in earlier scenes, they are not enough to fully satisfy his desire for redemption, as he is nearly driven to leave the family and return to his alcoholic ways. According to Briley, Sue Anne's visit prompts Mac to realize that reconciliation with her and a reformation of their father–daughter relationship is the ingredient that had been lacking in his quest for redemption. This is further demonstrated by Mac's singing "On the Wings of a Dove" to himself after their meeting; the lyrics describe God the Father and God the Holy Spirit's involvement in the baptism of God the Son, the Lord Jesus Christ. This connects Sledge's spiritual reconciliation with the divine, to the earthly reconciliation with his own child. However, the death of Sue Anne also demonstrates that, according to Briley, "all relationships cannot be mended, some by choice and some by chance, and the poignancy of missed opportunities between fathers and their children on this earth is underlined in this scene."

The relationship between Mac and Sonny, whose name derives from "son", is central to the film's exploration of the father–child theme. Sonny tries to conjure an image of his biological father, whom he never had the chance to know, through old photographs, his mother's memories and visits to his father's grave. Sonny finds a father figure in Mac. When another young boy asks Sonny if he likes Mac more than his real father, Sonny says that he does, because he never knew the other man; Briley says that this "emphasizes the distinction between companionship and blood relationship Foote has pointed out before." The final scene, in which Mac and Sonny play catch with a football Mac bought him as a gift, symbolizes the fact that, although Mac has lost the chance to reconcile with his daughter, he now has a second chance at establishing a father–child relationship with Sonny. The father–child theme also plays out through Mac's relationship with the young band members, who say that he has been an inspiration to them, playing a paternal role in their lives before they even met him. Sledge eventually teams up with the musicians, offering them fatherly counsel in a much more direct way.

=== Religion ===
Mac's redemption and self-improvement run parallel with his conversion to Christianity. Briley argues that "the emphasis on the Christian family is stronger in this script than in any other Foote piece to this point." At the urging of Rosa Lee, Mac begins to attend church regularly and is eventually baptized, along with Sonny. During a church scene, he also sings the hymn "Jesus, Savior, Pilot Me", which serves as a symbol for his new direction in life. After they are baptized, Sonny asks Mac whether he feels any different, to which Mac responds, "Not yet." According to scholars, this response indicates Mac's belief that his reunion with God will lead to meaningful changes in his life. It is after this moment, Briley points out, that Mac is able to forge other relationships, such as those with his young bandmates, and "develop his own potential for success as a man." Briley also proposes that Mac's response — "Yes, ma'am, I guess I was" — to a fan who asks if he was really Mac Sledge suggests that he has washed away his old self through baptism.

During one scene, Rosa Lee tells Mac, "I say my prayers for you and when I thank the Lord for his tender mercies, Sonny and you are at the head of the list." Scholar Robert Jewett compares this line to the first verse of Romans 12, in which Paul the Apostle appeals to Christians to live out their lives in service to others "through the mercies of God". Many of the elements of Mac's redemption, conversion to Christianity and budding relationship with Rosa Lee occur off-camera, including their wedding. Jewett writes, "This is perfectly congruent with the theme of faith in the hidden mercies of God, the secret plot of the life of faith in Romans. ... It is a matter of faith, elusive and intangible." Jewett compares Mac's story to that of Abraham, because "just like Sledge's story, [it] centers on the provision of a future through the tender mercies of God". As told in Romans 4, Abraham and his wife Sarah are too old to produce a son, but Abraham develops the faith that God will provide them an heir, which is exactly what occurs, though — as Paul describes — Abraham did nothing practical to guarantee or deserve such a miracle. Jewett describes Mac as similarly undeserving of redemption, based on his selfish and abusive past, typified by his condition in his first encounter with Rosa Lee: in a drunken stupor following a motel room fight. She takes him in and eventually falls in love with him, despite his having done nothing to deserve her care or his redemption: "It is an undeserved grace, a gift of providence from a simple woman who continues to pray for him and to be grateful for him."

However, in the face of the loss of his daughter, Mac learns, in Briley's words, that "his life as a Christian is no more sheltered from this world's tragedies than it was before." Before finding redemption, Sledge questions why God has allowed his life to take the path it has and, in particular, why his daughter was killed instead of him. Commentators have described this as a prime example of theodicy, the question of why evil exists that is commonly faced by Christians. Scholar Richard Leonard writes, "For all believers, the meaning of suffering is the universal question. ... No answer is completely satisfying, least of all the idea that God sends bad events to teach us something." Following the death of his daughter, Mac moves forward with uncertainty as the film ends. Jewett writes of this conclusion, "The message of this film is that we have no final assurances, any more than Abraham did. But we can respond in faith to the tender mercies we have received."

=== Death and resurrection ===
When his newly recovered relationship with Sue Anne is cut short by an automobile accident that takes her life, Mac quickly realizes that his life as a Christian is no more sheltered from this world's tragedies than it was before. Foote intimates that all relationships cannot be mended, some by choice and some by chance, and the poignancy of missed opportunities between fathers and their children on this earth is underlined in this scene.

— Rebecca Luttrell Briley, You Can Go Home Again: The Focus on Family in the Works of Horton Foote

Mac experiences his spiritual resurrection even as he wrestles with death, in both the past—Sonny's father in the Vietnam War—and present—his own daughter in a car accident. The latter threatens to derail Mac's new life, captured in the moment when he learns of it and turns off the radio that is playing his new song. Leonard writes of this resurrection, "Depression hangs like a pall over Tender Mercies, [but] what makes this film inspiring is that it is also about the joy of being found. ... Mac finds the way, the truth, and the life he wants." In a climactic scene, Mac tells Rosa Lee that he was once nearly killed in a car crash himself, which forces him to address the question of why he was allowed to live while others have died. Jewett writes of this scene, "Mac Sledge can't trust happiness because it remains inexplicable. But he does trust the tender mercies that mysteriously led him from death to life."

Mac is portrayed as near death at the beginning of the film, having woken up in a drunken stupor in a boundless, empty flatland with nothing in his possession, a shot that scholar Roy M. Anker said "pointedly reflects the condition of his own soul". The dialogue in other scenes suggests the threat of mortality, including a moment when Mac has trouble singing due to his bad voice and says, "Don't feel sorry for me, Rosa Lee, I'm not dead yet." In several lasting shots, the vast sky dwarfs Mac, Rosa Lee and Sonny, starkly symbolizing their isolation, as well as the fragility of human existence. The fact that Mac sustains his newfound life with Rosa Lee and Sonny after his daughter's death, rather than reverting to his old pattern of alcoholism and abuse, is consistent with a recurring theme in Foote's works of characters overcoming tragedy and finding in it an opportunity for growth and maturation.

== Release ==
=== Distribution ===
Philip and Mary Ann Hobel spent a long time seeking a distributor for Tender Mercies without any success. Duvall, who began to doubt the film would be widely released, was unable to help the Hobels because he was busy trying to find a distributor for Angelo My Love, a film he had written, directed and produced. Eventually, Universal Pictures agreed to distribute Tender Mercies. Test screenings for the film were held, which Beresford described as the most unusual he had ever experienced. The director said that the preview audiences appeared to be very engaged with the picture, to the point the theaters were so silent, "if you flicked a piece of paper on the floor, you could hear it fall." However, the post-screening feedback was, in Beresford's words, "absolutely disastrous." As a result, Universal executives lost faith in the film and made little effort to promote it. Foote said of the studio, "I don't know that they disliked the film, I just think they thought it was inconsequential and of no consequence at all. I guess they thought it would just get lost in the shuffle." Others in the film industry were equally dismissive; one Paramount Pictures representative described the picture as "like watching paint dry".

=== Festivals and theatrical run ===
Tender Mercies was released on March 4, 1983, in only three theaters: one in New York City, one in Los Angeles, and one in Chicago. New York Times critic Vincent Canby observed that it was released during "the time of year when distributors usually get rid of all of those movies they don't think are worth releasing in the prime moviegoing times of Christmas and the midsummer months". The simultaneous release of Angelo My Love led to some more publicity for Duvall himself, but was of no help to Tender Mercies. Duvall also believed that Universal's lack of familiarity and comfort with southern culture and the country music genre further reduced their faith in the film. When country star Willie Nelson offered to help publicize it, a studio executive told Duvall she did not understand how the singer could contribute to the promotion, which Duvall said was indicative of the studio's failure to understand both the film and the country music genre.

Tender Mercies was shown in competition at the 1983 Cannes Film Festival, where it was described as a relatively optimistic alternative to darker, more violent entries like One Deadly Summer, Moon in the Gutter and Merry Christmas, Mr. Lawrence. It was also shown at the 1983 International Film Festival of India in New Delhi. A jury headed by director Lindsay Anderson determined that none of the films in contention, including Tender Mercies, were good enough to win the Golden Peacock, the festival's top prize. Film critic Jugu Abraham said the jury's standards were higher than those of the Academy Awards, and that Tender Mercies' lack of success at the festival was a "clear example of what is good cinema for some, not being so good for others".

=== Home media ===
Following its brief theatrical run, Universal Pictures quickly sold the film's rights to cable companies, allowing Tender Mercies to be shown on television. When the film unexpectedly received five Academy Award nominations nearly a year after its original release, the studio attempted to redistribute the film to theaters; however, the cable companies began televising the film about a week before the Oscar ceremony, which essentially halted any attempts at a theatrical re-release. When the film first played on HBO in March 1984, it surpassed the three major networks in ratings for homes with cable televisions. Tender Mercies was released on VHS some time later, and was first released on DVD on June 22, 1999.

== Reception ==
=== Box office ===
Tender Mercies was not considered a box office success. In its first three days, March 4–6, the film grossed $46,977 from exclusive engagements at the Tower East Theater in New York ($21,183), the Fine Arts Theater in Los Angeles ($18,254) and the Carnegie Theater in Chicago ($7,540). Tender Mercies eventually played at a total of 37 theaters and grossed $8,443,124.

=== Critical response ===
The excitement of Tender Mercies lies below the surface. It's not the quick charge of fast action, flashy performances, or eye-zapping cuts. Rather, it's something much more rare — the thrill of watching characters grow, personalities deepen, relationships ripen and mature. It's the pleasure of rediscovering the dramatic richness of decency, honesty, compassion, and a few other qualities that have become rare visitors to the silver screen. It feels good to have them back again.

— David Sterritt, The Christian Science Monitor

Tender Mercies received mostly positive reviews. Richard Corliss of Time declared it the "best American movie of the new year". Carol Olten of The San Diego Union-Tribune declared Tender Mercies the best movie of 1983, and "the most poignant, but forthright, film of the year, with a brilliant performance by Robert Duvall". Janet Maslin of The New York Times wrote, "This is a small, lovely and somewhat overloaded film about small-town life, loneliness, country music, marriage, divorce and parental love, and it deals with all of these things in equal measure. Still, the absence of a single, sharply dramatic story line is a relatively small price to pay for the plainness and clarity with which these other issues are defined." She also praised Beresford's direction, which she said lent the movie a light touch. The Times' Canby wrote, "In all respects Tender Mercies is so good that it has the effect of rediscovering a kind of film fiction that has been debased over the decades by hack moviemakers, working according to accepted formulas, frequently to the applause of the critics as well as the public." Leonard Maltin gave it three out of four stars, applauding Duvall in particular and describing it as a "winning but extremely low-key film", though he characterized Foote's screenplay as "not so much a story as a series of vignettes". David Sterritt of The Christian Science Monitor praised the film for its values, for underscoring the good in people and for avoiding flashiness and quick cuts in favor of a subtle and deliberately paced story, while maintaining a PG rating and omitting sex, drugs and violence. He also felt, however, that it tended toward melodrama on a few occasions and that the soundtrack had "a bit of syrupy music ... especially at the end".

Some reviews were less favorable. David Ansen of Newsweek said, "While one respects the filmmaker's small-is-beautiful philosophy, this story may indeed be too small for its britches. ... Beresford's nice little movie seems so afraid to make a false move that it runs the danger of not moving at all." Linda Beath of The Globe and Mail said Duvall's performance was "fabulous," but that the film was "very slight" compared to Beresford's Australian pictures. Gary Arnold of The Washington Post panned the film, criticizing its mood and tempo and describing Buckley as its only true asset: "Tender Mercies fails because of an apparent dimness of perception that frequently overcomes dramatists: they don't always know when they've got ahold of the wrong end of the story they want to tell."

Many critics specifically praised Duvall's performance. Sterritt called it "one of the most finely wrought achievements to reach the screen in recent memory." In Corliss's description, "Duvall's aging face, a road map of dead ends and dry gulches, can accommodate rage or innocence or any ironic shade in between. As Mac he avoids both melodrama and condescension, finding climaxes in each small step toward rehabilitation, each new responsibility shouldered." Ansen said, "Robert Duvall does another of his extraordinary disappearing acts. He vanishes totally inside the character of Mac Sledge." Maslin said he "so thoroughly transformed into Mac that he even walks with a Texan's rolling gait"; she also complimented the performances of the supporting cast. According to a review in People, "Duvall gives it everything he has, which is saying a great deal. His beery singing voice is a revelation, and his unfussy, brightly burnished acting is the kind for which awards were invented." The review also described Betty Buckley as "bitchy and brilliant". Duvall was praised as well for pulling off his first true romantic role; the actor said of the response, "This is the only film where I've heard people say I'm sexy. It's real romantic. Rural romantic. I love that part almost more than anything."

Reflecting on the film a decade after it came out, critic Danny Peary said he found Duvall's restrained portrayal "extremely irritating" and criticized the entire cast, save for Buckley, for their "subdued, emotions-in-check, phony 'honest' performances. You just wish the whole lot of them would start tickling each other." In his book Alternate Oscars, listing his personal opinions of who should have won the Academy Awards each year, Peary excluded Tender Mercies from all the categories, and chose Michael Caine as deserving of the Best Actor honor for Educating Rita. In June 2009, critic Roger Ebert included Tender Mercies in The Great Movies, his series of reviews celebrating what he considers the most important films of all time. He praised what he called one of Duvall's most understated performances, as well as Foote's minimalist storytelling and the restraint and patience of Beresford's direction. Ebert said of Foote's screenplay, "The down-to-earth quality of his characters drew attention away from his minimalist storytelling; all the frills were stripped away. ... Rarely does a movie elaborate less and explain more than Tender Mercies."

On the review aggregator website Rotten Tomatoes, 83% of 29 critics' reviews are positive. The website's consensus reads: "Anchored by a deftly understated performance from Robert Duvall, Tender Mercies is a quiet character study that leaves a lasting emotional impact."

== Accolades ==
The 56th Academy Awards nominations were announced about 10 months after Tender Mercies was released. Little had been done to promote its candidacy: only four Oscar campaign advertisements were purchased; all of them appeared in the trade journal Variety, and Duvall had declined to campaign for himself or the film. Beresford and studio executives were surprised when the film was nominated for five Academy Awards, including Best Picture. Harper was believed by some to be a strong contender for either Best Actress or Best Supporting Actress, but ultimately she was nominated in neither category.

Duvall was the only American actor nominated for the Best Actor Oscar; his competition were Britons Michael Caine (who had co-starred with Duvall in the 1976 The Eagle Has Landed), Tom Conti, Tom Courtenay and Albert Finney. During an interview before the Oscar ceremony, Duvall offended some Britons by complaining about "the Limey syndrome," claiming "the attitude with a lot of people in Hollywood is that what they do in England is somehow better than what we do here." Duvall, who was presented with the Oscar by country music star, Dolly Parton, said of winning the award, "It was a nice feeling, knowing I was the home-crowd favorite." In a New York Times profile of Duvall that appeared six years after Tender Mercies' release, Nan C. Robertson wrote that, despite four previous Academy Award nominations, "it was not until he won as Best Actor in 1983 ... that moviegoers woke up in droves to this great natural resource. The reason was that they rarely recognized Mr. Duvall from one part to another, so effortlessly did he vanish into each celluloid persona." Foote, who was so certain he would not win the Best Adapted Screenplay Oscar for To Kill a Mockingbird he had not attended the 1963 ceremony, made sure he was present to collect his award for Best Original Screenplay. The critical success of the film allowed Foote to exercise considerable control over his future film projects, including final veto power over major decisions; when such power was denied, Foote would simply refuse to do the film.

Award	Category	Nominee(s)	Result
Academy Awards	Best Picture	Philip S. Hobel	Nominated
Academy Awards	Best Director	Bruce Beresford	Nominated
Academy Awards	Best Actor	Robert Duvall	Won
Academy Awards	Best Screenplay – Written Directly for the Screen	Horton Foote	Won
Academy Awards	Best Original Song	"Over You"; Music and Lyrics by Austin Roberts and Bobby Hart	Nominated
Cannes Film Festival	Palme d'Or	Bruce Beresford	Nominated
David di Donatello Awards	Best Foreign Actor	Robert Duvall	Nominated
Directors Guild of America Awards	Outstanding Directorial Achievement in Motion Pictures	Bruce Beresford	Nominated
Golden Globe Awards	Best Motion Picture – Drama		Nominated
Golden Globe Awards	Best Actor in a Motion Picture – Drama	Robert Duvall	Won (Note: Tied with Tom Courtenay for The Dresser.)
Golden Globe Awards	Best Supporting Actress – Motion Picture	Tess Harper	Nominated
Golden Globe Awards	Best Director – Motion Picture	Bruce Beresford	Nominated
Golden Globe Awards	Best Original Song – Motion Picture	"Over You"; Music and Lyrics by Austin Roberts and Bobby Hart	Nominated
Kansas City Film Critics Circle Awards	Best Film		Won (Note: Tied with Terms of Endearment.)
Kansas City Film Critics Circle Awards	Best Actor	Robert Duvall	Won
Los Angeles Film Critics Association Awards	Best Film		Runner-up
Los Angeles Film Critics Association Awards	Best Director	Bruce Beresford	Runner-up
Los Angeles Film Critics Association Awards	Best Actor	Robert Duvall	Won
National Board of Review Awards	Top Ten Films		3rd Place
National Society of Film Critics Awards	Best Actor	Robert Duvall	2nd Place
New York Film Critics Circle Awards	Best Actor	Robert Duvall	Won
Writers Guild of America Awards	Best Drama – Written Directly for the Screen	Horton Foote	Won
Young Artist Awards	Best Young Supporting Actor in a Motion Picture	Allan Hubbard	Nominated
