= John S. Samuels III =

American lawyer and coal magnate

- Born: John Stockwell Samuels III; September 15, 1933; Galveston, Texas, United States
- Died: October 2019 (aged 86); Dubai, United Arab Emirates
- Occupations: Lawyer, coal magnate

John Stockwell Samuels III (September 15, 1933 – October 2019) was an American lawyer and coal magnate.

Samuels was born in Galveston, Texas, the son of Helen Yvonne (Poole) and John Stockwell Samuels Jr. He graduated with a Bachelor of Economics from the Texas Agricultural and Mechanical University in 1954, and then went on to receive a Masters of Science in Economics from Texas A&M thereafter, before joining the army and being sent to language school to study Russian.

After being posted to Turkey, Samuels was discharged in 1957 and entered Harvard Law School, receiving his Juris Doctor in 1960. He began his career as an associate lawyer with Chadbourne, Parke, Whiteside & Wolff in New York City. In 1973, he and two others borrowed $4.5 million to buy Leckie Smokeless Coal company. Turbo-charged by the oil crisis, within just one year its profits had helped finance a corporate empire of some 16 entities, including 3 coal mines, 2 insurance agencies and a Wall Street bond firm. Their collective earnings for 1974 were reported at a whopping $50 million. By February 1979, Fortune magazine listed him among America's richest with assets valued at $200–300 million.

With his newfound wealth, he purchased five luxury homes and various expensive art pieces. Samuels owned an art-filled townhouse in Manhattan at 123 East 79th Street that he bought from Marietta Tree; a townhouse in London's Piccadilly; an estate at Southampton on Long Island; Salutation on Dosoris Island, the former Junius Spencer Morgan III estate also on Long Island; and, the League-Kempner House at 1702 Broadway in his native Galveston.

He also used his wealth to become a patron of the arts. By 1978, he had become Chairman of the New York City Center, the New York City Opera, the New York City Ballet Company, and the Vivian Beaumont Theater. By 1982, he had resigned from all his chairmanships.

By the 1990s, he had to file for bankruptcy and the only home he was left with was his Galveston property. He was living in Bahrain until his death in Dubai.

He married Ellen Richards with whom he had four children, including the actor, John Stockwell, and a daughter, Evelyn Welch, American art historian and the mother of Florence Welch, the lead singer of the band, Florence & the Machine. He separated from his wife in 1979 and moved in with his boyfriend in 1981 in New York City.

He died in October 2019.
