= Dosoris Island =

Island in Glen Cove, New York

West Island
- Interactive map of West Island

Geography
- Location: West Island, Glen Cove, New York
- Coordinates: 40°53′33″N 73°38′19″W

Administration
- United States

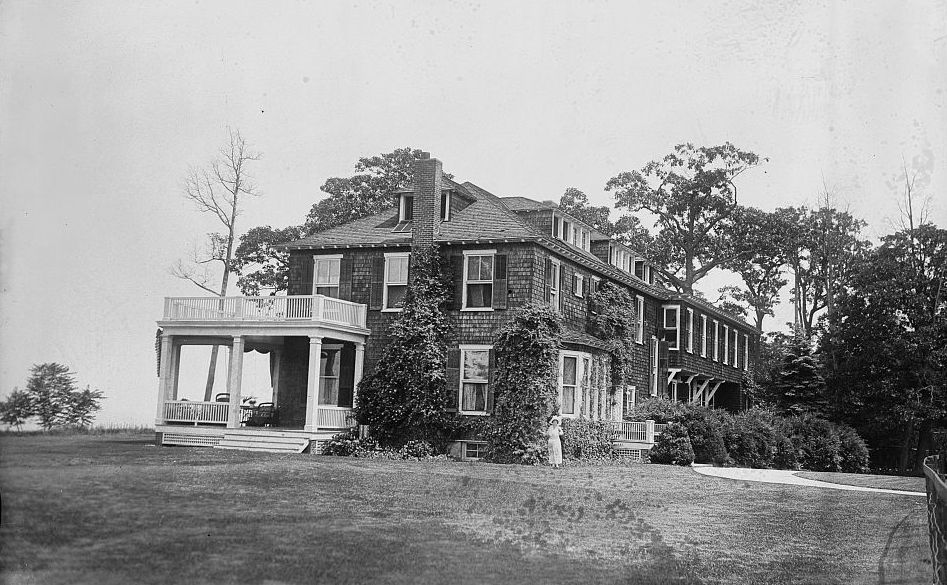
"Dosoris" Dana Estate c. 1915 – c. 1920

West Island is a 46-acre private island in Glen Cove, Long Island, New York. West Island, the official name of the island, was referred to as "Dosoris Island" up until around the year 1900. It has also unofficially been called Salutation Island, Dana's Island, and Cavalier Island at different points in time.

It is located on the North Shore of Long Island across from East Island and bordering the Long Island Sound.

General Nathaniel Coles Jr., a descendant of Robert Coles, bred the thoroughbred horse American Eclipse on West Island. American Eclipse was an undefeated American Thoroughbred racehorse in the early nineteenth century.

== History ==
The land was originally granted by King George I and purchased by Peter Caverley/Cavalier in 1721 for 200 pounds.

The home was passed down to Reverend Benjamin Woolsey of Southold, New York, from his wife, Abigail's father, John Taylor (who also acquired East Island). Both West and East Island became part of Reverend Woosley's farm, which he called ''Dosoris.''

In Latin, 'Dosoris' translates to 'Wife's Dowry,' so named by the Rev. Benjamin Woolsey for the house he built there in 1745 on the island that became his when he married Abigail Taylor. Rev. Benjamin Woosley died in 1756 and the property was passed down to his two sons, Benjamin and Colonel Melancthon Taylor Woolsey, however Colonel Woolsey would soon perish himself, being killed at Ticonderoga in the campaign against the French in the French and Indian War.

Brothers, Samuel and Steven Taber purchased West Island in 1857. On April 6, 1896, West Island was acquired by Charles A. Dana, editor and co-owner of the New York Sun, and under him, Dosoris became, "probably Long Island's most famous country place". He built his summer retreat there to years later, which he called "Wings". The land was partitioned by Dana's heirs upon his death.

=== Arboretum ===
Dana personally oversaw the transformation of West Island into a "world-renowned arboretum," with rare trees from America, Europe and Asia. Aside from bringing in America's pre-eminent landscape designer, Frederick Law Olmsted, to lay out a network of winding paths through which to enjoy this "fairyland of trees and flowers," Dana also brought in a specialist to live here year round whose job it was to acclimatize the foreign species. He welcomed arboriculturists from all over the country to study and admire what he planted here, including such unlikely and romantic specimens as the oaks grown from acorns found on the tomb of the ancient Chinese philosopher, Confucius.

The bucolic 'island'—that is all but an island except for a narrow causeway connecting it to the mainland—consists of 46 acres with a 28-acre pond. A contemporary write-up from 1889 described, "a seawall is built all around the island, and it is draped and festooned with Matrimony vine, our native Bitter-sweet, a Japanese species of the same genus, and Periploca Graeca, which are planted on top". Dana may have lived in the original house built by the Woolseys back in 1745, as his residence here was described as the, "large, old-fashioned frame house, in which he made his country home".

He died in 1897 and in 1905 his only son, Paul Dana (a member of Mrs Astor's hallowed "400"), divided the island into two properties. He kept the larger part for himself (31-acres) and sold off what remained (the 15-acres which included his father's old frame house) to William Lamon Harkness, of Cleveland, one of the heirs to the Standard Oil fortune.

=== Junius Spencer Morgan III and later owners ===
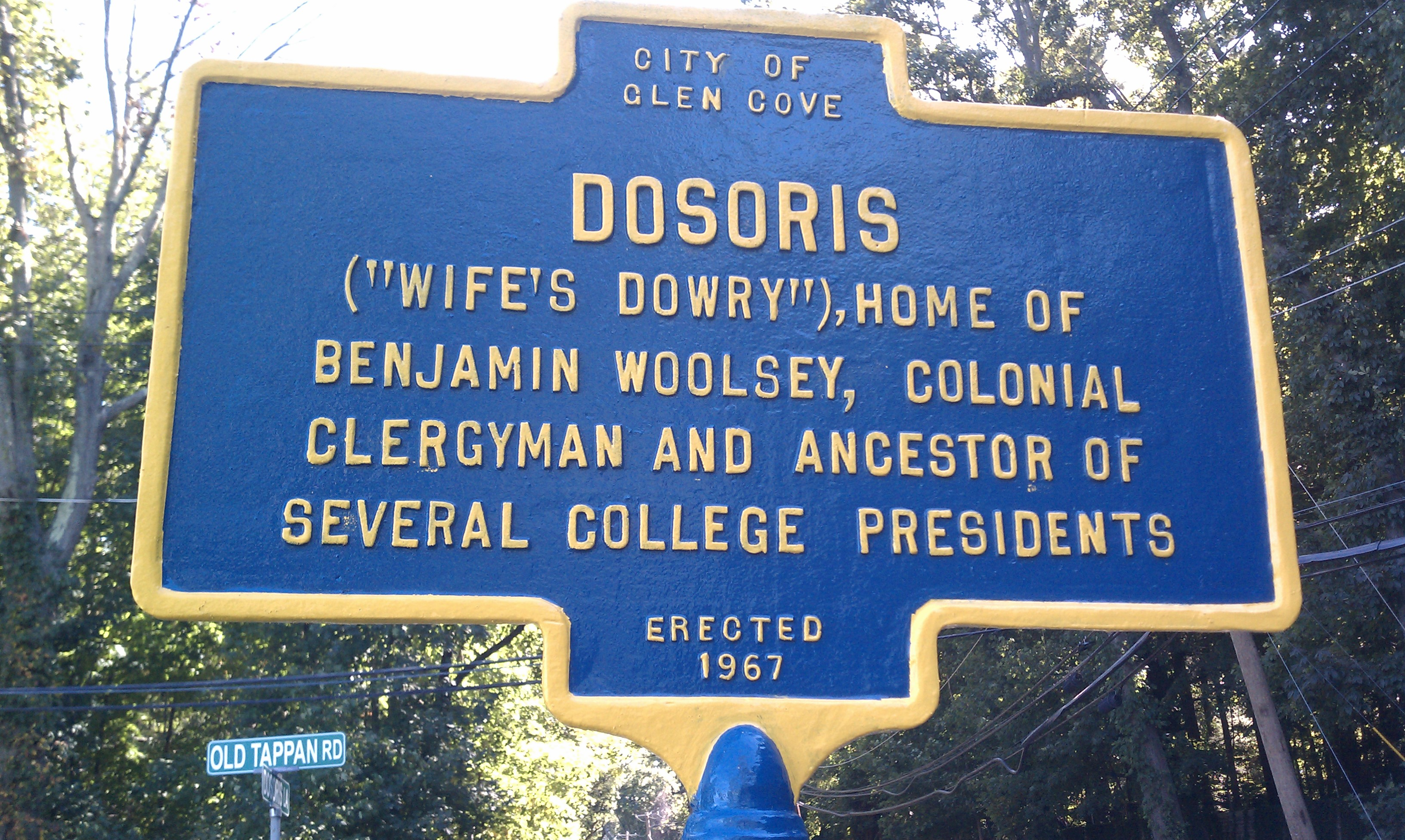
Glen Cove historical marker

Harkness died in 1919 and his wife died in 1947, wherein, the "Wings" house was rented out that summer to the Argentine Ambassador to the United States, Oscar Ivanissevich. But shortly afterwards the Dosoris estate was purchased by their one and only neighbor, Junius Spencer Morgan III, who in 1928 had snapped up Paul Dana's half of the island and built Salutation.

In 1974, Junius Spencer Morgan III sold the estate to John Stockwell Samuels, III, a Texas-born coal magnate, lawyer, and father to actor, John Stockwell. In 1993, the estate on 21.46 acres was for sale by the United States Bankruptcy Court for the Eastern District of New York for $5.7mil, and was purchased by Margo Walker, a real estate broker and socialite, for $9 million. According to William Cohan's book, The Last Tycoon, Michel David-Weill, Chairman of Lazard Frères, financed her purchase of West Island.

In 2017, the island was put up for sale for $125 million. The whole compound consists of the entire 48-acre island with six distinctive residences, the main one being "Salutation", a 10-acre adjacent strip with underwater rights, a 28-acre pond, a 250-foot dock and two helicopter spots, according to Bonnie Devendorf, listing agent at Daniel Gale Sotheby's International Realty.

=== Owners ===
- Peter Caverley (1721-?), purchased the island from Job and Dorothy Iarland
- Reverend Benjamin Woolsey, named the island "Dosoris"
- Charles A. Dana (1873-1919), editor and co-owner of the New York Sun
- Paul Dana (1905-1928), Charles Dana's son and member of Mrs. Astor's 400
- William Lamon Harkness (1907-1919), an heir to the Standard Oil fortune (owned half the island as island was sub-divided at this time)
- Junius Spencer Morgan III (and wife) (1928-1974), banker and member of the Morgan family
- John Stockwell Samuels III (1974-1993), Texas lawyer and coal magnate
- Margo Walker (1993–present), real estate broker and socialite (bought up the whole island)

== Buildings ==
The island's main structure is Salutation, also known as the "Manor House", a 27,000 sq. ft mansion built in 1919 (addition completed in 1929) by Roger Bullard for Junius Spencer Morgan III. There are five or six other major residences on the island, including the "Creek House;" the "Pond House"; the "Wing House"; and two shed cottages ("Dosoris Cottage" and "Little Sal Carriage House"). In addition to the five residences, there is an eight stall stable on the island.

In the summer of 1964, following the assassination of her husband, President John F. Kennedy, Jackie Kennedy resided on the island, renting the "Creek House".

== In popular culture ==
It is likely the inspiration for "West Egg" in The Great Gatsby. The Salutation was used to portray the Larrabee family mansion in the movie Sabrina (however this was not the location used in the original movie). Salutation was also seen in the movie A Perfect Murder; on the television show, Succession, in the season 2 episode, "Tern Haven", as the home of the Pierce family; on the NBC miniseries Deception, in 2013; and in 2018, it was used as the site of a "wealth retreat" in the HBO reboot of Gossip Girl.

== Lawsuit ==
In 1957, Robert J. Mcloughlin and Clarence Van Nostrand sued Junius Spencer Morgan III for ownership of the island, alleging his right to it via Adverse possession. Morgan won the lawsuit.
