= Weetamoe =

1930 yacht

- Class: J-class
- Sail no: 1
- Designer(s): Clinton Hoadley Crane
- Builder: Herreshoff yard
- Launched: May 10, 1930
- Owner(s): Junius Morgan syndicate
- Fate: scrapped in 1937

Racing career
- Skippers: George Nichols
- AC Defender Selection Series: 1930 America's Cup Defender Selections Series; 1934 America's Cup Defender Selections Series

Specifications
- Displacement: 143 long tons (145 metric tonnes)
- Length: 125 ft 9 ins (32.33 m) overall; 83 ft (25.3 m) at waterline
- Beam: 20 ft (6.1 m)
- Draft: 15 ft (4.57 m)
- Sail area: 7,560 sq.ft (702.3 m^{2})

Weetamoe was a 1930 yacht of the J Class built as a contender for the New York Yacht Club's defence of the 1930 America's Cup. She was ordered by a syndicate headed by Junius Morgan, designed by Clinton Hoadley Crane, and built by Herreshoff Manufacturing Company. Weetamoe was unsuccessful in her bid to become the Cup defender, an honor that went to Enterprise. She continued to sail for a few years afterwards, before being scrapped in 1937.

== Design and development ==
When the New York Yacht Club accepted Sir Thomas Lipton's challenge for the America's cup, they decided to form two syndicates to build one yacht each for the defense of the cup, and also to welcome other syndicates who might want to offer a defender. The two NYYC syndicates were to be led by Vice-Commodore Winthrop Aldrich and Rear-Commodore Junius Morgan.

Morgan's syndicate comprised:

- George T. Bowdoin
- Arthur Curtiss James
- Gerard Lambert
- J. P. Morgan
- Junius Morgan
- George Nichols
- Cornelius Vanderbilt
- Henry Walters

Her construction was of steel frames and deck beams, with wooden decks and a hull was built from very expensive Tobin bronze.

She was launched on May 10, 1930.

=== Support vessels ===
The syndicate also obtained several support craft for Weetamoe. These included:

- a steamer, Emblane
- two powerboats, Magistrate and Momo

=== Crew ===
Under the Racing Rules, yachts were allowed a total crew of 31, including any afterguard. The afterguard comprised:

- A. H. Eustis
- Robert N. Bavier
- Clinton Crane (designer)
- George Nichols (skipper)
- John Parkinson

The syndicate engaged J. Christiensen as their sailing master, and a professional crew of Scandinavian origin.

== The Long Island Sound series ==
On June 9, the contenders, together with the J-class yachts Resolute and Vanitie, met at Glen Cove for a series of races planned in Long Island Sound by the local clubs.

Of the series, Weetamoe won three out of four races, with the other going to Enterprise. Yankee arrived too late to compete in any but the fourth and last race.

== The Eastern Yacht Club races ==
The following week, the J-class boats traveled to Newport for three races organized by the Eastern Yacht Club.

Enterprise won all three of these races. Weetamoe recorded the fastest time in the first race, but withdrew after fouling Enterprise.

As winner of the races, Enterprise was awarded the Commodore Charles P. Curtiss cup, and a second prize was awarded to Yankee.

== Observation ==
During the first two weeks of July 1930, the America's Cup Committee staged a series of observation races to better understand the strengths and weaknesses of the four contenders to defend the cup. The races were conducted by starting the yachts in pairs, with the second pair starting fifteen minutes after the first. The yachts to race in each pair were determined by lot.

The end results of the observations were that Enterprise, Weetamoe, and Yankee all finished roughly the same, points-wise (14, 13, and 13 respectively), while Whirlwind had won only a single race and finished with only 8 points. Weetamoe won every race that she had finished.

Enterprise and Weetamoe each scored a technical victory over the other when their competitor could not finish a race. Likewise, Yankee scored a technical victory over Whirlwind.

== New York Yacht Club annual cruise ==
From August 2–9, the 1930 annual cruise of the New York Yacht Club offered a final opportunity for the contenders for the defense of the America's Cup to compete with each other prior to the selection trials. The cruise consisted of several port-to=-port legs, interspersed with races over set courses.

Enterprise and Weetamoe each won three races, and Yankee won one. As part of this cruise, Enterprise won the Astor Cup and Weetamoe won the City of Newport Cup.

== Trials ==
Formal trials between the four contenders commenced on August 20. The contenders were to race in pairs, the second division starting 15 minutes after the first division, as in the observation races.

Due to poor winds, only two trial races were held, both won by Enterprise against Weetamoe. Whirlwind was disabled in one of her races against Yankee.

On the evening of August 27, the America's Cup Committee informed the afterguard of Enterprise that their yacht had been selected to defend the cup.

== Fate ==
In 1934, Weetamoe was substantially modified, being given new hull contours and a bulb keel. These modifications were not successful and were eventually reversed.

Weetamoe was scrapped in 1937.

== Bibliography ==
- Garland, Joseph E. (1989). The Eastern Yacht Club: A History from 1870 to 1985. Marblehead, MA: The Eastern Yacht Club.
- "The Yachts: Enterprise". The National Iron & Steel Heritage Museum. Coatesville, PA: The National Iron & Steel Heritage Museum. n.d.
- Vanderbilt, Harold Stirling (1931). Enterprise: The Story of the Defense of the America's Cup in 1930. New York: Charles Scribner's Sons.
