= Sabrina (1995 film) =

1995 American romantic comedy by Sydney Pollack

- Theatrical release poster
- Directed by: Sydney Pollack
- Screenplay by: Barbara Benedek; David Rayfiel
- Based on: Sabrina by; Billy Wilder; Samuel Taylor; Ernest Lehman; Sabrina Fair by Samuel Taylor
- Produced by: Scott Rudin; Sydney Pollack
- Starring: Harrison Ford; Julia Ormond; Greg Kinnear; Nancy Marchand; John Wood
- Cinematography: Giuseppe Rotunno
- Edited by: Fredric Steinkamp
- Music by: John Williams
- Production companies: Mirage Enterprises; Sandollar Productions
- Distributed by: Paramount Pictures
- Release date: December 15, 1995 (United States)
- Running time: 127 minutes
- Country: United States
- Language: English
- Budget: $50–58 million
- Box office: $87.1 million

Sabrina is a 1995 American romantic comedy-drama film directed by Sydney Pollack from a screenplay by Barbara Benedek and David Rayfiel. It is a remake of Billy Wilder's 1954 film of the same name, which in turn was based upon the 1953 play Sabrina Fair, and follows a young woman, played by Julia Ormond, who becomes the center of an unexpected romantic rivalry between two very different brothers. Harrison Ford and Greg Kinnear co-starred as the Larrabee brothers, with Angie Dickinson, Richard Crenna, Nancy Marchand, Lauren Holly, John Wood, Dana Ivey and Fanny Ardant also appearing.

Filmed in New York, Massachusetts, and Paris, Sabrina was released by Paramount Pictures on December 15, 1995. It opened modestly and ultimately underperformed at the box office, earning about $53 million domestically and $87 million worldwide. Critically, it received mixed reviews, with praise for Ormond and the cast but frequent comparisons to the original and debate over its effectiveness as a remake. Despite the divided reception, it received two Academy Award nominations and three Golden Globe nominations, while also being criticized as a weaker or unnecessary remake.

== Plot ==
Sabrina Fairchild, the young daughter of the Larrabee family's chauffeur, has long harbored feelings for the charming David Larrabee, a carefree playboy who has never truly noticed her. After leaving for Paris to intern at Vogue Paris, she returns transformed into a poised and sophisticated woman.

David, at first failing to recognize Sabrina, soon becomes captivated by her despite his recent engagement to Elizabeth Tyson, the daughter of a powerful business magnate.

David's workaholic elder brother Linus fears that David's imminent wedding to the very suitable Elizabeth might be endangered. If the wedding were to be canceled, so would a lucrative merger with the bride's family business, Tyson Electronics, run by her father Patrick. This could cost the Larrabee Corporation, run by Linus and his mother Maude, over a billion dollars.

After David accidentally sits on champagne glasses in his back pocket, his subsequent injuries leave him hospitalized and on painkillers. Linus exploits the situation by redirecting Sabrina's affections onto himself in order to keep David's wedding on track.

Sabrina falls in love with Linus, even though she quotes others as calling him "the world's only living heart donor" as well as someone who "thinks that morals are paintings on walls and scruples are money in Russia." In the process, Linus falls in love with Sabrina, surprising even himself, as he is enamored by her open and free-spirited attitude in contrast to his constant fixation on work, like his father and grandfather before him. Unwilling to admit his feelings and acknowledging David as the one she fell in love with first, Linus confesses his scheme to Sabrina at the last minute and sends her back to Paris.

Before she gets on the plane to Paris, her father informs Sabrina that over the years of chauffeuring the father of David and Linus, the partition was always open in the car and he was able to listen to the senior Mr. Larrabee's business dealings.

When Mr. Larrabee bought stock, the chauffeur would buy too, and when Mr. Larrabee sold, the chauffeur would also sell. He then reveals that this has allowed him to amass personal wealth of over $2 million, though he continued to work as a chauffeur. He is now able to give Sabrina the life that he and her late mother dreamed of for her.

Meanwhile, Linus prepares to have David go to Paris to be with Sabrina. He is instead induced to follow her to Paris himself by his mother, his assistant, and an unexpectedly grown-up David, who announces that he is eloping with Elizabeth, securing the deal with Tyson, and taking over the Larrabee Corporation.

Linus arrives in Paris on the Concord, and reunites with Sabrina. He confesses his love for her, and they kiss.

== Cast ==
- Harrison Ford as Linus Larrabee
- Julia Ormond as Sabrina Fairchild
- Greg Kinnear as David Larrabee
- Nancy Marchand as Maude Larrabee
- John Wood as Thomas Fairchild
- Richard Crenna as Patrick Tyson
- Angie Dickinson as Ingrid Tyson
- Lauren Holly as Elizabeth Tyson
- Dana Ivey as Mack
- Míriam Colón as Rosa
- Elizabeth Franz as Joanna
- Fanny Ardant as Irene
- Valérie Lemercier as Martine
- Patrick Bruel as Louis
- Becky Ann Baker as Linda
- Paul Giamatti as Scott
- Margo Martindale as the nurse

== Production ==
=== Pre-production ===
In 1993, screenwriter Barbara Benedek submitted an original screenplay to producer Scott Rudin. Rudin soon noticed that her script bore an unintended resemblance to director Billy Wilder's 1954 film Sabrina and pointed out the similarities to Benedek. At his suggestion, she watched the original film, starring Humphrey Bogart, Audrey Hepburn, and William Holden, and ultimately decided to deconstruct it and reimagine it as a contemporary story. With approval from both Rudin and Paramount Pictures chairwoman Sherry Lansing, Benedek began reshaping Wilder’s film into a new version. Impressed with her draft, Rudin initially considered Mike Nichols to direct the project, with Harrison Ford, Robert Redford or Richard Gere envisioned for the male lead role of Linus Larrabee, as originated by Bogart. Nichols did not ultimately become involved. Rudin shared the script with Ford, with whom he had previously worked on the 1991 American drama film Regarding Henry, directed by Nichols. Ford was immediately drawn to the project, identifying a notable similarity between the character Linus and himself.

=== Casting ===
Harrison Ford was the first actor to join the project, doing so after a lengthy hiatus spent with his family following the completion of the action thriller Clear and Present Danger (1994). Motivated by a desire to move away from his action-oriented screen persona, he sought a "change of pace" and deliberately pursued a romantic role. A remake of the 1954 film Sabrina, combining romance and comedy, struck him as an especially suitable opportunity. Ford also played a key role in recruiting director Sydney Pollack, persuading him to take on the project approximately two weeks after Ford signed on. Initially hesitant about revisiting Wilder's 1954 original, Pollack nonetheless contacted Wilder prior to production out of professional respect. In a 2023 interview with James Hibberd of The Hollywood Reporter, Ford later reflected that, despite his amicable working relationship with Pollack, he ultimately felt miscast in the role of Linus. He attributed this discomfort to making Sabrina the most challenging shoot of his career, even surpassing the notoriously demanding production of Blade Runner (1982).

While undertaking extensive revisions of Barbara Benedek and David Rayfiel's original script, Pollack worked closely with casting director David Rubin to find an actress for the title role. A wide range of candidates was considered, including Julia Roberts, Julie Delpy, Meg Ryan, Demi Moore, and Robin Wright, among others. Winona Ryder declined the part, while Gwyneth Paltrow, fresh from securing a lead role in David Fincher's Seven (1995), auditioned. By September 1994, Pollack had narrowed the field from dozens of candidates to three finalists: French actress Juliette Binoche, English ballerina Darcey Bussell, and English actress Julia Ormond. He subsequently traveled to Europe to meet and screen-test each of them. Upon returning, he presented the test footage to Lansing at Paramount Pictures, where consensus ultimately favored Ormond. Ormond accepted the role without hesitation, later explaining that she had been deeply enthusiastic about the revised script.

For the role of David Larrabee, Pollack confirmed that Tom Cruise expressed interest, partly motivated by the prospect of working with Ford. However, his salary demands proved prohibitive. Although some reports suggested that Robert F. Kennedy, Jr. was under consideration, Pollack never met with him. The role ultimately went to Greg Kinnear, then best known as the host of the E! television show Talk Soup. Cast approximately three months after his initial meeting with Pollack, Kinnear made his debut in a leading film role with Sabrina. His temporary departure from the show to film in New York required complex negotiations between the production team, including producer Scott Rudin, and executives at NBC. Arrangements were ultimately made for Kinnear to pre-record several weeks of episodes to accommodate his filming schedule. Similarly, Pollack had to coordinate a workable timetable with Fanny Ardant, who was simultaneously performing in the theatre during the evenings while filming her scenes in Paris.

=== Filming ===
Originally scheduled to start filming in September 1994, Sabrina was primarily shot in early-to-mid 1995, with principal photography taking place from January 30 to June 21. The start of production was delayed, due to the still-unresolved casting process, particularly regarding the title role. The film was based at Kaufman Astoria Studios in Queens, New York City, while exterior scenes were shot on location in New York, Massachusetts, and Paris, the latter serving as the setting for Sabrina's time abroad. Production was further hampered by unseasonable weather, which caused additional delays, necessitated a return trip to Paris for additional photography, and ultimately led to postponements of the film's release to December 1995.

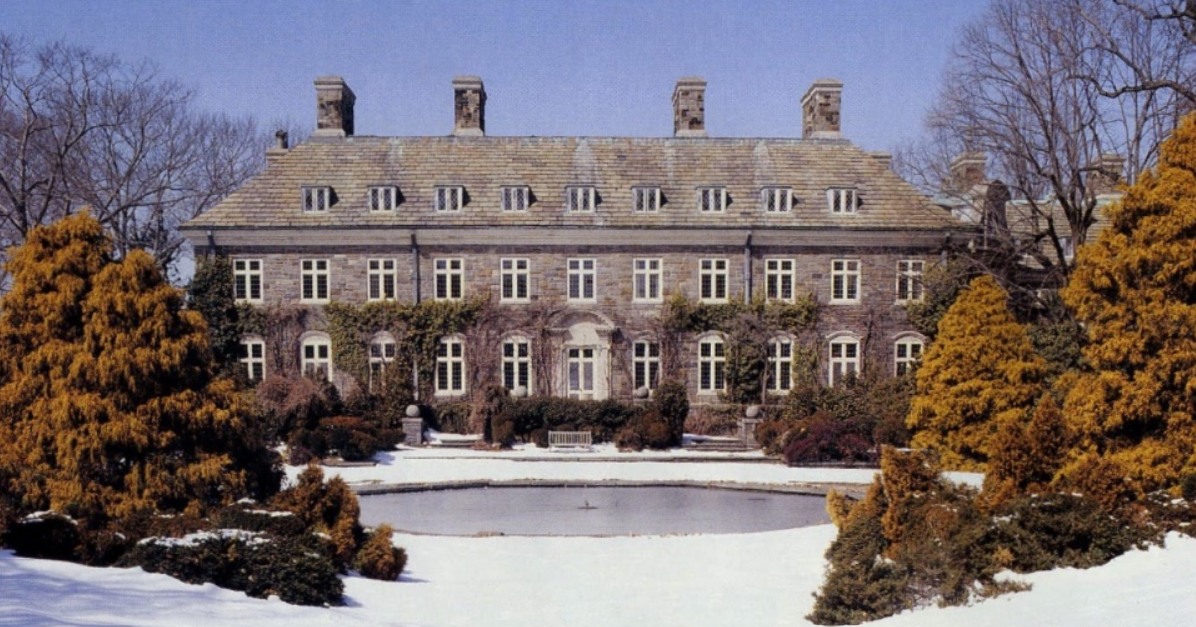
The Salutation estate in Glen Cove, Dosoris Island was extensively used as a filming location for Sabrina.

In contrast to Wilder's 1954 original, which relied largely on Hollywood sound stages, Pollack opted for greater use of authentic locations. This approach was particularly evident in the Paris sequences, which were filmed on location throughout the city, whereas the earlier film had primarily used studio sets supplemented by limited stock footage. Paris locations included the Trocadéro, Pont Alexandre III, Pont Marie, Parc Monceau, Place de la Concorde, Rue des Beaux-Arts, Sacré-Cœur, and Montmartre. Sabrina's final scene, depicting the reunited lovers, was filmed on the Pont des Arts.

A similar emphasis on realism shaped the depiction of the Larrabee estate. While the 1954 film substituted a Beverly Hills mansion for Long Island, the remake used the Salutation estate, a 45-room Colonial Revival mansion in Glen Cove on Dosoris Island, as the Larrabee family residence. Built around 1929 for Junius Spencer Morgan III, son of J. P. Morgan Jr., the property remained a private residence at the time of filming. The production made extensive use of both its exterior and interior spaces. Additional filming locations included Martha's Vineyard, where a summertime residence of singer Billy Joel, located in Menemsha, Chilmark, served as the Larrabee's cottage, as well as Glen Cove station and the greenhouse at the Planting Fields Arboretum State Historic Park in Oyster Bay. The Larrabee corporate office exteriorss, where several key scenes take place, were filmed at 399 Park Avenue, at Park Avenue and East 54th Street.

=== Music ===
For Sabrina, Pollack sought a musical approach that combined a classically styled romantic score with selections evocative of the Great American Songbook, particularly for the film's formal social gatherings. The score was composed and conducted by John Williams, whose restrained and lyrical style complemented the film's refined romantic tone, and performed by the Hollywood Studio Symphony. Two original songs played in the film, "Moonlight" and "How Can I Remember?," were written with lyrics by Alan and Marilyn Bergman and composed prior to filming to allow for their inclusion in on-screen performances. Vocal versions of both songs were performed by Sting and lounge singer Michael Dees. "Moonlight" received Academy Award, Golden Globe and Grammy Award nominations, while the score earned Williams another nominations in the Best Original Score category at the 68th Academy Awards.

== Reception ==
=== Box office ===
Sabrina made $5.6 million during its opening weekend, ranking in fifth place behind Jumanji, Toy Story, Heat and Father of the Bride Part II. The film was a box office disappointment, with a result of US$53 million domestically, and total of $87 million worldwide.

=== Critical reception ===
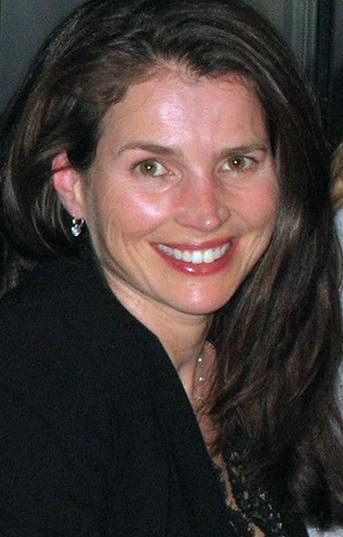
Julia Ormond received positive reviews, though critics were divided over whether her casting matched the legacy of Audrey Hepburn.

The film suffered from comparisons to the original version. On Rotten Tomatoes, the film has an approval rating of 60% based on reviews from 55 critics. The site's critics consensus states: "Sydney Pollack's Sabrina doesn't do anything the original didn't do better, but assured direction and a cast of seasoned stars make this a pleasant enough diversion." On Metacritic, the film has a score of 56% based on reviews from 27 critics, indicating "mixed or average" reviews. Audiences surveyed by CinemaScore gave the film a grade "A−" on scale of A+ to F.

Entertainment Weekly's Owen Gleiberman described Sabrina as a "top-heavy soufflé" of a romantic comedy, but found it largely effective as a modernized fairy tale, praising Julia Ormond's evocation of Audrey Hepburn's "aristocratic delicacy," Greg Kinnear's "endearing innocence," and Harrison Ford's "quiet melancholy," even as he questioned whether the Linus character still fully made sense. Roger Ebert of The Chicago Sun-Times was similarly receptive, arguing that the film works because it fully embraces its status as a fairy tale, where "Ormond is exquisitely regardable" and the story depends on casting rather than realism, making it "escapism about escapism" that remains "just as satisfying" as the original in its own terms. Edward Guthmann of The San Francisco Chronicle called the film a "glossy remake" still under the "ghost of Hepburn," but ultimately a "warm and clever romantic comedy" that "stands on its own," praising Ormond's "class and intelligence" while highlighting Kinnear and Nancy Marchand as standout performers, even as he noted a weaker focus when the narrative shifts toward Ford. Characterizing it as "the guilty pleasure of this holiday movie season" and a "kamikaze remake" of Wilder's 1954 classic, New York Times critic Janet Maslin found that Pollack's Sabrina was "intelligently faithful to the original without slavishness." She argued that the film pushes past the original's "snobbish and dated story" and judged it a "breezy, lighthearted throwback" that works in "radiant color" with a "newly sharpened sense of humor," though she acknowledged Ormond could not replicate Hepburn's iconic presence.

By contrast, Los Angeles Times critic Kenneth Turan argued the film "plays like a standard brand," more "product" than passion, "undemanding and unobjectionable" but ultimately "too flimsy of a reed to be successfully replanted," citing weak romantic dynamics and miscasting. Variety's Todd McCarthy was harsher still, calling it "more fizzle than fizz," criticizing its shift toward Linus’s "midlife crisis" and finding Ormond "flat, listless and lacking any particular character," concluding that despite polished production values it was "less than scintillating." Peter Travers of Rolling Stone dismissed the film as a "dud remake," arguing that Ormond lacks "movie-star glamour," Ford is "at his most dour," and the result is a "lushly decorative" version that is "just what we don’t need." Desson Howe of The Washington Post concluded that the film "never evokes the sweet allure of Billy Wilder's original film," while his colleague, Rita Kempley, found that Sabrina was "swallow of flat champagne" compared with Wilder's version, arguing that while the original "sparkled and fizzed" with Hepburn's charm, the remake was reliying on Ormond’s "toothsomeness," "poky pacing," and "uninspired scribblings." She criticized Ford as stiff and emotionally inert, while noting that Kinnear and supporting players like Marchand provide some of the film's only vitality, concluding that this version opts for love, but "just not the intoxicating kind."

=== Accolades ===
Award	Category	Recipient(s)	Result
Academy Awards	Best Original Musical or Comedy Score	John Williams	Nominated
Academy Awards	Best Original Song	"Moonlight"; Music by John Williams; Lyrics by Alan and Marilyn Bergman	Nominated
Chicago Film Critics Association Awards	Most Promising Actor	Greg Kinnear	Won
Golden Globe Awards	Best Motion Picture – Musical or Comedy		Nominated
Golden Globe Awards	Best Actor in a Motion Picture – Musical or Comedy	Harrison Ford	Nominated
Golden Globe Awards	Best Original Song – Motion Picture	"Moonlight"; Music by John Williams; Lyrics by Alan and Marilyn Bergman	Nominated
Grammy Awards	Best Song Written Specifically for a Motion Picture or for Television	"Moonlight"; Music by John Williams; Lyrics by Alan and Marilyn Bergman	Nominated
YoGa Awards	Worst Remake	Sydney Pollack	Won (Note: Tied with Diabolique)
