= The Big Chill (film) =

1983 film by Lawrence Kasdan

- Theatrical release poster
- Directed by: Lawrence Kasdan
- Written by: Lawrence Kasdan; Barbara Benedek
- Produced by: Michael Shamberg
- Starring: Tom Berenger; Glenn Close; Jeff Goldblum; William Hurt; Kevin Kline; Mary Kay Place; Meg Tilly; JoBeth Williams; Don Galloway
- Cinematography: John Bailey
- Edited by: Carol Littleton
- Production company: Carson Productions
- Distributed by: Columbia Pictures
- Release date: September 28, 1983
- Running time: 105 minutes
- Country: United States
- Language: English
- Budget: $8 million
- Box office: $56.4 million

The Big Chill is a 1983 American comedy-drama film directed by Lawrence Kasdan, starring an ensemble cast consisting of Tom Berenger, Glenn Close, Jeff Goldblum, William Hurt, Kevin Kline, Mary Kay Place, Meg Tilly, and JoBeth Williams. The plot focuses on a group of baby boomers who attended the University of Michigan, reuniting after 12 years when their friend Alex commits suicide. It was filmed in Beaufort, South Carolina.

The film was released by Columbia Pictures on September 28, 1983, was a box office hit by grossing $56.4 million against an $8 million budget and earned mixed to positive reviews, and was the first leading roles for many of the cast who went on to success in other films. The film received numerous honors, including three Academy Award nominations: Best Picture (Michael Shamberg, producer), Best Original Screenplay (Lawrence Kasdan and Barbara Benedek), and Best Supporting Actress (Glenn Close). Additionally, it would also go on to win the People's Choice Award at the 8th Toronto International Film Festival.

The soundtrack features soul, R&B, and pop-rock music from the 1960s and 1970s, including tracks by Creedence Clearwater Revival, Aretha Franklin, Marvin Gaye, The Temptations, the Rolling Stones, and Three Dog Night.

The Big Chill was later adapted for television as the short-lived series Hometown. Later, it influenced the television series Thirtysomething and A Million Little Things.

In 2025, it was selected for preservation in the United States National Film Registry by the Library of Congress as being "culturally, historically or aesthetically significant."

== Plot ==
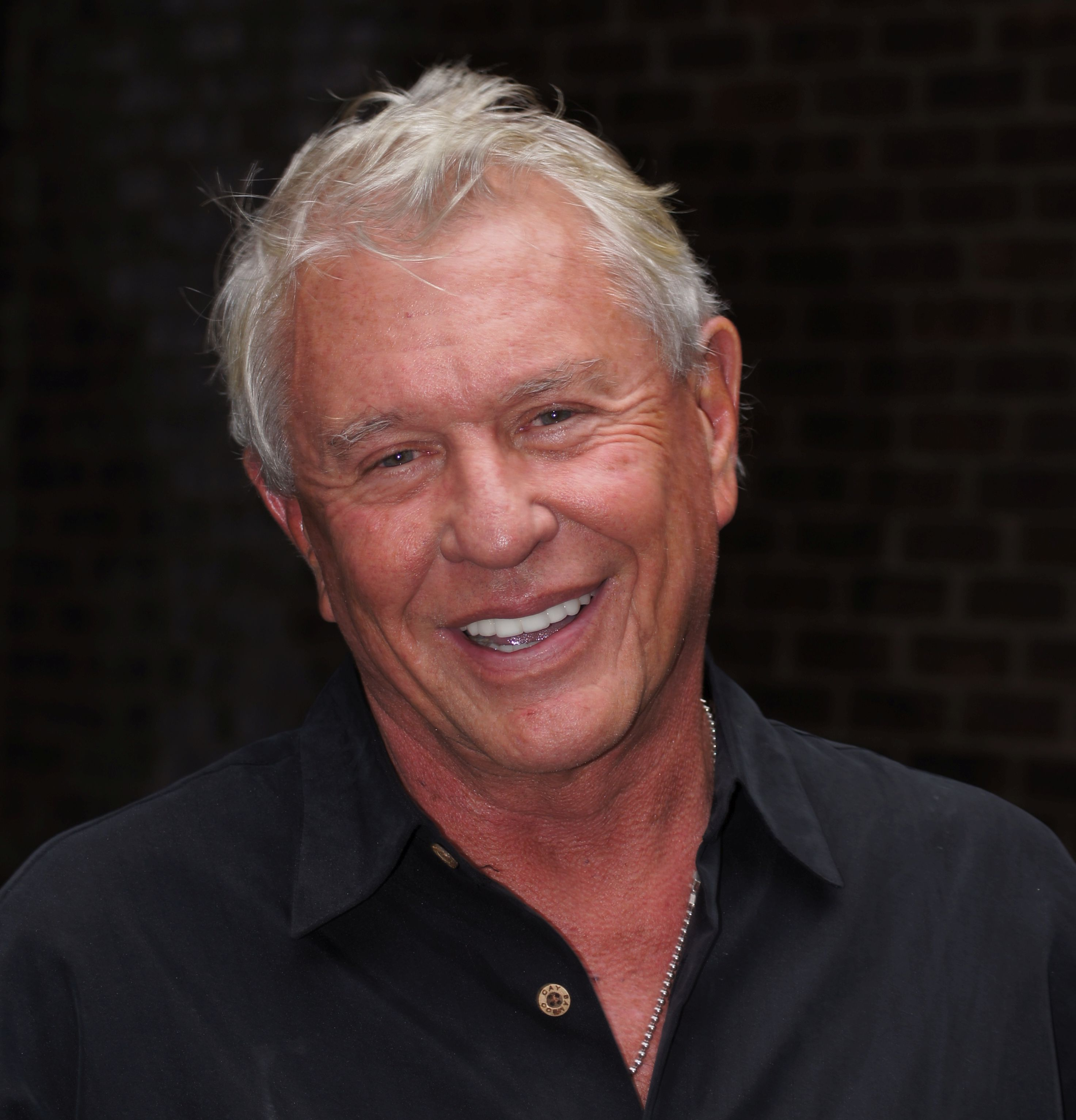
Tom Berenger plays Sam Weber

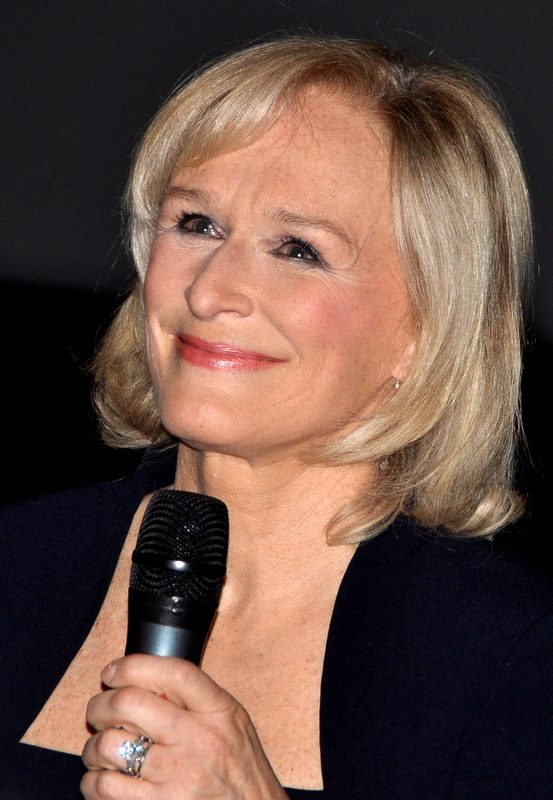
Glenn Close plays Sarah Cooper

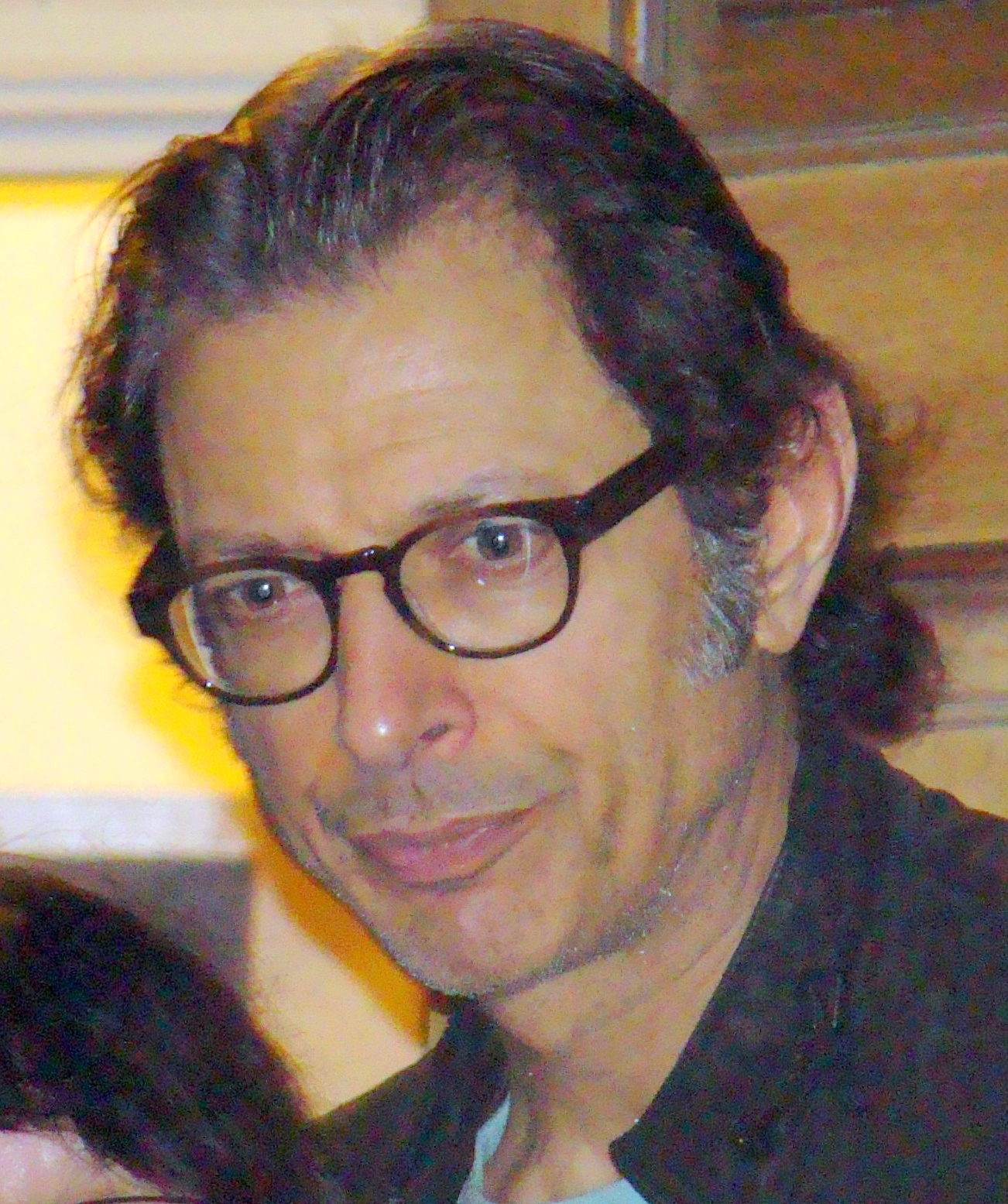
Jeff Goldblum plays Michael Gold

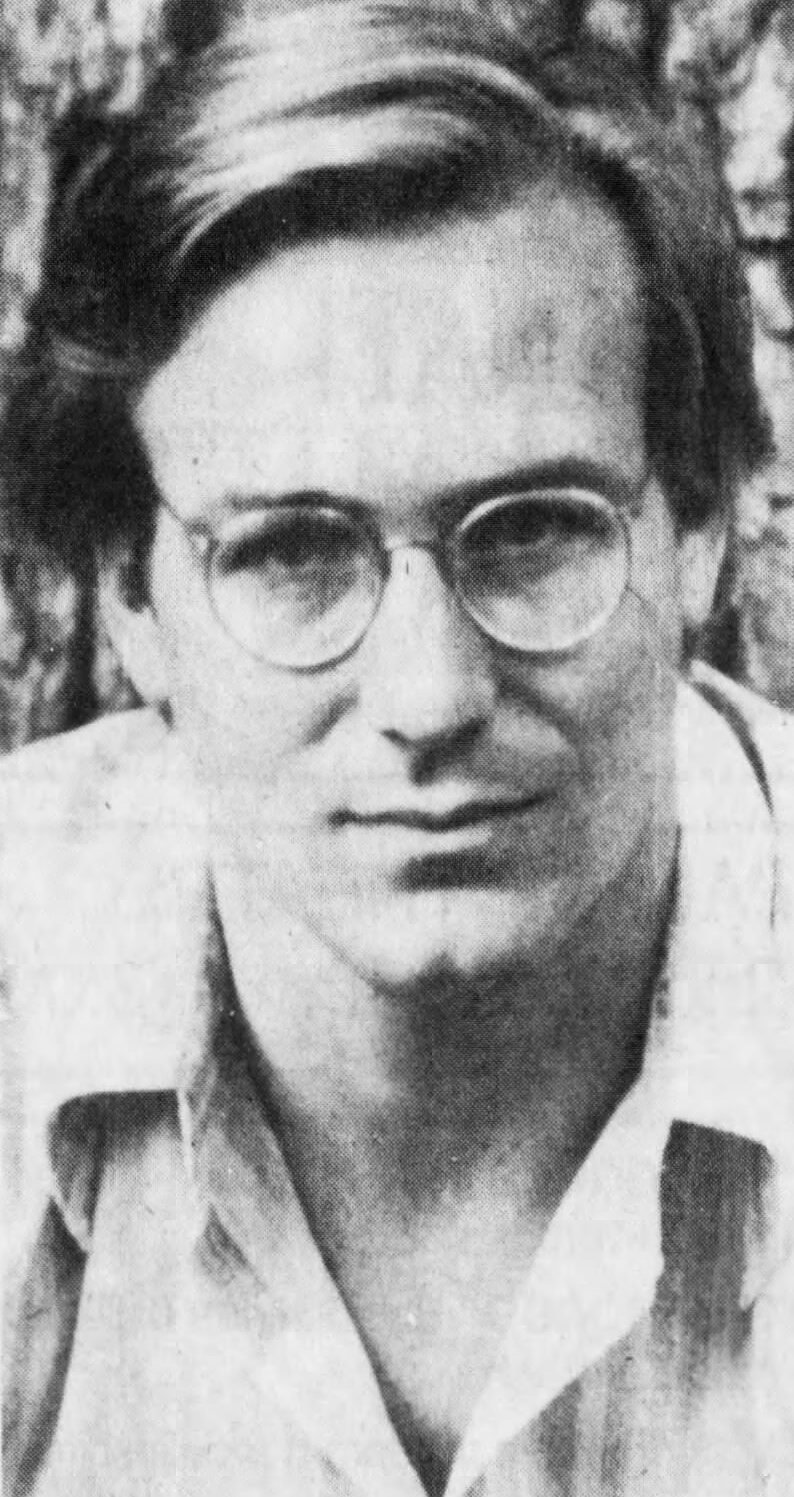
William Hurt plays Nick Carlton

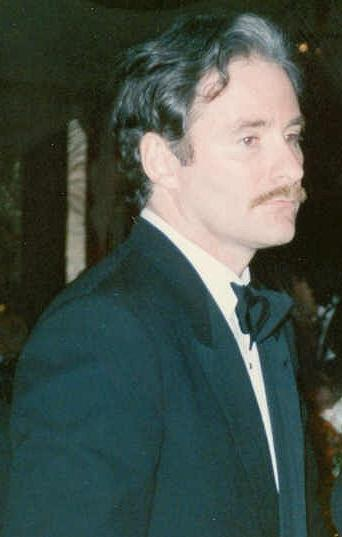
Kevin Kline plays Harold Cooper

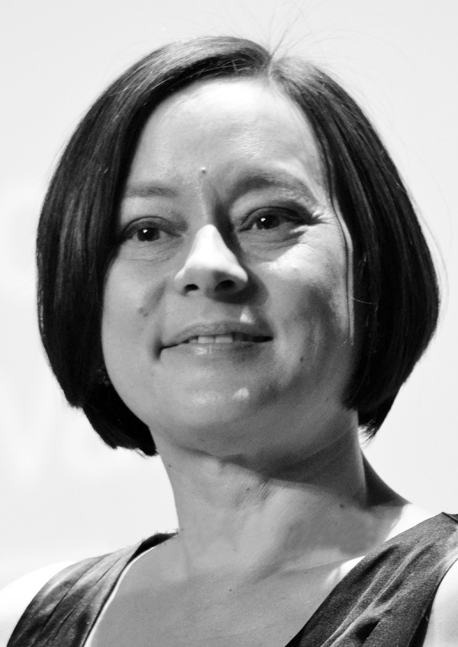
Meg Tilly plays Chloe

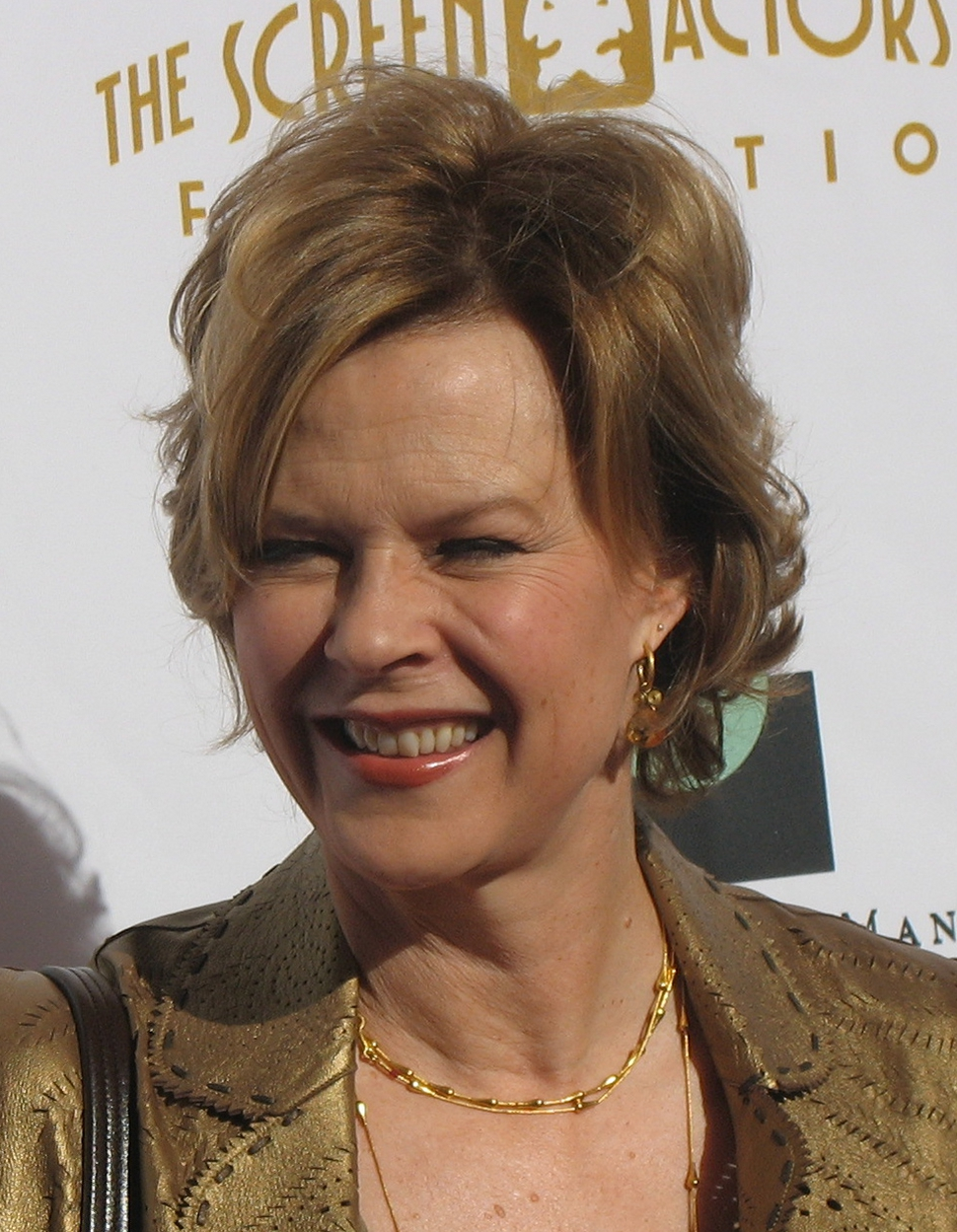
JoBeth Williams plays Karen Bowens

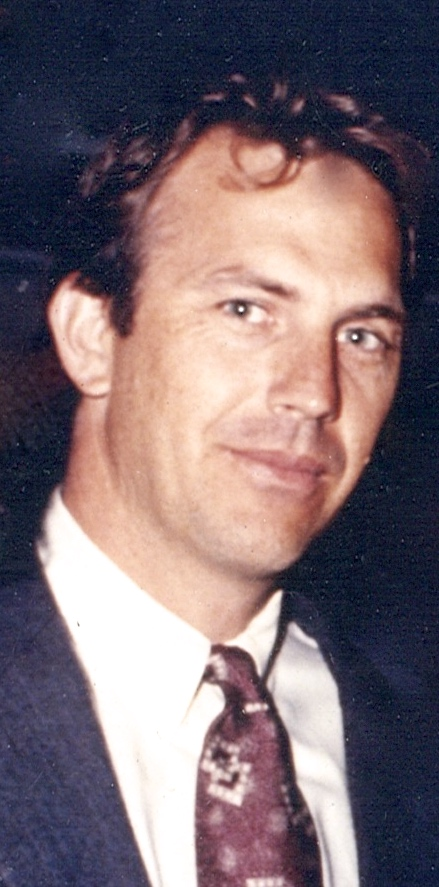
Kevin Costner plays Alex Marshall (scenes cut)

After Alex Marshall's suicide, his fellow University of Michigan alumni and close friends attend his funeral at the Tidalholm plantation in Beaufort, South Carolina. During the visit, everyone stays with Sarah and Harold Cooper.

His other friends include Sam Weber, a television actor; Meg Jones, once a public defender and now a real-estate attorney; Michael Gold, a journalist for People magazine; former talk-radio psychologist Nick Carlton, now an impotent Vietnam vet with a drug addiction; and Karen Bowen, an unfulfilled writer unhappily married to Richard, a conservative advertising executive. Also present is Chloe, Alex's girlfriend of four months who is much younger than Alex and had been living with him in Sarah and Harold's basement.

While out jogging early the next morning, Harold, violating SEC rules, tells Nick that a large corporation is about to buy his small company, which will make him rich and triple the value of the stock. He told Alex, making it possible for him to buy property in the area.

Harold suggests Nick use the tip to get into a new line of work. During their conversation, it is revealed that Sarah and Alex had a brief affair five years earlier, which all the friends knew about. Nick comforts Harold by reminding him she did not marry Alex. Harold, Sarah, and Alex moved past it, but Sarah tells Karen her friendship with Alex was harmed by the affair.

Richard goes home the next day, but Karen stays. Harold, Nick, Michael, and Chloe drive out to see the old house that Chloe and Alex were renovating. Meanwhile, Meg tells Sarah she is fed up with failed relationships and intends to have a child on her own. Believing she is ovulating, she plans to ask Sam to be the father of her child. She approaches Nick first, only to discover she's the last to know about his impotency.

Michael, who continually flirts with Chloe, needs investors for a New York nightclub. At dinner, Sarah becomes tearful and wonders if their fervent '60s idealism was "just fashion". Later that night, Meg approaches Sam, but he declines, feeling fatherhood is too great a responsibility as he already has an estranged child. Nick shares his drugs, with varying effects.

The next day, Harold, a running shoe entrepreneur, gives everyone a pair. Nick goes to the old house and sits on the porch for hours, missing the Michigan football game. Michael offers to sire Meg's child, alluding to their one-time college encounter.

During a halftime game of touch football, a local police officer escorts a sullen Nick back to the house after he runs a red light and becomes belligerent. Recognizing Sam, the officer offers to drop charges if he will hop into Nick's Porsche 911 the way his J. T. Lancer character does on TV. He tries but fails, injuring himself slightly. Nick angers Harold by accusing him of being friendly with cops. Harold chastises Nick, reminding him that this is his home and Nick's recklessness could put his reputation in danger.

Karen tells a surprised Sam that she is in love with him and wants to leave Richard. He tells her his first marriage failed because of boredom and he does not want her to make the same mistake. Feeling led on, Karen angrily stomps off.

Meg tells Sarah that Michael is the wrong choice. Sarah observes the warm phone conversation between her young daughter and Meg. Later, the group, confused over Alex's death, regrets losing touch with him. To everyone but Sam, it seems that Alex withdrew deliberately. Nick is particularly cynical and bitter about life, love, and friendship.

Karen follows Sam outside to mollify him, and they have sex. Sarah pulls Harold aside, embracing him, telling him she has a favor to ask: "It's about Meg..." Meg goes to him and they make love, tenderly. Chloe asks Nick to spend the night in the room she shared with Alex.

The next morning, Harold announces that Nick and Chloe will stay on to renovate the old house. Karen packs to return home to Richard. Michael ditches his nightclub plans. Nick shows everyone an old column that Michael wrote about Alex declining a prestigious fellowship. As the friends prepare to depart, Michael jokingly tells the Coopers they have taken a secret vote: They are never leaving.

== Cast ==
- Tom Berenger as Sam Weber, a television actor who Meg asks to father her child, but feels fatherhood is too great a responsibility as he already has an estranged child.
- Glenn Close as Sarah Cooper, who had a brief affair with Alex five years earlier, primarily out of compassion; Sarah now helps friend Meg's goal to single motherhood by facilitating her impregnation by Harold.
- Jeff Goldblum as Michael Gold, a People journalist seeking investors for a New York nightclub. During the college years Michael had a brief encounter with Meg that led to an abortion.
- William Hurt as Nick Carlton, a former talk-radio psychologist, now an impotent Vietnam vet and drug dealer. Nick and Karen dated steadily during their college years, but Karen remains aloof, busy flirting with Sam.
- Kevin Kline as Harold Cooper, Sarah's husband and owner of a small running shoe company being purchased by a large corporation, who hosts the friends after the funeral. Harold tries to help Nick find a new line of work, as he tried to help Alex.
- Mary Kay Place as Meg Jones, a real estate attorney, and former public defender. Feeling her biological clock ticking away, she is determined to become a single mother.
- Meg Tilly as Chloe, Alex's much younger girlfriend of four months who lived with him in Sarah and Harold's basement.
- JoBeth Williams as Karen Bowens, an unfulfilled writer unhappily married to Richard, a conservative advertising executive. She harbors long-smoldering feelings for Sam that he encourages noncommittally.
- Don Galloway as Richard Bowens, Karen's conservative advertising executive husband.

Also, Kevin Costner was cast as Alex Marshall, whose fellow University of Michigan alumni and close friends attend his funeral after his suicide, but his scenes were cut.

== Production ==
According to a Newsday article, Lawrence Kasdan and Barbara Benedek began writing The Big Chill in September 1980, five months after the release of Return of the Secaucus 7 They wrote the screenplay as a semi-autobiographical story inspired by their optimistic political activism while attending college in the 1960s and then their disillusionment with society in the 1970s. While attending the University of Michigan, Kasdan lived at the Eugene V. Debs Cooperative House in the late 1960s, and his experiences at the co-op informed the direction of the screenplay. Many of the characters were based on his housemates, and the ways in which they cook communal meals and share their house echo the culture of Ann Arbor cooperatives. Kasdan and Benedek worked on the screenplay as Kasdan was directing Body Heat. While the other characters in the film weren't written with any specific actors in mind, Kasdan wrote the role of "Nick" for Body Heat's star, William Hurt, who gave Kasdan a commitment to do The Big Chill.

Kasdan first pitched the story to The Ladd Company but was rejected. Richard Fischoff unsuccessfully tried to convince Paramount Pictures to film the screenplay after reading it in the summer of 1982. When this failed he turned the screenplay to Marcia Nasatir, who had recently departed her executive positions at United Artists and Orion Pictures to cofound Carson Productions with Johnny Carson. Fischoff convinced Nasatir to finance the film as the studio's first production, and took over as supervising producer after she left the studio to work at 20th Century Fox.

Production on the film began on November 8, 1982, in Atlanta. Filming primarily took place at the Edgar Fripp House (called "Tidalholm") in downtown Beaufort, South Carolina, where the film was set.

Kasdan's wife Meg was placed in charge of compiling period-appropriate songs for the soundtrack. She heard "I Heard It Through the Grapevine" for the first time in many years while picking her son up at camp, listening to a Marvin Gaye cassette, and was struck by how the song with no dialogue would make a perfect start to the film.

It was decided before filming that "Ain't Too Proud to Beg" by The Temptations would be used for the cleanup after dinner scene, so the cast were given headphones so that they could hear the song during filming, making it easier for them to keep the beat.

JoBeth Williams recalled filming a scene flashing back to the characters in 1968. "It was just wonderful to shoot", she said. "They rented this big house in Atlanta and installed beaded curtains, rock posters, incense, 1968 Life magazines—it was a real time warp." Williams says that, in the scene, her character was living with William Hurt's character and ignoring Tom Berenger's. The Alex character, played by Kevin Costner "looking like a scruffy James Dean", was also in the scene. "That turned out to be the problem... Nobody could live up to that role after the build-up through the film, and audiences said they didn't want to see anybody try. So the last 10 minutes of the film were just cut out." Filming concluded on February 7, 1983.

Consequently, Costner only appears as the body of Alex in the coffin during the opening title sequence. According to Kasdan, it was his decision to axe the scenes which were to appear at the end of the film as a flashback. "It didn't work," he said in an interview with the Toronto Star. "I felt so bad about it." Costner was given a role in Kasdan's next film, the 1985 western Silverado, as Jake, the younger brother of Emmett, played by Scott Glenn, alongside fellow Big Chill cast member Kevin Kline, who played Paden.

== Reception ==
=== Critical response ===
On Rotten Tomatoes, the film has an approval rating of 70% based on reviews from 43 critics. The site's critical consensus reads "The Big Chill captures a generation's growing ennui with a terrific cast, a handful of perceptive insights, and one of the decade's best film soundtracks." On Metacritic, the film has a weighted average score of 61 out of 100 based on reviews from 12 critics, indicating "generally favorable reviews".

At the time, Richard Corliss of Time described The Big Chill as a "funny and ferociously smart movie", stating:

These Americans are in their 30s today, but back then they were the Now Generation. Right Now: give me peace, give me justice, gimme good lovin'. For them, in the voluptuous bloom of youth, the '60s was a banner you could carry aloft or wrap yourself inside. A verdant anarchy of politics, sex, drugs, and style carpeted the landscape. And each impulse was scored to the rollick of the new music: folk, rock, pop, R&B. The armies of the night marched to Washington, but they boogied to Liverpool and Motown. Now, in 1983, Harold & Sarah & Sam & Karen & Michael & Meg & Nick—classmates all from the University of Michigan at the end of our last interesting decade—have come to the funeral of a friend who has slashed his wrists. Alex was a charismatic prodigy of science and friendship and progressive hell raising who opted out of academe to try social work, then manual labor, then suicide. He is presented as a victim of terminal decompression from the orbital flight of his college years: a worst-case scenario his friends must ponder, probing themselves for symptoms of the disease.

Vincent Canby of The New York Times wrote that the film was a "very accomplished, serious comedy" and an "unusually good choice to open this year's [New York Film Festival] in that it represents the best of mainstream American film making."

Roger Ebert of the Chicago Sun-Times gave the film two and a half stars out of four, observing "The Big Chill is a splendid technical exercise. It has all the right moves. It knows all the right words. Its characters have all the right clothes, expressions, fears, lusts, and ambitions. But there's no payoff and it doesn't lead anywhere. I thought at first that was a weakness of the movie. There also is the possibility that it's the movie's message."

The film was parodied by T. C. Boyle in his short story The Little Chill. The story begins "Hal had known Rob and Irene, Jill, Harvey, Tottle, and Pesky since elementary school, and they were all 40 going on 60."

== Accolades ==
Award	Category	Nominee(s)	Result	Ref.
Academy Awards	Best Picture	Michael Shamberg	Nominated	
Academy Awards	Best Supporting Actress	Glenn Close	Nominated	
Academy Awards	Best Screenplay – Written Directly for the Screen	Lawrence Kasdan and Barbara Benedek	Nominated	
British Academy Film Awards	Best Original Screenplay	Lawrence Kasdan and Barbara Benedek	Nominated	
Directors Guild of America Awards	Outstanding Directorial Achievement in Motion Pictures	Lawrence Kasdan	Nominated	
Golden Globe Awards	Best Motion Picture – Musical or Comedy		Nominated	
Golden Globe Awards	Best Screenplay – Motion Picture	Lawrence Kasdan and Barbara Benedek	Nominated	
Los Angeles Film Critics Association Awards	Best Screenplay	Lawrence Kasdan and Barbara Benedek	Runner-up	
National Board of Review Awards	Top Ten Films		8th Place	
National Film Preservation Board	National Film Registry		Honored	
Toronto International Film Festival	People's Choice Award	Lawrence Kasdan	Won	
Writers Guild of America Awards	Best Comedy – Written Directly for the Screen	Lawrence Kasdan and Barbara Benedek	Won	

In 2004, "Ain't Too Proud to Beg" finished #94 in AFI's 100 Years...100 Songs poll.

== Soundtracks ==
Ten of the songs from the film were released on the soundtrack album; four additional songs not from the film were added to the original CD release as "additional classics from the era". The rest of the film's songs (aside from the Rolling Stones' "You Can't Always Get What You Want"), as well as the "additional classics" from the original soundtrack CD were released in 1984 on a second soundtrack album, titled More Songs from the Big Chill. Both albums were re-mastered in 1998; the track list of the first album mirrored the original LP, without the "additional classics". In 2004, Hip-O Records released a Deluxe edition, containing 16 of the 18 songs from the film (again excluding "You Can't Always Get What You Want" and newly omitting "Quicksilver Girl" by the Steve Miller Band) and three additional film instrumentals. A second "music of a generation" disc of 19 additional tracks was included as well. Some of those tracks had appeared on the More Songs release.

=== Original Motion Picture Soundtrack ===
The Big Chill

Soundtrack album from the film The Big Chill by Various Artists
- Released: September 1983
- Recorded: 1962–1971
- Genre: R&B/Soul
- Length: 43:38
- Label: Motown Records

Professional ratings
Review scores
Source	Rating
Allmusic	link

No.	Title	Writer(s)	Artist	Length
1.	"I Heard It Through the Grapevine" (extended version)	Norman Whitfield, Barrett Strong	Marvin Gaye (1968)	5:03
2.	"My Girl"	Smokey Robinson, Ronald White	The Temptations (1965)	2:55
3.	"Good Lovin'"	Rudy Clark, Arthur Resnick	The Young Rascals (1966)	2:28
4.	"The Tracks of My Tears"	Robinson, Warren Moore, Marvin Tarplin	The Miracles (1965)	2:53
5.	"Joy to the World"	Hoyt Axton	Three Dog Night (1970)	3:24
6.	"Ain't Too Proud to Beg"	Whitfield, Edward Holland, Jr.	The Temptations (1966)	2:31
7.	"(You Make Me Feel Like) A Natural Woman"	Gerry Goffin, Carole King, Jerry Wexler	Aretha Franklin (1968)	2:41
8.	"I Second That Emotion"	Robinson, Al Cleveland	Smokey Robinson and The Miracles (1967)	2:46
9.	"A Whiter Shade of Pale"	Keith Reid, Gary Brooker, Matthew Fisher	Procol Harum (1967)	4:03
10.	"Tell Him"	Bert Berns	The Exciters (1962)	2:29

"Additional Classics From The Era" on original CD release
No.	Title	Writer(s)	Artist	Length
11.	"It's the Same Old Song"	E. Holland, Lamont Dozier, Brian Holland	The Four Tops (1965)	2:45
12.	"Dancing in the Street"	Marvin Gaye, William "Mickey" Stevenson	Martha and The Vandellas (1964)	2:38
13.	"What's Going On"	Gaye, Cleveland, Renaldo "Obie" Benson	Marvin Gaye (1971)	3:52
14.	"Too Many Fish in the Sea"	Whitfield, E. Holland	The Marvelettes (1964)	2:26

==== Charts ====
Chart (1983/84)	Peak position
Australia (Kent Music Report)	5
United States (Billboard 200)	17
Chart (1988)	Peak position
Australian Albums (ARIA)	34

==== Certifications ====
Organization	Level	Date
RIAA – USA	Gold	December 12, 1983
RIAA – USA	Platinum	March 29, 1984
RIAA – USA	Double Platinum	September 27, 1985
RIAA – USA	4× Platinum	July 20, 1998
RIAA – USA	6× Platinum	October 15, 1998

=== More Songs from the Big Chill ===
More songs from the original soundtrack
No.	Title	Writer(s)	Artist	Length
1.	"Bad Moon Rising"	John Fogerty	Creedence Clearwater Revival	2:19
2.	"Wouldn't It Be Nice"	Brian Wilson, Tony Asher	The Beach Boys	2:21
3.	"It's the Same Old Song"	Edward Holland, Jr, Lamont Dozier, Brian Holland	The Four Tops*	2:44
4.	"When a Man Loves a Woman"	Andrew Wright, Calvin Lewis	Percy Sledge	2:55
5.	"Dancing in the Street"	Marvin Gaye, William "Mickey" Stevenson, Ivy Jo Hunter	Martha Reeves & the Vandellas*	2:37
6.	"What's Going On"	Marvin Gaye, Al Cleveland, Renaldo Benson	Marvin Gaye*	3:51
7.	"In the Midnight Hour"	Wilson Pickett, Steve Cropper	The Rascals	3:59
8.	"Quicksilver Girl"	Steve Miller	The Steve Miller Band	2:42
9.	"Gimme Some Lovin'"	Steve Winwood, Muff Winwood, Spencer Davis	The Spencer Davis Group	2:55
10.	"Too Many Fish in the Sea"	Norman Whitfield, Edward Holland, Jr.	The Marvelettes*	2:26
11.	"The Weight"	Robbie Robertson	The Band	4:33

*Selections not in the motion picture The Big Chill.

==== Charts ====
Chart (1987)	Peak position
Australia (Kent Music Report)	25

== See also ==
- List of American films of 1983
- Return of the Secaucus 7
