= Evelyn Welch =

American art historian and academic administrator

Evelyn Welch MBE
- Born: Evelyn Kathleen Samuels; 1959 (age 66–67)
- Board member of: UCEA (2024-; UUK (2024-); Russell Group (2022-, ex officio); Worldwide Universities Network (2022-, ex officio); V&A Museum (2012-2016); Association of Art Historians (chair, 2007-2011)
- Spouses: Nick Welch (m. 1982; div. 1999); Peter Openshaw
- Children: 3, including Florence
- Relatives: John S. Samuels III (father); John Stockwell (brother)
- Awards: Wolfson History Prize; 2005 Shopping in the Renaissance: Consumer Cultures in Italy, 1400–1600

Academic background
- Education: Harvard University (BA); University of London (PhD)
- Thesis: Secular fresco painting at the court of Galeazzo Maria Sforza, 1466-1476 (1987)

Academic work
- Discipline: History, History of Art
- Sub-discipline: Renaissance History and Literature
- Institutions: University of Essex; Birkbeck, University of London; University of Sussex; Queen Mary University of London

14th Vice Chancellor of the University of Bristol
- Incumbent
- Assumed office September 2022
- Preceded by: Hugh Brady

Principal of King's College London
- Acting
- In office 1 February 2021 – 1 June 2021
- Preceded by: Ed Byrne
- Succeeded by: Shitij Kapur

Evelyn Kathleen Welch MBE (née Samuels; born 1959) is an American scholar of the Renaissance and Early Modern Period, and the 14th Vice Chancellor of the University of Bristol. She was previously a professor and academic administrator at King's College London, where she served as Interim Principal during 2021.

== Early life and education ==
Welch was born Evelyn Kathleen Samuels, the daughter of Ellen (Richards) and John S. Samuels III, a lawyer and coal magnate. Her younger brother is actor and film director John Stockwell. Educated at Phillips Exeter Academy, she graduated magna cum laude from Harvard University with a bachelor's degree in Renaissance history and literature, then moved to the United Kingdom in 1981 and completed her Ph.D. at the Warburg Institute, University of London.

== Career ==
Welch taught at the University of Essex, Birkbeck, University of London and the University of Sussex, where she also held an administrative position. She was Dean of Arts and Vice-Principal (Research & International) at Queen Mary University of London until 2013.

In 2013 she became professor of Renaissance Studies and Vice-Principal for Arts & Sciences at King's College London; two years later she was promoted to Provost, and she served as the Interim President and Principal from February to June 2021. Her final administrative position at King's was Senior Vice President for Service, People & Planning.

On 22 March 2022, the University of Bristol announced Welch's appointment as the next Vice Chancellor of the university, the first woman appointed to the post. She took up the role on 1 September 2022.

She specialises in the art of the Italian Renaissance and in material culture. Her books include Shopping in the Renaissance: Consumer Cultures in Italy, 1400–1600, a winner of the 2005 Wolfson History Prize. At King's College London, she oversaw major research projects including in 2005–2012 "Beyond Text: Performances, Sounds, Images, Objects", a strategic research programme funded by the Arts and Humanities Research Council. She was made a Wellcome Trust senior investigator for her project on 'Renaissance Skin'.

Welch was a member of the Victoria and Albert Museum Board of Trustees from 2012 to 2016. She has been a member of the British Library Advisory Board, the Chair of Trustees of the Dulwich Picture Gallery and Chair of the Advisory Council of the Warburg Institute, and served as chair of the Association of Art Historians from 2007 to 2011.

On 22nd April 2026 it was announced that Welch would become the Chair of the Russell Group taking over from Professor Chris Day in August 2026.

== Personal life ==
In 1982, Samuels married Nicholas Russell "Nick" Welch, a creative director with J. Walter Thompson in London and son of the editor Colin Welch; the couple divorced around 1999. She later remarried to Professor Peter Openshaw, an immunologist and professor of experimental medicine at Imperial College London. She is the mother of singer and songwriter Florence Welch, who is the frontwoman of the English rock band Florence and the Machine, and has two other children and three step-children.

== Controversy ==
As the Vice Chancellor is responsible for research at the University of Bristol, Welch has seen the university become the focus of a campaign to end the use of controversial forced swim tests (FSTs) at the university. Scientists at the University of Bristol have been involved in the forced swim test since 1998 and it has involved them placing rodents in inescapable containers of cold water for 15 minutes to observe their responses to what the scientists call a "life-threatening situation".

Welch, as Vice Chancellor has been publicly criticised on a number of occasions. One group of students occupied the lobby of Beacon House to demand that Welch personally respond to their request that the university end the FST. Subsequently, the animal rights group People for the Ethical Treatment of Animals has confronted Welch on two occasions on her continued backing for the university's use of the test, once at an alumni event in New York, and a second time at a panel event in Bristol which also included University of Birmingham Vice Chancellor Adam Tickell, and the then Labour Party shadow education minister Matt Western. In August 2024, Welch was the named recipient of an open letter from actress Anjelica Huston calling on her to end FSTs on rats and mice in labs at the university’s research departments.

The tests were discontinued in January 2025.

== Honours ==
Welsh was awarded an MBE in the 2013 Queen's Birthday Honours for "services to Higher Education and the Creative Economy".

== Selected works ==
- Art and Authority in Renaissance Milan. Yale University Press, 1995.
- Art and Society in Italy, 1350–1500 (Oxford History of Art series). Oxford University Press, 1997, ISBN 0-19-284245-5; reissued as Art in Renaissance Italy: 1350–1500 in 2000.
- Shopping in the Renaissance: Consumer Cultures in Italy, 1400–1600. Yale University Press, 2005.
- The Material Renaissance (editor). Manchester University Press, 2007.
- Making and Marketing Medicine in Renaissance Florence. Rodopi, 2011.
- Fashioning the Early Modern: Dress, Textiles and Innovation in Europe, 1500–1800 ((Pasold studies in textile history series). Oxford University Press, 2016.
- Renaissance Skin. Manchester University Press, 2025.
