= Charles Anderson Dana =

American journalist and government official (1819–1897)

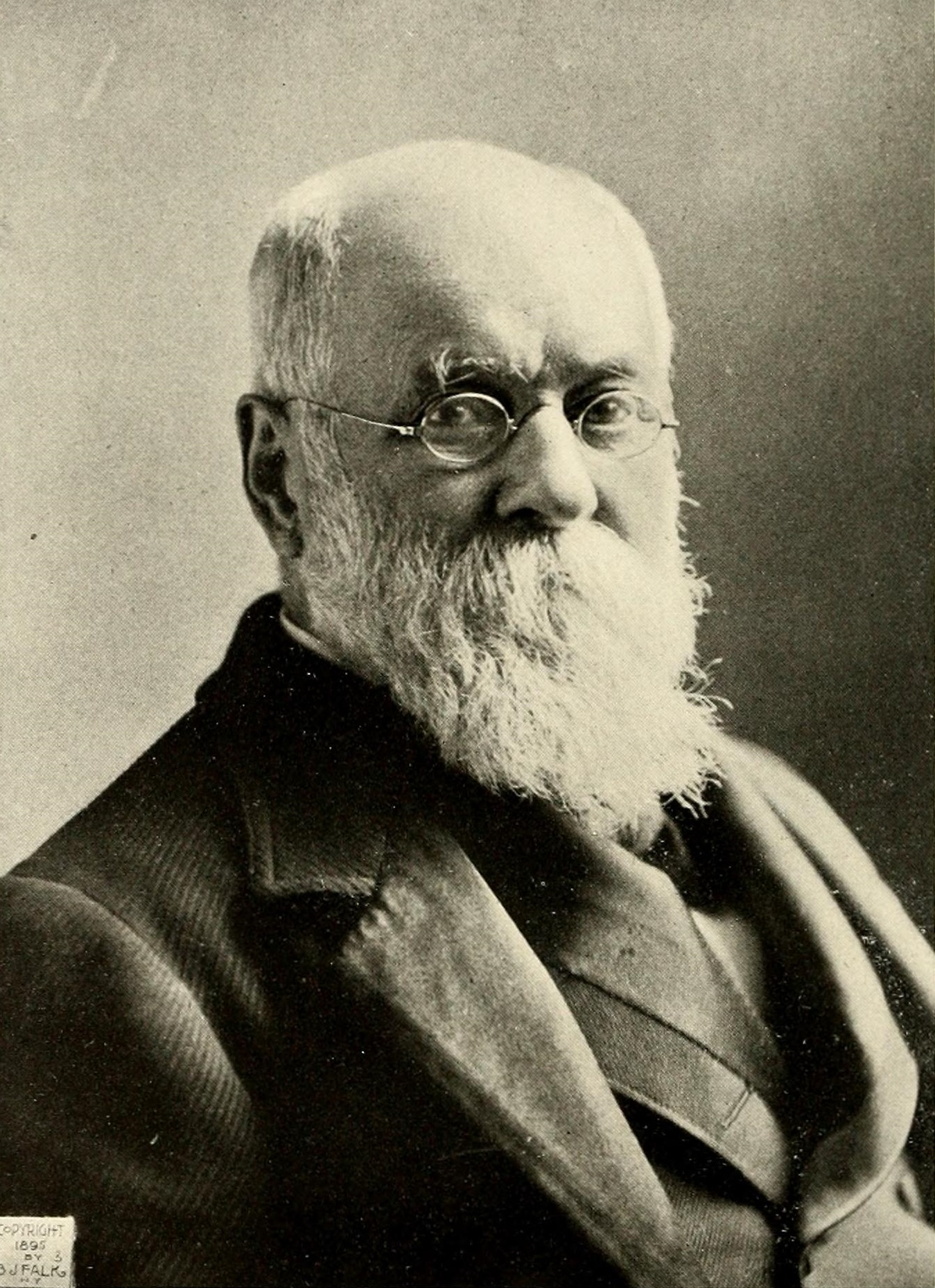
- Born: August 8, 1819; Hinsdale, New Hampshire, U.S.
- Died: October 17, 1897 (aged 78); Long Island, New York, U.S.
- Occupations: Journalist; Newspaper editor
- Relatives: Ruth Draper (granddaughter); Charles A. Dana (nephew)

Signature
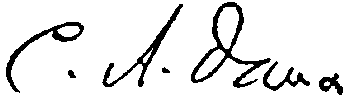

Charles Anderson Dana (August 8, 1819 – October 17, 1897) was an American journalist, author, and senior government official. He was a top aide to Horace Greeley as the managing editor of the powerful Republican newspaper New-York Tribune until 1862. During the American Civil War, he served as Assistant Secretary of War, playing especially the role of the liaison between the War Department and General Ulysses S. Grant. In 1868 he became the editor and part-owner of The New York Sun. He at first appealed to working class Democrats but after 1890 became a champion of business-oriented conservatism. Dana was an avid art collector of paintings and porcelains and boasted of being in possession of many items not found in several European museums.

== Early life ==
Dana was born in Hinsdale, New Hampshire on August 8, 1819. He was a descendant of Richard Dana, progenitor of most of the Danas in the United States, who emigrated from England, settled in Cambridge in 1640, and died there about 1695. At the age of twelve, Charles Dana became a clerk in his uncle's general store at Buffalo, until the store failed in 1837. At this time, he began the study of Latin grammar, and prepared himself for college. In 1839 he entered Harvard, but the impairment of his eyesight forced him to leave college in 1841. He also abandoned his intentions to study in Germany and enter the ministry. From September 1841 until March 1846 he lived at Brook Farm, where he was made one of the trustees of the farm, was head waiter when the farm became a Fourierite phalanx, and was in charge of the Phalanx's finances when its buildings were burned in 1846. During his time with Brook Farm, he also wrote for the Transcendental publication, the Harbinger. In 1846, he married widow Eunice Macdaniel.

== Journalism ==
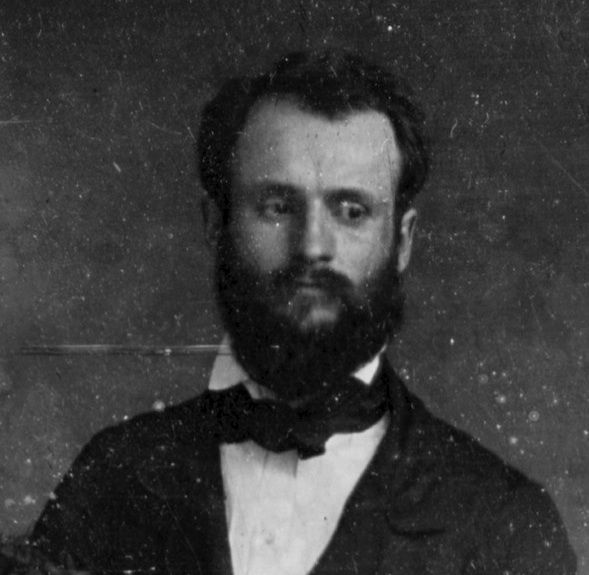
Dana during his tenure at the Tribune

Dana had written for and managed the Harbinger, the Brook Farm publication devoted to social reform and general literature. Later, beginning 1844, he also wrote for and edited the Boston Chronotype of Elizur Wright for two years. In 1847 he joined the staff of the New-York Tribune, and in 1848 he wrote from Europe letters to it and other papers on the revolutionary movements of that year. In Cologne he visited Karl Marx, one of his friends, and Ferdinand Freiligrath. (From 1852 to 1861, Marx was one of the main writers for the New-York Daily Tribune).

Returning to the Tribune in 1849, Dana became a proprietor and its managing editor, and in this capacity he actively promoted the anti-slavery cause, seeming to shape the paper's policy at a time when Horace Greeley was undecided and vacillating. However, in 1895, as editor of The Sun, he wrote "we are in the midst of a growing menace," the year of eventual black heavyweight champion Jack Johnson's first professional fight. "The black man is rapidly forging to the front ranks in athletics, especially in the field of fisticuffs. We are in the midst of a black rise against white supremacy" in the field of fistic sport.

When Charles A. Dana bought The Sun in 1868, he used the paper to support General Grant as the presidential candidate, aiming to unify the country during the aftermath of the Civil War. Shortly after, however, he became one of Grant's harshest critics. The extraordinary influence and circulation attained by the newspaper during the ten years preceding the Civil War was in a degree due to the development of Dana's genius for journalism, reflected not only in the making of the Tribune as a newspaper, but also in the management of its staff of writers and in the steadiness of its policy as the leading organ of anti-slavery sentiment.

In 1861, Dana went to Albany to advance the cause of Greeley as a candidate for the U. S. Senate, and nearly succeeded in nominating him. The caucus was about equally divided between Greeley's friends and those of William M. Evarts, while Ira Harris had a few votes that held the balance of power. At the instigation of Thurlow Weed, the supporters of Evarts went over to Harris.

During the first year of the war, the ideas of Greeley and of Dana as to the proper conduct of military operations were somewhat at variance; the board of managers of the Tribune asked for Dana's resignation in 1862, apparently because of this disagreement and wide temperamental differences between him and Greeley.

== Civil War ==
When Dana left the Tribune, Secretary of War, Edwin Stanton, made him a special commissioner of the War Department during the American Civil War. In this capacity, Dana discovered frauds committed by quartermasters and contractors. For instance, he was one of the commissioners who investigated irregularities perpetuated by quartermaster Ozias Hatch, who was accused of a "regular system of fraud". Dana was part of a commission that Abraham Lincoln created to quickly resolve the allegations against Hatch. As the eyes of the administration, as Lincoln called him, Dana spent much time at the front and sent to War Secretary Edwin Stanton frequent reports concerning the capacity and methods of various generals in the field. In particular, the War Department was concerned about rumors of Ulysses S. Grant's alcoholism. Dana spent considerable time with Grant, becoming a close friend and assuaging administration concerns. Dana reported to Secretary of War Stanton that he found Grant, as historian John D. Winters writes, to be "modest, honest, and judicial . . . 'not an original or brilliant man, but sincere, thoughtful, deep, and gifted with a courage that never faltered.' Although quiet and hard to know, he loved a humorous story and the company of his friends." Dana also observed the growing problem of cotton speculators, who were often going beyond established limits into rebel territory with the purpose of trading and often collaborating with the rebels. Dana warned President Lincoln and Stanton that the cotton trading and all related activity needed to be stopped, maintaining that General Grant was in full agreement with his assessment and recommendations. Dana went through the Vicksburg Campaign and was present at the Battle of Chickamauga and the Chattanooga campaign. He urged placing General Grant in supreme command of all the armies in the field, which Lincoln did on March 2, 1864. After returning to Washington, Dana received a telegram from assistant Secretary of War H. P. Watson instructing him to go to Washington to pursue another investigation, and he was received by Stanton, who offered him the position of Assistant Secretary of War, which he accepted. It was reported in the New York papers the next morning. Dana held this position from 1863 to 1865. With the likely exception of John Rawlins, Dana had a greater influence over Grant's military career than any other political or military man.

== Return to journalism ==
In 1865–1866, Dana conducted the newly established and unsuccessful Chicago Republican, when the paper was owned by Jacob Bunn, and published by A.W. (Alonzo) Mack (1822-1871). He became the editor and part-owner of The Sun, a New York City newspaper, in 1868, and remained in control of it until his death. Upon taking control of the organization, he announced his credo:

It will study condensation, clearness, point, and will endeavor to present its daily photograph of the whole world's doings in the most luminous and lively manner.

Under Dana's control, The Sun opposed the impeachment of President Andrew Johnson; it supported Grant for the presidency in 1868; it was a sharp critic of Grant as president; and in 1872 took part in the Liberal Republican revolt and urged Greeley's nomination. In contrast with "the young Dana [who was] touched by the Transcendental wand, a fiery youth, frank, open, trusting, a believer in the possibility of realizing an ideal society upon earth ... the Dana of the seventies and eighties and nineties [was] an aging cynic.... [H]e fought civil service reform tooth and nail.... He believed in expanding the American republic by wholesale land-grabbing.... He was opposed to the main aims of the labor movement.... Half the time he and the Sun were on the side of the worst politicians in Tammany, and against the reform movements in city government."

Dana made the Sun a Democratic newspaper, independent and outspoken in the expression of its opinions respecting the affairs of either party. His criticisms of civil maladministration during General Grant's terms as president led to a notable attempt on the part of that administration, in July 1873, to take him from New York on a charge of libel, to be tried without a jury in a Washington police court. Application was made to the United States District Court in New York for a warrant of removal, but in a memorable decision Judge Samuel Blatchford, later a justice of the Supreme Court of the United States, refused the warrant, holding the proposed form of trial to be unconstitutional. Perhaps to a greater extent than in the case of any other conspicuous journalist, Dana's personality was identified in the public mind with the newspaper that he edited.

In 1876, The Sun favored Samuel J. Tilden, the Democratic candidate for the presidency, opposed the Electoral Commission, and continually referred to Rutherford B. Hayes as the "fraud president". In 1884 it supported Benjamin Butler, the candidate of Greenback-Labor and Anti-Monopolist parties, for the presidency, and opposed James G. Blaine (Republican) and even more bitterly Grover Cleveland (Democrat). Circulation peaked about 150,000, and the advent of Joseph Pulitzer and the New York World cut deeply into the Sun's circulation. Dana was a very old-fashioned publisher who distrusted the Linotype and relied not on advertising but on the two-cent cover price for his funding.

In 1888 it supported Cleveland and opposed Benjamin Harrison, although it had bitterly criticized Cleveland's first administration, and was to criticize nearly every detail of his second, with the exception of Federal interference in the Pullman strike of 1894; and in 1896, on the free silver issue, it opposed William Jennings Bryan, the Democratic candidate for the presidency. In a word, the Sun had abandoned its original working-class clientele and was now a staunch supporter of the conservative business community. he died in New York on October 17, 1897 at 78.

== Writing ==
Dana's literary style came to be the style of The Sun—simple, strong, clear, boiled down. He recorded no theories of journalism other than those of common sense and human interest. He was impatient of prolixity, cant, and the conventional standards of news importance. Three of his lectures on journalism were published in 1895 as the Art of Newspaper Making.

With George Ripley he edited The New American Cyclopaedia (1857–1863), reissued as the American Cyclopaedia in 1873–1876.

Dana had an interest in literature. His first book was a volume of stories translated from German, entitled The Black Aunt (New York and Leipzig, 1848). In 1857, he edited an anthology, The Household Book of Poetry. His translation from German of "Nutcracker and Sugardolly: A Fairy Tale" was published in 1856 by the Philadelphia publisher C.G. Henderson & Co. In addition to translating German, Dana could read the Romance and Scandinavian languages. With Rossiter Johnson, he edited, Fifty Perfect Poems (New York, 1883).

Dana edited The Life of Ulysses S. Grant: General of the Armies of the United States, published over his name and that of General James H. Wilson in 1868. His Recollections of the Civil War and Eastern Journeys: Some Notes of Travel in Russia, in the Caucasus, and to Jerusalem were published in 1898.

Early in his journalism career, in 1849, he wrote a series of newspaper articles in defense of anarchist philosopher Pierre-Joseph Proudhon and his mutual banking ideas. They were published in collected form in 1896 as Proudhon and His Bank of the People by Benjamin Tucker, who did so partly to expose Dana's radical past, as Dana had late in life become quite conservative, editorializing against radicals, "reds," and the free silver movement. This book remains in print today through a Charles H. Kerr Company Publishers edition with an introduction by Paul Avrich.

== Art collecting ==
Dana was an art collector. In 1880 he built a large residence in New York City on the corner of Madison Avenue and 60th Street and furnished it with paintings, tapestries, and Chinese porcelains, giving his greatest attention to his porcelains. He devoted much time and historical study in these areas of art throughout his life. An unnamed connoisseur praised the historical value and quality of items in his collection, noting that "they are not in the British Museum; they are not in the Louvre; and they are conspicuously absent at Dresden."

== Dosoris ==
In 1873, he purchased a home on Dosoris Island on Glen Cove, Long Island, where he planted a "world renowned arboretum," with rare trees from America, Europe and Asia. Aside from bringing in America's pre-eminent landscape designer, Frederick Law Olmsted, to lay out a network of winding paths through which to enjoy this "fairyland of trees and flowers," Dana also brought in a specialist to live there year round whose job it was to acclimatize the foreign species. He welcomed arboriculturists from all over the country to study and admire what he planted here, including such unlikely and romantic specimens as the oaks grown from acorns found on the tomb of the ancient Chinese philosopher, Confucius.

The bucolic 'island' - that is all but an island except for a narrow causeway connecting it to the mainland - consists of 46-acres with a 28-acre pond. A contemporary write-up from 1889 described, "a seawall is built all around the island, and it is draped and festooned with Matrimony vine, our native Bitter-sweet, a Japanese species of the same genus, and Periploca Graeca, which are planted on top". Dana may have lived in the original house built by the Reverend Benjamin Woolseys back in 1745.

== See also ==
- Bibliography of the American Civil War
- Bibliography of Ulysses S. Grant

Government offices
| Preceded by Christopher Wolcott | Assistant Secretary of War; 1864–1866 | Succeeded by Thomas T. Eckert |
