= Peter Openshaw (immunologist) =

British physician and immunologist

Peter Openshaw CBE, FRCP, FMedSci
- Born: 11 November 1954 (age 71); Glastonbury, Somerset, England
- Education: Guy's Hospital
- Spouse: Evelyn Welch
- Relatives: Florence Welch
- Scientific career
- Fields: Immunology
- Workplaces: Imperial College London
- Thesis: Benefit and harm from immunity to respiratory syncytial virus (1988)

Peter John Morland Openshaw, CBE, FRCP, FMedSci (born 11 November 1954) is a British immunologist and scientist specialising in lung immunology, particularly defence against viral infections. He trained in lung diseases and undertook a PhD in immunology before establishing a laboratory at St Mary's Hospital Medical School (later part of Imperial College London). He created the academic department of Respiratory Medicine and the Centre for Respiratory Infection at Imperial College and was elected President of the British Society for Immunology in 2014.

== Early life ==
Openshaw was born in 1954 in Glastonbury, Somerset. He attended Millfield Junior School, then the Quaker boarding schools Sidcot School and Bootham School, followed by Guy's Hospital Medical School (University of London). He earned an intercalated BSc in Physiology (Hons., 1976), qualified in medicine (MB BS, 1979), and worked at the Royal Brompton Hospital and as medical registrar at Royal Postgraduate Medical School (Hammersmith Hospital).

== Career ==
Immunological work

Originally trained in lung mechanics, his PhD at the National Institute for Medical Research at Mill Hill, London was in T cell immunology. He has worked on protective and harmful immunological reactions to viruses, inflammatory lung disease and vaccine development since 1985, writing over 300 scientific articles (h-index= 101). He was President of the British Society for Immunology between 2013 and 2018, the first clinician to hold the role. Openshaw was a member of the Academy of Medical Sciences and British Society for Immunology expert taskforce on COVID-19.

Respiratory virus research

He was awarded the Chanock prize (2012, Santa Fe USA) in recognition of his lifetime achievement in work on respiratory syncytial virus (RSV) research. He has been involved in influenza policy since 2002 as a member of UK advisory boards and was Vice President of European Scientific Working Group on Influenza (ESWI) from 2009-2014. In 2009 he set up the MOSAIC consortium, a collaboration of 45 co-investigators studying the host response to influenza in patients admitted to 11 hospitals in London and Liverpool (Wellcome Trust/MRC support) and directs studies of viral challenge of human volunteers.

He was Theme Lead for the Respiratory Theme and later the Infection Theme of the NIHR Imperial Biomedical Research Centre. He served as Head of the Respiratory Infections Section at the National Heart and Lung Institute, a department of Imperial College London, until July 2024.

Academic leadership

Openshaw established the academic department of Respiratory Medicine on the St Mary's Campus of Imperial College and created the Centre for Respiratory Infection (Wellcome Trust funded). He has sat on numerous governmental, grant awarding and international committees.

He was elected an Imperial College Consul for the Faculty of Medicine in 2016, becoming Senior Consul in 2019 and then Proconsul. He co-chaired Imperial's Working Together Task Group in 2021.

Advisory

Openshaw is a member of the New and Emerging Respiratory Virus Threats Advisory Group (NERVTAG) in the UK. He is a Trustee of the Science Media Centre, the Academy of Medical Sciences and the International Society for Respiratory Viruses (ISRV) https://www.isrv.global/who-we-are/organization/#section-3.

== Honours ==
Openshaw is a Fellow of the Royal College of Physicians (1994), a Fellow of the Academy of Medical Sciences (1999) and a Fellow of the Society of Biology (2014). He was selected as Senior Investigator by National Institute for Health Research (NIHR) in 2013 and 2020.

Openshaw was appointed Commander of the Order of the British Empire (CBE) in the 2022 New Year Honours for services to medicine and immunology.

== Selected publications ==
- Hansel, TT; Johnston, SL; Openshaw, PJ (2013). "Microbes and mucosal immune responses in asthma". Lancet. 381 (9869): 861–873. doi:10.1016/S0140-6736(12)62202-8. PMID 23428115. S2CID 24596808.
- Chiu, C; Openshaw, PJ (2015). "Antiviral B cell and T cell immunity in the lungs". Nature Immunology. 16 (1): 18–26. doi:10.1038/ni.3056. PMC 7097128. PMID 25521681.
- Habibi, Maximillian S.; Thwaites, Ryan S.; Openshaw, Peter; et al. (9 October 2020). "Neutrophilic inflammation in the respiratory mucosa predisposes to RSV infection". Science. 370 (6513). doi:10.1126/science.aba9301. ISSN 0036-8075. PMC 7613218. PMID 33033192.
- Thwaites, Ryan S; Sanchez Sevilla Uruchurtu, Ashley; Openshaw, Peter; et al. (4 March 2021). "Inflammatory profiles across the spectrum of disease reveal a distinct role for GM-CSF in severe COVID-19". Science Immunology. 6 (57). doi:10.1126/sciimmunol.abg9873. ISSN 2470-9468. PMC 8128298. PMID 33692097.
- Openshaw, Peter J. M. (7 January 2022). "Using correlates to accelerate vaccinology". Science. 375 (6576): 22–23. Bibcode:2022Sci...375...22O. doi:10.1126/science.abn0007. ISSN 0036-8075. PMID 34990231.
- Pairo-Castineira, Erola; Rawlik, Konrad; Openshaw, Peter; et al. (25 May 2023). "GWAS and meta-analysis identifies 49 genetic variants underlying critical COVID-19". Nature. 617 (7962): 764–768. doi:10.1038/s41586-023-06034-3. ISSN 0028-0836. PMC 10208981. PMID 37198478.
- Thwaites, Ryan S.; Uruchurtu, Ashley S. S.; Openshaw, Peter; et al. (5 December 2023). "Early mucosal events promote distinct mucosal and systemic antibody responses to live attenuated influenza vaccine". Nature Communications. 14 (1): 8053. Bibcode:2023NatCo..14.8053T. doi:10.1038/s41467-023-43842-7. ISSN 2041-1723. PMC 10697962. PMID 38052824.
- Sidhu, Jasmin K; Siggins, Matthew K; Openshaw, Peter J M; et al. (22 December 2023). "Delayed Mucosal Antiviral Responses Despite Robust Peripheral Inflammation in Fatal COVID-19". The Journal of Infectious Diseases. 230: e17–e29. doi:10.1093/infdis/jiad590. hdl:20.500.11820/bed8141e-e4f2-482e-beae-1d084fe9ae37. ISSN 0022-1899. PMC 11272059. PMID 38134401.
- Wagstaffe, Helen R.; Thwaites, Ryan S.; Openshaw, Peter; et al. (2 September 2024). "Mucosal and systemic immune correlates of viral control after SARS-CoV-2 infection challenge in seronegative adults". Science Immunology. 9 (92) eadj9285. doi:10.1126/sciimmunol.adj9285. hdl:1959.4/104989. ISSN 2470-9468. PMID 38335268.

== Personal life ==
Openshaw has sons (Sam and Jonathan), a daughter (Madeleine) and four direct grandchildren. He also has a step son (John James Welch) two step daughters Florence Welch and Grace Welch.
