= Men Don't Leave =

1990 US comedy-drama film by Paul Brickman

- Theatrical release poster
- Directed by: Paul Brickman
- Screenplay by: Barbara Benedek; Paul Brickman
- Story by: Barbara Benedek
- Based on: La Vie Continue by Moshé Mizrahi
- Produced by: Jon Avnet
- Starring: Jessica Lange; Arliss Howard; Joan Cusack
- Cinematography: Bruce Surtees
- Edited by: Richard Chew
- Music by: Thomas Newman
- Production company: The Geffen Company
- Distributed by: Warner Bros.
- Release date: February 2, 1990
- Running time: 115 minutes
- Country: United States
- Language: English
- Budget: $7 million
- Box office: $6 million

Men Don't Leave is a 1990 American comedy-drama film starring Jessica Lange as a housewife who, after the death of her husband, moves with her two sons to Baltimore. Chris O'Donnell, Arliss Howard, Joan Cusack, Charlie Korsmo and Kathy Bates also co-star in this film. The film, directed by Paul Brickman and co-written with Barbara Benedek, is a remake of the 1981 French film La Vie Continue. The original music score was composed by Thomas Newman. Warner Home Video released the film on DVD for the first time on September 15, 2009, as part of the "Warner Archive Collection".

== Plot ==
Weighed down by her late contractor husband's debts in Bingham, Maryland, widowed mother Beth Macauley is compelled to sell her house and move to a less costly locale. She relocates to Baltimore with her sons Chris and Matt and takes a job at a gourmet food store managed by Lisa Coleman. 16 year-old Chris turns angry and aggressive while 7 year-old Matt hides his deep sense of loss under a steely exterior. Beth is drawn into a relationship with Charles Simon, a musician who builds her self-esteem. However, after losing her job, she plunges into a five-day depression during which she refuses to leave her bedroom.

Beth is a vulnerable, easily discouraged person who cannot seem to get a grip on her circumstances. Chris falls in love with Jody, an older radiographer who lives in the same building. Shortly after Chris turns 17, he announces he's moving in with Jody. Matt falls under the influence of a schoolmate who breaks into houses and steals VCRs. His dream is to get enough money to buy back their suburban house. Beth and her sons eventually pull themselves together, and realize that to abandon each other is not the answer. Beth tells her sons, "Heartbreak is life educating us," and the lessons turn out to be worth learning.

== Cast ==
- Jessica Lange as Beth Macauley
- Arliss Howard as Charles Simon
- Joan Cusack as Jody
- Chris O'Donnell as Chris Macauley
- Kathy Bates as Lisa Coleman
- Charlie Korsmo as Matt Macauley
- Belita Moreno as Mrs. Buckley
- Deanna Dunagan as Fay
- Tom Mason as John Macauley
- Corey Carrier as Winston Buckley
- Kevin Corrigan as Mike
- David Cale as Fred
- Constance Shulman as Carly
- Rick Rubin as Craig
- Jim Haynie as Mr. Buckley

== Production ==
The film was shot in Baltimore. Electrician Patrick Dungan died during the production after a portable rain-making machine, he and another man were pushing, hit an overhead electric wire and he was electrocuted. The other man let go before it hit the wire.

== Reception ==
The film received generally positive reviews. It has a score of 83% on Rotten Tomatoes based on eighteen reviews, with an average rating of 7/10. Audiences polled by CinemaScore gave the film an average grade of "B" on an A+ to F scale.

Shelia Benson of the Los Angeles Times praised the film as "a tender, beautifully acted, diabolically droll film on the subject of love, loss and the sheer blissful unpredictability of life."

Roger Ebert said that the film "is the story of how a warm and believable suburban wife and mother becomes a widow who is trapped in a series of Hollywood improbabilities. The movie opens with enormous appeal and then spends its last hour chipping away at the sympathy it has earned. By the end, when some scenes are from the cliche factory and others seem to be missing altogether, I felt a great disappointment: The story started out too strongly to end as such a mess."

Janet Maslin of The New York Times recalled that "among the film's more memorable moments is the scene in which Beth, having collapsed into such depression that she sits in a littered apartment eating cold spaghetti out of a can, is serenaded by her musician friend to the tune of Bella Notte, the Italian restaurant song from Lady and the Tramp. Bruce Surtees's cinematography gives the film a warm, vibrant look that's particularly flattering to its star. The editing is so abrupt in spots that it suggests there may have been more to Men Don't Leave at some earlier stage."

Peter Travers of Rolling Stone said that "Brickman has made an imperfect movie but not an impersonal one. Combining humor and heartbreak with rare grace, Men Don’t Leave means to get under your skin and does."

Lange's performance was praised by critics.

=== Box office ===
The film was unsuccessful at the box office, grossing just over $6 million in the US on a $7 million budget.
