= Salutation (estate) =

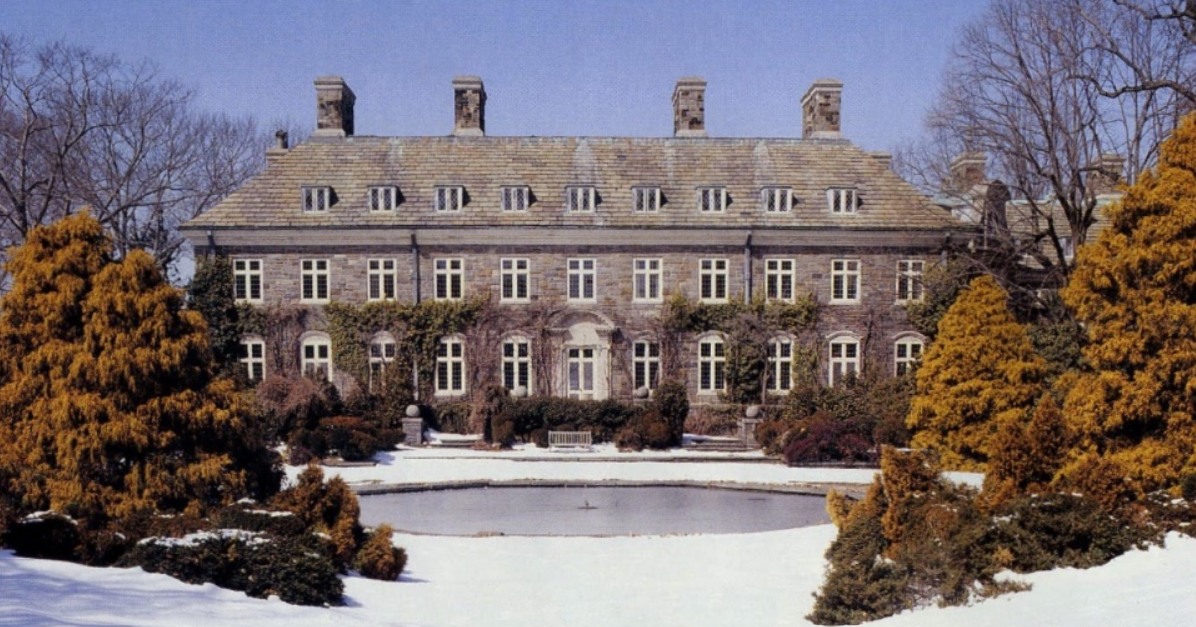
- Interactive map of the Salutation area

General information
- Type: House
- Architectural style: Georgian Colonial
- Location: Glen Cove, Long Island, New York
- Coordinates: 40°53′36″N 73°38′22″W
- Construction started: 1919
- Completed: 1929

Technical details
- Floor area: 27,000 square feet (2,500 m^{2})

Design and construction
- Architect: Roger Bullard

Other information
- Number of rooms: 45

The Salutation estate is a 45-room Colonial Revival mansion on West Island, in Glen Cove, Long Island. The house was built in 1929 by architect Roger Bullard for Junius Spencer Morgan III. Master iron worker Samuel Yellin also worked on this house. The home was originally constructed in 1919, with a later addition completed in 1929. It was used as the main residence for Junius Spencer Morgan III and his family.

The home is 27,000 square feet (2,500 m^{2}) and has had only three owners. In 1974, Junius Spencer Morgan III sold the estate to John Stockwell Samuels, III, a Texas-born coal magnate, prominent lawyer, and father to actor John Stockwell. In 1993, the estate on 21.46 acres (8.68 ha) was for sale by the United States Bankruptcy Court for the Eastern District of New York for $5.7 million, and was purchased by Margo Walker, a real estate broker and socialite, for $9 million. In 2017, the home was put up for sale again, along with the other homes on the island, for the price of $125 million.

The home's guest house, known as "Creek House", served as a weekend refuge for Jackie Kennedy in 1964, after the assassination of her husband, President John F. Kennedy.

== In popular culture ==
- It is likely the inspiration for "West Egg" in The Great Gatsby.
- The interior of the home was used to portray the Larrabee family mansion in the movie, Sabrina.
- The house was used as the Bradford mansion, in the movie, A Perfect Murder.
- In 2018, on the television show, Succession, in the season 2 episode, "Tern Haven".
- In 2013, as the home of the Pierce family on the NBC mini-series, Deception.
- The terrace and pool of the estate were used on the television show, Gotham, in season 1, episode 9, "Harvey Dent".
- In 2023, it was used as the site of a "wealth retreat" in the HBO reboot of the television show, Gossip Girl, season 2, episode 9, 'I Know What You Did Last Summit'.
