= Eugene V. Debs Cooperative House =

Housing cooperative

Coordinates: 42°16′11.489″N 83°44′7.314″W

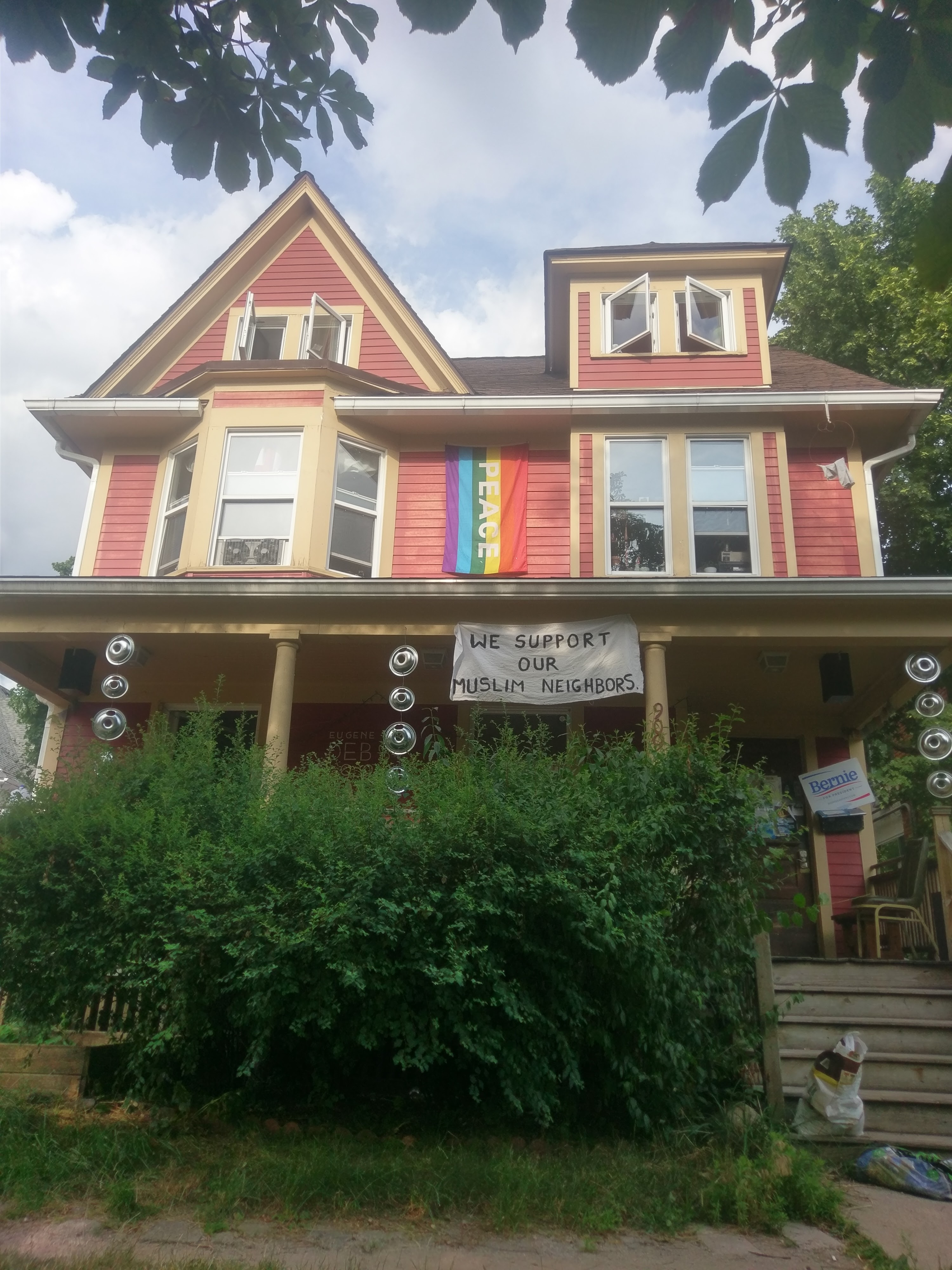
E. V. Debs Cooperative House

The Eugene V. Debs Cooperative House is a student housing cooperative founded in 1967, one of the 18 cooperative houses which make up the Inter-Cooperative Council at the University of Michigan. Debs Cooperative is located at 909 East University Avenue in Ann Arbor, Michigan, and is named for Socialist Party candidate Eugene V. Debs. Debs has a reputation for being politically active, socially conscious, and environmentally focused. House funds go towards maintenance and the purchase of organic food, and members of the house cook vegetarian and vegan meals five nights a week.

== History ==
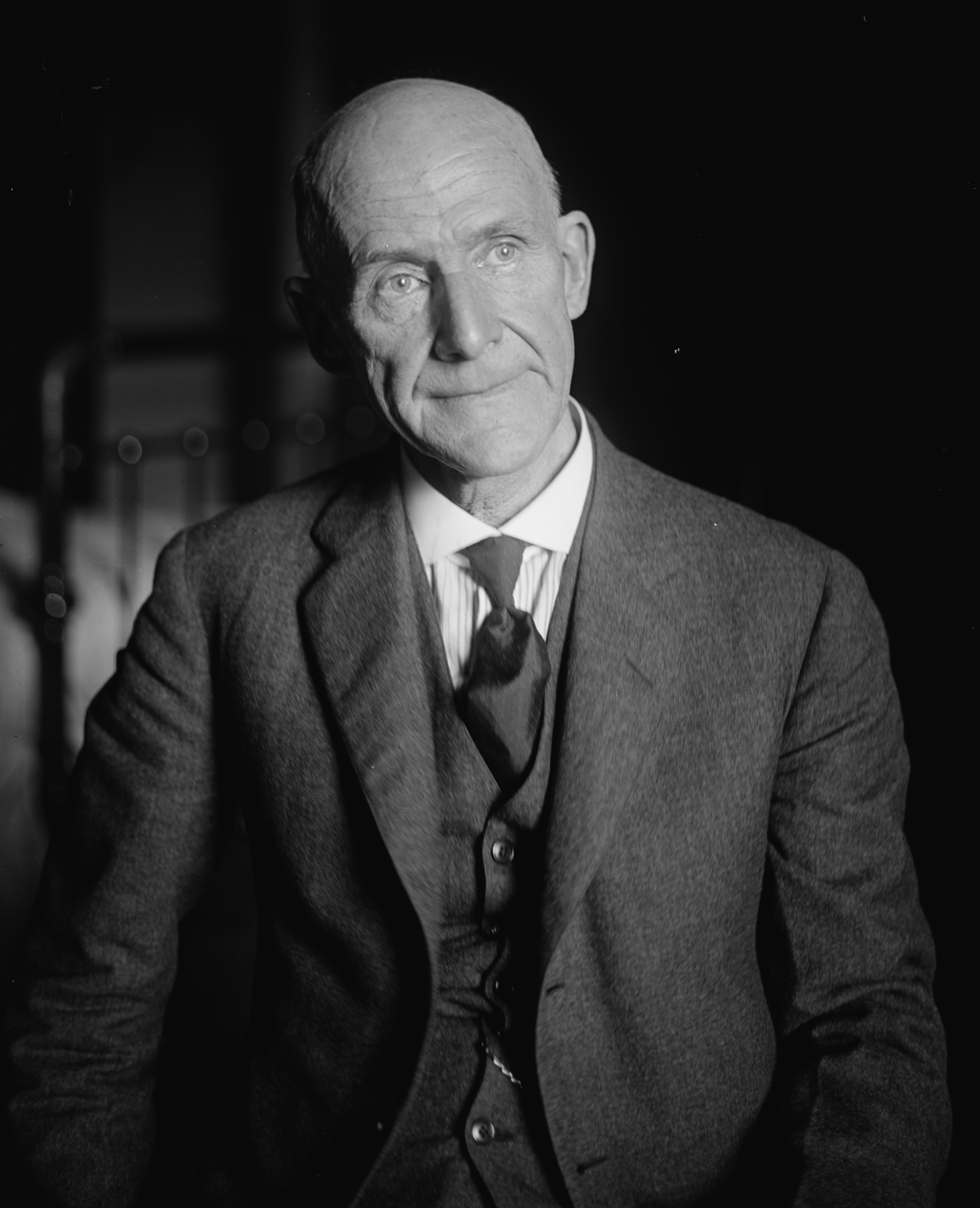
Eugene Debs, for whom the house is named

The structure at 909 E. University Avenue was built in 1905 as a three-story single family home. In 1939, the house was rented by former members of Rochdale Cooperative House, another Ann Arbor cooperative, and opened under the name Congress House. In 1940, Congress House was relocated and the building was renamed the Muriel Lester Cooperative House, after British peace activist Muriel Lester. Lester Cooperative offered interracial and interfaith women's housing until 1943, when it too was relocated and the building at 909 E. University was sold. During a period of expansive growth beginning in the early 1960s, the Inter-Cooperative Council looked into re-acquiring the building from its owners, Mr. and Mrs. Leonard F. Field. After a lengthy process of negotiations, the house was purchased on May 1, 1967, for a price of $49,500 (approx. $358,000 in 2016 inflation-adjusted dollars) and was opened as the Eugene V. Debs Cooperative House. It originally operated as an all-boys' cooperative house, with two apartment rooms available for married students. By the mid-1970s, this was changed to allow students of any gender, and it remains a mixed-gender house today.

Screenwriter and director Lawrence Kasdan lived at Debs Cooperative in the late 1960s, and his experiences at the co-op served as a basis for the 1983 film The Big Chill. Many of the characters were based on his housemates, and the ways in which they cook communal meals and share their house echo the culture of Ann Arbor cooperatives.

== Structure ==
Debs Cooperative is a 3-story frame house, with 15 residential rooms capable of housing 23 students. It has a shared kitchen, dining room, and two common rooms, one located on the ground floor and one in the basement. The yard has a shed for bikes and garden supplies, an outdoor compost bin, and several garden beds.

== See also ==
- Inter-Cooperative Council
- Eugene V. Debs
- Eugene V. Debs Home
