= Barbara Benedek =

American screenwriter

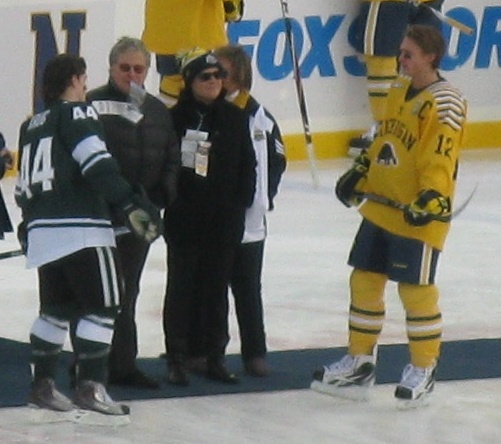
Benedek and The Big Chill co-writer Lawrence Kasdan participate in the ceremonial puck drop for The Big Chill at the Big House ice hockey game in 2010, flanked by Michigan State men's ice hockey captain Torey Krug and Michigan men's ice hockey co-captain Carl Hagelin

Barbara Benedek (born 1948) is an American screenwriter best known for co-writing the 1983 film The Big Chill, for which she received a Writers Guild of America Award and several award nominations.

== Career ==
Benedek was a psychiatric researcher prior to becoming interested in screenwriting. Her first entertainment industry job was as sitcom storywriter and editor for Witt/Thomas/Harris Productions.

Her first film screenplay was for the 1983 comedy-drama film The Big Chill. For her work on the film she received, along with co-writer Lawrence Kasdan, the Writers Guild of America Award for Best Original Screenplay in 1984. She was also nominated for the Academy Award for Best Original Screenplay, Golden Globe Award for Best Screenplay, BAFTA Award for Best Original Screenplay, and was runner-up for the Los Angeles Film Critics Association Award.

She went on to write screenplays for Immediate Family (1989) and Men Don't Leave (1990). In his two-star review of Men Don't Leave, Roger Ebert speculated that Benedek's screenplay started out "a good deal more realistic and honest," but that it was subject to detrimental revisions in the filmmaking process.

Benedek was an uncredited writer for the 1990 film Pretty Woman. According to director Garry Marshall, "We had five different writers on Pretty Woman ... In all the rewrites, the part of Vivian, the prostitute, came quite easily. It was the character of the businessman, Edward Lewis, that presented the most problems. Only Barbara Benedek, the sole woman writer in the group, got the voice of Edward down by creating a Donald Trump-style executive with a vulnerable side."

In 1995 Benedek wrote the screenplay for Sabrina, a remake of a 1954 film of the same name. It began as a fully original screenplay. Due to similarities to the 1954 film, producer Scott Rudin suggested adapting that story instead.

== Filmography ==
- The Big Chill (1983)
- Immediate Family (1989)
- Men Don't Leave (1990)
- Sabrina (1995)
