= John Stockwell (actor) =

American actor and director

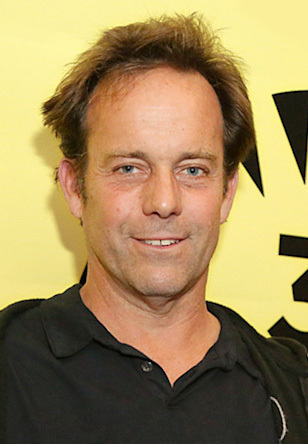
- Stockwell at the 2014 Miami International Film Festival presentation of Kid Cannabis
- Born: John Stockwell Samuels IV; March 25, 1961 (age 65); Galveston, Texas, United States
- Occupations: Actor, filmmaker
- Years active: 1981–present
- Notable work: Top Gun; Christine; Into the Blue; Blue Crush; Crazy/Beautiful; Cheaters
- Spouse: Helene Henderson
- Children: 3
- Relatives: Evelyn Welch (sister); Florence Welch (niece)

John Stockwell Samuels IV (born March 25, 1961) is an American actor and filmmaker. For his work on the television film Cheaters (2000), Stockwell was nominated for the Primetime Emmy Award for Outstanding Writing for a Limited Series, Movie, or Dramatic Special.

== Early life ==
Stockwell was born in Galveston, Texas, the son of Ellen (Richards) and John S. Samuels III, an attorney. Stockwell's sister is historian Evelyn Welch, and his niece is singer and songwriter Florence Welch. His father, a Texas lawyer and coal magnate, purchased Salutation in Glen Cove, Long Island.

While he was in college at Harvard University near Boston, he commuted to New York City to appear on episodes of the soap opera Guiding Light.

== Career ==
Early in his career, Stockwell was an international model. During this time, he became a friend of pop artist Andy Warhol. Stockwell's first feature film as an actor came in a small role in 1981's So Fine. His best known roles came in the 1983 comedy film Losin' It as Spider; later that year, in the John Carpenter horror film Christine as Dennis Guilder; and the 1985 comedy film My Science Project as Michael Harlan. Also in 1985, he appeared in the poorly received City Limits.

He performed in the highly acclaimed 1985 TV mini-series North and South. In 1986, he appeared in Top Gun as Cougar. He made guest appearances on TV shows including The Young Riders and Friday the 13th: The Series.

Stockwell has directed several films, including Cheaters (2000), Crazy/Beautiful (2001), Blue Crush (2002), Into the Blue (2005), Turistas (2006), Heart (2009), the Gina Carano star-vehicle In the Blood, and the 2016 Kickboxer reboot Kickboxer: Vengeance.

Stockwell wrote the screenplay for the 2001 film Rock Star.

== Personal life ==
Stockwell briefly dated actress Bianca Jagger and model Barbara Allen.

Stockwell is married to Helene Henderson, a chef and caterer. They have three children.

== Filmography ==
=== Actor ===
Year	Title	Role	Notes
1981	So Fine	Jim Sterling	
1983	Losin' It	"Spider"	
1983	Christine	Dennis Guilder	
1983	Quarterback Princess	Scott Massey	Television film
1983	Eddie and the Cruisers	Keith Livingston	
1985	North and South	Billy Hazard	Miniseries
1985	City Limits	Lee	
1985	My Science Project	Michael Harlan	
1985	Radioactive Dreams	Phillip Chandler	
1986	Dangerously Close	Randy McDevitt	
1986	Top Gun	Lieutenant Bill "Cougar" Cortell	
1987	Billionaire Boys Club	Brad Sedgwick	
1988	Friday the 13th: The Series	Tim Ayres	Episode: "Badge of Honor"
1989	Nightmare Classics	Malcolm Barrington	Episode: "The Eyes of the Panther"
1991	Born to Ride	Captain Jack Hassler	
1991	Millions	David Phipps	
1995	Nixon	Staffer #1	
1995	I Shot a Man in Vegas	Grant	
1995	Aurora: Operation Intercept	Andy Aldrich	
1997	Breast Men	Robert Renaud	Television film
1997	Legal Deceit	Adam	
1997	Stag	Victor Mallick	
1997	The Nurse	Jack Martin	
2000	Cheaters	News Producer	Television film
2006	Turistas	Male Backpacker	
2012	Breaking the Girls	David Layton	

=== Director ===
- Under Cover (1987)
- Cheaters (2000) (Television film)
- Crazy/Beautiful (2001)
- Blue Crush (2002)
- The Break (2003) (Television film)
- Into the Blue (2005)
- Turistas (2006)
- The L Word (2007–2009) (6 episodes)
- Middle of Nowhere (2008)
- Heart (2009)
- Cat Run (2011)
- Killer in the Family (2011)
- Dark Tide (2012)
- Seal Team Six: The Raid on Osama Bin Laden (2012)
- In the Blood (2014)
- Kid Cannabis (2014)
- Cat Run 2 (2014)
- Kickboxer: Vengeance (2016)
- Countdown (2016)
- Armed Response (2017)

=== Writer ===
- Rock Star (2001)
