= Coal baron =

Wealthy and influential owner of coal mines

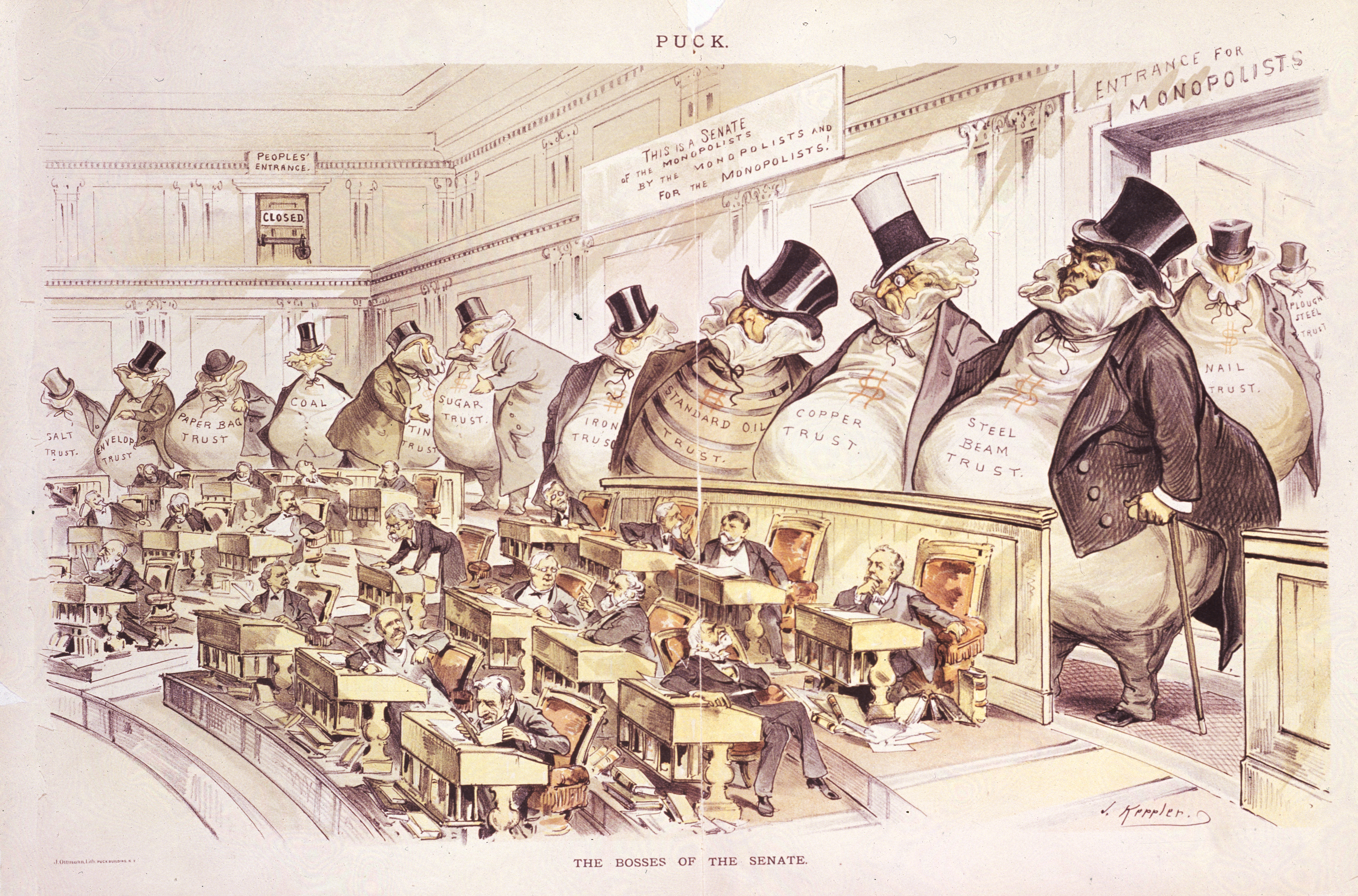
Joseph Keppler's 1889 cartoon depicting monopolists as dominating American politics as the "Bosses of the Senate".

A coal baron is a term colloquially used to describe an entrepreneur or industrialist who possesses great power or influence through the possession and operation of coal mines. The phenomenon exists in North America, South America, Europe, Africa, Asia, and Australia. Coal barons reached their peak influence between the 1880s and the 1950s.

== History ==
=== United States ===
The Appalachia region of the United States is one of the world's largest coal producing provinces and contains the largest field of high-grade anthracite coal in the world in northeastern Pennsylvania. When the country began industrializing in the 19th century, businessmen saw the opportunity to profit by mining coal to feed the nearby industrial cities of the east coast and Midwest, as well as to provide an alternative to wood as an indoor fuel source. Coal mining businesses were often established by individual entrepreneurs or partnerships of a few people, often from outside the region, who sought to capitalize on this emerging market. The earliest anthracite mines were established in the 1820s and 30s but as industrial demand increased and infrastructure made more areas available for mining, aspiring coal barons moved into the lower-quality bituminous and sub-bituminous fields of central and southern Appalachia, as well as into Rocky Mountains, particularly Colorado.

Because the mountainous environments of the Appalachians and Rockies are rural, low-population, and hard to access, large-scale coal mines typically necessitated the construction of a company town and the hiring of outside workers, often immigrants. These towns housed the miners and sometimes their families and were run directly by the mining company, often by the owner personally. Owners managed company towns with the intent of maximizing worker productivity. Attitudes and strategies varied, with some believing that providing good living conditions and amenities would improve production and others not wanting to invest their money in expenses not directly related to extraction of coal. The concentration of workers in company towns and the direct relationship between their quality of life and the actions of their bosses frequently made coal mines major sites of labor organizing and agitation. One of the hallmarks of coal barons and other industrial elites of the time was their extreme opposition to any sort of organized labor. They believed that it upset the natural order of relations and that the threat of a strike was extremely dangerous to the nation's economy and livelihood. Coal, as an efficient and compact source of large quantities of energy, was identified by coal barons, politicians, other industrial magnates, and citizens alike as the foundation of an industrialized economy and coal companies and national governments placed significant value on the continued extraction and flow of coal to industrial centers. In the United States particularly, this meant that labor disputes sometimes resulted in violence, including the famous incidents of the Battle of Blair Mountain and the Ludlow Massacre.

In the late 19th and early 20th century coal mining operations began to consolidate. Large-scale expansion into central and southern Appalachia increased supply of coal and made it difficult for small scale entrepreneurs to sustain themselves, resulting in them selling out to large, already established coal corporations. This marked the gradual end of the on-site owner-operator coal baron who personally managed the mine and company town and the shift towards wealthy industrialists who had little personal involvement in operations. In the wake of the Ludlow Massacre and other strikes in the early 20th century, these large coal corporations tended towards accepting more workers rights and workplace safety in order to prevent frequent, industry-disrupting strikes. Despite this, the policies of coal barons then and today remain largely determined by the personal beliefs and methods of the individual owner. For example, in the late 20th and early 21st century, West Virginian coal baron Don Blankenship was indicted for several cases of allegedly conspiring to commit mine safety violations and was reported to encourage circumvention of mine safety protocols and worker's rights.

== Notable examples ==
- Gautam Adani
- Edward Julius Berwind
- Don Blankenship
- Eldad Cicero Camp
- Chris Cline
- Eckley Brinton Coxe
- Jim Justice
- Joe Manchin
- Ario Pardee
- Gina Rinehart
- Pavel Tykač

== See also ==
- Business magnate
- Business oligarch
- Media proprietor
