= Junius Spencer Morgan III =

American banker (1892–1960)

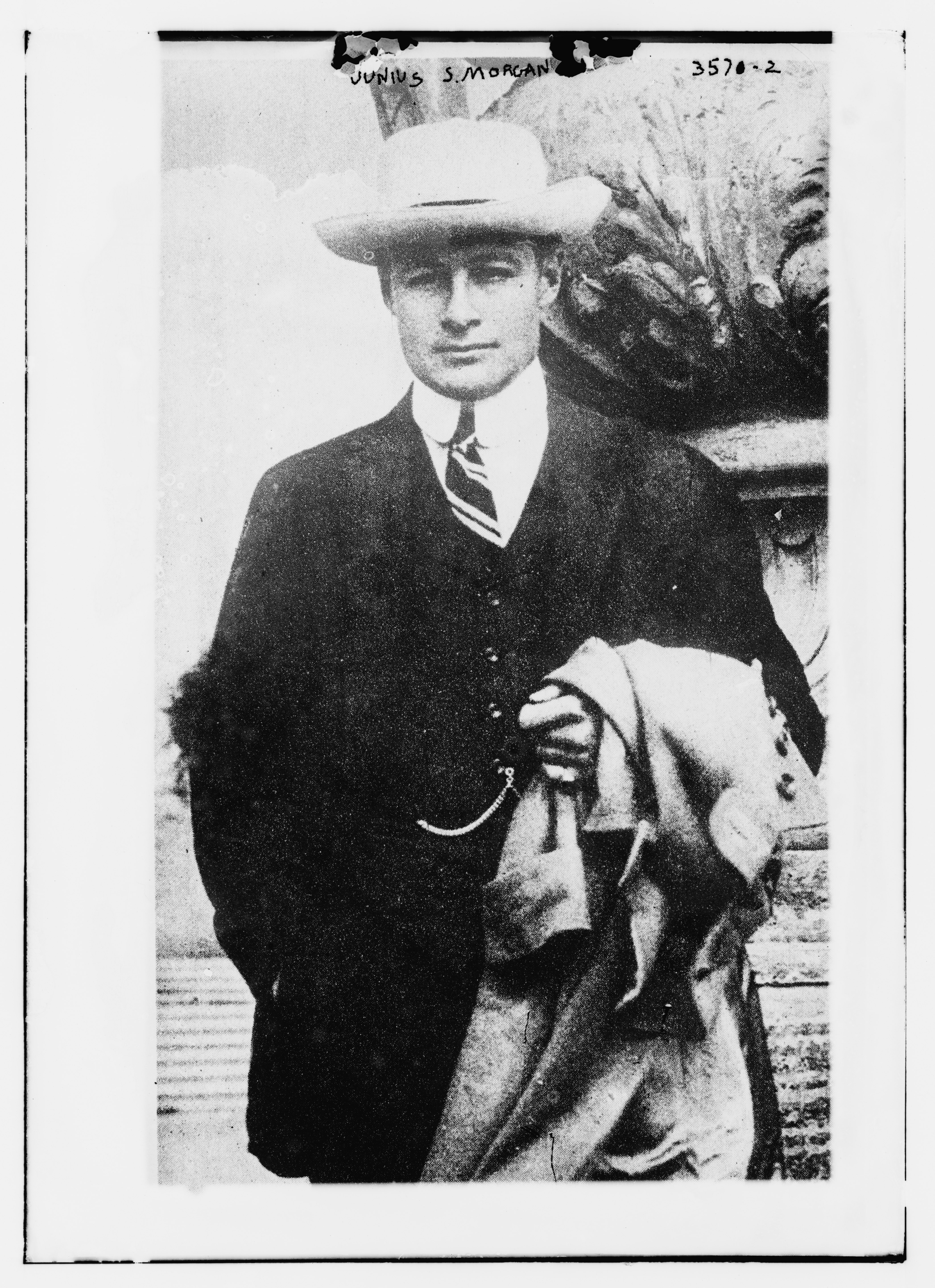
- Born: March 15, 1892; New York City, U.S.
- Died: October 19, 1960 (aged 68); Simcoe, Ontario, Canada
- Education: Harvard University
- Spouse: Louise Converse (m. 1915)
- Children: 3
- Parent(s): J. P. Morgan Jr; Jane Norton Grew
- Relatives: Morgan family

Junius Spencer Morgan III (March 15, 1892 – October 19, 1960) was an American banker and a director of the Morgan Guaranty Trust Company.

== Early life ==
Junius Spencer Morgan III was born on March 15, 1892, to Jane Norton Grew and Jack Morgan (1867–1943), who was a banker and the son of J. Pierpont Morgan (1837–1913), the renowned financier. Through his mother, he was a first cousin to Henry Grew Crosby (1898–1929).

He received an A.B. from Harvard University in 1914.

== Career ==
In 1914, after graduating from Harvard, he joined J.P. Morgan & Co., working there until 1917.

On September 15, 1917, he was commissioned an ensign in the United States Navy Reserve Force and was later promoted to lieutenant during the First World War. He resigned from the Navy on December 13, 1918. His naval service enabled him to become a member of the New York Commandery of the Naval Order of the United States.

On December 1, 1941, Morgan was placed on active duty, serving during World War II as he had remained in the Naval Reserve between the wars. On August 15, 1942, he was promoted to the rank of commander. He served with the Office of Strategic Services (OSS) and rose to the rank of captain by the end of the war. His brother, Commander Henry S. Morgan, also served with the OSS during the war.

== Personal life ==
On June 15, 1915, he married Louise Converse (b. 1894) in Boston, Massachusetts. She was the daughter of Frederick Converse, a noted composer. Together, they had three children:

- John P. Morgan II (c. 1918–2004), who married Claire Ober (1922–2008)
- Louise Morgan, who married Raymond Skinner Clark, and later Charles R. Hook Jr. (d. 1961). Her stepson, Charles R. Hook III, committed suicide in 1975.
- Ann Morgan, who married Henry Simoneau, in 1957.

Junius Morgan died on October 19, 1960. His wife survived him and later died on December 18, 1974. They are both buried at Cedar Hill Cemetery (Hartford, Connecticut), along with his father and grandfather.

=== Activities and interests ===
He served as commodore of the New York Yacht Club from 1933 to 1935. Both his father and grandfather had previously served as commodore of the club.

His family's main residence was the Salutation estate, designed by architect, Roger Bullard, which is located on Dosoris Island on Long Island in Glen Cove, New York. This home was built around 1929 for Junius Morgan and his wife. The property is no longer owned by the Morgan family, but it is still in private hands and used as a residence.

This location was used to portray the Larrabee family's mansion in the movie Sabrina. The movie made extensive use of this mansion's interiors during the filming.

== See also ==
- Morgan family
