= One of My Wives Is Missing =

1976 film by Glenn Jordan

- Genre: Thriller; Mystery
- Based on: Trap for a Single Man by Robert Thomas
- Teleplay by: Peter Stone (as Pierre Marton)
- Directed by: Glenn Jordan
- Starring: Jack Klugman; Elizabeth Ashley; James Franciscus
- Music by: Billy Goldenberg
- Country of origin: United States
- Original language: English

Production
- Executive producers: Leonard Goldberg; Aaron Spelling
- Producer: Barney Rosenzweig
- Production locations: Lake Arrowhead, San Bernardino National Forest, California; 20th Century Fox Studios - 10201 Pico Blvd., Century City, Los Angeles, California
- Cinematography: Archie R. Dalzell
- Editor: Aaron Stell
- Running time: 94 minutes
- Production company: Spelling-Goldberg Productions

Original release
- Network: ABC
- Release: March 5, 1976

One of My Wives Is Missing is a television mystery thriller (ABC, 1976) with Jack Klugman, Elizabeth Ashley, James Franciscus, Joel Fabiani, and others. The teleplay was based on the 1960 stage play Trap for a Single Man by Robert Thomas.

== Cast ==
- Jack Klugman - Inspector Levine
- Elizabeth Ashley - Elizabeth Corban
- James Franciscus - Daniel Corban
- Joel Fabiani - Father Kelleher
- Milton Selzer - Sidney Bernstein
- Ruth McDevitt - Rebecca Foster
- Garry Walberg - Officer Foley
- Tony Costello - Bert
- Byron Webster - Manager

== Production ==
The 1960 French stage play Piège Pour un Homme Seul (Trap for a Single Man) by Robert Thomas. also inspired two other TV films, Honeymoon with a Stranger (1969) and Vanishing Act (1986). It was also the basis of the Russian language film Trap for a Lonely Man (1990).
