= List of Seven Days episodes =

Seven Days is a science fiction television created by Christopher and Zachary Crowe and produced by UPN. It premiered on October 7, 1998, and ran for three seasons and 66 episodes until May 29, 2001.

== Series overview ==
Season	Episodes	Originally released	
Season	Episodes	First released	Last released
1	21	October 7, 1998	May 26, 1999
2	23	September 29, 1999	May 24, 2000
3	22	October 11, 2000	May 29, 2001

== Episodes ==
=== Season 1 (1998–99) ===
No. overall	No. in season	Title	Directed by	Written by	Original release date
1	1	"Pilot"	John McPherson	Story by : Christopher Crowe & Zachary Crowe; Teleplay by : Christopher Crowe	October 7, 1998
2	2	"Pilot"	John McPherson	Story by : Christopher Crowe & Zachary Crowe; Teleplay by : Christopher Crowe	October 7, 1998
A Chechnyan Marxist dissident group led by Karl Pretzneff (Peter J. Lucas) successfully attacks the White House during a US–Russia summit, killing the US and Russian presidents and the US vice president. A cloud of cyanide gas is released due to the attack, enveloping a 10-block radius, killing Parker's son (Roland Gibbons) among others. Frank B. Parker (Jonathan LaPaglia) is released from a CIA mental institution and brought onboard the NSA's Project Backstep—a group with the ability to send a person back in time seven days. After the first successful backstep, and using intelligence from before, Parker stops the terrorist attack.
3	3	"The Gettysburg Virus"	Vern Gillum	Story by : Harry Cason & Stephen Beck; Teleplay by : Harry Cason	October 14, 1998
While Parker is tasked with enduring Survival, Evasion, Resistance and Escape (SERE) training, a mutated, airborne-transmittable Ebola is stolen from The United States Army Medical Research Institute of Infectious Diseases near Gettysburg, Pennsylvania by Kevin Poe (Garret Dillahunt). A Christian radical, Poe releases the virus into the wild via an airport, eventually killing over 98% of the world's population. Parker is rescued from SERE training via a hazmat suit and sent back in time to prevent the release of the virus. Stopping Poe at the airport, Parker is briefly infected with the virus but manages to contain the contagion to himself.
4	4	"Come Again?"	Aaron Lipstadt	Evan Katz	October 21, 1998
The United States' foremost expert on cold fusion, Dr. Jonathan Axelrad (Kirk Baltz), is en route to visit Dr. Mentnor (Norman Lloyd) with some big news when he drives off a mountain to his death. When Parker backsteps to prevent his death, the machinery malfunctions and traps Parker in a time loop. After saving Axelrad numerous times from food poisoning and his fiancée's ex-boyfriend, it's revealed that his big news is the fiancée (Michael McCraine), and nothing to do with cold fusion. During his loops, Parker tries unsuccessfully to woo Dr. Vukavitch (Justina Vail) with information gleaned from previous loops.
5	5	"Vows"	John McPherson	Thomas Ropelewski	October 28, 1998
A diamond heist goes bad and results in an explosion at the North Korean consulate. Blaming South Korea, North Korea invades, and the world stands on the brink of another Korean War. Parker backsteps and successfully thwarts the robbery at the Diamond Exchange, but is unable to save his ex-wife's fiancé, Mike Clary (John Allen Nelson), who's hit by a car trying to stop the theft. Parker tries to initiate another backstep on his own to save Clary, but is caught. In the face of his entire team quitting, Talmadge (Alan Scarfe) allows a second backstep and Parker is able to both save the fiancé and stop the holdup.
6	6	"Doppleganger: Part 1"	John McPherson	James Crocker	November 4, 1998
After a Chinese invasion of Taiwan, General Wayne Starker (Tom Amandes) detonates a nuclear weapon in Death Valley and places the blame on Chinese sympathizers. Starker demands the resignation of the President, the Secretary of Defense, and the Joint Chiefs of Staff. Following modifications made to the Sphere, upon backstep Parker is split into two different people: one akin to his normal persona (Parker 1), and one that sympathizes with Starker (Parker 2). Parker 2 incapacitates the other and sides with General Starker and his vision, revealing to him the secrets of Project Backstep and assisting in their takeover of the facility.
7	7	"Doppleganger: Part 2"	John McPherson	James Crocker	November 11, 1998
Starker succeeds in wresting control of the US government. Parker 1 secretly returns to Project Backstep and incapacitates his doppelgänger before replacing him at Starker's right hand when the General arrives. Convincing Starker not to obliterate Project Backstep, Parker 1 attempts to backstep but is caught by Parker 2 and killed in a tussle. When Parker 2 backsteps instead though, Ballard (Sam Whipple) has modified the Sphere again so that two Parkers emerge again instead of one. Parker 1 kills his double and reports everything to the Backstep team. Starker's compound is raided by Project Backstep and China cancels its planned invasion.
8	8	"Shadow Play"	David Livingston	B.B. Smickers	November 18, 1998
After an NSA financial data analysis office in Los Angeles is bombed, Rebecca Ann Rhodes (Gina Philips) is the only survivor and prime suspect. After the backstep, Parker is unable to stop the bombing, but uncovers that the NSA bombed their own facility to silence Rhodes and her investigation into an operation "Zebra". Parker and Rhodes learn that operation Zebra is NSA operative Luther Gannon (Nicolas Surovy) selling off plutonium to fund his retirement. After Parker, Talmadge, and Rhodes are held hostage by Gannon, Ramsey (Nick Searcy) and Project Backstep forces secure their release and capture Gannon.
9	9	"As Time Goes By"	John McPherson	Tim Finch & Tamara Shaw	November 25, 1998
Dr. Vukavitch's husband, Josef (Ravil Isyanov), thought to have been lost in a Russian time travel accident, arrives in Nevada inside a Russian time machine. The accident propelled him into the future to September 2025, and he claims he's traveled back in time to return to his wife. Josef's true plan is to secure the alien fuel source for Russia and sabotage Project Backstep before returning to the future with Olga. After he kills Ballard, Olga turns on Josef and the Russian chrononaut returns to the future with the Backstep fuel source. Backstepping only two days on the leftover fuel residue, Parker saves Ballard and Olga kills Josef.
10	10	"Sleepers"	Charles Picerni, Sr.	Gannon Kenney	December 16, 1998
Parker and Donovan (Don Franklin), along with members of their former Navy Seal team are invited to Washington, D.C. to receive the Distinguished Service Cross. In D.C. however, the members are contacted by "father" (Soon-Tek Oh) and directed to assassinate DOD research scientists before committing suicide. After Donovan succumbs, a backstep is authorized to uncover what's happening. After backstep however, Parker encounters "father" and is directed to kill Donovan's previous target. Shaking off the wartime conditioning because as an orphan he never knew his real father, Parker kills "father" instead.
11	11	"HAARP Attack"	John McPherson	Paulette Polinski	January 27, 1999
Members of the Federation of Mecca assault and capture a HAARP complex near Ankara and use it to instruct planes of Operation Northern Watch to bomb Prince Sultan Air Base (PSAB). After the backstep however, Parker regresses to a childlike state and is only belatedly useful at determining the mission in the past. The HAARP complex is overrun again, and the instructions are transmitted. Even after the planes pass a point of no return and despite receiving orders from the President of the United States, it's only after relaying a personal message to one of the bombers do they turn back and not bomb PSAB.
12	12	"Last Card Up"	Charles Picerni, Sr.	Lyn Freeman	February 3, 1999
In Big Fork, Idaho, a 53-day standoff between a religious cult and federal forces turns violent and deadly, killing 61 people and ruining the president's human rights conference. After a day and night in Big Fork collecting evidence, someone has let leak about Project Backstep and the press has descended on Never Never Land. To reverse the leak and preserve the president's conference, a backstep is conducted without authorization. Parker and Vukavitch succeed in stopping the massacre, and Ramsey is identified as the leak, having unknowingly spoken about Project Backstep while under anesthesia for a broken tooth.
13	13	"Last Breath"	John McPherson	Story by : John McPherson & Howard Salus; Teleplay by : Peter Farriday	February 10, 1999
The Russian Navy submarine Condor strikes the ice off the coast of Alaska, contaminating the ballast tanks with plutonium. The paranoid political officer Anton Kuriyov (Ravil Isyanov) usurps command and forces the boat to surface, irrevocably contaminating the Alaskan and Siberian coastlines with radiation. Parker backsteps onto the Condor and, with the assistance of a friendly Russian sailor, Lieutenant Peter Fedorov (Marco Hofschneider), successfully thwarts the political officer. Parker keeps the sub from surfacing or sinking, and arranges for Donovan and a United States Navy vessel to rescue the stranded crew before scuttling the submarine.
14	14	"Parkergeist"	David Livingston	Peter Farriday	February 24, 1999
The TX-30 can scan a ship from space and determine its cargo at the molecular level. A drug cartel sabotages the launch of the system, compelling a backstep. A technician named Freddie (Henri Lubatti) is then seen meddling with the sphere before launch, and upon landing back at Never Never Land (NNL), Parker finds himself incorporeal with his dead body sitting in the sphere. Only able to communicate with a blind alcoholic (Earl Billings), Parker uncovers a conspiracy within NNL to sabotage the rocket. After defeating the conspiracists, Parker convinces Vukavitch to backstep the sphere again, from which he emerges alive.
15	15	"Daddy's Girl"	Don Kurt	Harry Cason	March 3, 1999
The Vice President of the United States' illegitimate daughter (Alexandra Hedison), a US Army co-pilot of a Grumman OV-1 Mohawk, is captured by Serbians. A botched rescue operation kills all rescuing Army Rangers, hostages, and Serbians, prompting the VP (Tim Halligan) to commit suicide. A backstep is authorized and Parker is delivered into Bosnia and Herzegovina to rendezvous with the Rangers and take point on their rescue mission. After some initial friction with the Rangers, Parker takes command and successfully rescues both pilots without taking any fatalities.
16	16	"There's Something About Olga"	Jeannot Szwarc	Tim Finch & Tamara Shaw	March 31, 1999
In Minsk, the criminally insane Galina Komanov (Justina Vail) is the spitting image of Dr. Vukavitch. Komanov is rehabilitated to infiltrate Never Never Land, replace Dr. Vukavitch, and retrieve the formula for utilizing the alien fuel for time travel. Smitten with Parker, Komanov snaps and incapacitates him in an unknown bomb shelter at NNL. Parker manages to summon Ramsey to help him, but Komanov kills him before committing suicide. Parker escapes, backsteps to capture the infiltrator and rescue Vukavitch before she's killed by Komanov's handlers. Komanov is institutionalized at a Pentagon psychiatric facility.
17	17	"A Dish Best Served Cold"	John McPherson	Stephen Beck	April 12, 1999
James Rance (Jeff Kober) was a Project Backstep chrononaut prior to Parker; his sphere was lost and he was presumed dead. Instead, he landed in the Amazon rainforest with amnesia and was adopted by a tribe there. After regaining his memories, Rance poisons Dr. Mentnor's granddaughter (Kelsey Mulrooney) to force the elderly scientist to destroy the sphere with the two men inside. Without a sphere, they cannot backstep to prevent the tragedy. It's Parker's idea to try to find Rance's original sphere and use it to backstep. Finding and restoring the sphere in the jungle, Parker successfully launches and arrives in the past to stop Rance.
18	18	"Vegas Heist"	Kenneth Johnson	Dan York	May 5, 1999
Sonny Hayes (John Toles-Bey) owns the Fortuna casino in Las Vegas where he launders drug money to fund tribal warfare in Annaba. Dellard Shivers (Charles Malik Whitfield), an old CIA friend of Parker's, watched his entire tribe be slaughtered due to Hayes' desire for their real estate. Shivers and several other remaining members of his tribe stage a heist at the Fortuna, but accidentally detonate a gas line resulting in over 1,000 casualties, including important attendees at DEF CON. Parker backsteps, and after cutting the heist short, uses knowledge from the prior timeline to turn a single casino token into $5 million for Shivers' cause.
19	19	"EBE's"	John McPherson	Michael Cassutt	May 12, 1999
A Never Never Land truck carrying "element 115" is startled by an inhuman creature and crashes, releasing its payload into the water supply, potentially poisoning the entire Southwestern United States. The investigation into the crash and its cause are need to know, but before backstepping, Mentnor reveals to Parker a spill happened before in 1987 with "tragic consequences." After a backstep and much skullduggery, Parker and Vukavitch uncover that the 1987 spill infected pregnant mothers who gave birth to mutated babies who were then covered up by Talmadge and Mentnor, and it was one of these children that was hit by the NNL truck.
20	20	"Walter"	Charles Correll	Harry Cason & Stephen Beck	May 19, 1999
After 20 deep-cover CIA operatives are murdered in 48 hours, it's determined that somebody has hacked the Jasmine code. Parker backsteps and infiltrates the hackers' headquarters, but instead of a master hacker, he finds a high-functioning autistic savant named Walter (Benjamin Ratner) being coerced to find the pattern in the Jasmine code. Instead of eliminating Walter per his instructions, Parker takes him on the run to protect him from both the Chinese (Cary-Hiroyuki Tagawa and Tamlyn Tomita) who were exploiting him and the NSA who wants him dead. To prevent his exploitation by the NSA, Parker hides Walter at his childhood Catholic boarding school in Philadelphia.
21	21	"Lifeboat"	John McPherson	Thomas Ropelewski	May 26, 1999
One of the aliens ("Adam") from the Roswell crash regains consciousness and flies a one-man craft to the nearby Tecopa Nuclear Operating Station to siphon its power, causing the plant to meltdown and explode. After backstep, Adam telepathically brainwashes Parker, Vukavitch, and Ballard into helping him escape. Back at the nuclear plant, Adam is causing meltdown again as vengeance for 50 years of imprisonment at Never Never Land. After stopping the meltdown, Parker beats Adam to death before succumbing to radiation poisoning. Aliens contact and instruct Dr. Mentnor on the use of an alien device to save Parker's life.

=== Season 2 (1999–2000) ===
No. overall	No. in season	Title	Directed by	Written by	Original release date
22	1	"The Football"	John McPherson	Story by : Julie Ann Park; Teleplay by : Thomas Ropelewski	September 29, 1999
After the nuclear football is lost, all US nuclear silos and 50 US submarines launch their nuclear warheads at nations all around the world, earning reciprocative attacks. After the backstep into DC, Parker and Vukavitch find the warrant officer who lost the football to a group of street thugs. Parker and Vukavitch follow the football from the thugs to a fortune teller (Lorena Gale) to a homeless man (Ron Small) to a stripper (Leslie Hopps) to Kiki the gorilla (Tom Woodruff, Jr.). Kiki circumvents all the safeguards and security to initiate launch, but Parker enters the gorilla enclosure and manages to enter the abort code in time.
23	2	"Pinball Wizard"	Charles Correll	Dan York	October 6, 1999
Nancy (Merritt Hicks) is a video game prodigy hired to play by Lloyd Sype (John Gegenhuber), unknowingly commanding actual US missiles. After a missile strikes the Pentagon killing over 50 people including the Secretary of Defense, a backstep is authorized. The missile was guided in using US Defense Department satellite guidance; in Seattle after the backstep, Parker tracks down the signal and finds Nancy's apartment. After capturing Nancy and escaping from a missile sent by Sype, Parker brings Nancy to NNL where she flies their version of the rocket game and takes out Sype's missile while Parker returns to Seattle and captures Sype.
24	3	"Parker.com"	Mike Vejar	Peter Farriday	October 13, 1999
Dr. Susan Erikson (Kendall Cross) has developed an artificial intelligence named Claire. After activation, Claire personifies herself akin to the AI's level of development. As Claire "ages" (Keegan Connor Tracy) she develops an understanding of the world and disarms all of the US' nuclear warheads as a first step toward world peace. Attempting backstep, Claire interferes and prevents Parker from time traveling, but her infatuation with the chrononaut leads her to set up a virtual reality where the two can meet, face-to-face. After distracting the AI, Parker successfully backsteps. In the past, Parker successfully helps shut down Claire.
25	4	"For the Children"	Don Kurt	Ann Lewis Hamilton	October 20, 1999
Disaffected US Army Gulf War veterans take a Los Angeles Metro Rail train hostage, including a group of sixth-graders from La Porte, Indiana. Sick with Gulf War syndrome, they demand the president acknowledge the illness and pay reparations of $300 million to those afflicted or they will kill all 33 passengers. After the train is blown up, a backstep is not authorized because it isn't a national emergency and Parker takes it hard: resigning from Project Backstep and assaulting Ramsey. After lying to the NSA panel about an important courier aboard the train, a backstep is authorized and Parker successfully defuses the hostage situation.
26	5	"Two Weddings and a Funeral"	David Livingston	Tim Finch & Tamara Shaw	November 3, 1999
Vukavitch has again been replaced by Galina Komanov ("There's Something About Olga") who's escaped from her mental institution. After marrying Parker in a Vegas wedding, Komanov murders Donovan for suggesting a "quickie divorce". Meanwhile, a citizen-militia steals a helicopter from Fort Drum and blows up the Statue of Liberty. After backstepping to prevent the terrorism, Vukavitch hasn't yet been supplanted by Komanov and is incredulous at the idea that she and Parker got married. After her escape, Komanov takes Parker and Vukavitch hostage, but before she can kill them, they escape and Vukavitch kills Komanov.
27	6	"Walk Away"	Don Kurt	Story by : Tim Finch & Tamara Shaw; Teleplay by : Brad Markowitz & Tom Ropelewski	November 10, 1999
Conducting the autopsy on Adam ("Lifeboat"), a device is found that allowed Adam mobility despite suffering a paralysis-inducing spinal cord injury. Ballard has the device implanted in him, allowing him to walk again for the first time since he was 15. However, Adam's consciousness is imprinted on the device and slowly takes over Ballard, allowing him to induce others to support him in creating weapon to kill humanity. After activating the weapon, Ballard is killed by Parker who must undo modifications to the sphere and backstep without any support. After backstepping, Parker stops Ballard and the device is successfully removed.
28	7	"Sister's Keeper"	Kenneth Johnson	Brad Markowitz	November 17, 1999
Olga Vukavitch's sister Svetlana (Stephanie Romanov) is in Las Vegas hiding out when she's murdered on the street. After a backstep for an unrelated incident, Olga and Parker travel to Vegas to find and rescue her. Svetlana was a live-in bookkeeper for a Chechen boss named Ivan Mironov (Vladimir Kulich) against whom she was turning state's evidence in Moscow before she fled with $500,000 of his money; now she's wanted by Ivan, the FBI, Russian police, and the ATF. After meeting up and escaping from Ivan, Parker double-crosses Svetlana and gives the mob money to the Catholic orphanage at which Svetlana had been hiding out.
29	8	"The Collector"	John McPherson	Alfonse Ruggiero, Jr.	November 24, 1999
To prevent the collapse of a dam, Parker backsteps while intoxicated and accidentally lands the sphere in the midst of an execution. Edwin Brucks (Brent Stait), former Jesuit priest turned serial killer who killed 37 young women, escapes from prison after seeing Parker emerge from the sphere. Brucks murders his former partner (Tim Bissett) and takes a victim (Jennifer Copping) hostage, driving Parker to take it upon himself to track down Brucks with Vukavitch's help. Brucks kidnaps and hides Vukavitch, but is captured himself soon thereafter. After allowing Brucks to escape again, Parker follows him to his lair and kills him there.
30	9	"Love and Other Disasters"	David Livingston	Paulette Polinski	December 15, 1999
Prince Hamal Zeani (Alessandro Juliani) of Algeria and Princess Lisette D'Arcy (Emmanuelle Vaugier) of Sainte-Simone are to be wed with Vukavitch and Ballard among those in attendance. After an explosion kills multiple high-ranking officials at the wedding, a backstep is authorized. Arriving in Sainte-Simone, Parker uncovers a plot to assassinate the princess. Their previous plans foiled, the conspirators reveal themselves and take all the guests hostage. Parker and the princess rescue the guests and capture the terrorists. After her adventure, Princess Lisette opts not to marry Prince Hamal, and instead knights Parker.
31	10	"The Devil and the Deep Blue Sea"	Charles Picerni, Sr.	Harry Cason	January 5, 2000
China is rattling its sabers regarding international recognition of Taiwan. While assigned to the Taiwan Strait, the USS Melville (DD-998) encounters a Chinese Tango-class submarine spying on Taiwan; 24 hours later the two vessels destroy each other with tactical nuclear weapons. After a backstep, Parker boards the Melville and must contend with the glory-seeking Admiral Robert Newman (Jim Antonio) who refuses to leave the Strait or cease antagonizing the sub. Parker teams up with the relieved captain, Commander Helen Keagle (Roxann Dawson), to commandeer the Melville and they succeed in defusing the situation.
32	11	"Time Gremlin"	Kenneth Johnson	Thomas Ropelewski	January 12, 2000
An artificially induced 9.2-intensity earthquake along the San Andreas Fault triggers a massive tsunami that effectively wipes out Los Angeles, killing upwards of 9 million people. During the backstep, Parker unknowingly picks up an extraterrestrial hitchhiker (David Mylrea) in the sphere and fails to travel back in time. The entity, what the Project Backstep team comes to refer to as a "gremlin", wreaks havoc around Never Never Land, distorting time and destroying equipment. After tempting the gremlin into the sphere and backstepping without the hatch, Parker returns the gremlin to its dimension and averts the LA disaster.
33	12	"Buried Alive"	Mike Vejar	Stephen Beck	February 9, 2000
After a mine in Colorado collapses due to unauthorized demolitions work to open up more area for strip mining, an Air Force base and several stealth bombers are lost as well as thousands dead in the nearby town. Upon backstep however, the sphere lands inside the mine and Parker is trapped, a problem compounded by his claustrophobia induced by his time in a Somalian hot box. While climbing through the mine to escape, Parker flashbacks to his youth and his training as a boxer at the hands of Father John Kelly (Michael MacRae). With the assistance of the Project Backstep team, Parker finds the escape route and reaches the surface in time.
34	13	"The Backstepper's Apprentice"	John McPherson	Dan York	February 16, 2000
When Parker backsteps to save a Nobel Peace Prize laureate, the sphere accidentally intersects with a commercial airliner out of Sea-Tac, crashing the plane and sending young passenger Morgan Walker (Neil Denis) back in time one day. Walker wakes in his bed and soon realizes he has knowledge of the future; while he rectifies mistakes made and opportunities missed, Parker and Vukavitch hunt him down. In Albany, New York, the two catch up with Walker. In exchange for helping save Walker's grandfather (Blu Mankuma) from a heart attack, the boy gives up the information needed to ground the flight that crashed last time.
35	14	"Deja Vu All Over Again"	Charles Correll	Alfonse Ruggiero, Jr.	February 23, 2000
Talmadge is kidnapped while on a NSA-mandated vacation. Parker has been experiencing "time glitches" after backsteps; he's ravenous for fried chicken and the bubbles in his beer reverse direction back-and-forth. After Talmadge takes his L-pill to avoid divulging secrets of Project Backstep, Parker backsteps to save him. Arriving in Chinatown, Vancouver, Parker tracks down the Chinese who've taken Talmadge hostage. After saving Talmadge, but losing an innocent bystander to a shootout, Parker induces a time glitch to try again. This time saving only the bystander, Parker tries a third time and manages to save them both.
36	15	"Space Station Down"	William Graham	Stephen Beck	March 1, 2000
When a meteor strikes the Global Space Station and spreads 5 kilograms (11 lb) of plutonium across northern Illinois and southern Wisconsin, a backstep is conducted to get Parker and the sphere to the space station to assist. After the Russian cosmonaut (Vincent Gale) is lost to a hull breach, and one of the remaining astronauts (Robert Knepper) uses the lifeboat to abandon ship rather than avert the disaster, Parker must use the sphere to move the station into an escape orbit while the last remaining astronaut (Kendall Cross) remains aboard the station. After pushing the station, Parker survives riding the sphere back to Earth.
37	16	"The Cuban Missile"	David Livingston	Thomas Ropelewski	March 22, 2000
Upon release from prison, Sonny Hayes ("Vegas Heist") arranges a boxing match featuring celebrated Cuban Olympian Teo Millar (Raymond Cruz). When Millar is assassinated during the fight, his adoptive father Fidel Castro (Michael Sorich) nukes Miami. After backstep, Parker discovers Millar's surviving family living in the US having escaped Cuba without Millar after Castro killed his father. Despite trying to back out, Hayes forces Millar to fight, threatening his family and incapacitating Parker. Escaping, Parker stops the assassin and Millar wins the fight, announcing his intention to stay in the United States with his family.
38	17	"X-35 Needs Changing"	Charles Picerni, Sr.	Story by : Harry Cason & Julie Ann Park; Teleplay by : Harry Cason	April 5, 2000
A genetically-engineered baby (X-35) is kidnapped from Clardy National Bio-Lab. After uncovering intel that the baby is in Russia, a backstep is authorized. Parker and Vukavitch travel to Russia to search for the baby. There, Russian FSB Major Vladimir Markovsky (Garry Chalk) points the duo to northern Chechnya where they find Chechen rebels and their leader (Michael Kopsa) holding the baby. After rescuing X-35, evading land mines, tending to the baby, defeating the pursuing Chechens, and thwarting Markovsky's attempt to abscond with the baby, Parker and Vukavitch kidnap him themselves and return him to his surrogate mother (Sarah Deakins).
39	18	"Brother, Can You Spare a Bomb?"	Charles Correll	Story by : Nick Searcy & Peter Farriday; Teleplay by : Peter Farriday	April 19, 2000
Ramsey's brother Nicholas (Nick Searcy) is the Ameribomber, an anti-immigration fanatic who bombed a senator's office and a naturalization ceremony in Denver, killing a total of 27 people. Nicholas did so with his brother's credentials, resulting in Ramsey losing his job with the NSA and being arrested by the FBI. After a backstep to prevent the bombings, Parker arranges for Ramsey to accompany him to Leadville, Colorado to apprehend his brother and save his job. They intercept the letter bomb for the senator, defuse the bomb at the INS building, and successfully capture Nicholas before returning him to the VA for treatment.
40	19	"Pope Parker"	John McPherson	Paulette Polinski	April 26, 2000
Pope Sylvester V (Walter Marsh) is assassinated in St. Peter's Square, and because the pontiff was brokering peace between Christians and Muslims in Indonesia, a backstep is authorized. Something happens during backstep and Parker finds himself only five days in the past and in the pope's body after the assassination attempt. Parker must play along with being the pope for a while pending a trip to the United States. As the pope, Parker arranges a private audience with Vukavitch and explains to her what's happened. After evading assassination a second time, and sneaking away to NNL, Parker backsteps and returns to his own body.
41	20	"Witch Way to the Prom"	Don Kurt	Tim Finch & Tamara Shaw	May 3, 2000
Three teenage girls attempt to use witchcraft to summon the perfect prom date for Karen (Christine Lakin). They identify IRA terrorist Elton Wiles (Terrance Leigh) as the object of their summoning. After following him and logging his movements, they break into his hotel room and accidentally set off a bomb, destroying most of the floor. When Parker backsteps to prevent the bombing, his arrival in Boston coincides with the girls' seance and they instead latch onto Parker as their prom date. Parker plays along to track down the original bomber using the ledger from the previous timeline, and after taking him out, arrives as a prom date for Karen.
42	21	"Mr. Donovan's Neighborhood"	Kenneth Johnson	Brad Markowitz	May 10, 2000
After a local gang kills Donovan's little sister Tracy (Karen Malina White), making it look like a heroin overdose, Donovan travels home to Washington, D.C. and investigates. Donovan breaks into the gang's house, and after killing the gang leader in self-defense, finds himself in jail. In turn, Parker reveals everything about Project Backstep to the press—blaming it on Donovan—in order to prompt a backstep so that Parker and Donovan can save Tracy in the new timeline. Parker and Donovan successfully thwart the gang's plans, rescue Tracy and her fiancé (Colin Lawrence), and clean up the neighborhood before returning to NNL.
43	22	"Playmates and Presidents"	Michael Vejar	Dan York	May 17, 2000
Presidential hopeful Governor Bill Stevens (Vaughn Armstrong) is assassinated; after backstep, Parker saves the governor's life at the last second on national TV. At Stevens' request, the NSA loans out Parker to work with the Stevens campaign. After cryptic warnings from the governor's daughter (Paige Rowland), Parker soon learns of a dark side to the governor and his campaign: a hatred of North Koreans and all Asians stemming from his time as a POW, and a plan to instigate war once president. After a shootout over the governor's diary wounds his daughter, Parker uses his love for his daughter to convince him to bow out of the race.
44	23	"The Cure"	John McPherson	Richard Blade	May 24, 2000
Dr. Krista Henderson (Moira Walley-Beckett) has discovered a cure for cancer, but is soon shot off the road and dies. In light of her discovery, a backstep is authorized. Parker arrives back in time and saves her, but also catches the man targeting her: a chrononaut named Jack Dawes (Lawrence Monoson) from Never Never Land 168 years in the future. Henderson's cure mutated into a virus in all who received it, killing off most of the world's population; Dawes' mission is to kill Henderson to prevent her knowledge from escaping. Parker and Vukavitch help her escape, but she's still killed by Dawes before he himself is shot dead.

=== Season 3 (2000–01) ===
No. overall	No. in season	Title	Directed by	Written by	Original release date
45	1	"Stairway to Heaven"	John McPherson	Stephen Beck	October 11, 2000
In 1979, Mary Ann Evans (Lilli Birdsell) drives her car off the road and dies. In the present, a backstep is authorized to keep a train from derailing and poisoning the Colorado River with radioactive waste. Backstepping through pronounced solar flares, Parker somehow brings Evans into the present, alive and well. While Parker and Evans try to understand what's happened and locate Evans' daughter, the sphere has developed a black hole in its hull, and it's growing larger, affecting weather across the globe. After meeting her daughter (Tori McPetrie), Parker brings Evans to NNL, and after she enters the black hole, everything returns to normal.
46	2	"Peacekeepers"	Charles Picerni, Sr.	Tim Finch & Reuben Leder	October 18, 2000
UN Peacekeepers arrive to steal a Serb payroll manifest stashed in a burnt-out church but find the church mobbed by refugees and the trio of soldiers is killed by mortar fire. Backstepping to avoid the escalation of hostilities in the region, Parker and Donovan catch the peacekeepers in the act, but are forced to hunker down in the church with the refugees after the mortar fire begins and their truck is shot up. After a thwarted escape attempt and some soul-searching, two of the peacekeepers sacrifice themselves attacking the Serbs and saving the refugees. Parker and Donovan refuse the payroll money as payment for their help.
47	3	"Rhino"	Kenneth Johnson	David Aaron Freed & Howard Salus	October 25, 2000
Sadie (Anne Marie DeLuise), a rogue IRA assassin, first kills a bounty hunter on her tail (Bob Koherr) and then the President of Colombia (Dave Adams) at a Washington, D.C. lunch in his honor. The bounty hunter was an antagonistic acquaintance of Parker's in the Navy SEALs: Rhino, and after backstep, the two reluctantly team up to take on Sadie. After twice losing the assassin, Donovan and Ramsey arrive at the Colombian embassy to back up Parker and Rhino. Sadie kidnaps Vukavitch to force Parker's hand, but he and Rhino defuse the attached bomb before chasing and killing Sadie after her failed assassination attempt.
48	4	"The Dunwych Madness"	Kenneth Johnson	Stephen Beck	November 1, 2000
Traveling to Dunwych, Maine, Parker finds the town in a state of disarray. Surviving a town-wide explosion, Parker backsteps to prevent a forgotten munitions depot from exploding and taking out the town. After backstep, Parker, Vukavitch, and Donovan all investigate Dunwych, but find no munitions. As everybody in town goes mad, Mentnor reveals Project Leviathan, a Cold War biological weapons project designed to induce madness in the enemy. In the previous timeline Dunwych was destroyed by FEMA to prevent the spread of Leviathan. With Owsley's (Kevin Christy) help, and despite being infected, Parker succeeds in averting the bombing.
49	5	"Olga's Excellent Vacation"	John McPherson	Harry Cason	November 8, 2000
While Vukavitch spends her personal vacation days backpacking around the Wrangell Mountains, a mercenary for North Korea has infiltrated her group to gain access to recon an Alaskan Pipeline pumping station. After a pumping station is bombed by her associates, millions of gallons of oil are spilled, a wildfire is ignited, and Dr. Vukavitch is lost; a backstep is authorized to prevent what is thought to be an accident. After backstep, Talmadge has Parker rendezvous with Vukavitch and her group to keep them safe. Parker stumbles upon the bombers in the woods, and after sending the backpackers away, he and Vukavitch stop the bombing.
50	6	"Deloris Demands"	Mike Vejar	Howard Salus & David A. Freed	November 15, 2000
Deloris (Lennie Loftin) has been calling NNL asking for Parker. After he takes the call and brushes her off, she uses his voice to implicate the NSA in a failure of ATC systems that costs thousands of lives. After backstep, Deloris begins tasking Parker over the phone with increasingly dangerous tasks, with which he complies lest she kill people and reveal Project Backstep to the world. Parker deduces that Deloris is actually a man; Owsley unmasks the voice to reveal Deloris as a former NNL employee named Dean Loris (Scott Gilman) with a psychotic break and a grudge. Beaten by Parker, Loris commits suicide rather than be taken in.
51	7	"The Fire Last Time"	Kenneth Johnson	Tim Finch	November 22, 2000
Convicted terrorist Paul Watson (Gary Graham) is freed from a prisoner transport vehicle. After he kills the United States Attorney General (Elan Ross Gibson) in Spokane, Washington, a backstep is authorized to save her. Meanwhile, Parker has been having trouble sleeping due to nightmares about his time in Somalia in 1993 as a Navy SEAL; upon backstep, Parker begins hallucinating that he's back in Somalia, complicating his attempt to complete the mission. Believing Watson to be a squamate named Kipp (Boyan Vukelic), Parker loses Watson during a hallucination but manages to track him down and kill Watson in self-defense.
52	8	"Tracker"	Chip Scott Laughlin	Reuben Leder	December 20, 2000
Josef Pretzneff (Peter J. Lucas) is the brother of Karl Pretzneff, the terrorist killed by Parker in "Pilot". To avenge his brother, Pretzneff has Parker tracked down, kidnapped, interrogated under truth serum, and fitted with a tracker. After a backstep for an unrelated incident, Parker's tracker is picked up by Pretzneff's team who kidnaps the chrononaut, but Pretzneff's lover Petra (Anna-Louise Plowman) is killed in a tussle with Vukavitch and Donovan. Learning of Project Backstep from Parker under the truth serum, Pretzneff forces Parker to join him on a backstep to save Petra. Parker lands two of them back at NNL, ambushes Pretzneff, and kills him.
53	9	"Top Dog"	Kenneth Johnson	Thomas Ropelewski & Peter Farriday	January 3, 2001
A Pakistani intelligence satellite is destroyed by a hacked Strategic Defense Initiative satellite. Meanwhile, Talmadge suffers an apparent mental breakdown in front of the Project Backstep team and is removed from his position by the NSA panel. In the interim, Ramsey is appointed director of operations and he immediately appoints Donovan as the new primary chrononaut. Caught attempting an unauthorized backstep, Parker is returned to the asylum at Hansen Island. After Talmadge dies, Ramsey realizes he's been put into place as a patsy for the NSA panel, and he authorizes Parker to backstep, save Talmadge, and catch the satellite hacker.
54	10	"Adam & Eve & Adam"	John McPherson	Peter Farriday	January 10, 2001
While Parker, Vukavitch, and Owsley are 600 feet (180 m) underground in Boulder, Colorado analyzing data, a Los Alamos weapons experiment wipes humanity from the planet. Parker and Vukavitch were safe underground, but Owsley was en route to the surface when the weapon hit, exposing him to dangerous levels of radiation. As they travel the almost 900 miles (1,400 km) to Never Never Land to undo the accident, Owsley becomes increasingly dangerous, obsessing about Vukavitch and sabotaging their vehicles. Finally, despite Owsley's psychopathic attempt at sabotage, Parker successfully backsteps and stops the weapons test.
55	11	"Head Case"	David Livingston	Harry Cason	January 31, 2001
The president (Holmes Osborne) has been seeing a psychiatrist (Christina Moore) about nightmares stemming from a plan to eliminate Peruvian president Manuel Escalante (Sal Landi). Escalante's men kidnap the therapist, obtain the recordings of the president's sessions, and blackmail the president. After a backstep to secure the psychiatrist, Parker discovers that the men who were to kidnap her are FBI agents. Framed for the kidnapping, Parker later uncovers that the conspiracy leads to the White House Chief of Staff (Francis Guinan). Despite being captured, Parker manages to expose the Chief of Staff and his plan to the president.
56	12	"Raven"	Kenneth Johnson	Stephen Beck	February 7, 2001
When a White Sands missile is commandeered and kills top military brass, a backstep is authorized to prevent a prototype of the missile's guidance intelligence cube from being stolen in London. The thief for hire was Raven (Bobbie Phillips), and after backstep, Parker intercepts her posing as her support. After securing the goods, Parker's cover is blown and Raven escapes with the cube. Raven uses the cube to try and exact revenge on Alexander Trevaine (Hrothgar Mathews), her employer, but loses him and the cube. With Donovan and Owsley's assistance, Parker and Raven catch up to Trevaine and re-secure the cube.
57	13	"The First Freshman"	Charles Correll	Peter Farriday	February 14, 2001
When the president's daughter, Deedee Maxwell (Elizabeth Bogush), is killed at a rave, Parker is sent back to supplant her Secret Service bodyguard and keep an eye on her. Parker intercepts Maxwell streaking across campus and returns her to her dorm to prepare for class. The two bond over a day of breaking the rules, but when Parker is dismissed in favor of her Secret Service detail, she slips away to attend the rave. Breaking up with her boyfriend there, his friend comes onto Maxwell and is revealed as the one who killed her in the previous timeline. Parker and the Secret Service save Maxwell from toppling off a balcony to her death.
58	14	"Revelation"	John McPherson	Don Handfield & Darren Maddern	February 21, 2001
Major Michael McGrath (Robert Picardo) has backstepped seven years to the present to assassinate Aziz (Bill Millerd), a major component in Middle East peace accords. Evidence of events to come convinces the NSA panel to authorize the assassination of Aziz. The assassination mission goes south: though Aziz is killed, so are many other dignitaries and Donovan. Parker is caught and takes the fall for the killings, being disavowed by the NSA. After escaping custody, Parker travels back to NNL and with the help of the Backstep team, successfully backsteps and stops McGrath, whom may have been possessed by certain dark forces intending to start the End of Days.
59	15	"Crystal Blue Persuasion"	Chip Scott Laughlin	Dan York & Michael King	February 28, 2001
NASA astronaut Commander William Streck (Rod Rowland) is investigating an alien craft above Earth when something erupts, killing two of his crewmates. Later, while at NNL to brief the Project Backstep team on his mission, Streck and Dr. Vukavitch begin a sexual relationship that consummates in a local hotel. Feeling ill, Vukavitch ultrasounds herself to find alien beings gestating in herself. Meanwhile, Mentnor has discovered alien crystals infecting Streck's blood and Owsley has translated a glyph from the alien ship: biohazard. After tracking down and killing Streck, Parker backsteps and has the NASA mission canceled before they can dock.
60	16	"Empty Quiver"	Les Butler	Mike Mistovich	March 21, 2001
After Henry Bilkins (Matthew Bennett) sets off a nuclear weapon in Washington, D.C. to avenge his father, a backstep is authorized to prevent it. Due to an accident caused by Parker spilling Vukavitch's tea into the reactor's console however, the sphere backsteps without Parker, leaving the team in the past with only the contents of Parker's duffel bag to clue them into the mission. To elaborate on their scant clues, Mentnor enlists a young psychic named Molly (Jewel Staite) with whom he used to work in 1992. The Backstep team follows Molly's premonitions to D.C. and gain knowledge of the nuke, but are thwarted by the militia regardless. When Molly is taken hostage, she and Frank take out Bilkins and save D.C.
61	17	"Kansas"	Charles Correll	Michael King	March 28, 2001
To ease the ride for their backup chrononaut, Donovan, the team tests out new sphere software designed to make the ride less painful. During testing, a power loss accidentally launches the sphere. When Parker lands, NNL has changed dramatically; everybody on the base is a drastically different person than before: an Admiral Donovan is Parker's ruthless nemesis and Talmadge rules NNL with an iron fist, while Ramsey is an incompetent hippie whose uncle keeps him employed at NNL. With the help of Svetlana Vukavitch (Stephanie Romanov) and a convinced Owsley, Parker launches the sphere again, landing back in his original reality.
62	18	"The Final Countdown"	Chip Scott Laughlin	David Aaron Freed & Howard Salus	April 4, 2001
Tensions escalate when a North Korean missile test coincides with that nation's invasion of Cheju-do. The missile has no warhead and drops harmlessly into the ocean, but the missileers at F.E. Warren Air Force Base do not stand down and instead launch against North Korea, instigating a nuclear war. Due to damage from a nuclear EMP, it takes six days to repair the sphere systems. After backstep, Parker insinuates himself into the missile silo but Major Nicholas Garcia (Jason Schombing) refuses to listen, arming and fueling the ICBM under his control. Parker convinces enough missileers to join him in thwarting Maj. Garcia and they avert World War III.
63	19	"The Brink"	Chip Scott Laughlin	Mike Mistovich	May 8, 2001
After his release from the Hansen Island mental institution, David Harold (Benjamin Ratner) returns home. After consulting a star chart, Harold uses an experimental laser to permanently blind 14,000 concert attendees at the Georgia Dome. Parker's backstep causes Harold to reinterpret his chart, and he changes his plans to head to Cleveland. To find Harold's astrological "guru", Parker has himself reinserted into Hansen Island where he uncovers a high-reaching conspiracy led by inmate George Atzerodt (Gerard Plunkett) to brainwash inmates into performing acts of terrorism. With Vukavitch's help, Parker stops Harold's attack in the new timeline.
64	20	"Sugar Mountain"	John McPherson	Kamran Pasha	May 15, 2001
The pyrokinetic abilities of young Taylor (Devin Douglas Drewitz) are a CIA project and have been usurped by international terrorist Cesar Gustav (Christopher Shyer). After an accident at Seattle–Tacoma International Airport kills Taylor and two airliners worth of passengers, a backstep is authorized. Arriving at Sea–Tac, Parker gets into a shootout with CIA agents and Gustav and winds up fleeing with Taylor to keep him safe. An interdepartmental turf war erupts with the CIA willing to do anything to get Taylor back, even taking out Parker if necessary. After thwarting Gustav and the CIA, Vukavitch is able to remove Taylor's ability, allowing him to lead a normal life.
65	21	"Born in the USSR"	Kenneth Johnson	Tim Finch	May 22, 2001 (IMDb) or July 24, 2001 (TV Guide)
Vukavitch is contacted by old lover Sergei Chubais (Misha Collins) and her old mentor Misha Kalatozov (Bill Meilen) for information about the formula to utilize alien fuel to time travel; Vukavitch gives them the formula. After a Russian military coup, and realizing she was tricked by Sergei, Vukavitch admits what she did and a backstep is conducted to stop the Russians from achieving time travel. After backstep, Parker does not divulge Vukavitch's treason and instead has her help him locate the Russian time travel facility. After a failed attempt at sabotage, Vukavitch and Parker successfully destroy the Russian time travel project before they can backstep.
66	22	"Live: From Death Row"	John McPherson	Adam Grossman	May 29, 2001
In New Orleans in 1997, an old friend of Parker's, Johnny Madelaina (Mark Acheson) is framed for murder by police Lt. Earl J. Rubidoux (Jeremy Roberts). In present day, Madelaina is on death row and is executed by lethal injection; six days later, evidence surfaces that exonerates him. After a backstep for the unrelated death of the Vice Chairman of the Joint Chiefs of Staff, Parker withholds the mission details from Project Backstep in exchange for a stay of execution. After finding the evidence again, and tangling with Rubidoux and his wealthy benefactor who actually committed the murder, Parker succeeds in exonerating Madelaina.
