= Honeymoon with a Stranger =

1969 American film

- Genre: Thriller; mystery
- Based on: Piège Pour un Homme Seul by Robert Thomas
- Written by: David P. Harmon; Henry Slesar
- Directed by: John Peyser
- Starring: Janet Leigh; Rossano Brazzi; Cesare Danova; Eric Braeden; Barbara Steele
- Music by: Mark Bucci
- Country of origin: United States
- Original language: English

Production
- Producer: Robert Jacks
- Cinematography: Rafael Pacheco
- Editor: Joe Gluck
- Running time: 74 minutes
- Production company: 20th Century Fox Television

Original release
- Network: ABC
- Release: December 23, 1969

Honeymoon with a Stranger is a 1969 American made-for-TV mystery-thriller film starring Janet Leigh, Rossano Brazzi, Cesare Danova, Eric Braeden and Barbara Steele. Directed by John Peyser and based on the play Trap for a Single Man by Robert Thomas, the film premiered as the ABC Movie of the Week on December 23, 1969.

== Plot ==
Multimillionaire Ernesto De Cardi and Sandra, his new American bride, arrive at his spacious villa in Batres, Spain, where they are welcomed by an elderly servant, Juanito. Sandra is awestruck by the scale of the villa, but they're interrupted by frequent blasting nearby to widen a mountain road. Sandra wants to be alone with Eduardo, so he allows Juanito to go home to his farm. After a night of heavy drinking, the two go to bed. His Rolls-Royce drives off in the middle of the night.

When Sandra wakes up, Ernesto is nowhere to be found. After several days, she goes to the small police department. The sergeant calls Captain Sevilla, his superior. He contacts Ernesto's attorney, Frederico, who tells him that Ernesto has a history of wooing women and leaving them after a few weeks, although Sandra is the first he has married. Frederico also promises to contact Carla, Ernesto's sister, who he says will be able to locate Ernesto.

When "Ernesto" returns to the villa, Sandra insists that he is an imposter. Ernesto says the wedding was an impulse and he regrets it. After arguing with him, Sandra wheedles an invitation to dinner with Sevilla. Afterward, he tells her that Frederico will be offering a settlement for an annulment the next day.

The sergeant implores the captain to purchase a police siren and rotating light for the department's only police car to add authority and prestige. Tired of arguing, Sevilla agrees.

Frederico offers $25,000 in exchange for the annulment, but Sandra refuses. She remembers Juanito and wants to use him to identify Ernesto as an imposter, but when Sevilla brings him in, he greets Ernesto warmly. Sevilla says Ernesto's sister, Carla, will be arriving and she can provide confirmation.

When they all meet at a cafe, Carla also greets Ernesto as if he were genuine. Sandra accuses the trio of a conspiracy. Back at the villa, they offer a new settlement, adding the villa to the money. She refuses and Frederico threatens to have her committed to a mental institution. The fake Ernesto reveals the truth, confessing that the real Ernesto once badly injured a woman and he, Antonio, is a stand-in against people who want revenge. Carla decides that she wants to keep the villa and the settlement is withdrawn.

Sevilla mulls over the case while strolling on the street at night when he spots Ernesto's Rolls-Royce. He recognizes the Spirit of Ecstasy hood ornament on it. The sergeant had been fidgeting with a loose one, found and turned in by a construction worker.

The trio offer Sandra a new agreement, but Sandra still refuses and tears up the contract. Antonio threatens Sandra with a lit cigarillo when she suddenly bursts out laughing. She knows the settlement is worthless because she killed Ernesto. She explains that she studied Ernesto for a year, learning all about him, including how he left women. She played hard to get, which attracted him. The night he disappeared, she had drugged Ernesto's champagne. She put him in the Rolls-Royce, drove to a mountain road and pushed it over the edge. She planned for it to explode in the gully so Ernesto's death would look like he was driving drunk, but it sank into the dirt and was covered by demolition debris from the road construction. She didn't know about Antonio but took advantage of the trio's masquerade, knowing their ploy made her more believable and could unintentionally incriminate them in his murder if they tried to report her, and that she had an ally by making Sevilla fall in love with her. She demands a million dollars. They reluctantly agree.

Sevilla rushes to the villa and says he has broken the case. He believes the loose hood ornament is proof that there were two different Rolls-Royce cars, thus two Ernestos. He intends to start a search at the demolition site the next day to find the real Ernesto's body. Afraid that he might unravel her plan, Sandra offers him the drugged champagne. After he blacks out, she puts him in his police car and prepares to send him over the cliff as well. A wheel gets stuck on a rock and as she tries to move the rock, a groggy Sevilla turns on the new siren. The sergeant hears it from the town and follows the sound. Sevilla wakes up and they confront her at the edge of the road. She has a nervous breakdown, but he coaxes her back from the edge and drives her back to town in custody.

== Cast ==
- Janet Leigh as Sandra Latham
- Rossano Brazzi as Captain Sevilla
- Joseph Lenzi as Ernesto #1
- Cesare Danova as Ernesto #2
- Juan Elices as Juanito
- Eric Braeden as Frederico Caprio
- Barbara Steele as Carla
- Sancho Gracia as Sergeant

== Production ==
The teleplay was based on the 1960 French stage play Piège Pour un Homme Seul (Trap for a Single Man) by Robert Thomas. The play also inspired two other TV films, One of My Wives Is Missing (1976) and Vanishing Act (1986). It was also the basis of the Russian language film Trap for a Lonely Man (1990).
