= Maria Papapetros =

- Born: July 20, 1943 (age 83); Heraklion, Crete, Greece
- Occupations: Author, psychic
- Years active: 1974–present
- Website: www.mpapapetros.com

Maria Papapetros (Greek: Μαρία Παπαπέτρος) is a Greek psychic and spiritual healer. She has served as spiritual consultant to individuals within the entertainment industry, as well as law enforcement agencies, world leaders, and major financial institutions. She has been involved in making the field of parapsychology mainstream. Papapetros acted as a psychic consultant on the Demi Moore films The Butcher's Wife and Ghost, receiving an on-screen credit for the former.

== Early life ==
Maria Papapetros was born on July 20, 1943, in Heraklion, Crete, Greece to Chrysa and Vasillios Petropoulos, both Anatolian immigrants of Greek descent. Her father was born in Istanbul in 1895 and her mother in 1912 in Izmir, Turkey.

== In the media ==
Papapetros has been a guest on many national television programs, including Late Night with David Letterman, Donnie & Marie, The Maury Povich Show, Entertainment Tonight, Inside Edition and E! Entertainment Television and Fox News. She has also appeared in periodicals such as Vogue, Redbook, Elle, Marie Claire, Glamour and Ellopia Press Magazine USA.

In January 2011, Papapetros partnered with Lifetime Television and their Year Of You promotion, where readers of The Cosmic Lowdown blog could enter for a chance to win a private psychic reading with Papapetros.

== Ties to law enforcement ==
In 1978, Papapetros spoke to law-enforcement officials about the Jim Jones mass-suicide case in Guyana. Papapetros also worked with many of the defectors and survivors at the Human Freedom Foundation, which was set up to help former members of the cult deprogram themselves.

From 1978 to 1979, she was brought in as a psychic consultant on the Hillside Strangler murders in Los Angeles. In 1992, she consulted with the Sheriff's Office in Harris County, Texas regarding Rex Warren Mays, who was later convicted of killing two girls and was subsequently executed in 2002.

== Ties to Hollywood ==
Having worked with numerous celebrities, producers and actors, Papapetros has earned the popular nickname, "Psychic to the Stars". In addition to supporting various film and television projects, Papapetros has acted as a psychic consultant on two of Demi Moore’s films, The Butcher's Wife and Ghost. For The Butcher's Wife, she was the first person to receive on-screen credit for an off-screen role as a "psychic consultant." In addition to Moore, the film’s producer and director were both clients of Papapetros at the time.

== Contributions to parapsychology ==
In 1980, Papapetros participated in one of the first controlled studies of parapsychology, conducted by Jan Berlin at UCLA's Department of Psychology.
