= George Dzundza =

American actor (born 1945)

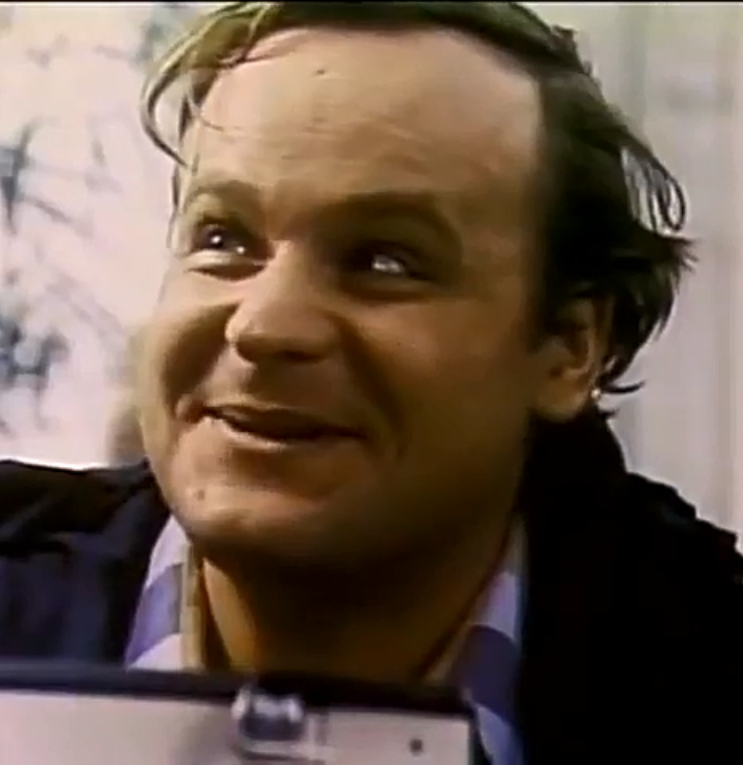
- George Dzundza in The Streets of San Francisco, 1977
- Born: July 19, 1945 (age 81); Rosenheim, Bavaria, Allied-occupied Germany
- Education: St. John's University
- Occupation: Actor
- Years active: 1973–2011
- Spouse: Mary Jo Vermeulen (m. 1982)
- Children: 3

George Dzundza (/ˈzʊndzə/ ZUUND-zə; born July 19, 1945) is an American retired actor. He is known for his varied work in film and on television, including The Deer Hunter (1978), Skokie (1981), No Way Out (1987), The Beast (1988), Impulse (1990), White Hunter Black Heart (1990), The Butcher's Wife (1991), Basic Instinct (1992), Crimson Tide (1995), Dangerous Minds (1995), and City by the Sea (2002).

Dzundza's television roles include Sergeant Max Greevey on the first season of Law & Order (1990–91), Tom Grzelack on Hack (2002–03), Harold O'Malley on Grey's Anatomy (2005–2007), and the voices of Arnold Wesker/The Ventriloquist and Perry White in the DC Animated Universe. He also starred on the short-lived sitcom Open All Night (1981). Along with the ensemble cast, Dzundza won the Volpi Cup for Best Actor for his performance in the Robert Altman film Streamers (1983). Dzundza also appeared on one episode of Matlock.

== Early life and education ==
Dzundza was born in Rosenheim, Germany, shortly after the end of World War II, to Ukrainian father Roman Dzundza and Polish mother Maria Humenecka. His father was from Kalush and mother from Lviv, both in what is now Ukraine. Each had been conscripted into forced labor by the Nazi regime. Dzundza spent his early years living in displaced persons camps with them.

Dzundza's family moved to Amsterdam in 1949, then to the US in 1956, eventually settling on the Lower East Side of Manhattan in New York City. He became a naturalized US citizen. He attended Xavier High School and St. Johns University, and studied theatre under Stella Adler and Harold Clurman.

== Career ==
Dzundza began acting in his freshman year of college at the insistence of another student. However, his professional stage debut was in a 1973 New York Shakespeare Festival production of King Lear, which was later aired as an episode of Great Performances. He starred in the Festival's 1973-74 national tour of That Championship Season. He also starred in the Broadway productions The Ritz and Legend, and in A Prayer for My Daughter at the Public Theatre. In 1979 he played the role of Cully Sawyer in the horror film, Salem's Lot.

Dzundza starred in a short-lived 1981 sitcom series Open All Night, about the owner of a "Store 364" convenience store in Inglewood, California. He portrayed American Nazi leader Frank Collin in the 1981 television film Skokie. In 1983, he starred in Robert Altman's film Streamers, based on the David Rabe play of the same name. The film's ensemble cast collectively won the Best Actor Award at the 40th Venice International Film Festival.

In 1987, Dzundza played Sam Hesselman, a disabled man in a wheelchair, in No Way Out and Commander Daskal in The Beast in 1988. Other major film roles of his include The Deer Hunter, Impulse, White Hunter Black Heart, The Butcher's Wife, Basic Instinct, Crimson Tide, Dangerous Minds and City by the Sea.

He was an original cast member of the NBC drama Law & Order, playing NYPD Sergeant Max Greevey in the first season only. Dzundza left after the first season of the show.

His other acting work includes an appearance on The Waltons (1975), and playing the Archie Bunker-like father in the short-lived Christina Applegate sitcom Jesse. He voiced supervillain the Ventriloquist in Batman: The Animated Series, and Perry White in Superman: The Animated Series.

In 2005, he played Anubis (aka "Jim") in the Stargate SG-1 episode "Threads". Dzundza portrayed George O'Malley's father Harold on Grey's Anatomy.

== Personal life ==
Dzundza has been married to Mary Jo Vermeulen since 1982. They have three daughters and two grandchildren.

Now semi-retired, Dzundza resides in Astoria, Oregon, where he directs community and regional theatre productions.

== Filmography ==
=== Film ===
Year	Title	Role	Notes
1973	Massage Parlor Murders	Mr. Creepy	Also assistant director
1974	Fischia Il Sesso	Dean	
1975	The Happy Hooker	Chet	
1978	The Deer Hunter	John Welsh	
1981	Honky Tonk Freeway	Eugene	
1983	Streamers	Cokes	
1984	Best Defense	Steve Loparino	
1986	No Mercy	Captain Stemkowski	
1987	No Way Out	Sam Hesselman	
1987	No Man's Land	Uncle Mike	Uncredited
1988	The Beast	Daskal	
1988	Honor Bound	Wocjinski	
1990	Impulse	Lt. Joe Morgan	
1990	White Hunter Black Heart	Paul Landers	
1991	The Butcher's Wife	Leo Lemke	
1992	Basic Instinct	Detective Gus Moran	
1995	Crimson Tide	COB Walters	
1995	Dangerous Minds	Hal Griffith	
1997	That Darn Cat	Boetticher	
1997	Do Me A Favor	Wallace Muller	
1998	Batman & Mr. Freeze: SubZero	Dr. Gregory Belson (voice)	Direct-to-video
1998	Species II	Colonel Carter Burgess Jr.	
1999	Instinct	Dr. John Murray	
2000	Above Suspicion	Stamos	
2002	Determination of Death	Mac	
2002	City by the Sea	Reg Duffy	
2005	National Lampoon's Adam & Eve	Eve's dad	
2006	Superman: Brainiac Attacks	Perry White (voice)	Direct-to-video
2010	The Chosen One	Norman	

=== Television ===
Year	Title	Role	Notes
1974	Kung Fu	Mr. Evans / 1st John	Episode: "Night of the Owls, Day of the Doves"
1974	Great Performances	Gentleman	Episode: "King Lear"
1975	Movin' On	Charlie Banner	Episode: "From Baltimore to Eternity"
1975	Starsky & Hutch	Crandell	Episode: "Snowstorm"
1975	The Waltons	A.J. Covington	Episode: "The Abdication"
1975	Grady	George Kosinski	3 episodes
1975	Joe Forrester		Episode: "The Best Laid Schemes"
1976	Bert D'Angelo/Superstar	Mike Zuber	Episode: "Murder in Velvet"
1977	The Streets of San Francisco	Paul Weber	Episode: "The Canine Collar"
1978	The Defection of Simas Kudirka	Gruzauskas	Television film
1979	Salem's Lot	Cully Sawyer	Miniseries
1979–1980	Young Maverick	Clem	2 episodes
1981	Skokie	Frank Collin	Television film
1981	A Long Way Home	Floyd Booth	Television film
1981–1982	Open All Night	Gordon Feester	13 episodes
1983	The Face of Rage	Nick	Television film
1983	Faerie Tale Theatre	The Woodsman	Episode: "Sleeping Beauty"
1984	The Lost Honor of Kathryn Beck	Lt. DeCarlo	Television film
1984	When She Says No	Paul Fellows	Television film
1984, 1988	CBS Schoolbreak Special	Mr. Elder / Arthur Jennings	2 episodes
1985	The Rape of Richard Beck	Blastig	Television film
1985	Brotherly Love	Lieutenant Conde	Television film
1985	The Execution of Raymond Graham	Prison Chaplain	Television film
1986	The Disney Sunday Movie	Pete Selzer	Episode: "2 1/2 Dad"
1986	The Twilight Zone	Colonel Ilyanov	Episode: "Red Snow"
1986	One Police Plaza	Detective Gustav Stamm	Television film
1987	Crime Story	Ivan Ivanovitch Patchenko	Episode: "Mig 21"
1987	Glory Years	John Moss	Television film
1988	Something Is Out There	Frank Dileo	2 episodes
1989	Terror on Highway 91	Sheriff Jessie Barton	Television film
1989	The Ryan White Story	Dr. Kleiman	Television film
1989	Cross of Fire	Boyd Gurley	Miniseries
1990–91	Law & Order	Sergeant Max Greevey	Main cast (22 episodes)
1992	What She Doesn't Know	Jack Kilcoin	Television film
1993–95	Batman: The Animated Series	Arnold Wesker/The Ventriloquist, G. Carl Francis, Chubb (voices)	6 episodes
1993	The Untouchables	Warden Wyandotte	3 episodes
1993	Animaniacs	Ivan Bloski (voice)	Episode: "Plane Pals"
1994	The Babymaker: The Dr. Cecil Jacobson Story	Cecil Jacobson	Television film
1994	Matlock	Michael Brennan	Episode: "Brennan"
1994	The Enemy Within	Jake	Television film
1996	The Limbic Region	Lloyd	Television film
1996	Road Rovers	Gustav Hovac (voice)	Episode: "Where Rovers Dare"
1996–99	Superman: The Animated Series	Perry White (voice)	10 episodes
1997	The New Batman Adventures	Arnold Wesker/The Ventriloquist (voice)	Episode: "Double Talk"
1998–99	Jesse	John Warner Sr.	Main cast (22 episodes)
2000	Touched by an Angel	Bud Baxter	Episode: "The Empty Chair"
2000	Third Watch	Faith's Dad	Episode: "Know Thyself"
2002	The Agency	Helmut	Episode: "The Gauntlet"
2002–03	Hack	Tom Grzelak	Main cast (22 episodes)
2005	Stargate SG-1	Jim/Anubis	Episode: "Threads"
2005–07	Grey's Anatomy	Harold O'Malley	7 episodes
2006	The Grim Adventures of Billy & Mandy	Coach (voice)	Episode: "The Secret Snake Club vs. P.E."
2008	October Road	Gloy Daniels	Episode: "Hat? No Hat?"
2009	The Beast	Lieutenant Platko	Episode: "Two Choices"
2011	Danni Lowinski	Augustus 'Gus' Lowinski	Television film

=== Video games ===
Year	Title	Voice role	Notes
2002	Superman: Shadow of Apokolips	Perry White	
2004	Shellshock: Nam '67	Platt	
2009	Batman: Arkham Asylum	Blackgate Thug	Uncredited

== Stage appearances ==
Year	Title	Role	Venue	Notes
1973	King Lear	Gentleman	Delacorte Theater, Off-Broadway	For Shakespeare in the Park
1973	That Championship Season	George Sikowski	U.S. tour	For Shakespeare in the Park
1974	Mert and Phil	Dream Man	Vivian Beaumont Theater, Broadway	
1975–76	The Ritz	Abe	Longacre Theatre, Broadway	
1976	A Streetcar Named Desire		McCarter Theatre, Princeton	
1976	Legend	William F. P. Morgan	Ethel Barrymore Theatre, Broadway	
1977	As To The Meaning of Words		Hartman Theatre, Stamford	
1977	A Prayer for My Daughter	Kelly	Public Theater, Off-Broadway	
1999	Measure for Measure	Pompey	Ahmanson Theatre, Los Angeles	

== Awards and nominations ==
Institution	Year	Category	Work	Result
Gold Derby Awards	2007	Drama Guest Actor	Grey's Anatomy	Won
Gold Derby Awards	2010	Drama Guest Actor of the Decade	Grey's Anatomy	Nominated
Venice Film Festival	1983	Best Actor	Streamers	Won (Note: Shared with Guy Boyd, David Alan Grier, Mitchell Lichtenstein, Matthew Modine, and Michael Wright.)
