= Seven Days (TV series) =

Science fiction television series based on the premise of limited time travel

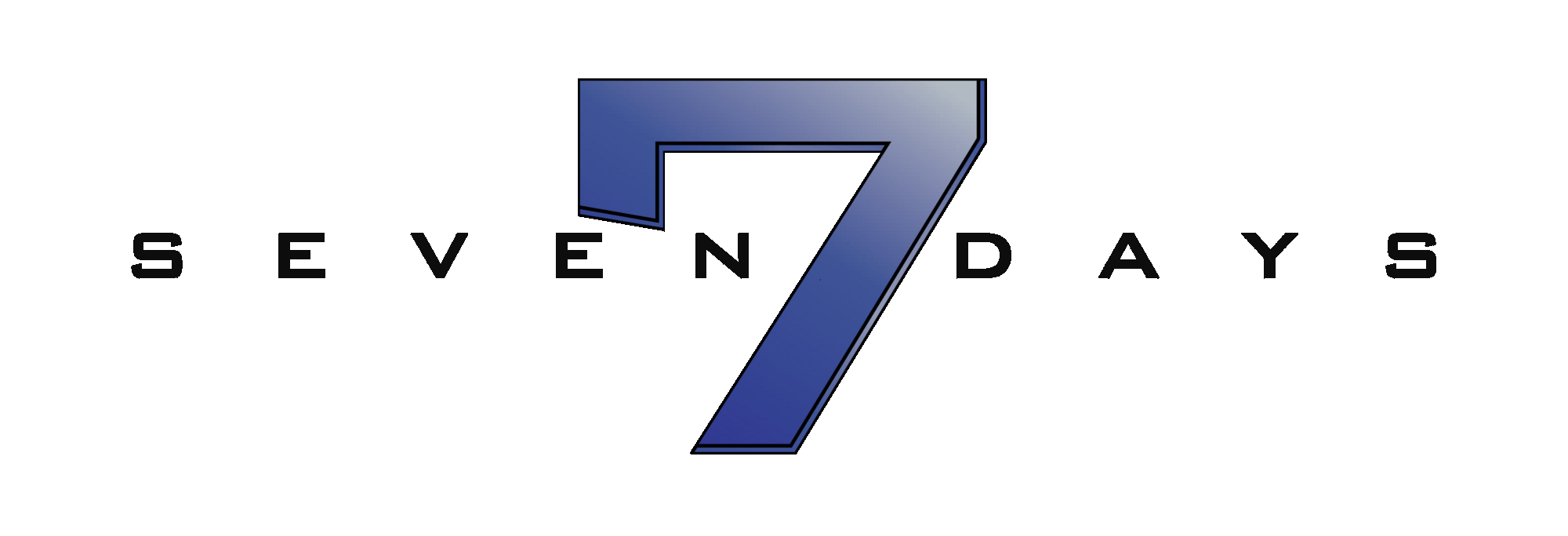
- Also known as: 7 Days
- Genre: Science fiction; Drama; Crime thriller; Political thriller
- Created by: Christopher Crowe; Zachary Crowe
- Starring: Jonathan LaPaglia; Don Franklin; Norman Lloyd; Justina Vail; Nick Searcy; Sam Whipple; Alan Scarfe; Kevin Christy
- Composer: Scott Gilman
- Country of origin: United States
- No. of seasons: 3
- No. of episodes: 66 (list of episodes)

Production
- Production locations: United States; Canada
- Running time: 42 minutes
- Production companies: Crowe Entertainment; Paramount Television

Original release
- Network: UPN
- Release: October 7, 1998 – May 29, 2001

Seven Days is an American science fiction television series centered around time travel. It was created by Christopher and Zachary Crowe, and aired on UPN from October 7, 1998 to May 29, 2001.

== Synopsis ==
The plot follows Frank B. Parker, a former Navy SEAL and CIA operative who was drafted as a member of "Project Backstep", a secret black-ops branch of the US National Security Agency stationed in a base located somewhere in the Nevada desert called "Never Never Land" (a play on Area 51, or Groom Lake Flight Test Facilities, also known as "Dreamland") responding specifically to national security issues that would otherwise endanger the safety of the USA and the world at large, utilizing the "Chronosphere"—an experimental time machine reverse-engineered from alien technology found at Roswell years ago—to avert disasters before they begin.

=== The Chronosphere ===
The "Chronosphere", otherwise classified as the "Backstep Sphere" or simply "the Sphere", is a blue-colored 16-sided chamfered dodecahedron time machine with a detachable vacuum-sealed entry hatch. As each episode's introduction implies, the Chronosphere is designed to send "one human being back in time seven days" to avert disasters, referred to as a "backstep". The show's title refers to the chief limitation of the technology, namely that a "chrononaut" can only backstep seven days due to limitations imposed by the device's fuel source—a transuranic alien substance salvaged from the Roswell crash site known as "Element-115"—and its external reactor outside of its hangar. As the fuel source is limited, there is a strict mandate that the backstep is confined to events relating directly to national security, though it can replenish itself to a sufficient amount seven days after its usage.

When sufficiently charged, to 100%, the Chronosphere's reactor, the gravitational field generators located outside the Chronosphere and Element-115 itself create a time-displacement field around the device before seemingly vanishes from existence in a bright flash of light as it slingshots into a wormhole in space where the time-bending properties of space itself works in tandem with the time-displacement field to send the Chronosphere and its contents backward in time and into Earth as it crashes down for landing. In the process, past iterations of the Chronosphere and its contents fade from existence to prevent further paradoxes as if it was never there, stating that "two instances of the same object cannot occupy the same space".

While it is accurate in traveling through time, navigating the Chronosphere to its destination seven days into the past requires having to use the navigation joystick to maintain and center the Sphere's six gravitational axes (referred to as "flying the needles") as "backstepping" has often proven to be agonizingly painful on a physical and psychological level during its transit, sometimes leading to fatal worst-case scenarios should the chrononaut prematurely let go of the joystick before the transit is complete such as being stuck in space or phased into the ground.

However, being a reverse-engineered experimental tech based on alien technology, the Chronosphere tends to suffer from a variety of malfunctions, either due to the unpredictable properties of Element-115 or the untested nature of the device itself, as the recurring element of the show has Parker and/or Project Backstep having to prevent any given crisis under the limitations of the Sphere's unpredictable effects, ranging from causing time loops (one of which is in the vein of Run Lola Run), intercepting a soul on its way to the afterlife that results in the Chronosphere creating a black hole in its hull, reverting one's mind to a child-like state, being stuck in the body of a Pope, separating one's soul from its body, transporting into a parallel universe, and splitting the chrononaut into two opposing halves, among many others.

== Cast ==
- U.S. Navy Commander Francis "Frank" Bartholomew Parker (Jonathan LaPaglia), a former Navy SEAL and ex-CIA operative recruited by the program to be the project's "chrononaut". While having served with distinction, he is not the program's initial choice due to a history of emotional instability stemming from an extended period of torture while being held prisoner in Somalia; however, Donovan vouches for Frank, and facilitates his release from a secret mental health facility for troubled operatives with classified knowledge. Frank's testing reveals that in addition to the determination and physical stamina necessary to succeed as a Navy SEAL, he has an exceptionally high pain tolerance, a photographic memory, and a capacity for unorthodox problem-solving. In addition to his military service, several plot elements focus on his troubled youth in Philadelphia, his attempts to reconcile relationships with his ex-wife and estranged son, and his attempts to use time travel for personal gain. The latter is often played for comedic effect as a series of running gags where his future knowledge of sports betting is rendered defunct due to changes in the timeline, and his romantic pursuit of Dr. Vukavitch succeed only to be undone when he travels through time. Throughout the series, he also clashes with the project's head of security, Nathan Ramsey, due to the restrictive nature of his service with the program. His codename in the field is "Conundrum."
- Dr. Olga Vukavitch (Justina Vail), a Russian doctor who worked in the Russian version of the Backstep Project, which, without any technology from the Roswell crash, never reached operational level. She lost her husband in an accident. She grows to like Frank (whom she addresses formally) at times, but is almost invariably put off by some new show of his crassness or arrogance (although Frank often manages to overcome this, only to have to Backstep). Despite this, many episodes reveal that she has a hidden affection for Frank, and she always thinks of him shortly before she dies in a previous timeline.
- U.S. Navy Captain Craig Donovan (Don Franklin), Navy SEAL and Project Backstep's military advisor/tactical coordinator and backup chrononaut. He is an old friend of Frank's from the SEAL teams, who led the operation to rescue him in Mogadishu. As a Chrononaut candidate, Donovan was an early lead during the testing phase, due to his excellent hand-eye coordination, physical conditioning, and psychological stability. Compared with Frank, the scientists believed that Donovan would be the better overall pilot for the chronosphere, and that his coordination would ensure less risk to the equipment; however, Talmadge eventually selects Frank due to the advantages of his pain tolerance and photographic memory, though Donovan never begrudges this and is Frank's strongest supporter. In spite of his 'backup' status, the series never depicts him taking Frank's place. He has, on occasion, assumed command of the project, its security forces, and the scientific branch during the end-of-the world situations that frequently precede a backstep as project leaders were killed or incapacitated. He is well-liked and respected by the scientific, security, and military staff and was Ramsey's preferred choice.
- Dr. Bradley Talmadge (Alan Scarfe), director of the Backstep Project operations and a long-time member of the NSA intelligence community. Although middle-aged, he is shown several times to still have excellent combat skills.
- NSA Agent Nathan Ramsey (Nick Searcy), Backstep Project security chief. A short-tempered, highly opinionated man, he opposes Frank becoming chrononaut and is therefore made the prime target of Parker's practical jokes. Ramsey is portrayed to be conservative, and he always makes politically incorrect statements supporting the use of force to quickly end problems (but the way he puts it is always funny instead of malicious). Ramsey's area of expertise is intelligence and counter-intelligence. His job is to use the information that Frank Parker gives him to avert disasters, but Frank commonly fulfills the missions himself. Ramsey is also the man the NSA sends out to retrieve Frank when the Ex-Seal makes unscheduled disappearances from the base.
- Dr. Isaac Mentnor (Norman Lloyd) (seasons 1–2, guest appearances in season 3), a scientist with a shadowy past that's tied into the Roswell cover-up, Dr. Mentnor was the man who initially conceived the Backstep project.
- Dr. John Ballard (Sam Whipple) (seasons 1–2). The wheelchair-using resident genius on the Backstep Project. Ballard is responsible for calibrating and maintaining the Spheres and keeping them active to allow for a quick Backstep if needed.
- Andrew "Hooter" Owsley (Kevin Christy) (season 3). A young physics prodigy whom Ballard suggested as his replacement. He works with Dr. Mentnor to enhance the existing Backstep technology and has been shown occasionally to have a secret crush on Olga.

== Production ==
Three seasons of Seven Days were produced. All three seasons have been shown in North America, and by the BBC in the United Kingdom.

Seven Days was based on an idea from Kerry McCluggage, then-president of Paramount Television. He pitched the idea to Christopher Crowe, who mixed it with his own research on Area 51 to create the series. The show was not well-received by reviewers, who criticized the show's "flimsy" premise and violence.

Original cast member Sam Whipple, who played Dr. John Ballard, left the series four episodes into the third season, due to a diagnosis of cancer that was eventually fatal. He was replaced by Kevin Christy as Andrew "Hooter" Owsley for the rest of the season.

Justina Vail, who played Dr. Olga Vukavitch, quit the series before the end of the third season, though she agreed to film a few extra scenes to wrap up her character's arc. Her departure and the tensions within the cast, as well as the show's low ratings, played a role in UPN's decision not to renew the series for a fourth season. Vail's final episode was the series' penultimate episode, "Born in the USSR" although she was seen as usual in the title sequence from the final episode, "Live: From Death Row".

== Episodes ==
Season	Episodes	Originally released	
Season	Episodes	First released	Last released
1	21	October 7, 1998	May 26, 1999
2	23	September 29, 1999	May 24, 2000
3	22	October 11, 2000	May 29, 2001

== DVD release ==
On November 26, 2018, Visual Entertainment released the complete series on DVD in Region 1 for the first time.

== Awards ==
Seven Days was nominated for six awards, winning one. Actress Justina Vail won a Saturn Award in 2000 for her performance on the show.

Year	Award	Organization	Category	Nominee	Result	Ref.
1998	ADG Excellence in Production Design Award	Art Directors Guild	Excellence in Production Design for a Television Series	Carol Winstead Wood, Eric Orbom, Gregory A. Weimerskirch, Beala Neel	Nominated	
1999	Saturn Award	Academy of Science Fiction, Fantasy and Horror Films	Best Genre Network Series	Production team	Nominated	
1999	Saturn Award	Academy of Science Fiction, Fantasy and Horror Films	Best Genre TV Actor	Jonathan LaPaglia	Nominated	
2000	Saturn Award	Academy of Science Fiction, Fantasy and Horror Films	Best Genre TV Supporting Actress	Justina Vail	Won	
2000	Saturn Award	Academy of Science Fiction, Fantasy and Horror Films	Best Network Television Series	Production team	Nominated	
2001	Golden Reel Award	Motion Picture Sound Editors	Best Sound Editing - Television Episodic - Effects & Foley; Episode: "Tracker"	Wilson Dyer, Kevin Fisher, Jay Keiser, Todd Niesen	Nominated	
