= Naked Souls =

1996 film

- Region 2 DVD cover
- Directed by: Lyndon Chubbuck
- Written by: Frank Dietz
- Produced by: Ivana Chubbuck; Lyndon Chubbuck
- Starring: Pamela Anderson; Brian Krause; Clayton Rohner; Justina Vail; David Warner; Dean Stockwell
- Cinematography: Eric J. Goldstein
- Edited by: Rebecca Ross
- Music by: Nigel Holton
- Production companies: Mr. E Productions Inc. Vanguard Entertainment; Warner Vision Films
- Distributed by: Warner Vision Entertainment
- Release date: May 18, 1996
- Running time: 85 minutes
- Country: United States
- Language: English
- Budget: $7 million

Naked Souls is a 1996 American erotic thriller film starring Brian Krause and Pamela Anderson. It was written by Frank Dietz and directed by Lyndon Chubbuck.

While Pamela Anderson plays only a small role in the plot, much of the advertising and even the film' tagline ("She's about to bare her soul... and all that goes with it") is focused on her.

Anderson was said to have performed in full frontal nudity only in the unedited video version.

== Plot ==
Edward, a scientist doing research in an attempt to read and record people's thoughts, has a relationship with his artist girlfriend Britt. The extensive time he puts into his research leaves him little time for his relationship with Britt. Just as Edward is about to give up on his research, he is contacted by the mysterious Everett Longstreet who offers Edward both a place to do his research and unlimited funding. As Edward gets closer to making a breakthrough with his research he becomes suspicious of Everett and his ulterior motives as he realizes that he is getting closer to not only unlocking the mind but also the secrets of eternal life.

== Cast ==
- Brian Krause as Edward
- Pamela Anderson as Britt
- David Warner as Everett Longstreet
- Dean Stockwell as Duncan
- Clayton Rohner as Jerry
- Justina Vail as Amelia
- Michael Papajohn as Driver
