= 3 (The X-Files) =

- The X-Files episode
- Episode no.: Season 2 Episode 7
- Directed by: David Nutter
- Written by: Chris Ruppenthal; Glen Morgan; James Wong
- Production code: 2X07
- Original air date: November 4, 1994
- Running time: 45 minutes

Guest appearances
- Justina Vail as The Unholy Spirit; Perrey Reeves as Kristen Kilar; Gustavo Moreno as The Father; Frank Military as The Son/John

Episode chronology
← Previous "Ascension"	Next → "One Breath"
- The X-Files season 2

"3" is the seventh episode of the second season of the American science fiction television series The X-Files. First broadcast on the Fox network on November 4, 1994, the episode was written by Glen Morgan, James Wong and Chris Ruppenthal, directed by David Nutter, and featured guest appearances by Perrey Reeves and Malcolm Stewart.

The episode is a "Monster-of-the-Week" story, unconnected to the series' wider mythology. Following on from the abduction of Dana Scully in the previous episode, "Ascension", "3" was the first episode of The X-Files not to feature series star Gillian Anderson. The episode was viewed by 9 million households during its first broadcast, and received negative reviews from both critics and the show's cast and crew.

The show centers on FBI agents Fox Mulder (David Duchovny) and Dana Scully (Gillian Anderson) who work on cases linked to the paranormal, called X-files. In the episode, Mulder is brought in to investigate a series of ritualistic murders in Los Angeles, which he initially believes were the work of a cult. However, it turns out that the perpetrators are a group of vampires.

== Plot ==
In Los Angeles, Garrett Lorre, a middle-aged businessman, embarks on a one night stand with an anonymous woman he has met at a corporate party. As they are having sex in his hot tub, the woman bites Lorre to drink his blood. Two other men join the woman, helping her kill Lorre by repeatedly stabbing him using hypodermic needles.

The following day, before departing for L.A., Fox Mulder stores the missing Dana Scully's FBI badge in an X-file under her name. At the crime scene he meets with LAPD detectives investigating the case, explaining that Lorre's murder is the latest in a series of seemingly vampiric serial killings that have spanned two other states. Because the killers write biblical passages in the victims' blood, Mulder believes that they view themselves as an "Unholy Trinity."

Mulder visits a local blood bank where a night watchman has been recently hired. Mulder has him arrested after he is caught drinking blood in the facility's storeroom. During his interrogation, the suspect tells Mulder that he belongs to a trio of vampires who desire immortality; he is known as "The Son" while the other two, a man and a woman, are called "The Father" and "The Unholy Spirit". Mulder does not believe The Son's claims. However, at sunrise, The Son is burned to death when sunlight from the window touches his flesh. Mulder is taken aback, having previously assumed vampires to be purely mythological.

During an examination of The Son's body, Mulder discovers a stamp for Club Tepes, a local vampire club. There, he comes across a young woman named Kristen Kilar, who partakes in the consumption of blood. His suspicion aroused, Mulder follows Kristen after she and another club patron, David Yung, leave for an erotic liaison. He initially fears that Kristen is targeting Yung, but is beaten by Yung when he catches the agent spying on them. After Mulder leaves, Yung is murdered by the two killers, although the reason is not known.

Mulder runs a background check on Kristen, discovering that she formerly lived in Memphis and Portland—both the locations of earlier murders. Mulder assists the LAPD in searching her home, where he finds various blood-related paraphernalia. When she arrives later, Mulder is waiting for her. Kristen tells Mulder that she met The Son in Chicago and that they had engaged in "blood sports" together. Later, she fled The Son as he formed the Unholy Trinity with his accomplices and began their killing spree, following her across the country. Mulder and Kristen soon kiss while The Son, who has returned from the dead, looks on. The next morning, The Son confronts Kristen and tells her that by killing Mulder and drinking the blood of a "believer", she will become one of them.

Kristen approaches Mulder with a knife but instead stabs The Father, who is hiding in the bedroom. The Son attacks Mulder but is subdued. Mulder and Kristen try to escape using a car parked in the garage, but the Unholy Spirit jumps onto the car and attacks Mulder after smashing the windshield. Kristen jumps into the driver's seat and drives into her, impaling her on a wooden peg on the wall. Kristen tricks Mulder into running outside while she goes back into the house and pours gasoline around herself and The Son. Kristen lights a match, blowing up the house and taking her own life in order to kill the other vampires. Firefighters and police find four bodies in the ruins while Mulder stares at Scully's cross necklace.

== Production ==
"It's a very different show because it's the first one without Scully. She's been away for quite some time. It's a situation where Mulder is in a dark place, doesn't know which way to turn, and is really very much on his own. The whole vampire thing happened because he went to a dark place that he normally wouldn't have gone to."

— David Nutter on "3"

Howard Gordon was originally supposed to write the seventh episode of the season, but when he became unavailable Glen Morgan and James Wong, who were working on writing the eighth episode of the season, agreed to rewrite a freelance script provided by Chris Ruppenthal. The writers had to do significant edits, but retained the main plot surrounding three vampires.

Club Tepes — named after Vlad Tepes, the inspiration for Dracula — was shot inside a closed-down and redecorated nightclub, with extras recruited from other Vancouver clubs. The location for Kristen's house was the mansion of hockey player Pavel Bure, then of the Vancouver Canucks. The producers had an agreement for the late filming from all but one of Bure's neighbors, who was absent during the petitioning. This neighbor later tried to sue the Fox network, only agreeing to let production continue after receiving compensation.

Perrey Reeves, who played Kristen, was David Duchovny's real-life girlfriend at the time. Speaking of Mulder's possible sexual encounter with Kristen, series creator Chris Carter said, "I thought, 'This guy's a monk. Let's let him be a human. Especially in [Scully's] absence, it seemed like a perfect opportunity to do it." Duchovny had previously acted alongside another real-life girlfriend, Maggie Wheeler, in the first season episode "Born Again". Gillian Anderson is absent from the episode as she was on leave to give birth to her daughter Piper at the time. This episode was the first in which Scully did not appear.

== Reception ==
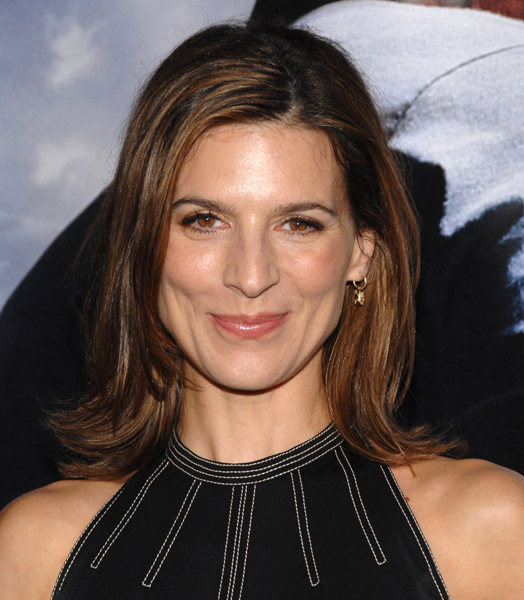
The romantic scenes between David Duchovny and his then-girlfriend Perrey Reeves (pictured) were widely criticized.

=== Ratings ===
"3" premiered on Fox on November 4, 1994. This episode earned a Nielsen rating of 9.4, with a 16 share, meaning that roughly 9.4 percent of all television-equipped households, and 16 percent of households watching television, were tuned in to the episode. It was viewed by 9 million households.

=== Reviews ===
"3" received mixed reviews from critics. While writing about vampire-related television shows for Metacritic, Zeenat Burns described the episode as "wretched". Entertainment Weekly gave the episode a C, criticizing the fact that it did not explore enough the "promising premise" of Scully's absence. Reviewer Zack Handlen of The A.V. Club also considered that said premise "deserve[d] better than to be background noise for a by-the-numbers erotic thriller". Handlen described Mulder and Kristen's "tedious romance" as "all kinds of misguided", and felt the episode indulged in "lazy writing" regarding the over-explored theme of vampires which resulted in "terrible dialogue and heavy-handed attempts at mood". He still praised Duchovny's performance and felt the first twenty minutes were "endurable trash" with a "serious USA Up All Night vibe".

Morgan felt doing an episode on vampires was a mistake, and said that they were also criticized for having Mulder fall for Kristen. Wong was also disappointed, saying that the script was a lot better than what aired and that the episode was weakened when Fox censors had problems with it. Duchovny thought the episode had style, but suffered some lapses in logic, including the scene where Kristen shaves Mulder before the two kiss.

== See also ==
- List of vampire television series

== Bibliography ==
- Gradnitzer, Louisa; Pittson, Todd (1999). X marks the spot: on location with the X-files. Arsenal Pulp Press. ISBN 1-55152-066-4.
- Edwards, Ted (1996). X-Files Confidential. Little, Brown and Company. ISBN 0-316-21808-1.
- Lovece, Frank (1996). The X-Files Declassified. Citadel Press. ISBN 0-8065-1745-X.
- Lowry, Brian (1995). The Truth is Out There: The Official Guide to the X-Files. Harper Prism. ISBN 0-06-105330-9.
