= Open All Night (TV series) =

1981 American television series

- Genre: sitcom
- Created by: Tom Patchett; Jay Tarses
- Starring: George Dzundza; Susan Tyrrell; Sam Whipple; Jay Tarses
- Composer: Tom Wells
- Country of origin: United States
- Original language: English
- No. of seasons: 1
- No. of episodes: 13 (2 unaired)

Production
- Executive producer: Bernie Brillstein
- Running time: 30 minutes
- Production company: Freeway Productions

Original release
- Network: ABC
- Release: November 28, 1981 – March 5, 1982

Open All Night is an American sitcom that aired on ABC from November 28, 1981, to March 5, 1982. The show centered on Gordon Feester (George Dzundza) and his oddball family working in an all-night chain grocery store named 364 Store that is open every day except Christmas.

The series is based on the British sitcom Open All Hours.

== Synopsis ==
Gordon Feaster lives with his new wife Gretchen, and his teenage stepson Terry, in an apartment above the 364 store he runs in a drab Los Angeles suburb. He and Terry don’t get along, and Terry likes spending time with Robin, the philosophical – and tall (6 foot 7 inches (2.01 m) – night manager.

Police officers Steve and Edie often stop by for coffee and doughnuts, but are never able to catch shoplifters or other criminals.

Jay Tarses was co-creator, writer, co-star and occasional director of the show.

Cassandra Peterson (better known for her Elvira persona) made a guest appearance on one episode. David Letterman also made a guest appearance, and made a sly reference to his daytime talk show, which was canceled a year before.

== Cast ==
=== Main ===
- George Dzundza as Gordon Feester
- Susan Tyrrell as Gretchen Feester
- Sam Whipple as Terry Hoffmeister
- Bubba Smith as Robin, the night manager
- Jay Tarses as Officer Steve
- Bever-Leigh Banfield as Officer Edie

=== Recurring ===
- Clyde Phillip Taylor as Dr. Cavanaugh, an eccentric regular customer
- Joe Mantegna appeared occasionally as an unnamed regular customer who only ever seemed to ask for change

== Scheduling change ==
ABC wanted to challenge CBS's Friday television dominance by scheduling sitcoms against The Dukes of Hazzard and Dallas, so in February 1982 Open All Night was moved from Saturdays to Fridays, where it was scheduled after Benson, and before Best of the West and Making a Living.

The schedule change was not successful, and on March 12, 1982 Open All Night was replaced by T. J. Hooker.

== Episodes ==
No.	Title	Directed by	Written by	Original release date
1	"Night Moves"	Tom Patchett	Tom Patchett & Jay Tarses	November 28, 1981
Gordon Feester, owner of a store that's open 24 hours a day, tries to remain hopeful as he struggles to make his store a profitable business.
2	"Robin's Return"	Will Mackenzie	Ed Vincent	December 5, 1981
Gordon hires his stepson Terry as night manager, but Robin, the former night manager, returns and wants his old job back.
3	"Centerfold"	Will Mackenzie	Sy Rosen	December 12, 1981
Gordon finds a picture of his wife Gretchen in an old girlie magazine.
4	"Buckaroo Buddies"	Tom Patches	Merrill March	December 26, 1981
Terry’s father, Larry Bud returns, and wants Terry to come and live with him. David Letterman guests and jokes about his career.
5	"First Love"	Tom Patchett	Carol Gray	January 2, 1982
Terry and his new girlfriend are too busy being romantic to notice that a motorcycle was driven through a store window.
6	"Terry Runs Away"	Will Mackenzie	David Isaacs & Ken Levine	January 9, 1982
Gordon feel guilty when, after he argued with Terry, his stepson leaves home to work at a creepy old motel.
7	"Sitting Ducks"	Will Mackenzie	Ken Levine	February 5, 1982
After numerous robberies Gordon holds teargas classes at home, taught by a former marine.
8	"Such Good Friends"	Tony Singletary	Carol Gary	February 12, 1982
Gordon’s contractor friend finds Gretchen attractive and lets her know he's interested in her.
9	"Scam"	Thomas McConnell	Dennis Danziger and Ellen Sandler	February 19, 1982
When Gordon and Gretchen are away Terry falls for a scam artist who claimed to have good deals on store merchandise.
10	"A Visit from the Folks"	Tony Singletary	Merrill Markoe	February 26, 1982
Gordon's parents come to meet Gretchen and Terry.
11	"The Chicken Suit"	Will Mackenzie	Thad Mumford & Dan Wilcox	March 5, 1982
When Gordon is sued over food poisoning he hires a once-prominent attorney, and meets the man while he's wearing a top hat and playing a saxophone outside of the store.
12	"Death of a Bag Lady"	Tom Patchett	Merrill Markoe	UNAIRED
13	"Edie's Girl"	TBD	TBD	UNAIRED
