= Attica (1980 film) =

1980 American TV film

- Genre: Drama
- Based on: A Time to Die: The Attica Prison Revolt by Tom Wicker
- Written by: James S. Henerson
- Directed by: Marvin J. Chomsky
- Starring: Charles Durning; George Grizzard; Glynn Turman; Anthony Zerbe
- Music by: Gil Melle
- Country of origin: United States
- Original language: English

Production
- Producer: Louis Rudolph
- Production location: Lima, Ohio
- Cinematography: Donald H. Birnkrant
- Editor: Paul LaMastra
- Running time: 97 minutes
- Production company: ABC Circle Films

Original release
- Network: ABC
- Release: March 2, 1980

Attica is a 1980 American television film directed by Marvin J. Chomsky. It stars Morgan Freeman, Henry Darrow, Charles Durning, Joel Fabiani, and Anthony Zerbe. It depicts the events leading up to and during the 1971 Attica Correctional Facility riot and the aftermath.

== Cast ==
- Henry Darrow as Herman Badillo
- Charles Durning as Commissioner Russell Oswald
- Joel Fabiani as Senator Gordon Conners
- Morgan Freeman as Hap Richards
- George Grizzard as Tom Wicker
- Roger E. Mosley as Frank Green
- Anthony Zerbe as William Kunstler
- David Harris as T. J.
- Arlen Dean Snyder as Superintendent Vince Mancusi
- Glynn Turman as Raymond Franklin
- Earl Rowe as Captain 'Pop' Cowan

== Nominations and awards ==
The film was nominated for five Primetime Emmys and eventually won one (for Outstanding Directing, Marvin J. Chomsky).
