= Reuben, Reuben =

1983 American film directed by Robert Ellis Miller

- Reuben, Reuben film poster
- Directed by: Robert Ellis Miller
- Written by: Peter De Vries (novel); Julius J. Epstein; Herman Shumlin (Spofford play)
- Produced by: Julius J. Epstein; Walter Shenson
- Starring: Tom Conti; Kelly McGillis
- Cinematography: Peter Stein
- Edited by: Skip Lusk
- Music by: Billy Goldenberg
- Production companies: Saltair Productions; TAFT Entertainment Pictures
- Distributed by: Twentieth Century Fox International Classics
- Release date: December 19, 1983 (U.S.)
- Running time: 101 min.
- Country: United States
- Language: English
- Budget: $3.5 million

Reuben, Reuben is a 1983 comedy-drama film directed by Robert Ellis Miller and starring Tom Conti, Kelly McGillis (in her film debut), Roberts Blossom, Cynthia Harris, and Joel Fabiani.

The film was adapted by Julius J. Epstein from the 1967 play Spofford by Herman Shumlin, which in turn was adapted from the 1964 novel Reuben, Reuben by Peter De Vries.

The main character in DeVries's novel was based largely on the Welsh poet Dylan Thomas, who was a compulsive womanizer and lifelong alcoholic, finally succumbing to the effects of alcohol poisoning in November 1953, while on a speaking tour in America.

== Plot ==
Gowan McGland (Tom Conti) is a creatively blocked Scottish poet who ekes out a day-to-day existence by exploiting the generosity of strangers in an affluent Connecticut suburb, where he recites his verse to various arts groups and women's clubs. Gowan is something of a leech, cadging expensive dinners from well-off patrons (usually stealing the tips afterward) while seducing their bored wives and affecting a superior attitude toward the smug bourgeois types he exploits.

Although a talented poet, he is a chronic drunk, indifferent to the wounds he can casually inflict with his wit. (When one of Gowan's middle-aged conquests undresses for him, he mutters, "Released from their support, her breasts dropped like hanged men," reducing her to tears.)

Gowan falls in love with a young college student, Geneva Spofford (Kelly McGillis), who has everything to lose from a relationship with a drunken deadbeat poet unable to hold a job. Gowan instigates two ugly incidents that eventually cause their breakup: first, a bar fight from which Geneva rescues him, and later, when he causes a scene in a fancy restaurant where the waiters know he has stolen their tips.

He also suffers an ironic comeuppance from Dr. Jack Haxby (Joel Fabiani). The dentist, after finding out about the poet's affair with his wife, uses the ruse of free dental care for ruining Gowan's smile and forcing him to wear dentures. When Gowan finds out, it is already too late, and the damage is irrevocable. (Gowan fears losing his teeth, equating it with death.)

Gowan prepares to hang himself, but while dictating his last thoughts into a tape recorder, he comes up with some good lines and regains his will to write. Unfortunately, his host's pet dog, an Old English Sheepdog named Reuben, comes bounding into the room, causing Gowan to lose his balance before he can undo the noose, turning the aborted suicide into accidental asphyxiation. The film's title comprises Gowan's final words, an unsuccessful attempt to halt the dog.

== Critical reception ==
John Simon of the National Review called Reuben, Reuben "dreadful".

Reuben, Reuben holds a 100% rating on Rotten Tomatoes based on seven reviews as of 2023.

== Accolades ==
Award	Category	Nominee(s)	Result
Academy Awards	Best Actor	Tom Conti	Nominated
Academy Awards	Best Screenplay – Based on Material from Another Medium	Julius J. Epstein	Nominated
David di Donatello Awards	Best Foreign Actor	Tom Conti	Nominated
Golden Globe Awards	Best Motion Picture – Drama		Nominated
Golden Globe Awards	Best Actor in a Motion Picture – Drama	Tom Conti	Nominated
Golden Globe Awards	Best Screenplay – Motion Picture	Julius J. Epstein	Nominated
Los Angeles Film Critics Association Awards	Best Actor	Tom Conti	Runner-up
Los Angeles Film Critics Association Awards	Best Music Score	Billy Goldenberg	Runner-up
National Board of Review Awards	Best Actor	Tom Conti	Won
Writers Guild of America Awards	Best Drama – Adapted from Another Medium	Julius J. Epstein	Won
