= Joel Fabiani =

American actor (b. 1936)

- Born: September 28, 1936 (age 90); Watsonville, California, U.S.
- Occupation: Actor
- Years active: 1960–present
- Spouses: Katharine Ross (m. 1960; div. 1962) Audree Rae (m. 1968; died 2009) Charna Greenberg (m. 2010)

Joel Fabiani (born September 28, 1936) is an American film, television and theater actor. Known for his leading role in the British TV series Department S, Fabiani has guest starred in The F.B.I., Barnaby Jones, The Streets of San Francisco, Banacek, Cannon, The Rockford Files and Starsky & Hutch.

His film appearances include Looking for Mr. Goodbar (1977); Reuben, Reuben (1983) and Tune In Tomorrow (1990), and he has also had recurring roles in soap operas such as Dallas, Dynasty, As the World Turns, and All My Children.

== Background ==
Fabiani was born in Watsonville, California, as the youngest of three children to parents whose backgrounds were a mix of Italian, Austrian, Irish and Native American roots. The family moved a lot, so young Joel attended a total of no less than 17 different schools. After graduating from high school, he joined the Army, then went to college, where he earned a degree in English and became interested in acting. After graduation, he studied at the Actors Workshop in San Francisco for two years.

== Early years in theater ==
At the San Francisco Actors Workshop, he learned acting, as well as stagecraft, and appeared in plays such as The Alchemist (1960, as Kastril), Saint's Day and Twinkling of an Eye, as well as classics such as King Lear.

After two years at the Workshop, he moved to New York, where he started out playing in summer stock and Off-Broadway productions. He appeared in One Way Pendulum (1961), was an understudy for Robert Shaw and Alan Bates in a Broadway production of The Caretaker (1961), had his Broadway debut in "The Affair" (1962), and played in A Thousand Clowns, A Funny Thing Happened on the Way to the Forum, and others, plus more Shakespeare, such as Romeo and Juliet, Richard II, and Henry IV, Part 1, as well as the U.S. tour of Beyond The Fringe (1965).

== Department S ==
Fabiani and his wife moved to the United Kingdom, where he co-starred in Department S, first screened in 1969 and 1970. The show features a fictional branch of Interpol dealing with particularly baffling cases that other agencies had failed to solve. Fabiani played the field team leader Stewart Sullivan.

In episode 2, "The Trojan Tanker", Fabiani was once more in a tuxedo, gambling in a casino, and looking very Bond-ish; and there were several episodes in which he wore the tuxedo at least for one scene, usually whenever he was meeting the head of the department Sir Curtis Seretse, played by Dennis Alaba Peters, for a briefing during some gala, opera or exclusive party. Like most SpyFi shows of the 1960s, Department S did have elements of Bond. Episode 7 for instance, "Handicap – Dead", where Sullivan attends a golf tournament in Scotland and ends up investigating the suspicious death of one of the golfers, was inspired by Goldfinger.

Fabiani was highly esteemed and appreciated by his fellow cast members. Guest star Kate O'Mara described him as "most charming" and a "perfect American gentleman". His co-star Rosemary Nicols called him "a very sweet guy, and extremely professional. He always came prepared, and he knew exactly what he was doing." And Peter Wyngarde declared, "Joel was wonderful!"

The show was syndicated worldwide, including the US. At one point in the early 1970s it was voted the most popular series in the world. "For his part, Fabiani wasn't too disappointed that no more episodes were commissioned. 'When I came back to the States from England, I […] wanted to go out and conquer Hollywood, which is what I immediately set out to do – and didn't – but I had an awful lot of fun trying.' "

== Hollywood ==
Fabiani returned to television work, at first still very much in line with his Department S character, such as playing the FBI agent Barris in the TV movie The Longest Night (1972) opposite David Janssen. Then he went on to guest star in many other television shows, including The F.B.I., Banacek, Barnaby Jones, Cannon, The Streets of San Francisco, The Rockford Files, Matt Helm, S.W.A.T., Starsky & Hutch, Columbo and Black Sheep Squadron, playing good guys and villains alike, from lawyers, prosecutors and doctors to pilots, P.I.s and gangsters.

He also appeared in numerous TV movies, including Brenda Starr (1976) with Jill St. John, thrillers like the Edgar Allan Poe Award–nominated One of My Wives Is Missing (1976) with Jack Klugman and The President's Mistress (1978) with Beau Bridges and Larry Hagman, and the prison movie Attica (1980) with Morgan Freeman, which was nominated for several Emmys and won one.

In between, he still worked in the theatre, appearing in Broadway plays such as Love for Love (1974) and Luigi Pirandello's The Rules of the Game (1975, as Barelli) – a show that was also featured in the PBS Great Performances series – as well as "Ashes" (1977, as Colin), the original run of the musical I'm Getting My Act Together and Taking It on the Road (1978, as Joe Epstein), the courtroom drama As To The Meaning of Words (1981, as Alexander Thomas), and more.

In addition he appeared in several feature films, including high-profile movies such as Looking for Mr. Goodbar (1977), the Oscar-nominated Reuben, Reuben (1983), and Tune In Tomorrow (1990). Others were the independent movie Dark Echoes (1977), which, ahead of its time, was a kind of forerunner of John Carpenter's The Fog (1980), and mainstream movies like Snake Eyes (1998).

== Prime time dramas ==
From the 1980s on, he had several recurring roles in prime time soaps, where he appeared as publisher Alex Ward in Dallas and played the role of King Galen of Moldavia on Dynasty, where his son's wedding, unceremoniously interrupted by terrorists shooting at the gathered crowd, provided the famous season 5 cliffhanger finale. The viewers then had to wait quite a while until it was finally revealed that most of the characters, including King Galen, had – despite initial rumors to the contrary – indeed survived the attack. Fabiani also guest starred in Hotel, and had the somewhat difficult task of assessing Angela Channing's mental capacities as Dr. Quentin King in Falcon Crest.

Later he moved back to New York, and also played in day time dramas, where he served as temporary replacement for Michael Zaslow as Roger Thorpe four times on Guiding Light in February 1991, August 1992, early 1994 and late May to June 1995 while Zaslow was on personal leave, played a major part in The City as Jared Chase in 1996, had a recurring role in As the World Turns as Winston Lowe/"Mr. Smith" in 2000 and a long run on All My Children (from 1999 to 2010) as Barry Shire (whom a soap magazine labelled a "bona fide scene stealer"), a lawyer who never seemed to run out of work trying to get either Chandler Enterprises or various members of the Chandler clan out of trouble, out of court, or out of jail... or all of the above. (Or, as the magazine put it, "Adam's crazy antics on AMC keep Barry - and Fabiani - busy!" )

He continued to guest star in other shows too, including Murder, She Wrote (in 1992 and 1994), Third Watch (2000), Law & Order (2004) and Law and Order: Criminal Intent (2004). The latter's episode meant a reunion with Claire Bloom - with whom he had worked over thirty years before in the theater - and centered around the events at a fundraiser. In between he had occasional parts in TV comedy series, such as The Cosby Show (1988), Strangers With Candy (2000) and Ed (2003), and also kept appearing in plays in the theater.

== Other projects ==
He appeared as presenter in theater documentaries, such as Ghosts of Glory about Eugene O"Neill and his plays, which was hosted by Joanne Woodward. Fabiani, said to have "an uncanny ability to imitate numerous voices, moods, and inflections", also narrated audio books, including Norman McLean's A River Runs Through It, Conrad Richter's The Light in the Forest, and Loren D. Estleman's award-winning Aces and Eights.

== Other notes ==
At the very beginning of his career, he was married to Katharine Ross. (They first met and started dating at Santa Rosa Junior College in 1957, then later resumed dating when studying at the San Francisco Actors Workshop together.) They married on February 28, 1960, and later divorced after about two and a half years of marriage, in 1962.

Fabiani then married actress Audree Rae, whom he also met while they were doing a stage play together. This proved to be a long-lasting relationship (until her death in 2009), while Ross went on to have four more husbands. While Fabiani and Ross had appeared on stage together, they never had any screen appearances together. (The closest they came was in 1985/86, when Ross appeared on the Dynasty spinoff The Colbys, while Fabiani appeared on Dynasty.)

== Stage ==
Fabiani started out at the San Francisco Actor's Workshop and afterwards worked with several theater companies over the years, including the National Touring Company, Phoenix Theater Company, Paper Mill Playhouse, and the American Shakespeare Festival, appearing in numerous plays both on and off Broadway, including:

- Career (Stage Debut)
- The Alchemist (1960)
- The Marriage of Mr. Mississippi (1960)
- The Devil's Disciple (1960)
- Saint's Day (1960)
- Twinkling of an Eye (1961)
- King Lear (1961)
- The Caretaker (1961)
- One Way Pendulum (1961) (US Version)
- Richard II (1962)
- Henry IV, Part 1 (1962)
- The Affair (1962)
- Dark Corners (1963)
- A Doll's House (1963)
- Escurial
- Sabrina Fair
- A Thousand Clowns
- A Funny Thing Happened on the Way to the Forum
- The Seven Year Itch
- Bus Stop
- Mr. Grossman
- Romeo and Juliet
- The King and I
- Any Wednesday (1964)
- Beyond the Fringe (1965, U.S. Tour)
- Do I Hear a Waltz? (1966)
- Marat/Sade (1966)
- Hedda Gabler (1968)
- One Flew Over The Cuckoo's Nest (1971)
- Death of a Salesman
- Candle in the Wind (1974)
- Love for Love (1974)
- The Rules of the Game (1975)
- Ashes (1977)
- I'm Getting My Act Together and Taking It on the Road (1978)
- As to the Meaning of Words (1981)
- Family Values (1996–1997)

== TV series and TV movies ==
Fabiani appeared in many television shows in either starring, recurring, or guest starring roles, as well as numerous television movies and half a dozen feature films. Overview:

- 1963 Love of Life
- 1963 The Doctors as a patient
- 1964 Look Up and Live
- 1967 1999 A.D.
- 1966 The Hero (TV series) as Trayton
- 1967 Ironside (TV movie) as Dr. Schley
- 1967 Dark Shadows (TV series) as Paul Stoddard (in a flashback)
- 1967 N.Y.P.D. (TV series) as Welbeck
- 1968 The Doctors as Joe Finch
- 1969 Department S (TV series) as Stewart Sullivan
- 1972 Women in Chains (TV movie)
- 1972 Particular Men (TV movie) as Henry
- 1972 The Longest Night (TV movie) as Barris
- 1972 Owen Marshall, Counsellor at Law (TV series) as Donald Parish
- 1972 The Sixth Sense (TV series) as Edward Melick
- 1972 Marcus Welby, M.D. (TV series) as Dr. Matt Willis
- 1973 Banacek (TV series) as Art Woodward
- 1973 Beg, Borrow...or Steal (TV movie) as Kevin Turner
- 1973 The F.B.I. (TV series) as Felton
- 1973-1975 The Wide World of Mystery (TV series) as Pete
- 1973-1975 The Streets of San Francisco (TV series) as Eli Mason / Matthew Starr
- 1973-1975 Cannon (TV series) as Sean Donohue / Carl Blessing
- 1974 Nicky's World (TV movie) as Mr. Block
- 1974 Barnaby Jones (TV series) as Larry Colter / Stephen Chadway / Dr. David Bellman
- 1975 Great Performances (TV series) as Barelli
- 1975 The Rockford Files (TV series) as Thompkins
- 1976 Matt Helm (TV series) as Kyle Dennison
- 1976 S.W.A.T. (TV series) as Ronald Parker
- 1976 One of My Wives Is Missing (TV movie) as Father Kelleher
- 1976 McNaughton's Daughter (TV mini-series) as Dr. Anthony Lanza
- 1976 City of Angels (TV series) as Harris
- 1976 Brenda Starr (TV movie) as Carlos Vegas
- 1976 The New Daughters of Joshua Cabe (TV movie) as Matt Cobley
- 1976 Jigsaw John (TV series) as D.L. Stevenson
- 1976 Risko (TV movie) as Allen Burnett
- 1976 Starsky & Hutch (TV series) as Alexander Drew
- 1977 Switch (TV series) as J.D. Stolvac
- 1977 Looking for Mr. Goodbar as Barney
- 1977 Black Sheep Squadron
- 1977 Dark Echoes as Bill Cross
- 1978 The President's Mistress (TV movie) as Jim Gilkrest
- 1978 The New Adventures of Wonder Woman (TV series) as Nightingale
- 1978 Columbo (TV series) as Dr. Charles Hunter
- 1978 Tom and Joann (TV movie) as Tom Hammil
- 1980 Attica (TV movie) as Senator Gordon Conners
- 1980 King Crab (TV movie) as Lucian Trumble
- 1980-1981 Dallas (TV series) as Alex Ward
- 1981 Flamingo Road (TV series) as Remington Bartlett
- 1983 Reuben, Reuben as Dr. Jack Haxby
- 1984 Santa Barbara (TV series) as Brubaker
- 1985-1986 Dynasty (TV series) as King Galen of Moldavia
- 1986 Hotel
- 1986 American Masters: Eugene O'Neill – A Glory of Ghosts
- 1987-2003 Barbara Walters Specials (TV series) as Narrator
- 1988 The Cosby Show (TV series) as Richard
- 1989 Falcon Crest (TV series) as Dr. Quentin King
- 1990 Tune in Tomorrow as Ted Orson
- 1992-1994 Murder, She Wrote (TV series) as Thornton Brewer / Boris Steloff
- 1994 General Hospital (TV series) as Maybury
- 1995 The City (TV series) as Jared Chase
- 1995 Guiding Light (TV series)
- 1995 Loving (TV series)
- 1997 Feds (TV series) as Captain Collins
- 1997 Port Charles (TV series) as Maybury
- 1998 Snake Eyes as US Secretary of Defense Charles Kirkland
- 1999-2000 As the World Turns (TV series) as Winston Lowe / Mr. Smith
- 1999-2010 All My Children (TV series) as Barry Shire
- 2000 Strangers with Candy (TV series) as Doctor
- 2000 Strong Medicine (TV series) as Jay Harper
- 2000 Third Watch (TV series) as Minister
- 2003 Ed (TV series) as Kevin Reidy
- 2004 Law & Order: Criminal Intent (TV series) as Daniel
- 2004 Law & Order (TV series) as Faber
- 2008 Wanna Watch a Television Series – Ch.1: Variations on a Theme (documentary) as Himself
- 2008 Wanna Watch a Television Series – Ch.2: A Fish Out of Water (documentary) as Himself
