= Athina Krikeli =

Greek journalist and documentarian

Athina Krikeli (Greek: Αθηνά Κρικέλη), born in Thessaloniki, is a Greek journalist and documentarian. She studied journalism in London for three years and has an MA in Mass Media from a university in New York City. She is the founder and CEO of the Ellopia Media Group.

== Career ==
Athina Krikeli is a correspondent for the Voice of America in New York, and a political correspondent for ERT 3, the national television channel of northern Greece. Her radio show "Ta Dika Mas" Antenna is showcased on a permanent exhibition at The Paley Center for Media. She is a member of the National Academy of Television Arts and Sciences, the Society of Motion Picture and Television Engineers the Foreign Press Association and the United Nations Correspondents Association. She is a partner of HONEYBEE Productions Company in Greece a dedicated artistic company that works to promote Greece, Hellas, and Greek Culture abroad.

She is the publisher of the monthly Greek American magazine "Ellopia Press". She is the creator of web pages for Katoikos Ampelokipon, Soloist Nikos Tatasopoulos, the Broadcast Pros, the Metropolitan city of the Island of Chios.

== Panels ==
Krikeli is the only Greek woman who is on the voting panel at the Emmys and at the New York festivals. She is also a member of AIVA an International Organization for Davey and W3 Awards Competitions.

== Awards ==
Athina Krikeli received the 'Award of Excellence' from the Best Short films Competition 2015 USA for her latest documentary: Mt.Olympus: Elassona the secret path" the "Award of Merit" 2015 from Indee International Film festival 2015 for the same documentary. She has won four TELLY AWARDS(2 Silver Telly Awards and 2 Bronze Telly Awards in 2006 and 2007). In 1997, she received an award from the mayor of New York Rudolph Giuliani for her contribution to New York culture. In 2001, she won an award for her documentary "On the Move", as well as Best Documentary Award for "The Enclaved", a report on the enclaved Greek Cypriots in the occupied territories of the Republic of Cyprus. She has been awarded 3 times by Konstantinos Stephanopoulos (a former president of Greece). In 2011 she won First Prize Award "Best political documentary in the USA and Internationally" from the New York International Film Festival New York International Film festival She won 1st prize award "political documentary" in the US and Abroad from the New York International Film Festival. Her recent documentary about the explosion at Mari Naval Base in Cyprus '13 Knocked at my door"
