= Trap for a Lonely Man =

1990 Soviet comedy detective film by Aleksey Korenev

- Film poster
- Russian: Ловушка для одинокого мужчины
- Directed by: Aleksey Korenev
- Screenplay by: Aleksey Korenev
- Based on: Trap for a Lonely Man by Robert Thomas
- Starring: Nikolai Karachentsov; Yury Yakovlev; Irina Shmelyova; Veniamin Smekhov; Innokenty Smoktunovsky
- Cinematography: Anatoly Mukasei
- Edited by: Irma Tsekavaya
- Music by: Maksim Dunayevsky
- Production company: Creative Unification Entertainment Film
- Distributed by: State Committee for Cinematography
- Release date: 19 December 1990
- Running time: 87 minutes
- Country: Soviet Union
- Language: Russian

Trap for a Lonely Man (Russian: Ловушка для одинокого мужчины, romanized: Lovushka dlya odinokogo muzhchiny) is a 1990 Soviet comedy mystery film detective film directed by Aleksey Korenev. It is based on the 1960 play Trap for a Single Man by Robert Thomas.

The film tells about a man whose wife was missing, which forced him to turn to the police. Suddenly, a local curé brings to him a woman who calls herself his wife, and he claims that he never saw her.

== Plot ==
The story is set in a suburb somewhere in France. Newlywed Daniel Corban approaches the police commissioner to report the disappearance of his wife, Elizabeth. A few days later, Madame Corban returns home accompanied by a local priest, but Daniel is stunned by her appearance and refuses to recognize her as his lawful wife. He believes this woman is an imposter attempting to claim his fortune. Elizabeth is an orphan, and Daniel has no photos or identification documents to prove her identity. No one can corroborate Daniel’s story, as the couple married recently and in a secluded location.

Complications arise when a drunken artist nicknamed "Papa Merlush," who was a random witness at Daniel and Elizabeth's wedding, unexpectedly appears. He offers to describe the real Elizabeth's appearance in exchange for payment. However, the imposter "wife" shoots Merlush, accusing Daniel of the murder. The police commissioner calls in a nurse, Yvonne Berto, who had previously treated Elizabeth, as a witness. Berto openly negotiates her testimony, offering to either confirm or deny the imposter’s identity based on who pays her more. Ultimately, Daniel loses control and confesses that the real Elizabeth is dead, revealing that her body is in a mountain stream in the Chamois forest.

In the finale, the police commissioner reveals that he orchestrated the entire scenario as a staged performance to elicit Daniel Corban’s confession to his wife's murder. Elizabeth’s body had already been discovered, and the commissioner immediately suspected her husband. Instead of conducting routine interrogations, he devised this unconventional plan. A married actor couple, the Tarks, played the roles of the priest and Elizabeth, while the real witnesses—Papa Merlush and Nurse Berto—were also involved. The plan successfully traps the perpetrator.

== Cast ==
- Nikolai Karachentsov as Daniel Corban
- Yury Yakovlev as the Police Commissioner
- Irina Shmelyova as "Elisabeth Corban"
- Veniamin Smekhov as Curé Maximin
- Innokenty Smoktunovsky as Merluche
- Yelena Koreneva as Yvonne Berton
- Sergey Migitsko as Jean

== Production ==
The film was shot at the Yalta Film Studio.

== Reception ==
Aleksandr Kolbovsky of Sputnik kinozritelya praised the actors' performances, but still found them generally lacking a French style, and concluded that the film is "unpretentious, but entertaining and even at times fascinating".
