= Sam Whipple =

American actor (1960–2002)

- Born: Sampson E. Whipple; September 25, 1960; Venice, California, U.S.
- Died: June 3, 2002 (aged 41); Los Angeles, California, U.S.
- Years active: 1981–2002

Sampson E. Whipple (September 25, 1960 – June 3, 2002) was an American actor best remembered for his role as Dr. John Ballard on the TV series Seven Days.

His credits include The Doors, Airheads, This Is Spinal Tap and The Rock. He also appeared in television shows such as Open All Night, The Larry Sanders Show, Seinfeld, and Home Improvement.

On June 3, 2002, Whipple died at age 41 after a two-year battle with cancer.

== Filmography ==
Year	Title	Role	Notes
1981	Grad Night	Gary	Film debut
1981-1982	Open All Night	Terry Hoffmeister	13 episodes
1982	Jekyll and Hyde... Together Again	Produce Man	
1984	This Is Spinal Tap	Recording Engineer	Uncredited
1984	Buffalo Bill	Karl Shub, Jr.	2 episodes
1984	The World of Don Camillo	Gigio	
1984	Family Ties	Jack Driscoll / Bill	2 episodes
1985	Moonlighting	Kathleen's One-night Stand	Episode: "Somewhere Under the Rainbow"
1986	Blue City	Jailer	
1986	ALF	Sam	Episode: "On the Road Again"
1987	Newhart	Sam	Episode: "My Two and Only"
1990	Archie: To Riverdale and Back Again	Jughead Jones	TV movie
1990	A Very Retail Christmas	Osgood	NBC Christmas special
1991	The Doors	Ed Sullivan's producer	
1991	The Gambler Returns: The Luck of the Draw	Bert Jeeter	TV movie
1992	The Larry Sanders Show	Makeup Artist	5 episodes
1993	Parker Lewis Can't Lose	Reverend Gandin	Episode: "Musso: A Wedding"
1994	Space Rangers	Lawson	Episode: "To Be... Or Not to Be"
1994	Night Driving	Minister	
1994	Airheads	Personal Manager	
1994	Grace Under Fire	Lawson	Episode: "Jimmy's Girl"
1994	The 5 Mrs. Buchanans	Lawson	Episode: "The Incredible Journey"
1995	Home Improvement	Usher	Episode: "No, No, Godot"
1996	The Great White Hype	Artie	
1996	The Rock	Larry Henderson	
1996	Little Surprises	Joe Jr.	
1996	Dark Skies	J. Allen Hynek	Episode: "Hostile Convergence"
1997	Delivery	Mr. Mackintosh	
1998	Three	Dr. Migollito Vellar	Episode: "The Item"
1998	NYPD Blue	Willy	Episode: "A Box of Wendy"
1998	Seinfeld	Phone Guy #1	Episode: "The Maid"
1998-2000	Seven Days	Dr. John Ballard	30 episodes
2001	Last Ride	Snowboard Rep	
2002	Special Unit 2	Wishing Will	Episode: "The Wish"
2003	Straighten Up America	Jack	Posthumous release (final film role)
