= Justina Vail Evans =

British actress, life coach, author and hypnotherapist

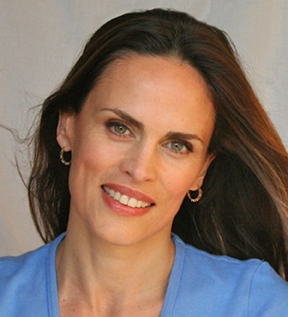
- Born: 20 August 1963 (age 62); Kuala Lumpur, Malaysia
- Education: Canterbury College of Art
- Occupations: Actress, life coach
- Years active: 1984–2010
- Spouse(s): Jeff Evans, PhD
- Website: justinavail.com

Justina Vail Evans (born 20 August 1963), previously credited as Justina Vail, is a British actress, life coach, author and hypnotherapist.

== Early life ==
Vail Evans was born in Kuala Lumpur, Malaysia in 1963 to British parents. She moved to Hong Kong in 1971 and to England in 1975 where she attended Beechwood Sacred Heart School and the Kent Institute of Art & Design (formerly Canterbury College of Art) to study fine art. She acquired her first acting role in Hong Kong where a British television show was filming.

== Career ==
Vail Evans is co-owner and Director of Training at Envision Coach Training, an executive coach training program accredited by the International Coach Federation (ICF). She is an ICF Master Certified Coach (MCC) and provides life coaching, executive coaching, hypnotherapy and neuro-linguistic programming (NLP) in her private practice.

Vail Evans retired as an actor in 2001 in order to pursue her current career. Her most notable acting role was as a Russian scientist Dr. Olga Vukavitch in the late 1990s and early 2000s UPN science fiction television series Seven Days. Vail received positive reviews for her performance on the show. In 2000, she won a Saturn Award for best supporting actress, winning out over Stargate SG-1's Amanda Tapping. In 2001, however, there were reports of dissatisfaction on set. Co-star Don Franklin expressed his dissatisfaction with the show, and Vail was reported to have left the show entirely (according to some show sources over a dispute with Seven Days co-star Jonathan LaPaglia), only to later return and finish the third season.

She also appeared in The X-Files as the Unholy Spirit.

In September/October 1997, Vail Evans also guest-starred in an episode of Highlander: The Series. The episode (along with several others like it) were attempts to pilot female immortal leads for the short-lived Highlander: The Raven. Reviews of the episode were mixed, offering criticism of Vail's character but not her performance. Ultimately, Vail's character was not the one chosen for the new show.

== Personal life ==
Vail Evans is married to Dr. Jeff Evans, author and CEO of Envision Global Leadership. Vail Evans is also an author. She has been a recurring columnist for Backstage magazine, and in 2012 she published her book How to be a Happy Actor in a Challenging Business: A Guide to Thriving Through it All. It was awarded the top prize of the "How To" category for the 2012 Hollywood Book Festival.

== Filmography ==
Year	Title	Role	Notes
1990	Yellowthread Street	Caroline	(TV series, 1 episode: "Slicing the Dragon")
1990	Shadow of China	Caroline	
1991	Super Force	Hostess	(TV series, 1 episode: "Come Under the Way: Part 2")
1991	The Adventures of Superboy	Dr. Winger's Assistant	(TV series, 2 episodes)
1992	The Commish	Anna Trentino	(TV series, 1 episode: "Sleep of the Just")
1992	The Adventures of Superboy	Dr. Odessa Vexman	(TV series, 2 episodes)
1993	Journey to the Center of the Earth	Devin	Television movie
1994	The X-Files	The Unholy Spirit	(TV series, 1 episode: "3")
1995	Marker	Irina	(TV series, 1 episode: "From Russia Without Love")
1996	Naked Souls	Amelia	
1996	Seinfeld	Amanda	(TV series, 1 episode: "The Bizarro Jerry")
1996	Carnosaur 3: Primal Species	Proudfoot	
1996	Jerry Maguire	Former Girlfriend	
1997	Pacific Blue	Maggie Garrity	(TV series, 1 episode: "Runaway")
1997	Highlander: The Series	Katya	(TV series, 1 episode: "Justice")
1997	Suddenly Susan	Gina	(TV series, 1 episode: "Where the Wild Things Aren't")
1997	Kiss the Girls	Beautiful Girl	
1998	Conan the Adventurer	Zotana	(TV series, 1 episode: "The Crystal Arrow")
1998–2001	Seven Days	Dr. Olga Vukovitch	(TV series, 66 episodes); Saturn Award for Best Supporting Actress on Television
2009	General Hospital	Dr. Ingrid Hensen	(TV series, 6 episodes)
2010	Cold Case	Zelda Panay '71	(TV series, 1 episode: "Metamorphosis")

== Bibliography ==
- How to Be a Happy Actor in a Challenging Business: A Guide to Thriving Through It All, CreateSpace, 2012, ISBN 978-1-47752-221-9
