= As To The Meaning of Words =

Stage play by Mark Eichman

As to the Meaning of Words is a stage play written by Mark Eichman about a slightly fictionalized account of a 1975 court case in which a physician who had performed a seemingly legal abortion was afterwards charged with manslaughter. The play premiered in New York in 1981 and is classified as a courtroom drama.

== Summary ==
The play opened in June 1981 at the American Theater of Actors in New York. The doctor accused of manslaughter (whose real name was Dr. Kenneth Edelin), here named Dr. Winston Gerrard, is portrayed as a rather passive character; on the opposite end of the scale is the aggressive prosecutor, with the defense counsel in the middle. There are many witnesses for both sides. The play does not seem to favor either side or position, presenting "just the facts".

== Reception ==
Some reviewers criticized the author for not taking sides. The New York Times commented that "Mr. Eichman's scrupulous fairness might serve him better if he were a judge rather than a playwright." Critics were generally satisfied with the "competent cast", but found the material all in all lacked drama.

== Cast and crew ==
Presented by the New York Theater Studio (artistic director: Richard V. Romagnoli; managing director: Cheryl Faraone), written by Mark Eichman, and directed by Ted Snowden, the play premiered in June 1981 at the American Theater of Actors, 314 West 54th Street, with the following cast:

- Dr. Winston Gerrard - Ron Foster
- Alexander Thomas - Joel Fabiani
- Ned Ryan - John Bentley
- Judge Horace J. Wheeting - Thomas Ruisinger
- Dr. Madelyn Foster - Fran Salisbury
- Dr. Ramon Norriega - Felipe Gorostiza
- Dr. Clarence Parrish - Bill McCutcheon
- Dr. Jonathan Wallace - Dann Florek
- Nurse Gloria Sanders - Stephanie Musnick
- Clerk - Sally Burnett
- Voices - Harry Bennet & Mary Cunniff
