= The Butcher's Wife =

1991 film by Terry Hughes

- Theatrical poster
- Directed by: Terry Hughes
- Written by: Ezra Litwak; Marjorie Schwartz
- Produced by: Lauren Lloyd; Wallis Nicita
- Starring: Demi Moore; Jeff Daniels; George Dzundza; Frances McDormand; Margaret Colin; Mary Steenburgen
- Cinematography: Frank Tidy
- Edited by: Donn Cambern
- Music by: Michael Gore; Steven Jae Johnson
- Distributed by: Paramount Pictures
- Release date: October 25, 1991
- Running time: 105 minutes
- Country: United States
- Language: English
- Box office: $9,689,816

The Butcher's Wife is a 1991 American romantic comedy-drama film directed by Terry Hughes and starring Demi Moore and Jeff Daniels.

The film concerns Marina, a clairvoyant woman (Moore) who thinks that she's met her future husband Leo Lemke, whom she has seen in her dreams and who is a butcher in New York City. They marry and move to the city, where her powers tend to influence everyone she meets while working in the shop. Through her advice, she helps others and eventually finds the true man of her dreams in a psychiatrist Dr. Alex Tremor (Daniels).

The Butcher's Wife was a critical and commercial failure, grossing only $9 million at the box office. According to her 2019 memoir Inside Out, Moore regretted starring in the film, saying she only did it to increase her fee after the success of Ghost.

== Plot ==
On the island of Ocracoke, an island off the coast of North Carolina, a clairvoyant named Marina discovers a twin-tailed comet in the sky, a snow globe on shore, and a wedding band inside a fish, omens indicating she will soon find her perfect mate. After envisioning the man's smile in a dream, she assumes it belongs to Leo Lemke, a middle-aged New York City butcher visiting the island. Two days later, Leo returns to the city with his new bride, to the astonishment of his customer Robyn Graves. After Marina recounts their whirlwind romance, Robyn wonders if she will ever be as certain about her boyfriend, psychiatrist Alex Tremor. Marina has a vision of Robyn's true love, whom Robyn mistakenly believes to be Alex. That evening in the apartment across the street, Alex reacts to Robyn's sudden marriage proposal with skepticism over Marina's psychic abilities. On a nearby rooftop, aspiring young artist Eugene Kearney gazes at Marina as she looks up at the stars.

In the morning, Leo discovers the message, "We are all in the gutter, but some of us are looking at the stars", artistically rendered on the butcher shop window by Eugene. Eugene offers to remove the message but Marina likes it and hires Eugene to work in the shop, despite warnings from Leo about his poor reputation. Alex appears moments later, reminding Eugene to attend his psychotherapy session, as prescribed by the boy's probation officer. Marina cuts veal chops against Leo's wishes, and within seconds, a trendoid art patron enters asking for veal chops. Despite his amazement at Marina's prescience, Alex disapproves of the advice she gave Robyn, believing she is foolish to live by something as primitive as female intuition.

While exploring her new neighborhood, Marina wanders into a dress shop and convinces dowdy choir mistress Stella Keefover to buy a flashy evening gown, as she will soon be performing in a nightclub. Realizing the impracticality of walking barefoot in the city, Marina buys a pair of shoes, for which she pays $3.50, misinterpreting shopkeeper Grace's request for $350.00. During a therapy session with Alex, Stella shocks him by announcing her intention to become a blues singer inspired by Marina's advice. That evening, Grace approaches Marina about the outstanding balance on the shoes, but changes her mind after Marina gives her a package of steaks, predicting Grace will soon be cooking for two.

The next day, Grace exasperates Alex by canceling weekend plans with him and Robyn, certain that she will meet her true love if she remains in the city, as Marina predicted. At the butcher shop, Leo fears that Marina may be a voodoo practitioner, after discovering a mojo given to her by elderly neighbors Molly and Gina, and a pet chicken, given to her by Eugene. At Leo's request, Marina attends a session with Alex, but she convinces him to spend the hour roller skating in the park. Stella gives her debut performance at Dellago's tavern and enthralls Leo with her rendition of a song made famous by his idol, blues singer Bessie Smith. Meanwhile, Marina demonstrates her psychic ability by holding Alex's hands and recounting key moments from his childhood. Later, as they sit on Alex's roof, Marina explains that Leo is her split-apart, based on a legend told by her grandmother Grammy D'Arbo. According to the legend, humanity consisted of hermaphroditic creatures that the gods split into individual genders, leaving each with the challenge of reclaiming their other half. Alex attributes the story to the philosopher Plato and argues that marriage requires a stronger foundation. Leo confesses his romantic feelings for Stella, but refuses to be unfaithful to Marina, while Alex is troubled by his attraction to Marina, and struggles to find a psychological solution.

The next day, Stella excitedly tells Marina about her evening with Leo, until she realizes he is married to her psychic advisor. Certain that her marriage was a mistake, Marina is determined to find Leo a new wife. Leo assumes Marina is losing her mind and blames Alex for her behavior. Late that night, Marina awakens Alex to say he was the man she saw in her dream. He argues that Marina is merely getting revenge on Leo for having an affair, not realizing that she is unaware of Leo's budding romance. Her mind clouded with anger, Marina returns to work the following day and falsely accuses Eugene of stealing. She later apologizes and refers him to the art patron, assuring him that she will launch his career.

At their next session, Alex encourages Stella to pursue a romance with Leo and while Leo is happy with this development, he is furious at Alex for meddling in his personal life. When Alex confronts Marina, blaming her for disrupting the community, she accuses him of lacking the courage to understand the world beyond his textbooks. Marina apologizes to Leo for their failed marriage and returns to her island. Alex seeks emotional support from Grace and discovers that Robyn is her new lover. Days pass, and after seeing a twin-tailed comet in the sky, Alex travels to Ocracoke where he is reunited with Marina. Months later, Alex and Marina celebrate their wedding at Dellago's and Eugene opens his own art studio.

== Cast ==
- Demi Moore as Marina Lemke
  - Sara Noel Herring as Young Marina
- Jeff Daniels as Dr. Alex Tremor
- George Dzundza as Leo Lemke
- Mary Steenburgen as Stella Keefover
- Frances McDormand as Grace
- Margaret Colin as Robyn Graves
- Max Perlich as Eugene
- Miriam Margolyes as Gina
- Helen Hanft as Molly
- Christopher Durang as Mr. Liddle
- Luis Avalos as Luis
- Elizabeth Lawrence as Grammy D'Arbo
- Diane Salinger as Trendoid
- Thomas Mikal Ford as Transvestite
- Scott Thompson Baker as Fire Breather

== Reception ==
On review aggregator website Rotten Tomatoes, the film holds an approval rating of 28%, based on 18 reviews, and an average rating of 4.6/10. Audiences polled by CinemaScore gave the film an average grade of "B" on an A+ to F scale.

Janet Maslin of The New York Times wrote "Too much of the film is spent matching up lovers who must almost literally get their stars uncrossed in order to find happiness. But a lot of it is enjoyably buoyant, even when it's several shades too broad."

== Awards and nominations ==
At the 12th Golden Raspberry Awards, Demi Moore was nominated for the Golden Raspberry Award for Worst Actress for her performances in this film and Nothing but Trouble.
