= Robert Thomas (director) =

French actor and author (1927–1989)

- Born: September 28, 1927; Gap, Hautes-Alpes
- Died: January 3, 1989 (aged 61); Paris
- Occupations: Playwright and Director
- Notable work: 8 Women
- Awards: 1961 Hachette Prix du Quai des Orfevres for Best Play

Robert Thomas (28 September 1927 in Gap, Hautes-Alpes – 3 January 1989) was a French playwright and director.

As a writer, almost from the beginning, he was fascinated by a curious genre that he helped invent: the comédie policière or comedy thriller, of which Eight Women is an example. In 1960, Thomas had a hit with Piège Pour un Homme Seul (Trap for a Single Man), a humorous murder mystery which was an overnight success in Paris. Alfred Hitchcock bought the rights and the play established Thomas as a writer of psychological crime dramas with a distinctively Gallic comic twist. The following year, Eight Women won the Hachette Prix du Quai des Orfevres for Best Play.

Eight Women was adapted into a movie musical by François Ozon in 2002 with roles played by actors including Catherine Deneuve, Fanny Ardant and Emmanuelle Béart.

Thomas died in 1989 in Paris.
