= 1996 in Australian literature =

This article presents a list of the historical events and publications of Australian literature during 1996.

== Events ==
- Christopher Koch won the Miles Franklin Award for Highways to a War
- David Malouf won the International Dublin Literary Award for Remembering Babylon
- The Ned Kelly Awards, honouring excellence in Australian crime writing, are presented for the first time

== Major publications ==
=== Novels ===
- Thea Astley — The Multiple Effects of Rainshadow
- James Cowan — A Mapmaker's Dream
- Robert Dessaix — Night Letters: A Journey Through Switzerland and Italy Edited and Annotated by Igor Miazmov
- Garry Disher — The Sunken Road
- Robert Drewe — The Drowner
- David Foster — The Glade Within the Grove
- Clive James — The Silver Castle
- David Malouf — The Conversations at Curlow Creek
- John A. Scott — Before I Wake
- Janette Turner Hospital — Oyster
- Morris West — Vanishing Point
- Sue Woolfe — Leaning Towards Infinity

=== Short story anthologies ===
- Kerryn Goldsworthy — Australian Love Stories (edited)

=== Science fiction and fantasy ===
- Russell Blackford – "The Sword of God"
- Sara Douglass
  - Enchanter
  - StarMan
- Matthew Reilly — Contest
- Jane Routley — Mage Heart
- Dirk Strasser — Equinox
- Lucy Sussex — The Scarlet Rider
- Sean Williams
  - Metal Fatigue
  - "Passing the Bone"

=== Crime ===
- Jon Cleary – Endpeace
- Peter Doyle – Get Rich Quick
- Shane Maloney – The Brush-Off
- Peter Temple – Bad Debts

=== Children's and young adult fiction ===
- Hilary Bell — Mirror, Mirror
- Isobelle Carmody – Green Monkey Dreams
- Margaret Clark — Fat Chance
- Sonya Hartnett — Black Foxes
- Kerry Greenwood — The Broken Wheel
- John Marsden — Checkers
- James Moloney — A Bridge to Wiseman's Cove

=== Poetry ===
- Eric Beach — Weeping for Lost Babylon
- Lisa Bellear — Dreaming in Urban Areas
- Judith Beveridge — Accidental Grace
- John Kinsella — The Undertow: New and Selected Poems
- Anthony Lawrence — The Viewfinder
- Les Murray — Subhuman Redneck Poems
- Dorothy Porter — Crete
- Morgan Yasbincek — Night Reversing

=== Drama ===
- Nick Enright — Blackrock
- Jenny Kemp — The Black Sequin Dress
- Debra Oswald — Gary's House
- David Williamson — Heretic

=== Non-fiction ===
- Bronwyn Donaghy — Anna's Story
- Doris Pilkington Garimara — Follow the Rabbit-Proof Fence
- Helen Garner — True Stories: Selected Non-Fiction

== Awards and honours ==
- Mavis Thorpe Clark AM "for service to the arts as the author of children's literature and as an active member of the writer's organisations in Australia"
- Susanna de Vries AM "for service to art as an author and lecturer in Australian and European art history and history"
- Christobel Mattingley AM "for service to literature, particularly children's literature, and for community service through her commitment to social and cultural issues"

=== Lifetime achievement ===
Award	Author
Christopher Brennan Award	Dorothy Hewett
Patrick White Award	Elizabeth Harrower

=== Literary ===
Award	Author	Title	Publisher
The Age Book of the Year Award	Thea Astley	The Multiple Effects of Rainshadow	Viking
ALS Gold Medal	Amanda Lohrey	Camille's Bread	Angus and Robertson
Colin Roderick Award	Tim Flannery, Roger Martin and Alexandra Szalay, Illustrator Peter Schouten	Tree Kangaroos	Reed Publications
Nita Kibble Literary Award	Judy Cassab	Judy Cassab: Diaries	Random House

=== Fiction ===
==== International ====
Award	Category	Author	Title	Publisher
Commonwealth Writers' Prize	Best Novel, SE Asia and South Pacific region	Gillian Mears	The Grass Sister	Random House

==== National ====
Award	Author	Title	Publisher
Adelaide Festival Awards for Literature	Richard Flanagan	Death of a River Guide	McPhee Gribble
The Age Book of the Year Award	Thea Astley	The Multiple Effects of Rainshadow	Viking Press
The Australian/Vogel Literary Award	Bernard Cohen	The Blindman's Hat	Allen and Unwin
Kathleen Mitchell Award	Sonya Hartnett	Sleeping Dogs	Viking Books
Miles Franklin Award	Christopher Koch	Highways to a War	Heinemann
New South Wales Premier's Literary Awards	Sue Woolfe	Leaning Towards Infinity	Random House Australia
Victorian Premier's Literary Awards	Amanda Lohrey	Camille's Bread	Angus and Robertson
Western Australian Premier's Book Awards	Heather Grace	The Lighthouse Spark	Fremantle Arts Centre Press
Western Australian Premier's Book Awards	Dave Warner	City of Light	Fremantle Arts Centre Press

=== Crime and Mystery ===
==== National ====
Award	Category	Author	Title	Publisher
Ned Kelly Award	Novel	Barry Maitland	The Malcontenta	Hamish Hamilton
Ned Kelly Award	Novel	Paul Thomas	Inside Dope	Mandarin Publishing
Ned Kelly Award	First novel	John Dale	Dark Angel	Serpent's Tail
Ned Kelly Award	Lifetime Achievement	Jon Cleary		

=== Children and Young Adult ===
Award	Category	Author	Title	Publisher
Adelaide Festival Awards for Literature	Children's	John Marsden	The Third Day, the Frost	Pan MacMillan
Children's Book of the Year Award	Older Readers	Catherine Jinks	Pagan's Vows	Omnibus Books
Children's Book of the Year Award	Picture Book	Narelle Oliver	The Hunt	Lothian
New South Wales Premier's Literary Awards	Young People's Literature	David Metzenthen	Johnny Hart's Heroes	Penguin Books Australia
Victorian Premier's Prize for Young Adult Fiction		Sonya Hartnett	Sleeping Dogs	Viking Books
Western Australian Premier's Book Awards	Children's and YA	Helen Bell	Idjhil	University of Western Australia Press

=== Science fiction and fantasy ===
Award	Category	Author	Title	Publisher
Aurealis Award	Sf Novel	Greg Egan	Distress	Millenium
Aurealis Award	Sf Short Story	Greg Egan	"Luminous"	Isaac Asimov's SF Magazine Sept 1995
Aurealis Award	Fantasy Novel	Garth Nix	Sabriel	Moonstone/HarperCollins Publishers
Aurealis Award	Fantasy Short Story	Karen Attard	"Harvest Bay"	Eidolon #19 Spring 1995
Aurealis Award	Horror Novel	Terry Dowling	An Intimate Knowledge of the Night	Aphelion
Aurealis Award	Horror Short Story	Francis Payne	"Olympia"	Bambada Press
Aurealis Award	Young Adult Novel	Brian Caswell	Deucalion	University of Queensland Press
Aurealis Award	Young Adult Novel	Garth Nix	Sabriel	Moonstone/HarperCollins Publishers
Aurealis Award	Young Adult Short Story	Not awarded		
Australian SF Achievement Award	Best Australian Long Fiction	Sean McMullen	Mirrorsun Rising	Aphelion
Australian SF Achievement Award	Best Australian Short Fiction	Ian Gunn	"Schrödinger's Fridge"	Aurealis #15

=== Poetry ===
Award	Author	Title	Publisher
Adelaide Festival Awards for Literature	John Kinsella	The Silo: A Pastoral Symphony	Fremantle Arts Centre Press
The Age Book of the Year Award	Eric Beach	Weeping for Lost Babylon	Angus and Robertson
Anne Elder Award	Marcella Polain	Dumbstruck	Five Islands Press
Grace Leven Prize for Poetry	John Kinsella	The Undertow : New and Selected Poems	Arc Publications
Mary Gilmore Award	Jordie Albiston	Nervous Arcs	Spinfex Press
New South Wales Premier's Literary Awards	Eric Beach	Weeping for Lost Babylon	HarperCollins Publishers
New South Wales Premier's Literary Awards	J. S. Harry	Selected Poems	Penguin Books Australia
Victorian Premier's Literary Awards	Peter Bakowski	In the Human Night	Hale and Iremonger
Western Australian Premier's Book Awards	Dorothy Hewett	Collected Poems	Fremantle Arts Centre Press

=== Drama ===
Award	Category	Author	Title
New South Wales Premier's Literary Awards	FilmScript	Ian David	Blue Murder
New South Wales Premier's Literary Awards	Play	John Misto	The Shoe-Horn Sonata
Victorian Premier's Literary Awards	Drama	Joanna Murray-Smith	Honour

=== Non-fiction ===
Award	Category	Author	Title	Publisher
Adelaide Festival Awards for Literature	Non-Fiction	Tim Flannery	The Future Eaters	Reed Books
The Age Book of the Year Award	Non-Fiction	Geoffrey Serle	Robin Boyd : A Life	Miegunyah Press
National Biography Award	Biography	Abraham Biderman	The World of My Past	AHB Publications
New South Wales Premier's Literary Awards	Non-Fiction	Tom Griffiths	Hunters and Collectors: The Antiquarian Imagination in Australia	Cambridge University Press
Victorian Premier's Literary Awards	Non-Fiction	Tom Griffiths	Hunters and Collectors: The Antiquarian Imagination in Australia	Cambridge University Press

== Deaths ==
A list, ordered by date of death (and, if the date is either unspecified or repeated, ordered alphabetically by surname) of deaths in 1996 of Australian literary figures, authors of written works or literature-related individuals follows, including year of birth.

- 12 February — Betty Roland, writer of plays, screenplays, novels, children's books and comics (born 1903)
- 26 March — Godfrey Blunden, journalist and author (died in Paris) (born 1906)
- 23 April — P. L. Travers, children's writer, best known for the Mary Poppins (book series) (born 1899)
- 28 April — Mena Calthorpe, writer (born 1905)
- 27 October — Charlotte Jay, mystery writer and novelist who also wrote under her married name, Geraldine Halls (born 1919)
- 28 November — Hugh V. Clarke, soldier, public servant and author, specialising in military history (born 1919)
- 31 December — John Rowland, public servant, diplomat and poet (born 1925)

== See also ==
- 1996 in Australia
- 1996 in literature
- 1996 in poetry
- List of years in literature
- List of years in Australian literature
