= Resolutions of the People's Consultative Assembly =

The People's Consultative Assembly, the bicameral legislature of Indonesia, passed a series of resolutions of the People's Consultative Assembly (Indonesian: Ketetapan Majelis Permusyawaratan Rakyat) or TAP MPR throughout the 1960s, to the very last issued in 2003.

== List of MPR and MPRS resolutions ==
As between 1960 and 1971 no election for the MPR members happened, the assembly were formed in a provisional measure, known as the Provisional People's Consultative Assembly (Indonesian: Majelis Permusyawaratan Rakyat Republik Sementara Indonesia), which issued TAP MPRs, though there were no difference between the resolutions issued by either by MPRS or MPR.

=== Resolutions of the MPRS, 1960–1968 ===
The beginning of Sukarno's Guided Democracy were marked with the return to the 1945 Constitution, replacing the parliamentary 1950 Provisional Constitution. With it came the formation of Provisional People's Consultative Assembly, which the 1945 constitution prescribed that it consisted of deputies of the House of Representatives, regional representatives (Indonesian: Utusan-utusan Daerah), and sectoral representatives (Indonesian: Utusan-utusan Golongan). Prior to this, in 1955, Indonesia held its first legislative election, and thus the 1955–1960 members of the DPR were popularly elected (which at this point they were considered transitional in nature, until next election). While the PPCA at large served as the primary parliament of the Republic, the House of Representatives was to serve as Presdium of the same in the absence of the Assembly and acting in the fulfillment of the Assembly's legislative powers when it is in recess or not in session.

In March 1960, the DPR unexpectedly rejected President Sukarno's government budget plan. He then proceeded to dissolve the said House and replaced it with the Mutual Assistance House of Representatives (Indonesian: Dewan Perwakilan Rakyat-Gotong Royong), Its members were no longer the previously elected deputies from 1955, but rather the president's appointees, who could be appointed or dismissed by the president's will.

The DPR-GR's deputies would form part of the PPCA when it officially met for its first session days in Bandung in November-December 1960 and began issuing Resolutions with the force of law.

Year	Session	#	Official Title
1960	1st General	I/MPRS/1960	On the Political Manifesto of the Republic of Indonesia as the Official Guidelines of State Policy of the Republic (Note: Political Manifesto of the Republic of Indonesia was President Sukarno's thoughts as stated in his 'Rediscovery of Our Revolution' [Penemuan Kembali Revolusi Kita] speech, which was read in Indonesian Independence Day, 17 August 1959, shortly after the 1959 Decree was proclaimed, that were researched mostly by the Supreme Advisory Council (at the time evolved into a state think tank) as a philosophical guideline for Indonesia, later enacted as an official Guideline of State Policy.)
1960	1st General	II/MPRS/1960	On the Broad Outlines of the First Stage National Overall Planned Development Plan of 1961–1969 (Note: In Indonesian: 'Garis-Garis Besar Pola Pembangunan Nasional Semesta Berencana Tahapan Pertama 1961-1969')
1963	2nd General	III/MPRS/1963	On the Appointment of 'Bung Karno' the Great Leader of Indonesian Revolution as President for Life
1963	2nd General	IV/MPRS/1963	On the Implementation Guidelines of the Guidelines of State and Development Policies
1965	3rd General	V/MPRS/1965	On the Political Mandate of the President/Great Leader of the Revolution/Mandate Holder of the MPRS, titled 'BERDIKARI' (Self-Reliance) as the Confirmation of Indonesian Revolution in Political Affairs, Implementation Guidelines of the Political Manifesto, and the Program Foundation of the Indonesian People's National Revolutionary Struggle
1965	3rd General	VI/MPRS/1965	On the Stance to Stand on Their Own Feet in Economical and Development Affairs
1965	3rd General	VII/MPRS/1965	On Speeches 'GESURI', (Note: short for "Genta Suara Revolusi Indonesia" which literally translates to "the echoes of Indonesian revolution"), 'TAVIP', (Note: short for "Tahun 'Vivere Pericoloso'", which literally translates to "the year of living dangerously". This title was then used as the title of an Australian novel which was then better known to be adapted into a film) 'The Fifth Freedom Is Our Weapon', and 'The Era of Confrontation' as the Guidelines for the Full Implementation of the Political Manifesto of the Republic of Indonesia
1965	3rd General	VIII/MPRS/1965	On the Principles of Consultation in order to reach Consensus in Guided Democracy as Guidelines for Consultative/Representative Bodies
1966	4th General	IX/MPRS/1966	On the Order of the President/Commander-in-Chief of the Armed Forces/Great Leader of the Revolution/Mandate Holder of the MPRS (Note: The president's order referred to the Order of 11 March 1966 [Surat Perintah Sebelas Maret], popularly known by its Indonesian abbreviation 'Supersemar'. The order instructed its holder Gen. Suharto to take all measures deemed necessary to guarantee state and public security, following the 30 September Movement incident. Suharto later used the document to justify the ban on the Indonesian Communist Party and communism teachings, as well as to arrest various cabinet and parliament members. This would lead to the fall of Sukarno and the rise of Suharto to the presidency.)
1966	4th General	X/MPRS/1966	On the Position of All Central and Regional State Institutions as Prescribed by the 1945 Constitution
1966	4th General	XI/MPRS/1966	On the General Election
1966	4th General	XII/MPRS/1966	On the Reconfirmation of Indonesian Foreign Policy
1966	4th General	XIII/MPRS/1966	On the Ampera Cabinet
1966	4th General	XIV/MPRS/1966	On the Formation of Ad Hoc Committees of the MPRS, Tasked with Researching State Institutions, Drafting the State Division of Powers between Various State Institutions According to the 1945 Constitutions, and Drafting the Details on Basic Human Rights
1966	4th General	XV/MPRS/1966	On the Election/Appointment of Vice President, and the Rules on the Appointment of Acting President
1966	4th General	XVI/MPRS/1966	On the Definition of the Mandate Holder of the MPRS
1966	4th General	XVII/MPRS/1966	On the Great Leader of the Revolution
1966	4th General	XVIII/MPRS/1966	On the Review of MPRS Resolution number III/MPRS/1963
1966	4th General	XIX/MPRS/1966	On the Review of State Legislations Not Produced by MPRS, Enacted Not in Accordance to the 1945 Constitution
1966	4th General	XX/MPRS/1966	On the DPR-GR Memorandum on the Source of the Laws of Indonesia and the Hierarchy of Indonesian Legislations
1966	4th General	XXI/MPRS/1966	On the Widest Grants of Regional Autonomy
1966	4th General	XXII/MPRS/1966	On the Parties, Mass Organizations, and Functional Groups
1966	4th General	XXIII/MPRS/1966	On the Renewal of Economic, Financial, and Development Policy Foundation
1966	4th General	XXIV/MPRS/1966	On the Defense/Security Policy
1966	4th General	XXV/MPRS/1966	On the Disbandment of the Communist Party of Indonesia, Its Declaration as a Banned Organization within Indonesian territory, and the Ban to Spread or Develop the Ideology or the Teachings of Communism/Marxism-Leninism
1966	4th General	XXVI/MPRS/1966	On the Formation of Committee to Research the Teachings of Bung Karno the Great Leader of the Revolution
1966	4th General	XXVII/MPRS/1966	On the Subject of Religion, Education, and Culture
1966	4th General	XXVIII/MPRS/1966	On the Policy to Improve Public Welfare
1966	4th General	XXIX/MPRS/1966	On the Award of the Ampera Heroes (Note: 'Ampera Heroes' referred to thirteen individuals who died while protesting against perceived communist-infested government during the final years of the Old Order of Sukarno. They posthumously granted the title 'Ampera Heroes' by MPR, though throughout Suharto's presidency their names and role seemed to be forgotten, nor any law to execute the MPR Resolution were ever enacted. It was only in 2009 through the Honors and Awards Act (UU No. 20/2009) their existence were acknowledged, albeit implicitly, with the inclusion of Ampera Heroes as National Heroes of Indonesia in the elucidation attachment.)
1966	4th General	XXX/MPRS/1966	On the Revocation of Bintang Mahaputera Class III Award from D.N. Aidit
1966	4th General	XXXI/MPRS/1966	On the Prefix Change from “Paduka Yang Mulia” (P.Y.M.), “Yang Mulia” (Y.M.), “Paduka Tuan” (P.T.) (Note: Various forms of 'His Excellency'.) to “Bapak/Ibu” or “Saudara/Saudari” (Note: Various forms of 'Sir/Madam'.)
1966	4th General	XXXII/MPRS/1966	On the Fostering of the Press
1967	Extraordinary	XXXIII/MPRS/1967	On the Revocation of Executive Powers from President Soekarno [sic] (Note: MPR removed Sukarno as President, with Suharto governing as Acting President until next year.)
1967	Extraordinary	XXXIV/MPRS/1967	On the Review of MPRS Resolution number I/MPRS/1960 on the Political Manifesto of the Republic of Indonesia as the Official GSP
1967	Extraordinary	XXXV/MPRS/1967	On the Revocation of MPRS Resolution number XVII/MPRS/1966
1967	Extraordinary	XXXVI/MPRS/1967	On the Revocation of MPRS Resolution number XXVI/MPRS/1966
1968	5th General	XXXVII/MPRS/1968	On the Revocation of MPRS Resolution number VIII/MPRS/1965
1968	5th General	XXXVII/MPRS/1968	On the Revocation of MPRS Resolutions number: (a) II/MPRS/1960, (b) IV/MPRS/1963, (c) V/MPRS/1965, (d) VI/MPRS/1965, and (e) VII/MPRS/1965.
1968	5th General	XXXIX/MPRS/1968	On the Implementation of MPRS Resolution number XIX/MPRS/1966
1968	5th General	XL/MPRS/1968	On the Formation of Ad Hoc Committees of the MPRS, Tasked with Researching Issued Resolutions of the 1966 Fourth Annual Session of the MPRS and the 1967 Special Session of the MPRS
1968	5th General	XLI/MPRS/1968	On the Main Duties of the Development Cabinet
1968	5th General	XLII/MPRS/1968	On the Amendment of MPRS Resolution number XI/MPRS/1966 on the General Election
1968	5th General	XLIII/MPRS/1968	On the Elucidation of MPRS Resolution number IX/MPRS/1966
1968	5th General	XLIV/MPRS/1968	On the Appointment of the Executor of MPRS Resolution number IX/MPRS/1966 as President of the Republic of Indonesia (Note: Suharto was formally elected President by MPR, the first 5-year-term until his resignation on his seventh in 1998.)

=== Resolutions of the MPR, 1973–2003 ===
On 3 July 1971, Indonesian government managed to hold a long-delayed legislative election which had been planned to follow the first election in 1955.

Two years after the election, between 12–24 March 1973, the 920 members of the People's Consultative Assembly, (Note: The assembly no longer carry the prefix 'Provisional'.) which were composed of members of the People's Representative Council, representatives of the armed forces, as well as regional representatives, were able to held the first general session of the MPR in Jakarta, which proceeded to formally elect Suharto as President of Indonesia and Hamengkubuwono IX as Vice President of Indonesia. (Note: First elected vice president of Indonesia since Mohammad Hatta, who resigned from the office in 1956.) As the Speaker of the MPR for this session is Idham Chalid, by this time he also served as concurrent Speaker of the DPR. In total, eleven Resolutions were enacted during 1973 General Session.

The next MPR met in session was during the 1978 General Session of the MPR, formed as result of the 1977 election. Since then, MPR met at least once in every five years, with the speaker of the DPR also serving as the speaker of the MPR.

Sectoral representation to the Assembly was restored in 1984.

Year	Session	#	Official Title
1973	General	I/MPR/1973	On the Rules of Procedure of the MPR
1973	General	II/MPR/1973	On the Rules to Elect the President and Vice President of the Republic of Indonesia
1973	General	III/MPR/1973	On the Accountability of President of the Republic of Indonesia General Soeharto as the Mandate Holder of the MPR
1973	General	IV/MPR/1973	On the Guidelines of State Policy
1973	General	V/MPR/1973	On the Review of MPRS Resolutions
1973	General	VI/MPR/1973	On the Position and Working Relation of the Highest State Institution with/or Between High State Institution
1973	General	VII/MPR/1973	On the Absence from Duty by the President and/or Vice President
1973	General	VIII/MPR/1973	On the General Election
1973	General	IX/MPR/1973	On the Appointment of the President of the Republic of Indonesia
1973	General	X/MPR/1973	On the Delegation of Duties and Authorities to the President/Mandate Holder of the MPR in Implementing Development
1973	General	XI/MPR/1973	On the Appointment of the Vice President of the Republic of Indonesia (Note: Hamengkubuwono IX, the Sultan of Yogyakarta, was elected 2nd Vice President.)
1978	General	I/MPR/1978	On the Rules of Procedure of the MPR
1978	General	II/MPR/1978	On the Guidelines for the Appreciation and Practice of Pancasila (Ekaprasetia Pancakarsa)
1978	General	III/MPR/1978	On the Position and Working Relation of the Highest State Institution with/or Between High State Institution
1978	General	IV/MPR/1978	On the Guidelines of State Policy
1978	General	V/MPR/1978	On the Accountability of President of the Republic of Indonesia Soeharto as the Mandate Holder of the MPR
1978	General	VI/MPR/1978	On the Confirmation of the Territorial Integration of East Timor into the Unitary Republic of Indonesia
1978	General	VII/MPR/1978	On the General Election
1978	General	VIII/MPR/1978	On the Delegation of Duties and Authorities to the President/Mandate Holder of the MPR in Improving and Securing National Development
1978	General	IX/MPR/1978	On the Need to Amend Article 3 of MPR Resolution number V/MPR/1973
1978	General	X/MPR/1978	On the Appointment of the President of the Republic of Indonesia
1978	General	XI/MPR/1978	On the Appointment of the Vice President of the Republic of Indonesia (Note: Due to disillusionment with Suharto's autocracy, Hamengkubuwono IX rejected his vice-presidential nomination. Adam Malik, then the speaker of the MPR, was elected 3rd Vice President and thus resigned.)
1983	General	I/MPR/1983	On the Rules of Procedure of the MPR
1983	General	II/MPR/1983	On the Broad Outlines of State Policy
1983	General	III/MPR/1983	On the General Election
1983	General	IV/MPR/1983	On the Referendum
1983	General	V/MPR/1983	On the Accountability of President of the Republic of Indonesia Soeharto as the Mandate Holder of the MPR, as well as the Confirmation and Award of the Title 'Father of Indonesian Development'
1983	General	VI/MPR/1983	On the Appointment of the President of the Republic of Indonesia
1983	General	VII/MPR/1983	On the Delegation of Duties and Authorities to the President/Mandate Holder of the MPR in Improving and Securing National Development
1983	General	VIII/MPR/1983	On the Appointment of the Vice President of the Republic of Indonesia (Note: Umar Wirahadikusumah, chairman of the Audit Board of Indonesia, was elected 4th Vice President.)
1988	General	I/MPR/1988	On the Amendment and Addendum of MPR Resolution number I/MPR/1983 on the Rules of Procedure of the MPR
1988	General	II/MPR/1988	On the Broad Outlines of State Policy
1988	General	III/MPR/1988	On the General Election
1988	General	IV/MPR/1988	On the Accountability of President of the Republic of Indonesia Soeharto as the Mandate Holder of the MPR
1988	General	V/MPR/1988	On the Appointment of the President of the Republic of Indonesia
1988	General	VI/MPR/1988	On the Delegation of Duties and Authorities to the President/Mandate Holder of the MPR in Improving and Securing National Development
1988	General	VII/MPR/1988	On the Appointment of the Vice President of the Republic of Indonesia (Note: Sudharmono, chairman of the ruling Golkar party, was elected 5th Vice President.)
1993	General	I/MPR/1993	On the Amendment and Addendum of MPR Resolution number I/MPR/1983 on the Rules of Procedure of the MPR, Previously Amended and Added with MPR Resolution number I/MPR/1988
1993	General	II/MPR/1993	On the Broad Outlines of State Policy
1993	General	III/MPR/1993	On the Accountability of President of the Republic of Indonesia Soeharto as the Mandate Holder of the MPR
1993	General	IV/MPR/1993	On the Appointment of the President of the Republic of Indonesia
1993	General	V/MPR/1993	On the Appointment of the Vice President of the Republic of Indonesia (Note: Try Sutrisno, former Commander of the Armed Forces, was nominated by the military ABRI Faction, PDI Faction, and PPP Faction, but not nominated by Suharto or the ruling Golkar party. In order to avoid conflict with the military, Suharto accepted the nomination, and Sutrisno was elected 6th Vice President.)
1998	General	I/MPR/1998	On the Amendment and Addendum of MPR Resolution number I/MPR/1983 on the Rules of Procedure of the MPR, Previously Amended and Added with MPR Resolution number I/MPR/1988 and number I/MPR/1993
1998	General	II/MPR/1998	On the Broad Outlines of State Policy
1998	General	III/MPR/1998	On the Accountability of President of the Republic of Indonesia Soeharto as the Mandate Holder of the MPR
1998	General	IV/MPR/1998	On the Appointment of the President of the Republic of Indonesia
1998	General	V/MPR/1998	On the Assignment of Special Duties and Authorities to the President/Mandate Holder of the MPR in Improving and Securing National Development as the Practice of Pancasila
1998	General	VI/MPR/1998	On the Appointment of the Vice President of the Republic of Indonesia (Note: Bacharuddin Jusuf Habibie, the State Minister of Research and Technology and Chair of Agency for the Assessment and Application of Technology, was elected 7th Vice President.)
1998	Extraordinary	VII/MPR/1998	On the Amendment and Addendum of MPR Resolution number I/MPR/1983 on the Rules of Procedure of the MPR, Previously Amended and Added Multiple Times with Latest Amendment and Addendum in MPR Resolution number I/MPR/1998
1998	Extraordinary	VIII/MPR/1998	On the Revocation of MPR Resolution number IV/MPR/1983 on the Referendum
1998	Extraordinary	IX/MPR/1998	On the Revocation of MPR Resolution number II/MPR/1998 on the Broad Outlines of State Policy
1998	Extraordinary	X/MPR/1998	On the Basics of Development Reform in order to Rescue and Normalize National Livelihood, Implemented as Broad Outlines of State Policy
1998	Extraordinary	XI/MPR/1998	On the Clean Government, Free from Corruption, Collusion, and Nepotism
1998	Extraordinary	XII/MPR/1998	On the Revocation of MPR Resolution number V/MPR/1998 on the Assignment of Special Duties and Authorities to the President/Mandate Holder of the MPR in Improving and Securing National Development as the Practice of Pancasila
1998	Extraordinary	XIII/MPR/1998	On the Limitation of the Term of Office for the President and the Vice President of the Republic of Indonesia
1998	Extraordinary	XIV/MPR/1998	On the Amendment and Addendum of MPR Resolution number III/MPR/1988 on the General Election
1998	Extraordinary	XV/MPR/1998	On the Implementation of Regional Autonomy, the Regulation, Distribution, and Equitable Utilization of National Resources, as well as the Central and Regional Financial Balance Within the Framework of the Unitary Republic of Indonesia
1998	Extraordinary	XVI/MPR/1998	On the Politics of the Economy in order to Achieve Economic Democracy
1998	Extraordinary	XVII/MPR/1998	On the Basic Human Rights
1998	Extraordinary	XVIII/MPR/1998	On the Revocation of MPR Resolution number II/MPR/1978 on the Guidelines for the Appreciation and Practice of Pancasila (Ekaprasetia Pancakarsa), as well as the Confirmation of Pancasila as State Ideology
1999	General	I/MPR/1999	On the Fifth Amendment of the MPR Resolution number I/MPR/1983 on the Rules of Procedure of the MPR
1999	General	II/MPR/1999	On the Rules of Procedure of the MPR
1999	General	III/MPR/1999	On the Accountability of President of the Republic of Indonesia Prof. Dr. Ing. Bacharuddin Jusuf Habibie (Note: President Habibie's accountability speech was rejected by the MPR, and thus he cancelled his nomination for reelection.)
1999	General	IV/MPR/1999	On the 1999-2004 Broad Outlines of State Policy
1999	General	V/MPR/1999	On the Referendum in East Timor
1999	General	VI/MPR/1999	On the Rules for the Nomination and Election of the President and Vice President of the Republic of Indonesia
1999	General	VII/MPR/1999	On the Appointment of the President of the Republic of Indonesia (Note: Abdurrahman Wahid, chairman of the PKB party, managed to form the Central Axis, a coalition of Islamic and secular parties in opposition to Megawati's PDI-P. Following Habibie's withdrawal from the presidential race, Golkar threw their support behind Wahid. Thus, Wahid was elected 4th President of Indonesia.)
1999	General	VIII/MPR/1999	On the Appointment of the Vice President of the Republic of Indonesia (Note: Megawati was endorsed and encouraged to join Wahid as his vice president following the latter's loss in the presidential race. She would be elected 8th Vice President.)
1999	General	IX/MPR/1999	On the Assignment of MPR Working Committee to Proceed with the Amendment of the 1945 Constitution
2000	General	I/MPR/2000	On the First Amendment of MPR Resolution number II/MPR/1999 on the Rules of Procedure of the MPR
2000	General	II/MPR/2000	On the Second Amendment of MPR Resolution number II/MPR/1999 on the Rules of Procedure of the MPR
2000	General	III/MPR/2000	On the Source of Laws and the Hierarchy of Legislations
2000	General	IV/MPR/2000	On the Policy Recommendation in Implementing Regional Autonomy
2000	General	V/MPR/2000	On the Consolidation of National Union and Unity
2000	General	VI/MPR/2000	On the Separation of the Indonesian National Armed Forces and the Indonesian National Police
2000	General	VII/MPR/2000	On the Roles of the Indonesian National Armed Forces and the Indonesian National Police
2000	General	VIII/MPR/2000	On the Annual Report of the High State Institutions for the 2000 Annual Session of the MPR
2000	General	IX/MPR/2000	On the Assignment of MPR Working Committee to Prepare the Amendment Draft of the 1945 Constitution
2001	Extraordinary	I/MPR/2001	On the Position of the MPR Regarding the Presidential Decree of 23 July 2001
2001	Extraordinary	II/MPR/2001	On the Accountability of President of the Republic of Indonesia K.H. Abdurrahman Wahid
2001	Extraordinary	III/MPR/2001	On the Appointment of Vice President Megawati Soekarnoputri as President of the Republic of Indonesia
2001	Extraordinary	IV/MPR/2001	On the Appointment of the Vice President of the Republic of Indonesia (Note: Hamzah Haz, chairman of PPP party, was elected 9th Vice President.)
2001	General	V/MPR/2001	On the Third Amendment of MPR Resolution number 'II/MPR/1999 on the Rules of Procedure of the MPR
2001	General	VI/MPR/2001	On the Ethics of National Livelihood
2001	General	VII/MPR/2001	On the Vision of the Future of Indonesia
2001	General	VIII/MPR/2001	On the Recommendation on the Policy to Eradicate and Prevent Corruption, Collusion, and Nepotism
2001	General	IX/MPR/2001	On the Agrarian Renewal and the Management of Natural Resources
2001	General	X/MPR/2001	On the Implementation Report of the Decision of the MPR by the High State Institutions in the 2001 Annual Session of the MPR
2001	General	XI/MPR/2001	On the Amendment of MPR Resolution number IX/MPR/2000 on the Assignment of MPR Working Committee to Prepare the Amendment Draft of the 1945 Constitution
2002	General	I/MPR/2002	On the Formation of the Constitutional Commission
2002	General	II/MPR/2002	On the Policy Recommendation to Accelerate the National Economy Recovery
2002	General	III/MPR/2002	On the Determination to Implement the 2003 Annual Session of the MPR
2002	General	IV/MPR/2002	On the Revocation of MPR Resolution number VI/MPR/1999 on the Rules for the Nomination and Election of the President and Vice President of the Republic of Indonesia
2002	General	V/MPR/2002	On the Fourth Amendment of MPR Resolution number II/MPR/1999 on the Rules of Procedure of the MPR
2002	General	VI/MPR/2002	On the Recommendation for the Implementation Report of the Decision of the MPR by the President, the Supreme Advisory Council, the People's Representative Council, the Audit Board, and the Supreme Court for the 2002 Annual Session of the MPR
2003	General	I/MPR/2003	On the Material Review and Legal Status Review of MPRS and MPR Resolutions Issued Between 1960 and 2002
2003	General	II/MPR/2003	On the Fifth Amendment of MPR Resolution number II/MPR/1999 on the Rules of Procedure of the MPR

Under Resolution number I/MPR/2003, every MPR and MPRS resolutions enacted prior to this were reviewed in its material value and legal status. The MPR then grouped all 139 remaining resolutions into six categories, as follows:

	Status (in English)	Status (in Indonesian)	No. of Resolutions
Category I	Revoked and void of all legal force	"[...] dicabut dan dinyatakan tidak berlaku."	8
Category II	Remained in effect with conditions	"[...] dinyatakan tetap berlaku dengan ketentuan."	3
Category III	Remained in effect until the formation of the 2004 government	"[...] dinyatakan tetap berlaku sampai dengan terbentuknya Pemerintahan Hasil Pemilu 2004."	8
Category IV	Remained in effect until the enactment of replacement laws	"[...] dinyatakan tetap berlaku sampai dengan terbentuknya Undang-Undang."	11
Category V	Remained in effect until the enactment of new rules of procedure	"[...] masih berlaku sampai dengan ditetapkannya Peraturan Tata Tertib Baru oleh MPR Hasil Pemilu 2004."	5
Category VI	No need for further legal action, either because it is final (einmalig), has been revoked, or has been completed	"[...] tidak perlu dilakukan tindakan hukum lebih lanjut, baik karena bersifat final (einmalig), telah dicabut, maupun telah selesai dilaksanakan."	104
	Total		139

Meanwhile under the following Resolution number II/MPR/2003 on the fifth amendment of the 1999 MPR Rules of Procedure, the assembly renounced its authority to issue further Resolutions and Broad Outlines of State Policy, and limited its authority on seven items, as follows:

- Amend and enact the 1945 Constitution of Indonesia;
- Inaugurate the President and/or Vice President;
- Dismiss the President and/or Vice President within their office term;
- Elect the President/and or Vice President in the event of their office left vacant;
- Amend and enact MPR Rules of Procedure;
- Elect and Inaugurate leaderships of the MPR; and
- Hear the President's accountability speech regarding the government's performance on the 1999-2004 Broad Outlines of State Policy.

== Reformasi period ==
On the 2004 General Session, the MPR heard its last presidential accountability speech. From 2004 onward, president and vice president were directly elected in a general election, and thus MPR lost its power to elect president and vice president, or to decide on a president's accountability. In addition, MPR lost its supremacy over other state institutions and its right as the sole executor of the people's sovereignty, and is also on equal footing as other state institutions, i.e. the President and the Supreme Court.

Under Article 2 and 3 of the Constitution and the 2014 Legislatures Act (Indonesian: Undang-Undang Nomor 17/2004 tentang Majelis Permusyawaratan Rakyat, Dewan Perwakilan Rakyat, Dewan Perwakilan Daerah, dan Dewan Perwakilan Rakyat Daerah), which later amended in 2014, 2018, and 2019, and supplemented by various other laws, authority of the MPR is limited to:

- Amend and enact the Constitution of Indonesia;
- Inaugurate the President-elect and Vice President-elect in a plenary session;
- Remove the President and/or Vice President within their office term, following DPR's articles of impeachment have been found to be proven by the Constitutional Court in a decision, and after the president and/or vice president were given chance to explain their action in a plenary session;
- Inaugurate the vice president as President in the event of the president's death in office, resignation from office, dismissal from office, or unable to perform their duties;
- Elect a vice president from two candidates submitted by the President within sixty days, in the event of the vice-president office were left vacant;
- Elect a president and vice president in the event of both persons left their office vacant at the same time within their office term within thirty days, from a list of two pairs of president- and vice-president-candidate submitted by a political party or a coalition of parties whose presidential pair managed to achieve the most and second-most votes in the previous election, to serve until the end of the office term;
- Enact the MPR Rules of Procedure and MPR Code of Ethics.

Meanwhile, the remaining MPR Resolution were still included within the official Indonesian hierarchy of legislations, only below the Constitution, but above Acts and Government Regulations in-lieu-of Acts.
