= 36th Writers Guild of America Awards =

36th WGA Awards
- Date: 1984
- Organized by: Writers Guild of America, East and the Writers Guild of America, West

The 36th Writers Guild of America Awards honored the best television, and film writers of 1983. Winners were announced in 1984.

== Winners and nominees ==
=== Film ===
Winners are listed first highlighted in boldface.

**Best Drama Written Directly for the Screen**: **Tender Mercies, Written by Horton Foote**; Silkwood, Written by Nora Ephron and Alice Arlen; WarGames, Written by Lawrence Lasker and Walter F. Parkes	**Best Comedy Written Directly for the Screen**: **The Big Chill, Written by Lawrence Kasdan and Barbara Benedek**; Risky Business, Written by Paul Brickman; Zelig, Written by Woody Allen
**Best Drama Adapted from Another Medium**: **Reuben, Reuben, Screenplay by Julius J. Epstein; Based on the novel by Peter De Vries and the play by Herman Shumlin**; The Right Stuff, Screenplay by Philip Kaufman; Based on the book by Tom Wolfe; The Year of Living Dangerously, Screenplay by David Williamson, Peter Weir and C.J. Koch; Based on the novel by C.J. Koch	**Best Comedy Adapted from Another Medium**: **Terms of Endearment, Screenplay by James L. Brooks; Based on the novel by Larry McMurtry**; A Christmas Story, Written by Jean Shepherd, Leigh Brown, and Bob Clark; Based on the novel "In God We Trust, All Other Pay Cash" by Jean Shepherd; To Be or Not to Be, Written by Thomas Meehan and Ronny Graham; Based on the 1942 screenplay by Edwin Justus Mayer and the story of Melchior Lengyel and Ernst Lubitsch

=== Television ===
**Episodic Comedy**: **"Give Me a Ring Sometimes" – Cheers (NBC) – Glen Charles and Les Charles**; **"Boys in the Bar" – Cheers (NBC) – Ken Levine and David Isaacs**; "The Spy Who Came in for a Cold One" – Cheers (NBC) – David Lloyd; "Let Me Count the Ways" – Cheers (NBC) – Heide Perlman; "Goodbye, Farewell, and Amen" – M*A*S*H (CBS) – Alan Alda, Burt Metcalf, John Rappaport, Dan Wilcox, Thad Mumford, Elias Davis, David Pollock and Karen Hall; "Scenskees from a Marriage: Part 1 & 2" – Taxi (NBC) – Howard Gewirtz and Ian Praiser; "Jim's Inheritance" – Taxi (NBC) – Ken Estin	**Episodic Drama**: **"Trial by Fury" – Hill Street Blues (NBC) – David Milch**; "Jane Doe #37" – Cagney & Lacey (CBS) – Peter Lefcourt; "Gung Ho" – Hill Street Blues (NBC) – David Milch, Jeffrey Lewis and Michael Wagner; "Eugene's Comedy Empire Strikes Back" – Hill Street Blues (NBC) – Anthony Yerkovich, David Milch, Karen Hall, Steven Bochco and Jeffrey Lewis; "Addiction" – St. Elsewhere (NBC) – John Masius and Tom Fontana; "Pilot" – Two Marriages (ABC) – Carol Sobieski
**Daytime Serials**: **Ryan's Hope (ABC) – Claire Labine, Mary Munisteri, Paul Avila Mayer and Nancy Fordh**; Capitol – John William Corrington, Joyce Hooper Corrington, Shirley Hartman, Steve Hayes, Susan Goldberg, David Carren, Stephen Karpf, Elinor Karpf, Peggy O'Shea, Craig Carlson, Granville Burgess, Richard Camp and Peggy Sloane	**Adapted Drama Anthology**: **For Us the Living: The Medgar Evers Story (PBS) – Ossie Davis and Ken Rotcop**
**Original/Adapted Comedy Anthology**: **The Other Woman – Lila Garret and Anne Meara**	**Original Drama Anthology**: **Special Bulletin (NBC) – Marshall Herskovitz and Edward Zwick**
**Original/Adapted Multi-Part Long Form Series**: **"Part II" – Blood Feud (OPT) – Robert Boris**; "Part I" – V (NBC) – Kenneth Johnson	**Children's Show**: **"The Woman Who Willed a Miracle" – ABC Afterschool Special (ABC) – Arthur Heinemann**; "Big Bird in China" – Sesame Street (PBS) – Jon Stone and Joseph A. Bailey; "Oh Boy! Babies!" – NBC Special Treat (NBC) – Carole Hart, Bruce Hart and Sherry Coben

=== Special awards ===
Laurel Award for Screenwriting Achievement
**Jack Rose, Melville Shavelson, Melvin Frank, and Norman Panama**
Laurel Award for TV Writing Achievement
**John Gay**
Valentine Davies Award
**Jerome Lawrence, and Robert E. Lee**
Morgan Cox Award
**Nate Monaster**
