= Fat Chance =

Fat Chance may refer to:

- Fat Chance (album), a 2001 album by Paul Heaton
- Fat Chance (Clark novel), a 1996 young adult novel by Margaret Clark
- Fat Chance (film), a 1994 documentary film
- Fat Chance (Newman novel), a 1994 young adult novel by Lesléa Newman
- Fat Chance: Probability from 0 to 1, a 2019 book by Benedict Gross, Joe Harris, and Emily Riehl
- "Fat Chance" (Doctors), a 2005 television episode
