= The Doubleman =

1985 Australian novel by Christopher Koch

- First edition (UK)
- Author: Christopher Koch
- Language: English
- Genre: Novel
- Publisher: Chatto and Windus, England
- Publication date: 1985
- Publication place: Australia
- Media type: Paperback
- Pages: 326pp
- ISBN: 0-7011-2945-X
- OCLC: 12481000
- Preceded by: The Year of Living Dangerously
- Followed by: Highways to a War

The Doubleman (1985) is a novel by Australian author Christopher Koch. It won the Miles Franklin Award in 1985.

== Synopsis ==
Clive Broderick is a guitarist with the electric folk group The Rymers. Richard Miller, the group's producer, was stricken with poliomyelitis as a child and lives in a world of fantasy. And that fantasy may threaten the success of the group.

== Critical reception ==
Veronica Sen in The Canberra Times noted: "Some years ago Koch told interviewer Helen Frizell that the writer must resolve that what he is saying is 'on the side of goodness rather than of evil'. His fascinating, if not always subtle, novel explores individual and social obsession and the appeal of the irrational. Showing the self-indulgence and sterility in much of modern fakelore — cut-price revelation, fame and the manipulation of others — he is undoubtedly on the side of the angels."

== Publishing history ==
After the novel's initial publication by Chatto and Windus in 1985, it was then published as follows:

- McGraw Hill, USA, 1986
- Grafton Books, UK, 1986
- Angus and Robertson, Australia, 1992

and various other paperback editions.

The novel was translated into French (1986), Spanish (1987), Portuguese (1988), and German (1991).

== See also ==
- 1985 in Australian literature
- Middlemiss.org
