= Vivere pericoloso =

Italian phrase meaning "to live dangerously"

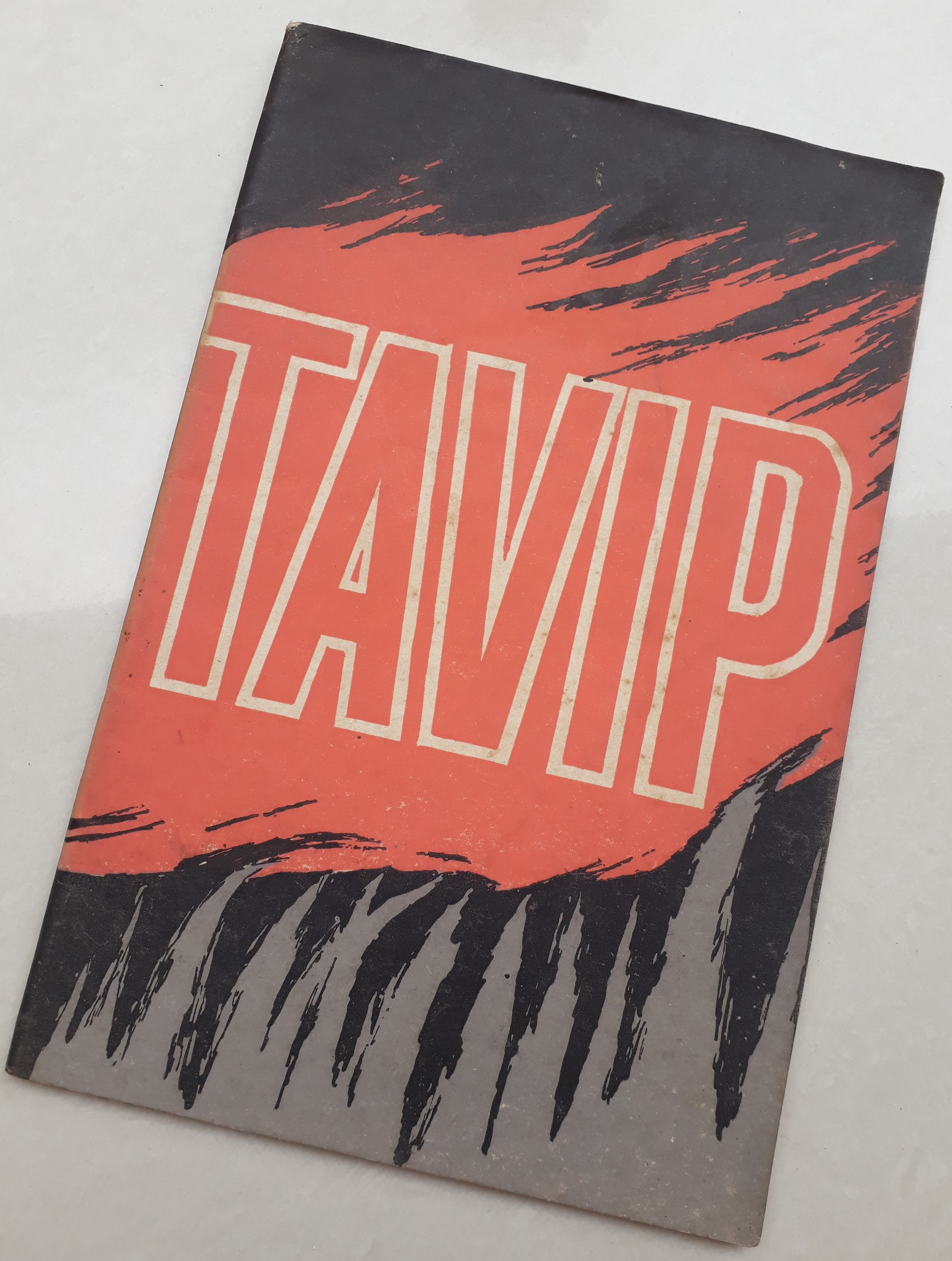
Cover of the government publication of Indonesian President Sukarno's 1964 "Tavip" (Year of Living Dangerously) speech

Vivere pericoloso [ˈviːvere perikoˈloːzo] is broken Italian for vivere pericolosamente ([ˈviːvere perikoˌlozaˈmente]), which in Italian means "to live dangerously".

The phrase was coined by the German philosopher Friedrich Nietzsche in his work published in 1882 "The Gay Science":

For believe me: the secret for harvesting from existence the greatest fruitfulness and the greatest enjoyment is—to live dangerously [German: gefährlich leben]! Build your cities on the slopes of Vesuvius! Send your ships into uncharted seas! Live at war with your peers and yourselves! Be robbers and conquerors as long as you cannot be rulers and possessors, you seekers of knowledge!

In Italy, the phrase became well known due to Benito Mussolini who launched it in August 1924 as a motto of the Fascist Party. At the inaugural session of the National Council of the Fascist Party, he proclaimed:

A German philosopher said: "live dangerously." I would like this to be the motto of young, passionate Italian fascism: "Living dangerously." This must mean being ready for anything, for any sacrifice, for any danger, for any action, when it comes to defending the homeland and fascism. (Note: Italian: "Un filosofo tedesco disse: "vivi pericolosamente". Io vorrei che questo fosse il motto del giovane, passionale fascismo italiano: "Vivere pericolosamente". Ciò deve significare essere pronti a tutto, a qualsiasi sacrificio, a qualsiasi pericolo, a qualsiasi azione, quando si tratti di difendere la patria e il fascismo".)

In Indonesia, this phrase was popularized by Indonesia's first president Sukarno in 1964 when his state address on the 19th anniversary of the nation's independence was entitled Tahun Vivere Pericoloso (lit. 'The Year of Living Dangerously', abbreviated as Tavip), roughly a year before the coup attempt by the 30 September Movement.

The title of the address inspired Christopher Koch, an Australian author, to write a novel published in 1978 titled The Year of Living Dangerously, which was then made into a film with the same title. The 1982 film starring Mel Gibson, Sigourney Weaver and Linda Hunt tells the story of the events in Jakarta before and after the 30 September Movement launched its action.

The phrase was later used by the newspaper Sinar Harapan as a title of its critic corner.
