= Boston Society of Film Critics Awards 1983 =

Annual US film awards ceremony

4th BSFC Awards

January 29, 1984

Best Film:
The Night of
the Shooting Stars

The 4th Boston Society of Film Critics Awards honored the best filmmaking of 1983. The awards were given on 29 January 1984.

== Winners ==
- Best Film:
  - The Night of the Shooting Stars (La notte di San Lorenzo)
- Best Actor:
  - Eric Roberts – Star 80
- Best Actress:
  - Rosanna Arquette – Baby It's You
- Best Supporting Actor:
  - Jack Nicholson – Terms of Endearment
- Best Supporting Actress:
  - Linda Hunt – The Year of Living Dangerously
- Best Director:
  - Paolo and Vittorio Taviani – The Night of the Shooting Stars (La notte di San Lorenzo)
- Best Screenplay:
  - Éric Rohmer – Pauline at the Beach (Pauline à la plage)
- Best Cinematography:
  - Hiro Narita – Never Cry Wolf
- Best Documentary:
  - Say Amen, Somebody
- Best American Film:
  - Terms of Endearment
