= The Multiple Effects of Rainshadow =

Novel by Thea Astley

- First edition
- Author: Thea Astley
- Language: English
- Publisher: Viking Press, Australia
- Publication date: 1996
- Publication place: Australia
- Media type: Print (Hardback & Paperback)
- Pages: 296 pp
- Preceded by: Coda
- Followed by: Drylands

The Multiple Effects of Rainshadow (1996) is Thea Astley's second to last novel. It won The Age Book of the Year in 1996, and was shortlisted for the 1997 Miles Franklin Award.

== Plot summary ==
The novel is based on a violent event that took place on Palm Island, Queensland (called Doebin in the novel) in 1930, in which the white Superintendent of the settlement, Robert Curry (Brodie in the novel), ran amok, setting fire to buildings and killing his own children in the process. He was eventually shot dead by one of the indigenous inhabitants, Peter Prior (Manny Cooktown in the novel), under orders from the white deputy Superintendent. Astley focuses most of the novel on various white characters who were present on the Island at the time, but intersperses their experiences with briefer passages spoken by the Aboriginal man, Manny Cooktown.

The novel spans a long time period, from 1918 when the settlement was established to 1957 when Aboriginal workers went on a strike, but most of the action takes place after 1930.

== Themes ==
Sheridan writes that "the novel underlines the grim repetitions of colonial oppression but also the endurance and resilience of the Aboriginal characters".

== Style ==
It is a multiple point of view novel, with some voices being first person and the rest third person. It's important to note that most of the characters are invented, and all of the names have been changed. The prime narrator is Manny Cooktown: he starts the novel and appears between the various voices providing a commentary on what is happening on the Island as the novel progresses, but he does not conclude the novel. The final voice is authorial.

== Awards and nominations ==
- 1996 The Age Book of the Year, winner
- 1997 Miles Franklin Award, shortlisted

== See also ==
- 1996 in Australian literature
- Dale, Leigh (1999, May) "Colonial History and Post-Colonial Fiction: The Writing of Thea Astley" in Australian Literary Studies
