= Highways to a War =

1995 novel by Christopher Koch

- First edition (Australia)
- Author: Christopher Koch
- Language: English
- Genre: Novel
- Publisher: Heinemann, Australia; Viking Press (US)
- Publication date: 1995
- Publication place: Australia
- Media type: Print Hardback & Paperback
- Pages: 450
- ISBN: 0-85561-642-3
- OCLC: 31076382
- Preceded by: The Doubleman
- Followed by: Out of Ireland

Highways to a War is a Miles Franklin Award-winning novel by Australian author Christopher Koch.

In an interview in 2000, Koch noted that this novel, and his later work Out of Ireland, formed a diptych called Beware of the Past.

== Plot summary ==
When legendary Australian war photographer Mike Langford goes missing in Khmer Rouge Cambodia in 1976, childhood friend Ray inherits his taped diaries. Using these, his own memories, and the recollections and records of others, Ray attempts to reconstruct Langford's life, to understand how he became a myth and why he went back into Cambodia. Eventually this will lead Ray to Thailand, to the Cambodian border and the truth about Langford's fate.

Though different parts of Highways to a War are told from different perspectives, the overall result is a coherent narrative and a portrait of a life. It begins with Langford's childhood on a Tasmanian farm, his "novitiate" in Singapore, where he nearly starves before finding work, and his early experiences in Vietnam, in Saigon and in the Mekong Delta with the ARVN, the South Vietnamese army. The story then jumps from Saigon in 1966 to Phnom Penh in 1973. Among other dramatic episodes, Langford is captured by North Vietnamese troops and witnesses the fall of Saigon. The story is tense and gripping, but the centre remains Langford's development: he is a tough man, a survivor, but he is also an idealist and, when he loses his objectivity and becomes involved with the Free Khmer, his fate has a tragic inevitability to it.

Its unity comes from its focus on Langford, but Highways to a War has plenty of other memorable characters. His fellow photographers and correspondents are a fascinatingly idiosyncratic bunch. And Langford's romantic idealisation of women makes them a key part of his life: in Australia, the daughter of a poor fruit-picking family and then the wife of his mentor, in Saigon an older French-Vietnamese woman, and in Phnom Penh the Cambodian woman whose fate becomes tied up with Langford's.

Highways to a War also offers a vivid perspective on the course of the Second Indochina War. This, however, is implicit: Koch makes no attempt to write a history of that war (and readers without any background knowledge may find parts of the novel confusing), or to take sides in the debates over that history, and it is through personal stories and personal tragedies that he sheds light on the broader tragedies.

== Awards ==
Highways to a War won the 1996 Miles Franklin Award, where the Judging Panel wrote, "it is really a novel about loss. Mike Langford's early Tasmanian experience has shaped his character and he carries his haunted past everywhere with him."

== Publication history ==
After the novel's initial publication in 1995 by Viking in USA and Heinemann in Australia and the UK it was republished as follows:

- 1996 Penguin, USA
- 1996 Minerva, Australia
- 1999 Vintage Books, Australia
- 2012 HarperCollins, Australia

The novel was also translated into German in 1997, French in 2001, and Chinese in 2010.

== See also ==
- 1995 in Australian literature
- Middlemiss.org
