= Weeping for Lost Babylon =

1996 Australian poetry collection by Eric Beach

- Author: Eric Beach
- Language: English
- Genre: Poetry collection
- Publisher: Angus and Robertson
- Publication date: 1996
- Publication place: Australia
- Media type: Print
- Pages: 152 pp
- Awards: 1996 The Age Book of the Year Award for Poetry, winner; 1996 New South Wales Premier's Literary Award for Poetry, co-winner
- ISBN: 0207186251

Weeping for Lost Babylon is a collection of poems by Australian poet Eric Beach, published by Angus and Robertson in 1996.

The collection contains 98 poems, from a variety of sources.

It was the winner of the 1996 The Age Book of the Year Award for Poetry, and co-winner of the 1996 New South Wales Premier's Literary Award for Poetry.

== Contents ==
- "Basho's Autobiography"
- "A Tale of 2 Dragons"
- "A Giant is Coming"
- "You Never did Give that Much Away"
- "Painting - Man and Woman"
- "No Wild Rain"
- "In My Garden Blood and Bone"
- "Flamenco"
- "Five Seasons"
- "& th Tune Through It All Like th Rain"
- "Tears"
- "Paying Out (for Bob Harris)"
- "Give Me Your Solemn Hand, Friend",
- "Clean Bomb"
- "Dear Mum"
- "Living in a Home"
- "Downs Syndrome"
- "Visiting Lecturer on th Disabled"
- "Lost in Her Head"
- "Hollowcourt Centre for Intellectually Disabled Adults"
- "Th File on Stephanie"
- "Not Normal Intelligence (for and after Scott Weston)"
- "Handicap"
- "Poetry Puppets"
- "Once Was Always"
- "Mum's Diary"
- "We Don't Talk Sex, Religion, nor Politics"
- "How I Became a Poet"
- "Grow Parsley & You'll Have Many Children"
- "Beachy's Birdproof Fences"
- "Old Man at Raglan"
- "Hangi (for Tui Junior)"
- "Bees (for George Frederick Robson Gordon)"
- "Hands"
- "Insomnia"
- "Cat a Strophe"
- "Auditory Hallucinations"
- "Dinosaur"
- "Magnolia"
- "Knowledge a Young Wife Should Have (1905)"
- "That's It, We've Had It, Again"
- "A Box of Knives"
- "West Coast Perambulation"
- "A Map of Australia"
- "Aristocrat"
- "In th Desert You Remember"
- "Wimmera Roadsong"
- "Head-Waters, Heart-Timbers"
- "Now Erotica's Veronica"
- "Being Erotic"
- "Chaos Theory"
- "Evolution"
- "To a Fellow-Traveller"
- "Escapist Fiction"
- "Motoring th Post-Modernist Way"
- "Once I Spat on a Statue"
- "I Hate Poetry"
- "Talking to a Prisoner"
- "Salute th Officer (for Archibald Baxter)"
- "East Timor Street"
- "Emus Out of Genoa"
- "Let's Drive"
- "In th 50's"
- "In th 60's"
- "In th 70's"
- "Talkback"
- "Unaware of Your Indifference"
- "Radio Teeth"
- "Carnal Love"
- "I Want to Be Normal"
- "Watching My Ant Farm"
- "Opportunity Shop"
- "Losing Poems"
- "Fame"
- "This Woman is Crying"
- "Slow Windmills (In Memoriam Scott Weston)"
- "Port Arthur"
- "A Good Night Out"
- "Lune River"
- "Old Shed"
- "Orator"
- "Exile"
- "Complaints of Tiberius"
- "Translator"
- "Barefoot on a Beach of Shells"
- "Grief House (for Gwen)"
- "Weeping for Lost Babylon"
- "Gateway"
- "Long Distance"
- "I Didn't Believe It"
- "A Scrapbook of the Sun"
- "Phone-Call from Mal"
- "Somebody I Scarcely Know"
- "Letter from Lauren"
- "News of a Suicide"
- "Last Time I Met Him"
- "I Can Bear th Weight"
- "A Mosaic Grief"

== Critical reception ==
In The Sydney Morning Herald reviewer Heather Cam noted that this collection is "imbued with sadness", and pointed out that "the title sequence is an elegy for his dead son."

== See also ==
- 1996 in Australian literature
