= Leaning Towards Infinity =

1996 novel by Australian author Sue Woolfe

- Author: Sue Woolfe
- Language: English
- Genre: Literary novel
- Publisher: Vintage Australia
- Publication date: 1996
- Publication place: Australia
- Media type: Print
- Pages: 393 pp.
- Awards: 1996 New South Wales Premier's Literary Awards — Christina Stead Prize for Fiction, winner
- ISBN: 0091832284

Leaning Towards Infinity : How My Mother's Apron Unfolds Into My Life is a 1996 novel by the Australian author Sue Woolfe.

It was the winner of the 1996 New South Wales Premier's Literary Awards, and the winner of the 1997 Commonwealth Writers' Prize for the South East Asia and South Pacific region.

== Synopsis ==
The story of the novel centres around three generations of women: Hypatia, who writes about her famous mathematician mother Francis, who discovered a new kind of number, and about Juanita, mother to Francis, and herself a mathematician, though unknown.

== Critical reception ==
Kirkus Reviews gave the novel a positive review: "Creating the feeling of a found document, prizewinning Australian writer Woolfe pieces together an intriguing and expansive novel of ideas—showing the ways in which love, motherhood, and mathematics wrap around the human soul...A lovely novel, magical in its elevation of mathematics into a realm of divine beauty, charming in its depiction of the equally demanding sphere of motherhood."

In The Sydney Morning Herald reviewer Rosemary Sorensen called the novel a "startingly modern book, balancing, in her case, an undermining of narrative authority against the urgency of a topic that has been waiting for quite some time to be done as well as this."

== Awards ==
- 1996 New South Wales Premier's Literary Awards, winner
- 1997 Commonwealth Writers' Prize – South East Asia and South Pacific Region, winner

== Publication history ==
After the novel's initial publication in 1996 in Australia by Vintage Australia, it was reprinted as follows:

- Women's Press, UK, 1998 & 2000
- Faber & Faber, UK, 1998
- Vintage Australia, Australia, 1999
- Wutheringink, Australia, 2013
- Untapped, Australia, 2021 & 2022

The novel was also translated into Dutch in 1997, and French in 2003.

== Notes ==
- Dedication: To Gordon who leans towards infinity every now and then.

== See also ==
- 1996 in Australian literature
