= Subhuman Redneck Poems =

1996 poetry collection by Les Murray

- Author: Les Murray
- Language: English
- Genre: Poetry collection
- Publisher: Duffy and Snellgrove
- Publication date: 1996
- Publication place: Australia
- Media type: Print
- Pages: 104 pp.
- Awards: 1997 winner Victorian Premier's Literary Awards — Prize for Poetry
- ISBN: 1875989080

Subhuman Redneck Poems is a collection of poems by Australian writer Les Murray, published by Duffy and Snellgrove in 1996.

The collection contains 66 poems which were published in a variety of original publications, with some being published here for the first time.

== Contents ==
- "The Family Farmers' Victory"
- "A Brief History"
- "Where Humans Can't Leave and Mustn't Complain"
- "Green Rose Tan"
- "The Say-But-the-Word Centurion Attempts a Summary"
- "Dead Trees in the DamiC
- "Rock Music"
- "The Rollover"
- "Late Summer Fires"
- "Corniche"
- "Suspended Vessels"
- "The Water Column"
- "The Beneficiaries"
- "The Maenads"
- "The Portrait Head"
- "Phrygia, Birthplace of Embroidery"
- "Like Wheeling Stacked Water"
- "Wallis Lake Estuary"
- "Twin Towns History"
- "The Sand Dingoes"
- "On Home Beaches"
- "Leash Chain"
- "From Bennett's Head"
- "The Bohemian Occupation"
- "The Fossil Imprint"
- "On the Present Slaughter of Feral Animals"
- "Memories of the Height-to-Weight Ratio"
- "Water-Gardening in an Old Farm Dam"
- "The Suspension of Knock"
- "It Allows a Portrait in Line-Scan at Fifteen"
- "Performance"
- "War Song"
- "Australian Love Poem"
- "Inside Ayers Rock"
- "Each Morning Once More Seamless"
- "Contested Landscape at Forsayth"
- "The Shield-Scales of Heraldry"
- "The Year of the Kiln Portraits"
- "A Stage of Gentrification"
- "Earth Tremor at Night"
- "Waking Up on Tour"
- "Tympan Alley"
- "A Lego of Driving to Sydney"
- "Burning Want"
- "For the Sydney Jewish Museum : And Peter Wagner"
- "The Last Hellos"
- "Opening in England"
- "My Ancestress and the Secret Ballot : 1848 and 1851"
- "Comete"
- "Dry Water"
- "Life Cycle of Ideas"
- "Cotton Flannelette"
- "The Trances"
- "The Devil"
- "The Nearly Departed"
- "The Warm Rain"
- "For Helen Darville"
- "Demo"
- "Deaf Language"
- "Reverse Light"
- "The Genetic Galaxy"
- "Blowfly Grass"
- "Dreambabwe"
- "Below Bronte House"
- "The Head-Spider"
- "Under the Banana Mountains"

== Critical reception ==
Writing in the Independent (UK) William Scammell noted: "If you like your politics in black and white, or Left and Right, Les Murray might be filed away, in his latest incarnation, as a reactionary mystic nationalist - an Australian Solzhenitsyn, perhaps - who babbles about God while sniping at the multicultural facts of modern life and smearing liberals with responsibility for half the horrors of the 20th century."

== Awards ==
- 1996 winner T. S. Eliot Prize
- 1997 winner Victorian Premier's Literary Awards — Prize for Poetry
- 1997 Kenneth Slessor Prize for Poetry, shortlisted

== See also ==
- 1996 in Australian literature

== Notes ==
- Tony Stephens interviewed the author about this collection for The Sydney Morning Herald.
