= Paul Thomas (writer) =

New Zealand writer (born 1951)

Paul Thomas (born 1951) is a New Zealand novelist, journalist, sports biographer and scriptwriter. He has been described as 'the Godfather of New Zealand crime fiction.'

== Life and work ==
Thomas was born in Harrogate, United Kingdom, and attended the University of Auckland.

Thomas' novels are set primarily in Australia and New Zealand, and often also in France, where he spent several years in Toulouse. He is known for his humorous writing style, especially in the novels featuring Tito Ihaka, a Māori detective in Auckland. The Ihaka novels also draw a panoramic view of the contemporary society in Auckland.

While Thomas' earlier work consists primarily of crime and sports novels, his recent books explore the psychological state-of-mind of middle-aged urban people at the beginning of the new century.

Inside Dope (German title: Transfer) and Dirty Laundry (Schmutzige Wäsche) have been translated and published in German.

Thomas is a sports and current affairs columnist for the New Zealand Listener.

== Awards ==
- Ned Kelly Award for Best Crime Novel: Inside Dope (1995)
- Ngaio Marsh Award for Best Crime Novel: Death on Demand (2013)

== Bibliography ==
=== Tito Ihaka Novels ===
The Ihaka character was adapted for the 2001 TV Movie Ihaka: Blunt Instrument starring Temuera Morrison.

- Old School Tie (1994) (aka Dirty Laundry)
- Inside Dope (1995)
- Guerilla Season (1996)
- Death on Demand (2012)
- Fallout (2014)

=== Other novels ===
- Star Struck (1999–2000)
- Final Cut (1999)
- The Empty Bed (2002)
- Work in Progress (2006)

=== Short story collections ===
- Sex Crimes (2003)
