= Sue Woolfe =

Australian author (born 1950)

- Born: 15 November 1950 (age 75); Sydney, New South Wales, Australia
- Occupation: Novelist
- Writing career
- Notable awards: 1996 New South Wales Premier's Literary Awards — Christina Stead Prize for Fiction, winner

Sue Woolfe (born 15 November 1950) is an Australian author, teacher, scriptwriter, editor and documentary film-maker.

== Biography ==
Woolfe was raised in the Blue Mountains west of Sydney and completed tertiary studies at the University of Sydney and the University of New England.

Her first novel, Painted Woman, was runner-up in the ABC Bicentennial Awards. Later she adapted the novel for stage and radio.

She was awarded a Doctorate of Creative Arts by the University of Technology Sydney in 2005.

== Bibliography ==
- Woolfe, Sue. About Literature.
- Woolfe, Sue (1975). Language in Literature. South Melbourne, Vic: Macmillan. ISBN 978-0-333-17558-3.
- Woolfe, Sue (1976). Briga. South Melbourne, Vic: Macmillan.
- Wolfe, Sue (1989). Painted Woman. North Sydney, NSW: Allen & Unwin. Also published in France, 2009
- Kate Grenville and, Sue Woolfe (1993). Making Stories: How Ten Australian Novels were Written. North Sydney: Allen and Unwin. ISBN 978-1-86508-613-2.
- Woolfe, Sue (1996). Leaning Towards Infinity : how my mother's apron unfolds into my life. Boston: Faber & Faber. pp. Also published in France, Holland and the UK. Woolfe adapted the novel for the professional stage, and it was produced by TheENsemble, Sydney, in 1998.
- Woolfe, Sue (1999). Wild Minds: Stories Of Outsiders And Dreamers. Milsons Point, N.S.W.; New York: Random House.
- Woolfe, Sue (2003). The Secret Cure. Sydney: Picador. ISBN 0-330-36436-7.Republished 2009 by University of Western Australia Press.
- Woolfe, Sue (2007). The Mystery of the Cleaning Lady: A Writer Looks Creativity and Neuroscience. University of Western Australia Press. ISBN 978-1-920694-96-8.
- Woolfe, Sue (2012). The Oldest Song in the World. Sydney: Harper Collins. ISBN 978-0-7322-9499-1.

== Awards and nominations ==
Woolfe won the 1996 New South Wales Premier's Literary Awards, Christina Stead Prize for fiction for Leaning Towards Infinity, which was shortlisted for the US TipTree Prize, and for the Commonwealth Prize, the winner in the Pacific- Asia region, and listed among the top for novels for final prize.

Woolfe received grants from the Literature Board of the Australia Council, from 1994 to 2015.
