= The Black Sequin Dress =

1996 play written by Jenny Kemp

- Cover of published edition
- Original language: English
- Written by: Jenny Kemp
- Setting: A nightclub

Premiere
- Date: March 5, 1996
- Place: Adelaide Festival

The Black Sequin Dress is a play by Australian playwright Jenny Kemp.

== Plot ==
A woman leaves her children for an evening to go to a nightclub. In a moment of indecision she glances back, slips and falls. Money, desire and dreams converge as she enters a surreal world of haunting colours and lyrical distortions.

== Premiere and cast ==
The Black Sequin Dress was commissioned for the 1996 Adelaide Festival, where the Playbox Theatre Centre premiered it on 5 March 1996 with the following cast:

- Woman 1: Margaret Mills
- Woman 2: Helen Herbertson
- Woman 3: Natasha Herbert
- Woman 4: Mary Sitarenos
- Man: Ian Scott
- Waiter: Greg Stone
- Girl's voice: Romanie Harper
- Director, Jenny Kemp
- Composer, Elizabeth Drake
- Designer, Jacqueline Everitt
- Lighting designer, Ben Cobham

== Publication ==
The play was published by Currency Press in 1996.
