= Jenny Kemp (playwright) =

Australian director and writer (born 1949)

Jenny Kemp is an Australian theatre director and writer.

== Career ==
The daughter of artist Roger Kemp, Kemp trained for one year at the National Institute of Dramatic Art. She next worked in experimental theatre in England before returning to Melbourne, where she attended a five-month workshop with Rowena Balos. She next joined Rob Meldrum in the Stasis Group, an alternative theatre company, at The Pram Factory.

Kemp directed student productions at the Rusden College of Advanced Education and went on to teach at the Victorian College of the Arts. She has been an honorary research associate at Monash University and has received an Australia Council for the Arts fellowship.

Her texts are often inspired by the visual art of Belgian painter Paul Delvaux.

She has worked with Melbourne Theatre Company, the State Theatre Company of South Australia, Malthouse Theatre, the Australian Performing Group, Playbox Theatre and Belvoir St Theatre. She is writer and artistic director for Black Sequin Productions.

== Awards ==
Kemp has been awarded the Kenneth Myer Medallion for the Performing Arts and Green Room Awards for her work as a director and for her collaboration in dance.

== Selected works ==
- Goodnight Sweet Dreams (1986)
- Call of the Wild (1989)
- Remember (1992)
- The Black Sequin Dress (1996)
- Still Angela (2002)
- Kitten (2008)
- Madeleine (2010)
