= Marcella Polain =

Australian poet and writer

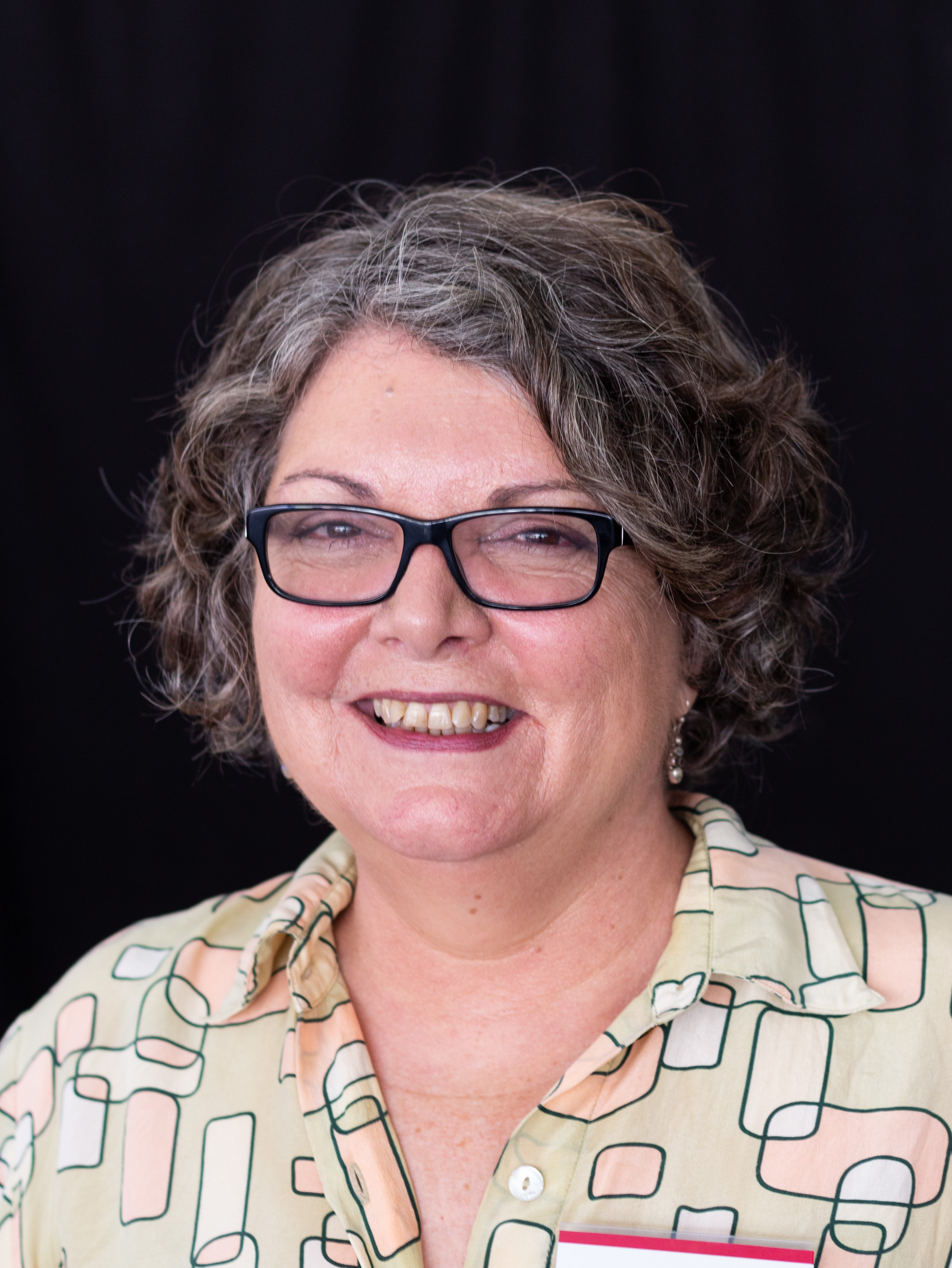
- Polain at Perth Festival Writers Week in 2019
- Born: 1958 (age 67–68); Singapore
- Occupations: Poet and writer

Marcella Polain (born 1958) is an Australian-resident poet, novelist and short fiction writer.

== Early life and education ==
Marcella Polain was born in Singapore and migrated to Australia at the age of two with her Irish father and Armenian mother.

Polain studied Literature and Creative Arts at Western Australian Institute of Technology (now Curtin University). For a short while she attended the Australian Film, Television and Radio School in Sydney. At Western Australian Secondary Teachers' College (now Edith Cowan University), she took a Post Graduate Diploma in Secondary Education. Polain completed a PhD at the University of Western Australia.

== Career ==
Polain entered the Perth poetry scene in the early 1990s. She was a founding member (along with Morgan Yasbincek, Julia Lawrinson, Tracy Ryan and Sarah French) of Perth's WEB women's readings, which brought guests such as Dorothy Porter and Gig Ryan to Perth. She has been poetry editor for the literary magazines Westerly, Blue Dog, and co-edited Australian Poetry Journal Vol.11 2024 with poet Andy Jackson. She tutored in Writing for 10 years at Murdoch University and University of Western Australia before becoming Senior Lecturer at Edith Cowan University.

Her first novel, The Edge of the World, based on her family's survival of the Armenian genocide, won the University of Western Australia's Higher Degree by Research Prize for Publications, and was nominated for the 2008 Commonwealth Writers' Prize Regional best first book award.

Her poetry has been published internationally and in translation. She has been a recipient of an Australia Council Grant for New Work of Fiction, which resulted in the publication of Driving into the Sun (2019). In 2012, at Edith Cowan University and with visual artist Paul Uhlmann, she co-founded the micropress 'fold editions', dedicated to the creation of hand-made books. She has also worked interdisciplinarily with composer-musicians, dancer-choreographers and other visual artists.

In April 2015, the Armenian translation of The Edge of the World was launched in Yerevan at the Centenary Commemoration of the Armenian Genocide, also part of the Global Conference Against Genocide. In 2015, Polain was also awarded the International Grand Prize for Poetry by the Academia Orient Occident.

== Books ==
=== Poetry ===
- Dumbstruck (1996) Five Islands Press
- Each Clear Night (2000) Five Islands Press
- Therapy Like Fish: new and selected poems (2008) John Leonard Press
- the seven-eight count of unstoppable sadness (2023) Puncher and Wattmann

=== Novels ===
- The Edge of the World (2007) Fremantle Press
- La marginea lumii (The Edge of the World) (2012) Romanian translation by Sergiu Selian. Ararat
- Armenian translation of The Edge of the World, translated by Aram Arsenyan, edited by Aram Arkun. Apollon
- Driving into the Sun (2019) Fremantle Press

=== Short fiction ===
- "Skin" in Westerly (December 2005)
- "Sleep without Cameras" in Westerly (December 2010)
- "Beautiful Negatives" in The Kid on the Karaoke Stage and other stories ed Georgia Richter. (2011) Fremantle Press
- "A Calf is an Animal" in Westerly (December 2012)
- "Curtain Man" in Antithesis (2013)

== Honours and awards ==
- Anne Elder Prize for "Dumbstruck" 1996
- Short-listing of "Each Clear Night" WA Premiers Poetry Award 2000
- Patricia Hackett Prize for "Skin" in Westerly 2005
- University of Western Australia's Creative Works Publication Prize 2007
- Shortlisting of "The Edge of the World" for the Commonwealth Writers Prize for First Book 2007
- Short-listing of "Therapy like Fish: new and selected poems" ACT Judith Wright Prize 2008
- Patricia Hackett Prize for "Sleep without Cameras" Westerly Dec 2010
- Long listing of "The Stubborn Murmur: The Armenian Genocide and After" in the Calibre Essay Prize 2010
- Australia Council Grant for Established Writers, New Work, Fiction, 2010–2011
- International Grand Prize for Poetry, Academia Orient-Occident, Romania, 2015
- Gold Medal, Writers' Union of Armenia, 2015
- Long listing of Driving into the Sun in ALS Gold Medal 2020
