= Camille's Bread =

1995 novel by Australian author Amanda Lohrey

- Author: Amanda Lohrey
- Language: English
- Genre: Novel
- Publisher: Angus and Robertson
- Publication date: 1995
- Publication place: Australia
- Media type: Print
- Pages: 277 pp.
- Awards: 1996 ALS Gold Medal winner
- ISBN: 0207188432
- Preceded by: The Reading Group
- Followed by: The Philosopher's Doll

Camille's Bread (1995) is a novel by Australian writer Amanda Lohrey. It was originally published by Angus and Robertson in Australia in 1995.

== Synopsis ==
Narita is a single-mother of Camille, living in Sydney, when she meets Stephen, a public servant who is seeking a change of lifestyle.

== Publishing history ==
After its initial publication in Australia by Angus and Robertson in 1995, the novel was reprinted by the same company in 1996.

== Epigraph ==
- Epigraph: "The child's first decision, noted Freud, is whether to swallow it or spit it out."

== Critical reception ==
Writing in The Sydney Morning Herald reviewer Morag Fraser commented: "Amanda Lohrey's Camille's Bread is all domestic interiors and friction over ritual." She then went on to note that "..random riches at the novel's edges make you speculate that Lohrey has other novels in her that will prove riskier and more grand."

In The Age Lyn McCredden wrote: "It is the sheer glory of the novel that its understated humor and subtle neo-realism deliver a feast of contemporary vignettes and characters. Each scene totters deliciously on the brink of farce but is pulled back into the narrative."

== Awards ==
- 1996 ALS Gold Medal winner
- 1996 Victorian Premier's Prize for Fiction winner
- 1996 Miles Franklin Award, shortlisted

== See also ==
- After her Victorian Premier's Prize for Fiction win in 1996, Lohrey spoke to Jason Steger of The Age.
- The Age newspaper published a short excerpt from the novel
- 1995 in Australian literature
