= Margaret Clark (Australian writer) =

Australian children's author

- Born: Margaret Dianne Clark; 1942 (age 83–84); Geelong, Australia
- Occupation: Author
- Children: Stewart and Fiona
- Writing career
- Genres: Children's fiction, teen fiction
- Notable work: Fat Chance
- Website: www.margaretclark.com

Margaret Dianne Clark (born 1942) is an Australian children's author, using M.D. Clark and Lee Striker as pseudonyms. Some of her most famous works are the Aussie Angels series and the young adult novel Fat Chance.

== Biography ==
Clark holds a Bachelor of Education, a Master of Education, a Doctorate of Education, and has written over one hundred books concerning young people and making and keeping friends, sibling rivalry, school environments, and social issues, using variations of her name Margaret Clark, M.D.Clark, Margaret D Clark and the pseudonym Lee Striker.

== Bibliography ==
=== Aussie Angels series ===
1. Okay Koala (Bolinda Audio Books 2001); ISBN 978-1-74030-369-9
2. Whale of a Time (Bolinda Audio Books, Australia, 2000); ISBN 978-1-74030-369-9
3. Seal with a Kiss (2012); ISBN 978-1-74030-476-4
4. Hello, Possum! (Hodder Headline, 2012); ISBN 978-1-74030-733-8
5. Wannabe Wallaby (Bolinda Audio Books, 2002); ISBN 978-1-74030-738-3
6. Cocky Too (Bolinda Audio Books, 2003); ISBN 978-1-74030-795-6
7. Sheila the Heeler (Hodder Headline Australia, 2000); ISBN 978-0-7336-1212-1,
8. A Horse, of Course (Hodder Headline, 2001); ISBN 978-0-7336-1213-8
9. Operation Wombat (Hodder, 2001); ISBN 978-0-7336-1211-4
10. Dollar for a Dolphin (Hodder Headline, 2001); ISBN 978-0-7336-1214-5
11. Dog on the Job (Hodder Headline, 2012); ISBN 978-0-7336-1380-7
12. Camel Breath (Hodder Headline 2001); ISBN 978-0-7336-1382-1)
13. Mouse Pad (Hodder Headline, 2012); ISBN 978-0-7336-1381-4
14. Duck for Luck (Hodder Headline, 2001); ISBN 978-0-7336-1383-8
15. Owl Express (Hodder Headline, 2012); ISBN 978-0-7336-1384-5
16. Pups for Sale ISBN 0733614868, ISBN 9780733614866
17. Kidding Around (Hodder Headline, 2002); ISBN 978-0-7336-1486-6
18. Shark in the Dark (Hodder Headline, 2002); ISBN 978-0-7336-1488-0)
19. Llama Drama (Hodder Headline, 2002); ISBN 978-0-7336-1489-7
20. Leap Frog (Hodder Headline, 2002) ISBN 978-0-7336-1490-3)
21. Penguin Parade (Hodder Headline, 2002); ISBN 978-0-7336-1491-0

=== Hair-Raisers series ===
Writing as Lee Striker.

- 1. Evil at Camp Star
- 2. House of the Living Dead
- 5. Bite Your Head Off
- 7. Teacher Torture
- 9. Body Parts

=== Aussie Bites books ===
- Snap! (1997)
- Crackle!
- Pop! (1999)
- S. N. A. G. the Sensitive New Age Gladiator
- Silent Knight
- Mummy's Boy
- Willie Tell or Won't He
- Joan of Art
- The Worst Nurse

=== Miscellaneous ===
- Pugwall
- Pugwall's Summer
- The Big Chocolate Bar (1991)
- Tina Tuff (1991)
- Famous for Five Minutes
- Ripper and Fang (1992)
- Plastic City (1992)
- Hold My Hand – Or Else
- Fat Chance (1996)
- Love on the Net (1996)
- Living with Leanne
- Calvin the Clutterbuster (1994)
- Ghost on Toast (1994)
- Tina Tuff in Trouble
- The Biggest Boast
- Hot or What
- Weird Warren
- Butterfingers (1994)
- Wally the Whiz Kid (1995)
- Britt the Boss
- Wacky Mac
- Copycat
- Back on Track – Diary of a Street Kid
- Pulling the Moves
- Tuesday Trouble
