= Out of Ireland =

1999 novel by Christopher Koch

- First edition
- Author: Christopher Koch
- Language: English
- Genre: Historical fiction
- Publisher: Doubleday
- Publication date: 1999
- Publication place: Australia
- Media type: Print (hardback & paperback)
- Pages: 720
- ISBN: 978-0099286974

Out of Ireland is a 1999 novel by Christopher Koch that tells the story of Irish 'gentleman-convict' Robert Devereux and his transportation to Van Diemen's Land (Tasmania). Koch observed that Out of Ireland was an exploration of his "interest in the idea that the past resonates off the future." The novel is considered uniquely Tasmanian because of the way it deals with convict ancestry and emphasizes the island's geographic isolation.

== Plot ==
The novel starts with Devereux, an Irish revolutionary, aboard a convict prison hulk in Bermuda. It then follows his transportation to Van Diemen's Land, his release and subsequent adventures on the island.

== Reception ==
Out of Ireland was well received, winning the Colin Roderick Award in 1999 and the Victorian Premier's Prize for Fiction in 2000.
