= The Year of Living Dangerously (film) =

1982 Australian romantic political drama

- Theatrical release poster
- Directed by: Peter Weir
- Screenplay by: David Williamson; Peter Weir; C. J. Koch
- Based on: The Year of Living Dangerously; 1978 novel by C. J. Koch
- Produced by: James McElroy
- Starring: Mel Gibson; Sigourney Weaver; Bill Kerr; Michael Murphy; Linda Hunt; Noel Ferrier
- Cinematography: Russell Boyd
- Edited by: William M. Anderson
- Music by: Maurice Jarre
- Production companies: Metro-Goldwyn-Mayer; Freddie Fields Productions; McElroy and McElroy
- Distributed by: MGM/UA Entertainment Company (US); United International Pictures (International)
- Release date: 16 December 1982
- Running time: 114 minutes
- Countries: Australia; United States; Philippines
- Languages: English; Tagalog; Indonesian
- Budget: A$6 million
- Box office: A$2.9 million; US$10.3 million

The Year of Living Dangerously is a 1982 romantic drama film directed by Peter Weir and co-written by Weir and David Williamson. It was adapted from Christopher Koch's 1978 novel The Year of Living Dangerously. The story is about a love affair set in Indonesia during the overthrow of President Sukarno. It follows a group of foreign correspondents in Jakarta during the weeks leading up to the attempted coup by the 30 September Movement in 1965. The film is considered one of the last in the Australian New Wave genre.

The film stars Mel Gibson as Australian journalist Guy Hamilton, and Sigourney Weaver as British embassy officer Jill Bryant. It also stars Linda Hunt as a Chinese Australian man with dwarfism, Billy Kwan, Hamilton's local photographer contact, a role for which Hunt won the 1983 Academy Award for Best Supporting Actress. The film was shot in both Australia and the Philippines, and includes Australian actors Bill Kerr as Colonel Henderson and Noel Ferrier as Wally O'Sullivan.

It was banned from being shown in Indonesia until 2000, after the forced resignation of coup leader and political successor Suharto in 1998. The title The Year of Living Dangerously is a quote which refers to a famous Italian phrase used by Sukarno: vivere pericolosamente, meaning "living dangerously". Sukarno used the line for the title of his Indonesian Independence Day speech of 1964.

== Plot ==
Guy Hamilton, a novice foreign correspondent for an Australian radio network, arrives in Jakarta on assignment in 1965. He meets the close-knit members of the foreign correspondent community, including journalists from the UK, the US, and New Zealand; diplomatic personnel; and Billy Kwan, a photo-journalist and outlier in the journalist community. A Chinese-Australian man with dwarfism, high intelligence, and moral seriousness, Kwan is deeply involved with and concerned for the people of Jakarta and their tribulations, even regularly providing for a destitute woman and her young son. Guy is initially unsuccessful as a journalist because his predecessor, tired of life in Indonesia, had departed without introducing Guy to his contacts. He receives limited sympathy from the journalist community, which competes for scraps of information from Sukarno's regime, the Communist Party of Indonesia (PKI), and the conservative, Muslim-dominated Indonesian military. However, Billy takes a liking to Guy and arranges interviews for him with key political figures.

Billy introduces Guy to Jill Bryant, a beautiful young assistant at the British Embassy. Billy and Jill are close friends, yet Billy subtly manipulates her encounters with Guy. Since she is returning to the UK shortly, Jill initially resists Guy's attentions, but eventually they fall in love. When Jill discovers that the Chinese communists are arming the PKI in preparation for civil war, she passes this information to Guy, informing him that all foreigners will be in danger. She advises him to leave the country, but he uses the information to write about the communist rebellion that will occur when the arms shipment reaches Jakarta. Upset with Guy's lack of discretion and concerned it will lead back to Jill as the informant, Billy and Jill cut off contact with Guy; he is left with the American journalist Pete Curtis and his own assistant and driver Kumar, who is secretly a member of the PKI. Kumar, however, remains loyal to Guy, and tries to open his eyes to all that is going on.

After the boy Billy had been caring for becomes ill and dies, Billy becomes despondent and disillusioned over Sukarno's failure to meet the needs of the Indonesian people. He hangs a banner with "Sukarno feed your people" from the Hotel Indonesia to express his outrage, but he is thrown from the window by security men and dies in Guy's arms. His death is also witnessed by Jill. Still pursuing his civil war scoop, Guy attempts to access the presidential palace where, having learned of the communist shipment, the army generals have taken over and unleashed executions. Struck down by an army officer, Guy suffers a serious eye injury. Resting alone in Billy's bungalow, Guy recalls a passage from the Bhagavad Gita, "all is clouded by desire", which Billy had recited to him. Kumar visits him and tells him about the failed coup attempt. Risking permanent damage to his eye, a bandaged Guy implores Kumar to drive him to the airport, where he boards the last plane out of Jakarta and is reunited with Jill.

== Cast ==
- Mel Gibson as Guy Hamilton
- Sigourney Weaver as Jill Bryant
- Bill Kerr as Colonel Henderson
- Michael Murphy as Pete Curtis
- Linda Hunt as Billy Kwan
- Noel Ferrier as Wally O'Sullivan
- Bembol Roco as Kumar
- Paul Sonkkila as Kevin Condon
- Ali Nur as Ali
- Mike Emperio as Soekarno
- Domingo Landicho as Hartono
- Kuh Ledesma as Tiger Lily
- Cecily Polson as Moira

== Production ==
=== Development ===
A number of filmmakers were interested in buying the rights to Christopher Koch's novel, including Phillip Noyce. It was Peter Weir who was successful. Koch wrote an early draft script but Weir was unhappy with it. Alan Sharp wrote three more drafts, then David Williamson was brought on to do several more drafts. Koch later came back on to work on some of the voice over, although he never spoke with Peter Weir. Koch later claimed that the final script was "55% Williamson/Weir, and 45% Koch".

The film was originally backed by the South Australian Film Corporation and the Australian Film Commission, with international distribution arranged by MGM/UA Entertainment Company. However, the SAFC then dropped out and Weir's agent suggested MGM provide the entire $6 million budget themselves, which is what happened. It was by far the most ambitious Australian film undertaken at the time and was one of the first co-productions between Australia and a Hollywood studio.

=== Casting ===
Linda Hunt as Billy Kwan

Dancer David Atkins was originally cast as Billy Kwan. However, during rehearsals Weir began to feel that the relationship between his character and Mel Gibson's was not working so he decided to recast. Several actors auditioned, including Bob Balaban and Wallace Shawn, when Weir saw a photo of Linda Hunt. He asked for her to audition and decided to cast her. Weir said on casting Hunt, "I never would have started out looking for a woman ... But from the moment I saw her test, I knew she was appropriate." To accomplish the role during production, Hunt shortened "her hair and dye[d] it black[,] wore padding around her waist, shaved her eyebrows, and carried something in her shirt pocket." In her 1986 interview with Bomb magazine, Hunt agreed with the interviewer's remarks that Billy Kwan "is supra-personal [with] layers of sexual ambiguity[.]"

=== Filming ===
Although originally set to be filmed in Jakarta, permission to film in Indonesia was denied, so the bulk of the film was shot in the Philippines, in Manila's Quiapo district and the Banaue Rice Terraces. Weir said, "All slums look alike, after all." Death threats against Weir and Gibson from Muslims who believed the film would be anti-Islamic forced the production to move to Australia. The crew moved to Sydney in early April 1982 during its fifth week of the six-week Philippine shoot with only a few small scenes remaining. Filming in Australia took another six weeks.

Gibson downplayed the death threats, saying, "It wasn't really that bad. We got a lot of death threats to be sure, but I just assumed that when there are so many, it must mean nothing is really going to happen. I mean, if they meant to kill us, why send a note?"

Gibson described his character Guy, saying, "He's not a silver-tongued devil. He's kind of immature and he has some rough edges and I guess you could say the same for me."

=== Music ===
The original score is by Maurice Jarre, and contains several period pieces, such as Tutti Frutti and Long Tall Sally by Little Richard, and Whole Lotta Shakin' Goin' On by Jerry Lee Lewis. The theme music, for which it is best-known, is L’Enfant by Vangelis.

The character Billy Kwan has an appreciation of classical music, including a piece from "Four Last Songs" by Richard Strauss.

== Release ==
The Year of Living Dangerously opened in Australia on 16 December 1982 at Sydney's Pitt Centre. The film was entered into the 1983 Cannes Film Festival attended by Weir, Gibson and Weaver to promote it, where it was well received by audiences and critics. Gibson attended the festival during a break from filming The Bounty in London.

=== Home media ===
The film was released for sale or rental in Australia on VHS in 1984 and on LaserDisc in 1985 with a runtime of 117-minute cut. Warner Bros. released The Year of Living Dangerously in the United States on DVD in June 2000 with a theatrical trailer as the sole extra feature. In 2002 it was issued on DVD in Australia.

== Reception ==
=== Box office ===
The film opened in Australia on 17 December 1982. Filmed on a budget of $6 million, The Year of Living Dangerously grossed $2,898,000 at the box office in Australia.

The film opened in the United States via limited release on 21 January 1983 before receiving a wide release on 18 February 1983. In its limited release opening weekend in the US, the film earned $35,000 from one theatre. When released nationwide, the film ranked thirteenth in the box office grossing $1,716,040 on 690 theatres during the Presidents' Day weekend. In its sixth weekend since its limited opening (however, second nationwide release weekend), The Year of Living Dangerously made $1.2 million in 679 theatres (a total of $3,469,305 over that period), rising to eleventh. It then made $932,370 on its seventh weekend (third nationwide) a 25.7% drop, and $802,753 on its eighth weekend across 290 screens—both finishing thirteenth.

After 49 weeks in theatres, the film would finish with a box office gross of $10.3 million.

=== Critical reception ===
On review aggregator website Rotten Tomatoes, the film has an 88% rating based on 34 reviews, with an average rating of 7.8/10. The site's consensus states: "Both a smart, suspenseful tale of intrigue and a sweeping romance, The Year of Living Dangerously features excellent performances from Mel Gibson as a journalist and Sigourney Weaver as a staffer at the British Embassy in Jakarta during the political unrest in Indonesia." Metacritic reports a 65 out of 100 rating based on 9 critics, indicating "generally favorable reviews". Film critic Roger Ebert of the Chicago Sun-Times gave the film four out of four stars and praised Hunt's performance: "Billy Kwan is played, astonishingly, by a woman—Linda Hunt, a New York stage actress who enters the role so fully that it never occurs to us that she is not a man. This is what great acting is, a magical transformation of one person into another". In his review for The New York Times, Vincent Canby praised Gibson's performance: "If this film doesn't make an international star of Mr. Gibson (Gallipoli, The Road Warrior), then nothing will. He possesses both the necessary talent and the screen presence".

However, Richard Corliss of Time wrote, "But in his attempt to blend his preoccupations with the plot of C. J. Koch's 1978 novel, Weir has perhaps packed too much imagery and information into his movie ... The plot becomes landlocked in true-life implausibilities; the characters rarely get a hold on the moviegoer's heart or lapels". In his review for the Washington Post, Gary Arnold described the film as "a grievously flawed yet compelling tale of political intrigue, certainly a triumph of atmosphere if not of coherent dramatization". Newsweek magazine called the film "an annoying failure because it fritters away so many rich opportunities".

Weir was nominated for the Palme d'Or at the 1983 Cannes Film Festival and Hunt won the Academy Award for Best Supporting Actress.

=== Accolades ===
Award	Category	Subject	Result
Academy Awards	Best Supporting Actress	Linda Hunt	Won
Australian Film Institute Awards	Best Film	Jim McElroy	Nominated
Australian Film Institute Awards	Best Direction	Peter Weir	Nominated
Australian Film Institute Awards	Best Actor in a Leading Role	Mel Gibson	Nominated
Australian Film Institute Awards	Best Actress in a Supporting Role	Linda Hunt	Won
Australian Film Institute Awards	Best Adapted Screenplay	Christopher Koch, Peter Weir and David Williamson	Nominated
Australian Film Institute Awards	Best Cinematography	Russell Boyd	Nominated
Australian Film Institute Awards	Best Costume Design	Terry Ryan	Nominated
Australian Film Institute Awards	Best Editing	William M. Anderson	Nominated
Australian Film Institute Awards	Best Original Music Score	Maurice Jarre	Nominated
Australian Film Institute Awards	Best Production Design	Wendy Stites and Herbert Pinter	Nominated
Australian Film Institute Awards	Best Sound	Jeanine Chiavlo, Peter Fenton, Lee Smith and Andrew Steuart	Nominated
Australian Film Institute Awards	Jury Prize	Peter Weir and Linda Hunt	Won
Boston Society of Film Critics Awards	Best Supporting Actress	Linda Hunt	Won
Cannes Film Festival	Palme d'Or	Peter Weir	Nominated
Cinema Writers Circle Awards	Best Foreign Film		Won
Golden Globe Awards	Best Supporting Actress – Motion Picture	Linda Hunt	Nominated
Kansas City Film Critics Circle Awards	Best Supporting Actress	Linda Hunt	Won
Los Angeles Film Critics Association Awards	Best Supporting Actress	Linda Hunt	Won
National Board of Review Awards	Best Supporting Actress	Linda Hunt	Won
National Society of Film Critics Awards	Best Supporting Actress	Linda Hunt	3rd Place
New York Film Critics Circle Awards	Best Supporting Actress	Linda Hunt	Won
Writers Guild of America Awards	Best Drama – Adapted from Another Medium	David Williamson, Peter Weir and C. J. Koch	Nominated

== See also ==
- Indonesian mass killings of 1965–1966
- Examples of Yellowface
