= Inside Dope =

1995 crime novel by New Zealand writer Paul Thomas

- Author: Paul Thomas
- Language: English
- Genre: Novel
- Publisher: Mandarin Publishing, Melbourne, Australia
- Publication date: 1995
- Publication place: New Zealand
- Media type: Print Paperback
- Pages: 314 pp
- ISBN: 1-86330-505-X (first edition, paperback)
- OCLC: 38385638
- Preceded by: Old School Tie
- Followed by: Guerilla Season

Inside Dope is a 1995 Ned Kelly Award-winning novel by the New Zealand author Paul Thomas.

== Synopsis ==
Duane Ricketts had intended to go straight after leaving a Thai prison, but the prospect of making a bundle by locating the missing drug haul of the Mr Asia drug cartel (ten kilos of top-grade cocaine) is too good a chance to pass up. But he also has to contend with NZ cop Tito Ihaka, the CIA, and an American narcotics agents working for himself.

== Awards ==
- Ned Kelly Awards for Crime Writing, Best Novel, 1996: joint winner

== Publication history ==
After its initial publication in 1995 by Mandarin Publishing, the novel was reprinted as follows:

- Hodder Moa Beckett, New Zealand 1995
- Vista, UK 1998

== Dedication ==
"Dedication: To Jeni, and to my mother and father."

== Notes ==
- This is the prequel to the author's follow-up, Guerilla Season.
