= Eric Beach =

New Zealand and Australian poet, playwright, and short story writer

- Born: 1947; New Zealand
- Died: 7 November 2024; Melbourne, Victoria, Australia
- Occupation: Poet
- Writing career
- Notable awards: 1996 The Age Book of the Year Poetry Prize, winner; 1996 Kenneth Slessor Prize for Poetry, co-winner

Eric Beach (1947 – 7 November 2024), was a New Zealand and Australian poet, playwright, and short story writer.

Born in New Zealand, Beach lived in Tasmania and in Victoria from 1972. He was active in the Australian Performance Poetry scene, performing at workshops, readings and events around Australia.

His publication Weeping for Lost Babylon won the 1996 Dinny O'Hearn Poetry Prize, and was joint winner of the Kenneth Slessor Prize for Poetry.

He lived in Minyip, Victoria in Australia.

== Publications ==
- Henry Lawson Petfoods (Fragment Press, 1974) ISBN 0909275033
- Saint Kilda Meets Hugo Ball (Gargoyles Press, 1974) ISBN 0909354014
- In Occupied Territory (The Saturday Centre, 1977) ISBN 0909293260
- A Photo of Some People in a Football Stadium (Overland, 1978) ISBN 0959649506
- Hey Hey Brass Buttons (CACTI, 1990) (edited) ISBN 064602535X
- Weeping for Lost Babylon (HarperCollins, 1996)
- Red Heart My Country (Pardalote Press, 2000) ISBN 0646401610
