= Fat Chance (Clark novel) =

Novel by Margaret Clark

- First edition
- Author: Margaret Clark
- Language: English
- Genre: Young adult novel
- Publisher: Random House
- Publication date: April 1996
- Publication place: Australia
- Media type: Print (paperback)
- Pages: 192
- ISBN: 0-09-182766-3

Fat Chance is a novel that was published in Australia in 1996. It is one of several similar books written by Australian author Margaret Clark.

== Plot summary ==
The story is set in suburban Melbourne, Australia. The protagonist, Lisa Trelaw, is a teenage girl who is overly concerned about her weight. Other characters include her brother, Nick, who frequently teases her; Lisa's hard working father and over-weight mother; and her best friend Penny.

The narrative follows Lisa through a series of life changing events. First, the 'Dog Squad' food van her parents bought and she worked in. Also, the cliff accident where a large rock fell, crushing two of Lisa's friends and narrowly missing her.

The story has an ambiguous climax when Lisa is offered a modelling contract. By this stage Lisa's attitude had gone full circle. She had started out obsessed with her weight, always binge eating and then starving herself. In the end she is confident, eating healthy, with no eating disorder.

== Characters ==
- Lisa. is a teenage girl with symptoms of an eating disorder. She is terrified of being fat and thinks her body is disgusting. Lisa is the protagonist of the story, and it is her narrative we read in Fat Chance.
- Dad. Lisa's hard working father. It was his idea to buy the 'Dog Squad' food van and set it up at Jan Juc Beach. He wanted the family to make more money so he could work less hours.
- Mum. Lisa's mother. Lisa thinks she is 'fat' and can't understand what her father finds attractive in her mother. Lisa has several conflicts with her mother about the types of food the family eat.
- Nick. Lisa's brother. Always teases his sister; calls her 'Lisa lard legs' and other names that upset Lisa. Nick is very popular and many girls in the story think he is 'cute'.
- Penny. Lisa's best friend. She is slim and her family are very health conscious. Pen is seriously injured when a large rock breaks off a cliff and falls on her.
- Brad 'Creepy' Crawley. Always teases Lisa, but seems to secretly like her.
- Mike. Another boy who likes Lisa. He is very kind and supportive after the cliff accident.
- Shelley. Another one of Lisa's Friends that is slim and healthy. Shelley was injured in the same accident as Penny.

== Narrative ==
The narrative is first-person point of view. The narrator is Lisa Trelaw. The first-person narrative suits the story for a couple of key reasons:

- It allows the reader to get more emotionally involved in Lisa's story.
- Overall, it gives the text greater emotional pull. This is important in a text that is directed at teenagers. A Third person narrative would be too distant and aloof.

The narrative presents the events of the story in chronological order.

== Major themes ==
There are several issues raised in the text, the most notable are:

- Peer pressure - the influence of friendship on a person's behaviour.
- Media - the role of the media and the influence it has on young minds.
- Eating disorders - the impact of eating disorders, like anorexia and bulimia, on the lives of young women.
- Family relationships - the importance of a supportive and caring family environment for the growth and development of young adults.
- Friends - the importance of friendship in the lives of young adults.
