= Christopher Koch =

Australian novelist (1932–2013)

Christopher Koch AO
- Christopher Koch in 1979
- Born: Christopher John Koch; 16 July 1932; Hobart, Tasmania, Australia
- Died: 23 September 2013 (aged 81); Hobart, Tasmania, Australia
- Education: University of Tasmania
- Occupation: Novelist
- Spouse(s): Irene Vilnois (m. 1959; div. 1979) Robin Whyte-Butler
- Children: Gareth Koch
- Writing career
- Language: English
- Notable work: The Year of Living Dangerously
- Notable awards: Miles Franklin Award (1985, 1996)

Christopher John Koch AO (16 July 1932 – 23 September 2013) was an Australian novelist, known for his 1978 novel The Year of Living Dangerously, which was adapted into an Academy Award-winning film by the same name for which he co-wrote the screenplay. He twice won the Miles Franklin Award (for The Doubleman in 1985 and Highways to a War in 1996). In 1995, he was made an Officer of the Order of Australia for his contribution to Australian literature, and was awarded an honorary Doctor of Letters from his alma mater, the University of Tasmania, in 1990.

== Early life and education ==
Koch was born in Hobart, Tasmania, in 1932. He was educated at Clemes College, St Virgil's College, and Hobart High School and later attended the University of Tasmania. Koch's admission to the university was controversial, with the professorial board refusing to admit him as he had not matriculated with a mathematics subject; however, this refusal was overridden by the chancellor, John Morris, who was then accused of excessive intervention. After graduating with a Bachelor of Arts with Honours in 1954, Koch joined the Australian Broadcasting Commission (ABC) as a cadet journalist. He left Hobart to travel in South Asia and Europe, and ended up in London, where he worked for several years. He returned to Australia to avoid national service in the British Army.

== Career ==
While working in London as a waiter and a teacher, Koch began working on his first novel, The Boys in the Island, which he left with his agent when he returned to Australia.

Koch's first published works were several poems published in The Bulletin and the literary journal Southerly. While back at the ABC as a radio producer, The Boys in the Island was published in the UK. The positive reviews encouraged Koch to eventually take up writing full-time in 1972. In the early 1960s, Koch was awarded a writing fellowship to Stanford University, where he taught literature and was associated with Ken Kesey (author of One Flew Over the Cuckoo's Nest).

Koch's brother, Philip Koch, reporting for ABC-TV in April 1967 towards the end of the Sukarno era

His novel The Year of Living Dangerously, set in Jakarta during the fall of the Sukarno regime, was made into a film directed by Peter Weir and starring Sigourney Weaver, Mel Gibson and Linda Hunt. The book was loosely inspired by his brother's (Philip Koch) experience as an Australian journalist in Indonesia during that period. Koch himself had worked for two months in Jakarta in 1968 as an adviser to UNESCO.

== Death ==
Koch died at his home in Hobart on 23 September 2013, aged 81. He had been diagnosed with cancer twelve months earlier.

== Personal life ==
Koch married his first wife, Irene Vilnonis, in 1959. Their son, Gareth Koch (born 1962), is a classical guitarist. He married his second wife, Robin Whyte-Butler, in the late 1990s, and she lived with him in Sydney and Tasmania, and was with him when he died in 2013.

== Awards and honours ==
Year	Work	Award	Category	Result	Ref.
1978	The Year of Living Dangerously	The Age Book of the Year Awards	Book of the Year	Won	
1978	The Year of Living Dangerously	The Age Book of the Year Awards	Imaginative Writing (Fiction)	Won	
1979	The Year of Living Dangerously	National Book Council Award for Australian Literature	—	Won	
1985	The Doubleman	Miles Franklin Award		Won	
1996	Highways to a War	Miles Franklin Award	—	Won	
1999	Out of Ireland	Colin Roderick Award	—	Won	
2000	Out of Ireland	Victorian Premier's Literary Awards	Vance Palmer Prize for Fiction	Won	
2008	The Memory Room	Miles Franklin Award	—	Longlisted	
2008	The Memory Room	Nib Literary Award	—	Won	
2009	The Memory Room	International Dublin Literary Award	—	Longlisted	
2013	Lost Voices	ALS Gold Medal		Shortlisted	
2013	Lost Voices	Prime Minister's Literary Awards	Fiction	Shortlisted	
2013	Lost Voices	Queensland Literary Awards	Fiction	Shortlisted	

== Published works ==
- The Boys in the Island (1958, revised ed, Angus & Robertson, 1974)
- Across the Sea Wall (Heinemann, 1965)
- The Year of Living Dangerously (Nelson, 1978)
- The Doubleman (Chatto and Windus, 1985)
- Crossing the Gap: a novelist's essays (Hogarth Press, 1993)
- Highways to a War (Heinemann, 1995)
- Out of Ireland (Doubleday, 1999)
- The Many-Coloured Land: A Return to Ireland (Picador, 2002)
- The Memory Room (2007)
- Lost Voices (2012)
