= Linda Hunt =

American actress (born 1945)

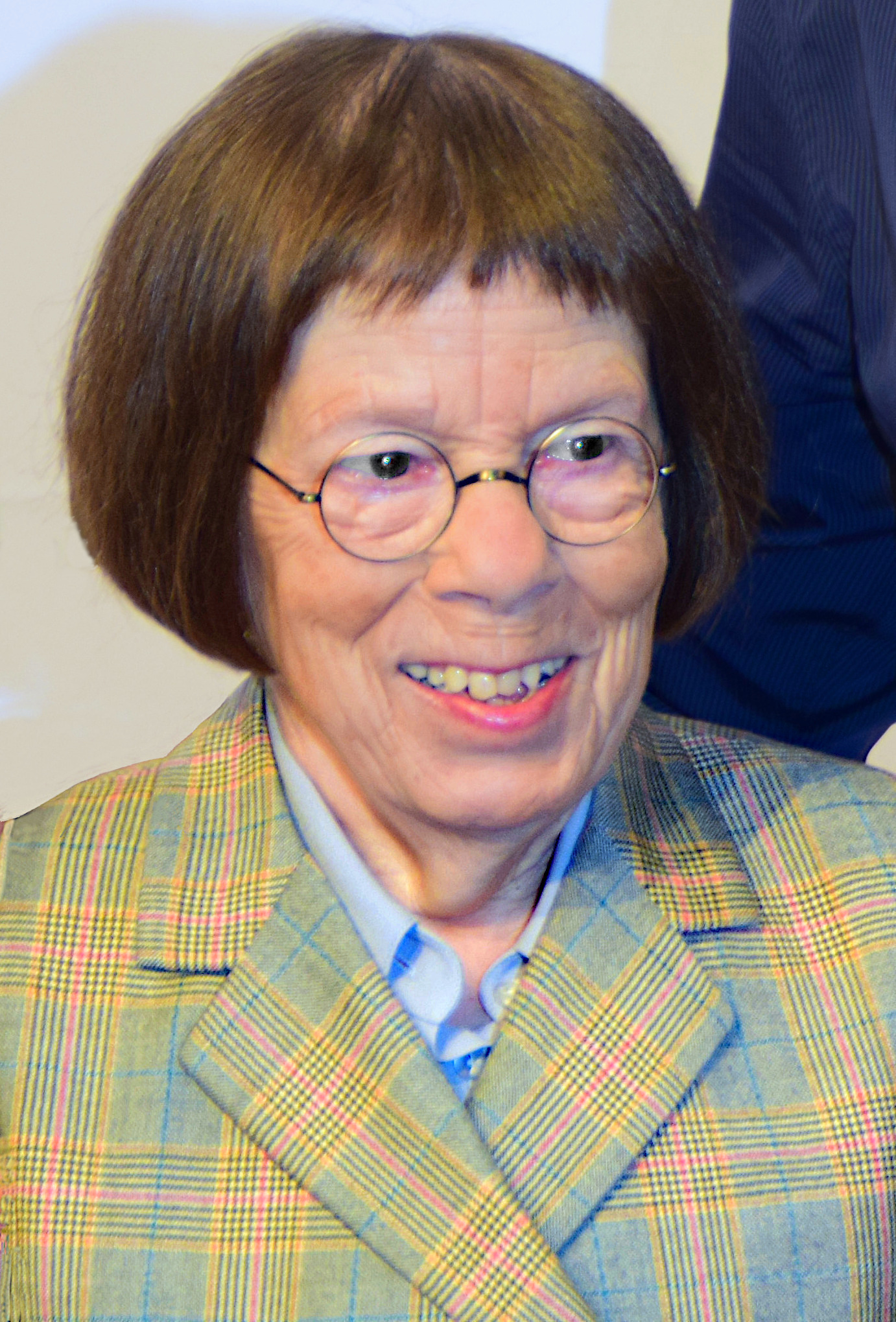
- Hunt in 2015
- Born: Lydia Susanna Hunt; April 2, 1945 (age 81); Morristown, New Jersey, U.S.
- Education: Art Institute of Chicago (BFA)
- Occupation: Actress
- Years active: 1972–present
- Height: 145 cm (4 ft 9 in)
- Spouse: Karen Kline (m. 2008)
- Awards: Academy Award for Best Supporting Actress (1983)

Linda Hunt (born Lydia Susanna Hunt; April 2, 1945) is an American actress. She made her film debut playing Mrs. Oxheart in Popeye (1980). Her portrayal of the male character Billy Kwan in The Year of Living Dangerously (1982) won her the Academy Award for Best Supporting Actress, making her the first person to win an Oscar for portraying a character of the opposite sex. Hunt has also appeared in films such as Dune (1984), Silverado (1985), Eleni (1985), Kindergarten Cop (1990), Pocahontas (1995), Pocahontas II: Journey to a New World (1998), and Stranger Than Fiction (2006).

Hunt has had a successful career on television and in voice-over work, notably providing the voice of the narrator for the Ancient Greek mythology themed God of War video game series. From 1997 to 2002, she played the recurring role of Judge Zoey Hiller on The Practice and played Commander Chennault on the sci-fi series Space Rangers. From 2009 to 2023, she portrayed Henrietta "Hetty" Lange on the CBS television series NCIS: Los Angeles, a role for which she has received two Teen Choice Awards.

== Early life ==
Hunt was born on April 2, 1945, in Morristown, New Jersey. Her father, Raymond Davy Hunt (1902–1985), was vice president of Harper Fuel Oil. Her mother, Elsie Doying Hunt (1903 – c. 1994), was a piano teacher who taught at the Westport School of Music, and performed with the Saugatuck Congregational Church Choir in Westport, Connecticut, the town where Hunt was raised. She has one sibling, an older sister named Marcia (born 1940). Hunt attended the Interlochen Arts Academy and graduated from the Goodman School of Drama at the Art Institute of Chicago (now at DePaul University).

As a teenager, Hunt was diagnosed with hypopituitary dwarfism. Hunt stands 4 feet 9 inches (145 cm) tall.

== Career ==
=== Theatre ===
Hunt was a well-known live-stage actress before she entered film and television. She made her Broadway debut in the 1975 revival of Ah, Wilderness. She was nominated for the Tony Award for Best Actress in a Play for her work in the 1984 play End of the World. She also received two ensemble Obie Awards for her work Off-Broadway in Top Girls and A Metamorphosis in Miniature.

Hunt created the role of Aunt Dan in Wallace Shawn's play Aunt Dan and Lemon. She was a member of the Long Wharf Theatre Company in Connecticut, where she performed the Player Queen in a production of Hamlet, amongst other roles. She portrayed Sister Aloysius in the Pasadena Playhouse production of John Patrick Shanley's play Doubt. Hunt was praised for her performance as the title character in Bertolt Brecht's Mother Courage and Her Children. She also appeared as Pope Joan in Caryl Churchill's Top Girls when London's Royal Court Theatre's production was staged at the Public Theater in New York.

In an interview with writer Craig Gholson and actor Vincent Caristi, Hunt said: "Acting onstage is like an explosion each night. And what comes in at you all the time as you are trying to . . . create something which is a tremendous act of organization and concentration."

=== Film ===
Known for her small stature, Hunt made her film debut in 1980 in Robert Altman's musical comedy Popeye.

Two years later, Hunt co-starred as Billy Kwan in The Year of Living Dangerously, Peter Weir's film adaptation of the novel of the same name. For her work in this film, Hunt won the Academy Award for Best Supporting Actress in 1983, becoming the first person to win an Oscar for playing a character of the opposite sex. In her screen test, Hunt wore a hairpiece, a fake moustache, and "paste-on pieces above her eyes to [appear] Asian." To play the role, Hunt had her hair dyed and cut short, had her eyebrows shaved, wore padding and makeup, and wore something in her shirt pocket. In her 1986 interview with the Bomb magazine, Hunt remarked that Billy Kwan "is supra-personal [with] layers of sexual ambiguity[.]"

Hunt also played the Shadout Mapes in Dune (1984), a nurse in She-Devil (1989), the austere school principal Miss Schlowski opposite Arnold Schwarzenegger in Kindergarten Cop (1990), and assassin Ilsa Grunt in If Looks Could Kill (1991).

=== Television ===
Hunt's television appearances include recurring roles as Judge Zoey Hiller on David E. Kelley's series The Practice and as Dr. Claire Bryson on Without a Trace. She has narrated several installments of The American Experience on PBS.

From 2009 to 2023, Hunt co-starred as Operations Manager Henrietta "Hetty" Lange on the CBS television series NCIS: Los Angeles. Her co-stars on the series included Chris O'Donnell, LL Cool J, Daniela Ruah, Eric Christian Olsen, Miguel Ferrer and Barrett Foa. Hunt was a main cast member on the series for twelve seasons, but was downgraded to a special guest star position in season thirteen as a safety precaution due to the COVID-19 pandemic. She was supposed to return in the series finale, but was unable to due to availability issues. As a result, her return was condensed to a voiceover. Hunt won two Teen Choice Awards for her work on NCIS: Los Angeles.

=== Voice work ===
Hunt is known for her husky voice. She has narrated numerous documentaries, cartoons, and commercials. She is the on-air host for City Arts & Lectures, a radio program recorded by KQED public radio at the Nourse Theater in San Francisco. Hunt voiced the role of Grandmother Willow in the animated musical film Pocahontas (1995) and its direct-to-video sequel Pocahontas II: Journey to a New World (1998).

Hunt narrated the National Geographic documentary The Great Indian Railway (1995). In 1998, she narrated the Discovery Channel documentary "Titanic: Untold Stories." Hunt's voice work also includes the character of Management in Carnivàle (2003, 2005) and the narrator for God of War video game series. She narrated a PBS Nature special entitled Christmas in Yellowstone (2006).

== Personal life ==
Hunt has been in a relationship with psychotherapist Karen Kline since 1978. The two were married in 2008.

Hunt is an ambassador for the Best Friends Animal Society.

In July 2018, People magazine reported that Hunt was involved in a multi-car accident in Los Angeles, which resulted in her taking almost a year off from NCIS: Los Angeles.

== Acting credits ==
=== Film ===
Year	Film	Role	Notes
1980	Popeye	Mrs. Holly Oxheart	
1982	The Year of Living Dangerously	Billy Kwan	Academy Award for Best Supporting Actress; Australian Film Institute Award for Best Actress in a Supporting Role; Australian Film Institute Jury Prize (shared with Peter Weir); Boston Society of Film Critics Award for Best Supporting Actress; Kansas City Film Critics Circle Award for Best Supporting Actress (tie with Mia Farrow for Zelig); Los Angeles Film Critics Association Award for Best Supporting Actress; National Board of Review Award for Best Supporting Actress; New York Film Critics Circle Award for Best Supporting Actress; Nominated—Golden Globe Award for Best Supporting Actress – Motion Picture; Nominated—National Society of Film Critics Award for Best Supporting Actress
1984	Dune	Shadout Mapes	
1984	The Bostonians	Dr. Charlotte Prance	
1985	Eleni	Katina	
1985	Silverado	Stella	
1987	Waiting for the Moon	Alice B. Toklas	
1989	She-Devil	Hooper	
1990	Kindergarten Cop	Miss Ingrid Schlowski	
1990	Carmilla	Narrator	
1991	If Looks Could Kill	Ilsa Grunt	
1992	Rain Without Thunder	Atwood Society Director	
1993	Younger and Younger	Frances	
1993	Twenty Bucks	Angeline	
1994	Prêt-à-Porter	Regina Krumm	National Board of Review Award for Best Acting Ensemble
1995	Pocahontas	Grandmother Willow	Voice
1996	Paul Monette: The Brink of Summer's End	Herself	Narrator (documentary)
1997	The Relic	Dr. Ann Cuthbert	
1997	Amazon	Narrator	Voice
1997	Eat Your Heart Out	Kathryn	
1998	Pocahontas II: Journey to a New World	Grandmother Willow	Voice
1998	Out of the Past	Narrator	Voice
2002	Dragonfly	Sister Madeline	
2005	Auschwitz: The Nazis and the 'Final Solution'	Narrator	Voice
2005	Yours, Mine & Ours	Mrs. Edna Munion	
2005	The Great Transatlantic Cable	Narrator	
2006	Stranger Than Fiction	Dr. Jill Mittag-Leffler	
2007	The Singing Revolution	Narrator	
2017	The Relationtrip	Dr. Lipschweiss	
2018	Solo: A Star Wars Story	Lady Proxima	Voice

=== Television ===
Year	Title	Role	Notes
1976	Great Performances	Nora	1 episode
1978	Fame	Mona	
1987	American Playhouse	Alice B Toklas	1 episode
1987	Basements	Rose Hudd	Segment: "The Room"—director: Robert Altman
1987	The Room Upstairs	Mrs. Felicia Sanders	TV movie
1993	Space Rangers	Commander Chenault	
1997–2002	The Practice	Judge Zoey Hiller	24 episodes
1998–2006	The American Experience	Narrator	
2003	Before We Ruled the Earth	Narrator	
2003–2005	Carnivàle	Management—voice	9 episodes
2006	Nature	Narrator	Episode: "Christmas in Yellowstone"
2007	The Unit	Dr. Eudora Hobbs	2 episodes
2008	Without a Trace	Dr. Claire Bryson	3 episodes
2009–2021, 2023	NCIS: Los Angeles	Henrietta "Hetty" Lange	Starring role
2011, 2012	Teen Choice Awards	Herself	Teen Choice Award for Choice TV Actress Action
2014	Scorpion	Henrietta "Hetty" Lange	Episode: "True Colors"

=== Theater ===
Year	Title	Role	Notes
1972	Hamlet	Player	New York Shakespeare Festival
1975	Ah, Wilderness!	Norah	Broadway
1983	Little Victories	N/A	Off-Broadway
1983	Top Girls	Pope Joan / Louise	Off-Broadway
1984	End of the World	Audrey Wood	Broadway
1985	Aunt Dan and Lemon	Aunt Dan	The Public Theatre
1988	The Cherry Orchard	Charlotta	Brooklyn Academy of Music

=== Video games ===
- Disney's Animated Storybook: Pocahontas as Grandmother Willow
- God of War as Narrator
- God of War II as Gaia/Narrator
- God of War: Chains of Olympus as Narrator
- God of War: Ghost of Sparta as Narrator
- God of War: Ascension as Narrator

=== Theme parks ===
Year	Title	Role	Notes
1998	Fantasmic!	Grandmother Willow	Voice

== See also ==
- List of actors with Academy Award nominations
- List of LGBTQ Academy Award winners and nominees — Confirmed individuals for Best Supporting Actress
