= The Year of Living Dangerously (novel) =

Book by Christopher Koch

- First edition
- Author: Christopher Koch
- Cover artist: David Lancashire (jacket designer)
- Language: English
- Genre: Adventure novel
- Publisher: Nelson, Michael Joseph
- Publication date: 1978
- Publication place: Australia
- Media type: Print (Hardback & Paperback)
- Pages: 296
- ISBN: 9780732296483

The Year of Living Dangerously is a 1978 novel by Christopher Koch in which an Australian journalist, a Chinese-Australian photojournalist and a British diplomat interact in Indonesia in the summer and autumn of 1965. Set primarily in the Indonesian capital city of Jakarta, it also describes a partly fictionalised version of the events leading up to the coup attempt by the Communist Party of Indonesia on September 30, 1965.

The novel's title refers to the Italian phrase vivere pericoloso. It is roughly translated into English as "living dangerously". Indonesian President Sukarno used the phrase for the title of his Independence Day speech of 17 August 1964.

== Plot introduction ==
The novel is narrated by "Cookie", a news agency reporter. Cookie is an older man who acted as a father confessor to many of the characters in the novel and is telling the story several years after it happened. He is a stand-in for author Christopher Koch, and helps illuminate the ways in which identity is mediated by other people's perceptions of an individual and by that individual's perception of him- or herself.

Thematically, the novel explores the ways in which Australians began to conceptualise themselves differently from Europeans in the post-World War II era and the way Eastern religions such as Shintoism and Buddhism offer new ways to approach old problems. Billy the dwarf's telling of the Indonesian wayang shadow puppet play of the Buddhist legend of Prince Arjun and Princess Skrikandi illustrates the Hindu belief that there is no right or wrong and there are no final answers—one of the ideas raised by Eastern religions.

== Plot ==
Guy Hamilton, a foreign correspondent for the Australian Broadcasting Service, arrives in Jakarta on assignment. He meets members of the close-knit community of British and Australians in the city, which includes journalists and diplomatic personnel. Among them is Billy Kwan, a Chinese-Australian dwarf who is a photojournalist. Hamilton's predecessor departed Indonesia before Guy arrived, and did not introduce Hamilton to any of his news contacts. Hamilton receives only limited support from the other foreign journalists in Jakarta, who compete for information from the Sukarno government, the Indonesian Communist Party (PKI), and the Indonesian National Armed Forces. Believing Hamilton to be a moral person, Billy (who is exceptionally well-connected) helps him obtain interviews. Hamilton's reputation as a journalist soars. Billy keeps photographs and notes about the people he knows, recording his observations of their character and their lives and making up stories about their possible motivations. Hamilton is alarmed to discover that Billy is keeping a file on him, too, but decides to trust Billy anyway. Hamilton and others frequently confide in the narrator, Cookie, who intersperses the story with details from Billy's files, such as that Billy is supporting a local woman, known only as Ibu, and her children living in Jakarta's slums with food and money.

Billy introduces Hamilton to Jill Bryant, a beautiful young diplomat at the British embassy. Billy and Jill are close friends, even to the extent that Billy poses as her boyfriend so she can avoid unwanted attention, and Billy subtly manipulates events so that Hamilton and Jill continue to encounter one another. Hamilton quickly falls in love with Jill, and their relationship starts soon after a trip to the port of Priok. Hamilton also learns that Billy is a strong supporter of the Sukarno regime but is very concerned with the extreme poverty afflicting Indonesia.

Jill's diplomatic work is a cover for her real job as an intelligence officer at the British embassy. She discovers that the People's Republic of China is apparently sending a shipment of weapons to Indonesia to arm the PKI. Jill tells Hamilton this in confidence, to explain the reason for her spending time with Colonel Henderson, a British diplomat and her former lover. But Hamilton, now focused almost completely on his career, decides to verify the story and scoop the other journalists. His assistant Kumar, a PKI member, suggests they holiday in a Dutch colonial villa in the mountains, but brings along Vera, a suspected KGB officer.

Hamilton visits central Java to cover a PKI protest known as a Long March. His car is surrounded by a hostile crowd of PKI sympathizers. Although he escapes without harm, he is shaken by the close experience with death. On his journey back to Java he attends a village wayang show, a recurring plot element. At the village he encounters Vera, who later seemingly drugs him at a hotel in Bandung. Billy discovers this, and informs Jill who has become pregnant, causing her to end her relationship with Hamilton, and Billy to reject him as well.

Billy is ostracised by the other journalists after Wally, a respected correspondent, is forced to leave the country, with reasons given about his opposition to the regime and unspecified immoralities. Cookie knows about Wally's homosexuality, the rumour uncovered by officials. Billy had made a cutting comment earlier in the week about Wally's homosexuality, and some journalists suspect he revealed this to the régime, although Cookie doubts this.

Increasingly sensitive to the poverty of the average Indonesian, Billy is outraged when the child he has been supporting dies of malnutrition and disease. Deciding that Sukarno has betrayed the revolution which put him in power, Billy toys with the idea of assassinating Sukarno. When Sukarno is due to arrive at the Hotel Indonesia, where foreign journalists stay, an altercation occurs where Billy seemingly falls to his death. According to the secret police he had a pistol, and jumped from the window after unfurling a banner reading 'Sukarno Feed Your People'. Hamilton and Cookie doubt this, but prefer to not let Billy be tarnished as an assassin. Cookie rushes to Billy's bungalow in order to retrieve his files, which allow for the story to be told.

The PKI attempts a coup d'etat on 30 September 1965. Hamilton and Kumar drive to the Presidential Palace, where Hamilton attempts to gain entry by walking past the guards. An Army officer strikes Hamilton in the face with his rifle butt. Badly injured, Henderson rescues Hamilton and takes him to British Embassy property. A physician tells Hamilton that he has a suspected detached retina, and must lie still for a month or risk losing sight in his eye. Hamilton tries again to convince Kumar to leave the party, but Kumar says he is fighting for a better Indonesia.

Hamilton decides to risk losing his eye, and flies to London to take up an ABS posting there, in order to meet Jill who has been posted in Singapore. She meets him on the plane, and they fly together to London.

== Reception ==
Although not even on the short list for the Miles Franklin Award (Australia's top literary prize), the novel won the Age Book of the Year Award in 1978 and the National Book Council Award for Australian Literature in 1979. The novel turned Koch into a household name in Australia, and cemented his reputation as one of the nation's top novelists. As of 1995, The Year of Living Dangerously was considered Koch's finest work. The novel was not widely reviewed in the U.S. at the time of its publication. In one of the few reviews, Kirkus Reviews was less than laudatory, concluding that the political story required too much historical knowledge on the reader's part and dominated the story at the expense of the characters.

The book was banned in Indonesia during the Suharto regime. The ban was lifted after the post-Suharto reform era began in 1998.

== Film adaptation ==
The novel was made into a 1982 film, The Year of Living Dangerously. The film was directed by Peter Weir and written by Koch, Weir, and David Williamson. Actress Linda Hunt won an Academy Award for her portrayal of Billy Kwan. While the novel focuses on the political atmosphere in Indonesia in 1965 and the moral choices faced by the characters, the film focuses more heavily on the love affair between Guy and Jill.

== Bibliography ==
- Duiker, William J. and Spielvogel, Jackson J. The Essential World History. Boston, Mass.: Wadsworth/Cengage Learning, 2011.
- Goldsmith, Ben and Lealand, Geoffrey. Directory of World Cinema: Australia & New Zealand. Bristol, U.K.: Intellect Books, 2010.
- McGregor, Gaile. Eccentric Visions: Re-Constructing Australia. Waterloo, Ont.: Wilfrid Laurier University Press, 1994.
- Ousby, Ian and Abbott, Michael. The Cambridge Guide to Literature in English. Cambridge, U.K.: Cambridge University Press, 1995.
- Vernay, Jean-Francois. Water From the Moon: Illusion and Reality in the Works of Australian Novelist Christopher Koch. Youngstown, N.Y.: Cambria Press, 2007.
