= Gene Nora Jessen =

American aviator (1937–2024)

Gene Nora Stumbough Jessen
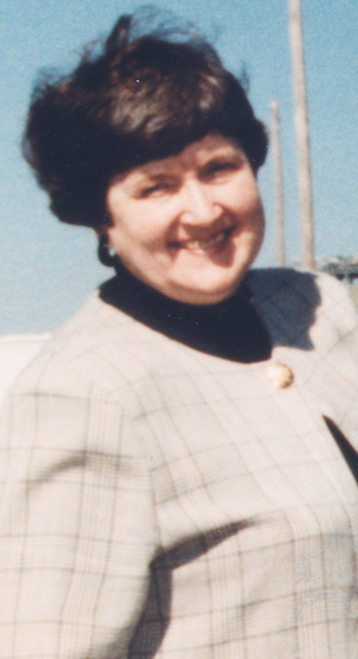
- Born: Gene Nora Stumbough Jessen; January 10, 1937; Springfield, Illinois, U.S.
- Died: May 21, 2024 (aged 87); Meridian, Idaho, U.S.
- Education: Oklahoma University

Gene Nora Stumbough Jessen (January 10, 1937 – May 21, 2024) was an American aviator and a member of Mercury 13. Jessen worked throughout her career as a flight instructor, demonstration pilot, advisor to the Federal Aviation Agency (FAA) and president of the Ninety-Nines. Jessen also wrote about flying and the history of women in flight. Together with Wally Funk, Jessen was one of the last two surviving members of Mercury 13, until her death in 2024.

== Biography ==
Jessen was born in Springfield, Illinois, on January 10, 1937, and grew up in Chicago. Jessen's father was a bank teller with a seventh grade education. Her mother was a writer. She began flying while in her junior year of high school. During that time, she joined the Civil Air Patrol, where one of the students she flew with allowed her to fly the plane sometimes and told her that she was a "natural." Jessen attended Oklahoma University (OU), where she continued to fly and also played cello in the school's symphony orchestra. She was also in the school's flight club, known as the "Air Knockers." While still taking classes at OU, in 1959, Jessen became the first woman to work as a flight instructor for the school. During her time at OU, she earned seven collegiate-level flying trophies. Jessen graduated from OU in 1961. Also in 1961, Jessen was one of 13 women to go through astronaut training with the Mercury 13. Wally Funk was the person who told Jessen about the astronaut testing and soon after finding out about the program, Jessen applied with her flying credentials. She was accepted and travelled to the Lovelace Clinic in Albuquerque, New Mexico for five days of physical examinations, under the supervision of Randy Lovelace, who was asked by NASA to help determine the suitability of women to participate in the space program. Lovelace had previously developed a battery of tests for NASA that were administered to the Mercury Seven. After passing the tests, Jessen was invited to participate in the next round of evaluations held in Pensacola, Florida. After her boss disapproved her request to travel to the next phase of testing, quit her job as a flight instructor. Days before travelling, she received a telegram stating that the Mercury 13 program was cancelled.

Jessen went to work for Beechcraft in 1962 and moved to Wichita, Kansas. Jessen would pilot planes for demonstration purposes for the company. She later embarked on a 90-day cross-country flight with fellow pilot, Joyce Case, in a Beechcraft Musketeer airplane. She eventually was rated to fly the entire line of their aircraft. She met her husband, Bob Jessen, at Beechcraft and after their marriage, they moved to Boise, Idaho in 1967 where they established their own Beechcraft dealership. Jessen spent most of the 70s and 80s raising their son and daughter. Jessen also authored several books documenting the lives and achievements of female aviators.

Jessen was on the women's advisory committee to the Federal Aviation Agency (FAA) and had been appointed by President Lyndon B. Johnson. Between 1988 and 1990, she was President of the Ninety-Nines. In 2007, Jessen and the other Mercury 13 women received honorary doctorates at the University of Wisconsin-Oshkosh (UWO). This was the first time they had been honored as a group.

In 2017, Jessen began to experience macular degeneration in her left eye and was forced to stop flying.

Jessen died on May 21, 2024, in Meridian, Idaho at the age of 87.

== Writing ==
Jessen's 2018 book, Sky Girls, is a chronicle of the 1929 Powder Puff Derby. Jessen personally interviewed many of the original pilots who flew in the race. Sky Girls was previously published under the title The Powder Puff Derby of 1929. Publishers Weekly called the first version of the book a "well-wrought bit of Americana."

== Selected bibliography ==
- Sixty and counting: 60th Anniversary Commemorative Collection, 1929–1989. Oklahoma: Ninety-Nines. 1989. OCLC 44424012.
- The Powder Puff Derby of 1929: The First All Women's Transcontinental Air Race. Naperville, Illinois: Sourcebooks. 2002. ISBN 978-1-57071-769-7.
- The Fabulous Flight of the Three Musketeers: A Rollicking Airplane Adventure With a Few Thrills. Charleston, South Carolina: BookSurge Publishing. 2009. ISBN 978-1-4392-3151-7.
- Sky Girls: The True Story of the First Women's Cross-Country Air Race. Naperville, Illinois: Sourcebooks. 2018. ISBN 978-1-4926-6447-5.
