= Jerri Sloan Truhill =

American aviator (1929–2013)

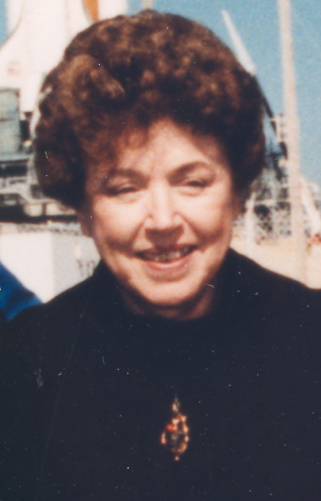
- Born: Geraldine Hamilton Sloan Truhill; November 12, 1929
- Died: November 18, 2013 (aged 84)
- Known for: Part of the Mercury 13

Geraldine Hamilton Sloan Truhill (November 12, 1929 – November 18, 2013) was an American aviator. She was part of the Mercury 13, the group of women who underwent the same physiological tests as the Mercury Seven during the same time frame. She served as the Vice President for Air Freighters International and Air Services, Inc. Truhill died on November 18, 2013.

== Early life ==
Truhill was first exposed to aviation a young age, but due to the restrictive views on women pilots during the era, she was often discouraged from pursuing the career. When she was 15, she began taking flying lessons without the knowledge of her parents. After this was discovered, she was sent to a Catholic School in San Antonio, Texas.

== Aviation career and Mercury 13 ==
Truhill spent much of her time based out of Dallas, Texas, where she began a partnership with Joe Truhill, who she would eventually marry. She and Joe flew North American B-25's under Texas Instruments, Incorporated. Through this, she helped to develop Terrain Following Radar (TFR) and smart bombs. Truhill also participated in numerous Air Races.

In 1961, she got a call from friend Jerrie Cobb, asking for her interest in a secret government project, which would turn out to be the Women in Space Program run by Dr. William Randolph Lovelace, who ran an astronaut testing center for NASA in Albuquerque, N.M. Through Dr. Lovelace, the women went through the same Mercury era testing as the men.

After the program was halted, the Truhills bought and flew a P-51 Mustang, during which she also modeled a pink lycra flight suit for Monsanto. She bought a house in Richardson, where she lived until her death.

== She Should Have Gone to the Moon ==
Truhill was the subject of the 2008 documentary She Should Have Gone to the Moon which was based upon a series of lengthy conversations between Truhill and director Ulrike Kubatta in which she tells the story of the Mercury 13 programme in her own words and from her own point of view. The interviews are augmented, supported and illustrated by archive footage and stylised reconstruction sequences. Truhill recounts details of her training, and that of other women trainees, reflects on the achievements of American female pilots and astronauts (notably ignoring Soviet women such as Valentina Tereshkova), and on her personal story including her pre-Mercury 13 work with flight testing new equipment for Texas Instruments up to and during the Bay of Pigs incident, and her personally confronting Lyndon Johnson at a fundraiser to challenge the cessation of the Women in Space programme.
