= Marion Dietrich =

American aviator

- Born: July 18, 1926; San Francisco, California, U.S.
- Died: December 1, 1974 (aged 48)
- Education: University of California, Berkeley
- Occupation: Pilot
- Space career
- Missions: None

Marion Findlay Dietrich (July 28, 1926 – December 1, 1974) was an American pilot and one of the Mercury 13 who underwent the same NASA testing in the early 1960s as the Mercury 7 astronauts.

== Biography ==
Born in San Francisco in 1926, Dietrich was the daughter of Richard Dietrich, who worked in the import business, and his wife Marion. Dietrich began flying at an early age, getting a student pilot certificate at age 16. She and identical twin sister Janet Dietrich were the only girls in an aviation class at Burlingame High School.

In 1947, Marion Dietrich and her sister Janet entered the inaugural Chico-to-San Mateo Air Race and took first place, defeating experienced men. Dietrich graduated from the University of California, Berkeley in 1949, with degrees in mathematics and psychology. After placing in other local races, the flying twins collected the second-place trophy in the 1951 All-Women's Transcontinental Air Race, known as the Powder Puff Derby. Dietrich worked for a time as a newspaper reporter for the Oakland Tribune, flying supersonic as a passenger in a fighter aircraft on a story assignment. She also became a commercial transport pilot, flying charter and ferry flights.

In 1960, Dietrich and her sister were among a select group of female aviators invited to the Lovelace Clinic in Albuquerque, where experts had screened potential NASA astronauts. The women underwent the same medical tests and examinations as Alan Shepard, John Glenn, and the other men who eventually traveled into space. The extensive exams included everything from swallowing three feet of rubber hose to drinking radioactive water. Though only 5 feet 3 inches tall and 100 pounds, Dietrich completed the regimen of tests, as did her sister and 11 other women.

While the women waited for the next phase of their program in July 1961, the testing was halted without warning or explanation. It would be two more decades before the United States launched its first woman into space, Sally Ride, an astrophysicist turned astronaut.

Dietrich died in 1974 from cancer.

In 2006, the International Women's Air & Space Museum opened an exhibit honoring the Mercury 13 – Mercury Women: Forgotten Link to the Future. In May 2007, the Mercury 13 received honorary doctor of science degrees from the University of Wisconsin-Oshkosh.
