= Janet Dietrich =

American pilot

- Born: July 28, 1926; San Francisco, California, US
- Died: June 5, 2008 (aged 81); San Francisco, California, US
- Known for: Part of the Mercury 13

Janet Christine Dietrich (July 28, 1926 – June 5, 2008) was an American pilot and one of the Mercury 13 who underwent the same NASA testing in the early 1960s as the Mercury 7 astronauts.

== Early life ==
Born in San Francisco in 1926, Janet Dietrich (better known as Jan) was the daughter of Richard Dietrich, who worked in the import business, and his wife, Marion. Dietrich began flying at an early age, getting a student pilot certificate at age 16. Jan and her identical twin sister Marion were the only girls in an aviation class at Burlingame High School. As an undergraduate at UC Berkeley, Dietrich was president of the UC Flying Club and trained at Oakland International Airport, where she earned her Private pilot licence in 1946.

In 1947, Janet Dietrich and her sister Marion entered the inaugural Chico-to-San Mateo Air Race and took first place, defeating experienced men. After placing in other local races, the flying twins collected the second-place trophy in the 1951 All-Women's Transcontinental Air Race, known as the Powder Puff Derby. They also competed in the following year's race, flying a Stinson Voyager loaned to them by one of her student pilots, Donald Prell.

Soon after graduating from Cal in 1949, Dietrich became chief pilot of Cessna. In her job, Dietrich delivered multi-engine aircraft from the factory in Wichita, conducted test flights for the shop, flew charters, and supervised the flight and ground schools. In 1953 she was the chief pilot of Santa Monica Flyers, a flight school in Santa Monica, California.

In the late 1950s, Dietrich worked as the head of the Flight Department for Air Oasis Company at the Long Beach Airport, and she mentions having this position in her appearance on the January 31, 1957, episode of You Bet Your Life—indeed, she uses the secret word "head" in identifying her position, but Groucho Marx's assistants did not notice. Later, she was a federal pilot examiner for the Federal Aviation Administration, performing pilot evaluations and issuing certificates.

Dietrich also appeared on the program What's My Line February 22, 1959 where Dorothy Kilgallen successfully guessed she was a pilot.

== Woman in Space program ==
In 1960, Dietrich and her sister were among a select group of female aviators invited to the Lovelace Clinic in Albuquerque, where experts had screened potential NASA astronauts. The women underwent the same medical tests and examinations as Alan Shepherd, John Glenn, and the other men who eventually traveled into space. The extensive exams included everything from swallowing 3 feet of rubber hose to drinking radioactive water. Though only 5 feet 3 inches tall and 100 pounds, Dietrich completed the regimen of tests, as did her sister and 11 other women. While the women waited for the next phase of their program in July 1961, the testing was halted without warning or explanation. It would be two more decades before the United States launched its first woman into space, Sally Ride, an astrophysicist turned astronaut.

== Later career ==
In 1960, Dietrich became the nation's first woman to earn an Airline Transport Pilot License, the highest Federal Aviation Administration license, followed by a career of commercial flying that lasted well into the 1970s. Dietrich would work for World Airways, an Oakland corporation that became a key military contractor during the Vietnam War. In that capacity she piloted regular flights between the war zone and World's base at Oakland International Airport. However, the death of her twin sister in 1974 brought Dietrich's piloting career to an end.

In 2006, the International Women's Air & Space Museum opened an exhibit honoring the Mercury 13 – Mercury Women: Forgotten Link to the Future. And in May 2007, the women of Mercury 13 received honorary doctor of science degrees from the University of Wisconsin-Oshkosh. Over a 34-year aviation career, Dietrich accumulated more than 12,000 hours in the pilot seat. Neither she nor her sister were ever married. Dietrich died on June 5, 2008, in San Francisco of natural causes at the age of 81.
