= Sarah Gorelick =

American pilot (1933–2020)

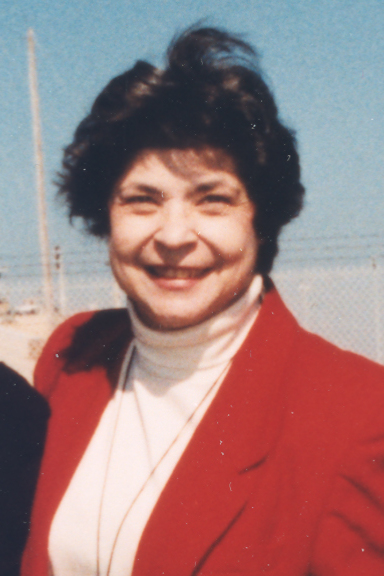
- Ratley in 1995
- Born: Sarah Lee Gorelick; August 30, 1933; Kansas City, Kansas, U.S.
- Died: March 17, 2020 (aged 86)
- Known for: Mercury 13, aviation

Sarah Ratley (née Gorelick; August 30, 1933 – March 17, 2020) was an American pilot and one of the Mercury 13 female astronauts group.

== Biography ==
Born in Kansas City, Kansas, Gorelick learned to fly in 1949 and raced in the Powder Puff Derby and toured with the Ninety-Nines. She graduated from the University of Denver with a Bachelors of Science in Mathematics, minoring in physics, chemistry and aeronautics, then worked as an engineer at AT&T.

During a tour of Europe she heard about a space research program which produced the Mercury 13, and was invited to take part upon her return. This program, developed in 1961, was NASA's first Women in Space Program. It was geared toward investigating women's capabilities in space due to their biological differences from men.

She underwent invasive testing, including freezing the inner ear with ice water to induce vertigo. She said of the experience, "The tests didn't bother me at all [...] When you are young you can take anything. My mind was made up: I was going to pass."

After the Mercury 13, Gorelick became an accountant with the Internal Revenue Service and in 2007 received an honorary Doctorate of Science from the University of Wisconsin.

Gorelick died on March 17, 2020.
