= Rhea Woltman =

American aviator (1928–2021)

- Born: Rhea Hurrle; November 6, 1928; Lynden Township, Stearns County, Minnesota, U.S.
- Died: February 15, 2021 (aged 92); St. Augusta, Minnesota, U.S.
- Occupations: Aviator, educator
- Known for: Mercury 13
- Spouse(s): William Jean Allison (m. 1962; died 1966) Leonard Woltman (m. 1972; died 1990)

Rhea Hurrle Allison Woltman (November 6, 1928 – February 15, 2021) was an American pilot and one of the Mercury 13.

== Early life ==
Woltman was born in Lynden County, Minnesota as third of six children to Ellanora and Leo Hurrle, who had a farm near South Haven. From a young age, Woltman had always wanted to fly.

== Career ==
Woltman attended the St. Cloud Teacher's College after school. After a few years of teaching, she moved to Texas and started training as a pilot.

Her first plane was a Piper J-3 Cub and then she progressed from a private pilot to a commercial pilot. This earned her rating as an instructor for flying airplanes. Woltman attained her seaplane rating for airplanes with floats and her rating as a glider pilot. She flew competitively, and she also completed one of the major flights of the era for women, a solo flight from Houston to Anchorage in a Piper Super Cub with floats. Working as a charter pilot, Woltman flew over North America and also flew in the International Women's Air Race and in the Powder Puff Race.

In March 1961, Woltman started training as an astronaut. She cleared all physical tests and was a part of the First Lady Astronaut Trainees (FLATs). As next steps, few from the group of 13 went to advanced testing but since the project was not officially run by NASA, Woltman never stepped into the space.

She was one of the thirteen women who passed all of the astronaut tests given at the Lovelace Clinic in 1961, making her a member of the Mercury 13.

Woltman retired her pilot license in March 2014.

In 2007, the University of Wisconsin conferred on Woltman and the remaining Mercury 13 astronauts an Honorary Doctorate in Aeronautics, honoring them as pioneers in aviation history. She was inducted in the Colorado Women's Hall of Fame in 2008.

== After Mercury 13 ==
Mercury 13 never reached their goal after the U.S. government shut down the women's program without their ever being able to fly a space mission. Woltman moved to Colorado Springs in the early 1970s, where she did glider training and towing for Air Force Academy cadets at the Black Forest Glider Port. Woltman was also one of a few professional registered Parliamentarians in the country and worked with the board of directors of major organizations such as the American Lung Association and the American Heart Association.

== Personal life ==
Woltman was married to aircraft businessman William Jean Allison from 1962 until his death in 1966. She then married Leonard Woltman in 1972 after moving to Colorado Springs. Woltman died in 1990.

Woltman died on February 15, 2021 in St. Augusta, Minnesota at the age of 92.
