= Walter Briggs Sr. =

American entrepreneur and professional sports owner

Walter O. Briggs Sr.
- Born: Walter Owen Briggs; February 27, 1877; Ypsilanti, Michigan, U.S.
- Died: January 17, 1952 (aged 74); Miami Beach, Florida, U.S.
- Burial place: Holy Sepulchre Cemetery
- Occupation: Automobile body manufacturer
- Known for: Owner of the Detroit Tigers
- Children: 3, including Walter Jr. and Jane

Walter Owen Briggs Sr. (February 27, 1877 – January 17, 1952) was an American entrepreneur and professional sports owner. He was part-owner of the Detroit Tigers in Major League Baseball from 1919 to 1935, and then sole owner from 1935 to his death in 1952. Briggs also helped fund the Detroit Zoo in 1928, and personally paid for many of its first exhibits. He was also a patron of Eastern Michigan University and the Detroit Symphony Orchestra.

== Biography ==
Briggs was born on February 27, 1877, in Ypsilanti, Michigan, to Rodney D. Briggs and Ada Warner. He followed the Detroit Tigers from the time he was young. In his early youth he worked at the Michigan Central Railroad and later opened Briggs Manufacturing Company in 1908, which specialized in the manufacturing of automobile bodies for the auto industry and later diversified into plumbing fixtures.

After the death of Tigers' part-owner Bill Yawkey in 1919, surviving partner Frank Navin arranged for Briggs and industrialist John Kelsey to buy a 25 percent stake in the club. Briggs had long chafed at not being able to see the Tigers play the Chicago Cubs in the 1908 World Series; he saw his stake in the Tigers as a way to ensure he would never have to worry about getting a seat to a game again. In 1927, Briggs bought Kelsey's stake to become a full partner with Navin, though he stayed in the background while Navin was alive. After Navin died in 1935, Briggs became the sole owner of the franchise.

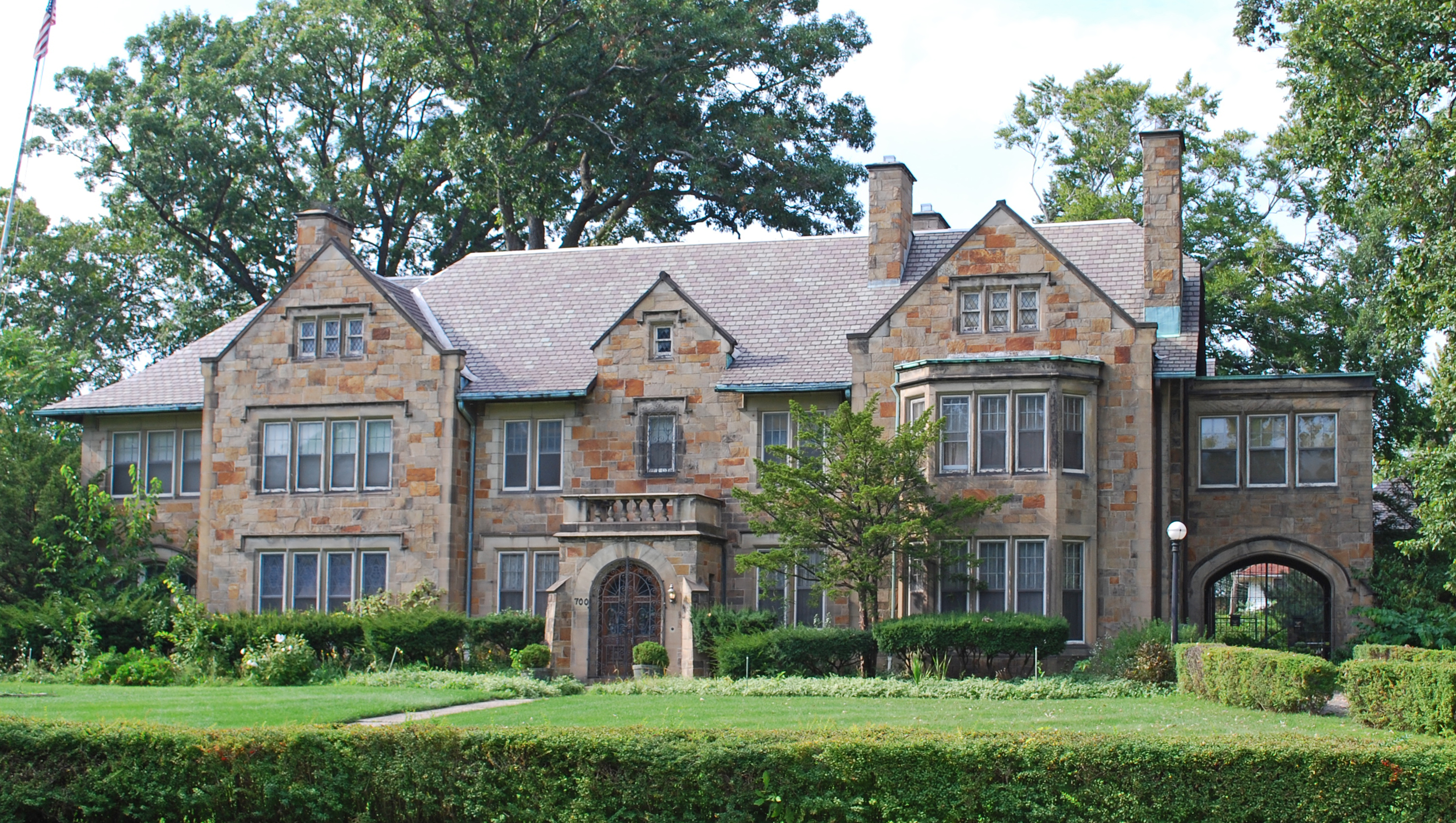
Walter O. Briggs House, "Stonehedge", in Boston-Edison Historic District, Alpheus W. Chittenden and Charles D. Kotting, architects

As owner, among Briggs' first actions was completing major renovation and expansion plans to Navin Field, then seating 23,000. He double-decked the grandstand and converted the park into a bowl. It reopened in 1938 as Briggs Stadium, with a seating capacity of 58,000. The stadium was later renamed Tiger Stadium.

Briggs was noted for fielding a well-paid team that won two American League pennants (1940, 1945) and a World Series championship in 1945 under his ownership. He had a reputation for being prejudiced against African Americans, in part because he refused to sign black players and would only allow black fans to sit in inferior obstructed-view sections at Briggs Stadium. While he employed blacks at his factory, they were subjected to pervasive discrimination and less-than-ideal working conditions. The Tigers did not field their first non-white player until 1958, six years after Briggs' death, making them the second-to-last team in the majors to integrate (ahead of only the Boston Red Sox).

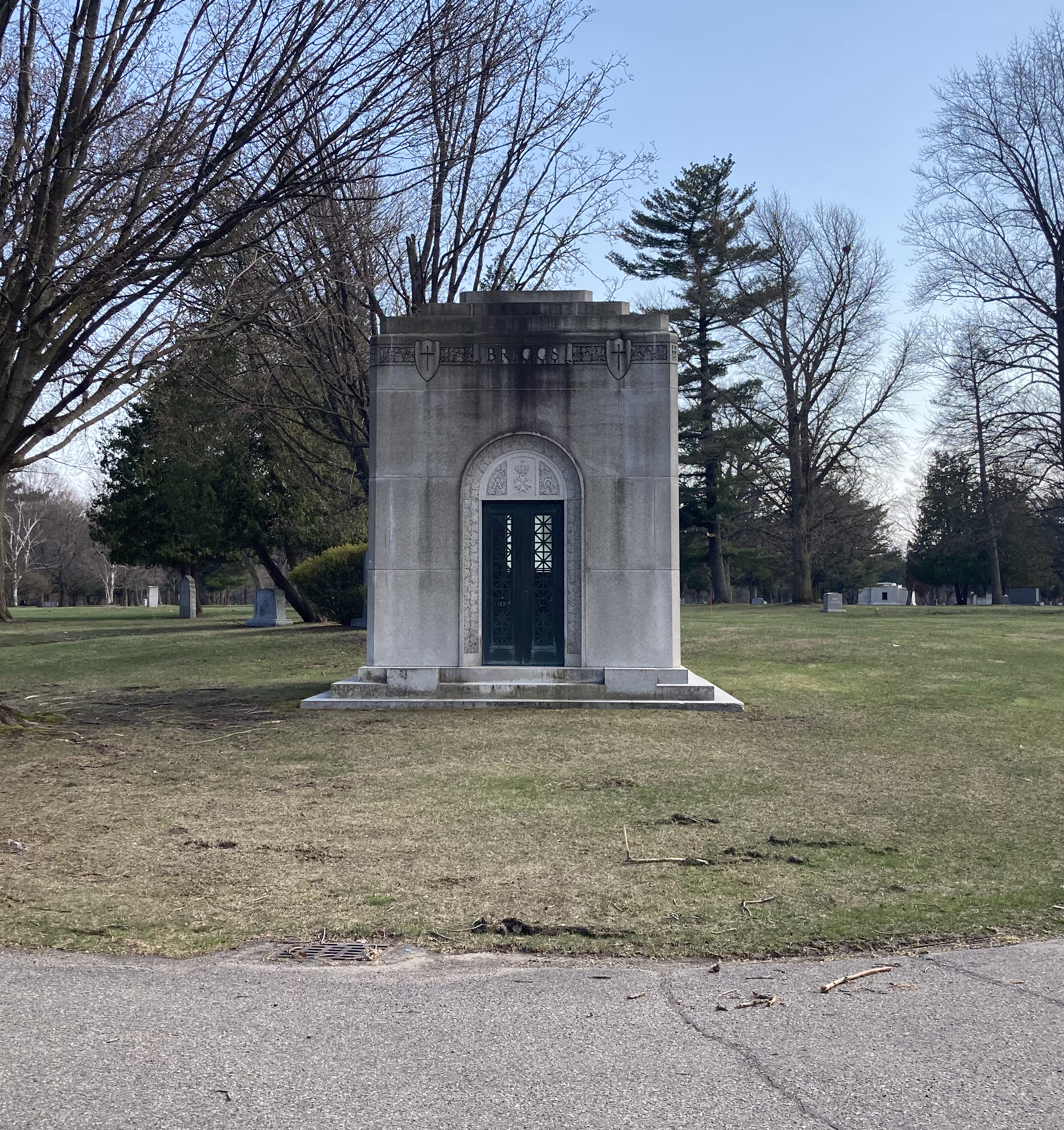
Briggs mausoleum at Holy Sepulchre Cemetery

Briggs died at age 74 in Miami Beach, Florida, on January 17, 1952. He was interred at Holy Sepulchre Cemetery in Southfield, Michigan.

== Legacy ==
His son, Walter Briggs Jr., briefly inherited the Tigers before a court forced him to sell the team in 1956.

His daughter, Jane Briggs Hart was known as an aviator and in the 1960s, became one of the Mercury 13, women who qualified physically in the same tests as those used for male astronauts. She died in 2015.

In a 2017 op-ed for the Detroit Free Press, Briggs' great-grandson, Harvey Briggs, publicly apologized for Walter's racism in his capacity as Tigers' owner. Harvey wrote that for all the good his great-grandfather might have done for Detroit, "I cannot overlook one fact. He was a racist." Harvey added that his opposition to Donald Trump came from the need to acknowledge his family's racist past.

Briggs was also opposed to night baseball, only installing lights at Briggs Stadium in 1948 as a result of television's arrival in Michigan. Even today, nearly half of the Tigers' home games, including almost every Thursday and April home game, are day games. Only the Chicago Cubs, who installed lights forty years later, play more day games.

== See also ==
- Detroit Tigers/Managers and ownership
