= Fiber type =

Fiber type may refer to:

- Fiber (disambiguation)
- Axon
- Skeletal muscle
