= Fighting for Space =

2020 non-fiction book by Amy Shira Teitel

- Author: Amy Shira Teitel
- Cover artist: Phil Pascuzzo
- Language: English
- Published: February 18, 2020
- Publisher: Grand Central Publishing
- Publication place: United States
- Pages: 370
- ISBN: 978-1-5387-1604-5

Fighting for Space: Two Pilots and Their Historic Battle for Female Spaceflight is a nonfiction book by Amy Shira Teitel published in 2020.

== Summary ==
Fighting for Space presents the intertwined biographies of two pilots, Jacqueline Cochran and Jerrie Cobb, and their competing visions of women in the space program.

== Reception ==
In The Space Review, Jeff Foust says "Teitel certainly brings to life these two pioneering women who had similar visions, but conflicting views of how to realize them." Foust takes issue with the lack of footnotes and Teitel's reluctance to address inconsistencies between claims made by the women and historical evidence.

Ethan Siegel, astrophysicist and science writer, says the book is "incredibly well-researched" and "what's perhaps most breathtaking about the book is the sheer number of long-buried letters and correspondences that Teitel has unearthed and reproduced in full."

The Library Journal describes it as an "inspiring story" and an "awe-inducing biography that space junkies, feminists, and historians will eat up." Fighting for Space was a Library Journal Top Pick in women's history. Kirkus Reviews described it as a "well-researched contribution to women's and aviation history."

== See also ==
- Mercury 13
