= Walter Briggs Jr. =

American baseball executive (1912-1970)

Spike Briggs
- Born: Walter Owen Briggs Jr. January 20, 1912; Detroit, Michigan, U.S.
- Died: July 3, 1970 (aged 58); Detroit, Michigan, U.S.
- Occupation: Baseball executive
- Parent: Walter Briggs Sr.

Walter Owen "Spike" Briggs Jr. (January 20, 1912 – July 3, 1970) was an American Major League Baseball executive. He was the owner of the Detroit Tigers for five seasons following the death of his father, industrialist Walter Briggs Sr., in 1952.

Born in Detroit, Michigan, Briggs was educated at Canterbury School and graduated from Georgetown University in 1934. He joined the family business, Briggs Manufacturing Company (maker of automobile bodies), and interrupted his business career to serve as a lieutenant in the United States Army Air Forces during World War II. He also had become a vice president of the Tigers before the war.

== Owner of Detroit Tigers (1952–1956) ==
=== On the field: Rebuilding ===
Walter Briggs Sr.'s death on January 17, 1952, occurred as the Tigers were entering one of the lower points in their five-decade-old history. The 1951 team had finished a disappointing 73–81, in fifth place and 25 games behind the New York Yankees. But the 1952 edition fared even worse, losing 104 games, and finishing eighth and last in the American League—the first time the Tigers had ever reached those dubious milestones since entering the league in 1901.

Four seasons of decided improvement followed, until the 1956 squad won 82 games under manager Bucky Harris. During that time, future Baseball Hall of Famers Al Kaline and Jim Bunning and eight-year All-Star Harvey Kuenn made their debuts.

=== Off the field: Torturous sale process ===
However, the senior Briggs' passing also triggered a four-year process that ultimately forced a sale of the team during 1956. Ownership of the Tigers passed in 1952 into a trust for Spike Briggs and his three sisters, with Briggs and the Detroit Bank & Trust Company named as executors. However, Detroit Bank & Trust persuaded a court to order the Tigers sold, believing it was "not a prudent investment" for Walter Sr.'s grandchildren. Spike Briggs made multiple attempts to organize an ownership group to purchase the Tigers from the trust. One group, which included Henry Ford II, broke apart before making a bid.

In September 1955, Briggs assembled a syndicate which included Tiger great and Baseball Hall of Famer Charlie Gehringer that bid $3.5 million to buy the Tigers from the trust; Spike Briggs held 46 percent of the syndicate's shares. However, his four sisters balked at selling the team to their brother due to concern about his hard living, particularly his heavy drinking. Their decision created a rift in the family, and opened up a bidding process which saw a group of 11 Michigan businessmen, led by radio executives John Fetzer and Fred Knorr, purchase the Tigers for $5.2 million in July 1956, with the sale due to close October 1. The sale represented a handsome return on Walter Sr.'s purchase of his stake in the Tigers in 1919; he became a full partner with longtime owner Frank Navin in 1927 and full owner upon Navin's death in 1935. But, during the summer of 1956, Spike Briggs made headlines from his scathing criticism of his team, manager Harris, and the Tiger coaching staff. His outburst drove one of Harris' coaches, Joe Gordon, also a future Hall of Famer, to immediately resign. (He would return to briefly manage Detroit in August and September of 1960).

Knorr and Fetzer had promised to retain Briggs if their bid was successful. Accordingly, when the Knorr/Fetzer group closed on their purchase, they named Briggs executive vice president, and prior to the 1957 campaign, he also became general manager. Despite this, a clash between the boisterous Briggs and the more restrained Fetzer was inevitable. Fetzer forced Briggs' resignation from both posts in April 1957, after Briggs clashed with the board over the choice of Harris' successor in the Bengal dugout. His tenure as owner and general manager saw the continuation of the Tigers' policy of enforcing the baseball color line; when the team fielded its first black player, Ozzie Virgil Sr., on June 6, 1958, it became the 15th of the then-16 MLB teams to integrate its playing roster.

Briggs died at age 58 in Detroit after a prolonged period of ill health. He was survived by his wife, three children, sisters, and 13 grandchildren. One of his brothers-in-law was United States Senator Philip Hart.

Preceded by Muddy Ruel	Detroit Tigers General Manager; 1957	Succeeded by John McHale
