= Fiber (disambiguation) =

A fiber is a long strand of material.

Fiber or Fibre may also refer to:

== Healthcare ==
- Dietary fiber, the portion of plant-derived food that cannot be completely digested
- Myofiber, or muscle fiber, strands of muscle tissue
- Nerve fiber, strands of nervous tissue

== Mathematics and technology ==
- Fiber (computer science), a type of programmed instructions to a computer
- Fiber (mathematics), the set of all points in a function's domain that all map to a single given point
- Fiber laser (or fibre laser), a laser in which the active gain medium is an optical fiber doped with rare-earth elements
- Google Fiber, part of the Access division of Alphabet Inc.; provides fiber-to-the-premises service (i.e., broadband Internet and IPTV) in the United States
- Optical fiber, type of material that can transmit light over distances
  - Fiber-optic communication, process of using optical fiber to transmitting communications from one place to another

== Places ==
- Fibre, Michigan, an unincorporated community in the United States

== Other uses ==
- Fiber crop, plants grown for their fiber (which is then generally used in manufacturing various products)
- Moral fiber, a term used to describe the strength of a person's moral character
- Natural fiber, a type of fiber obtained from natural sources (such as plants, animals, or minerals) without synthesis
- Synthetic fiber, artificially manufactured fibers
