= Mercury 13 (film) =

Documentary film about early women astronauts

- Directed by: David Sington; Heather Walsh
- Produced by: David Sington; Heather Walsh; Trevor Birney; Brendan Byrne; Geraldine Creed
- Cinematography: Nickolas Dylan Rossi
- Edited by: David Fairhead; Paul Holland
- Music by: Philip Sheppard
- Production company: Netflix
- Distributed by: Netflix
- Release date: 2018
- Language: English

Mercury 13 is a 2018 documentary film about the Mercury 13, thirteen American women pilots who in 1960 took and passed the same tests given the previous year to the Mercury 7, the astronauts selected by NASA for Project Mercury.

== Critical reception ==
The review aggregator website Rotten Tomatoes assigned the film an approval rating of 100% based on 24 reviews, with an average rating of 7.4/10. The site's consensus reads: "Mercury 13 offers yet another sobering example of how institutionalized sexism has thwarted countless dreams -- and held nations back from their full potential."

== See also ==
- List of films with a 100% rating on Rotten Tomatoes
