= Amy Shira Teitel =

American-Canadian popular science writer

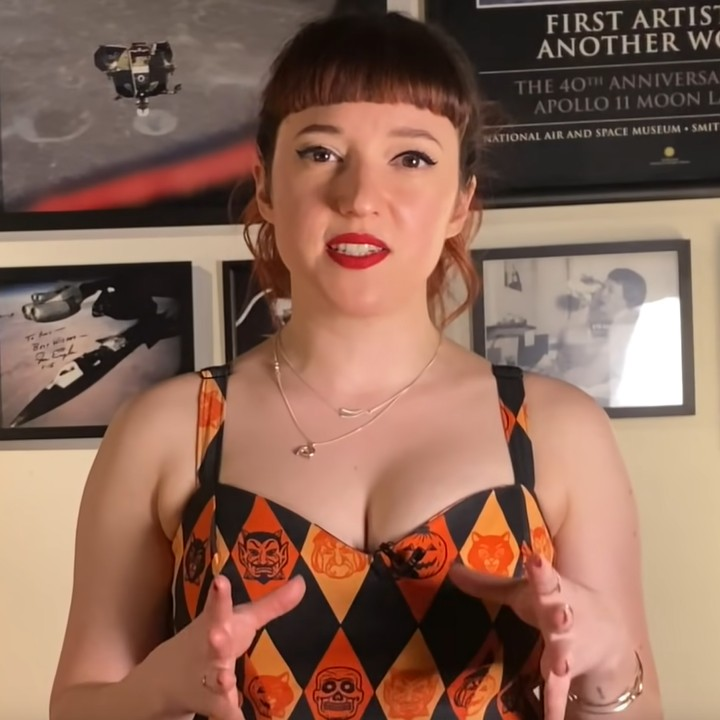
- Teitel in 2020
- Born: Toronto, Ontario, Canada
- Education: University of King's College (BA); York University (MA)
- Occupations: Popular science writer, journalist

YouTube information
- Channel: The Vintage Space
- Subscribers: 461 thousand
- Views: 72.9 million
- Last updated: 23 April 2026
- Website: amyshirateitel.com

Amy Shira Teitel is a Canadian-American author, popular science writer, historian, and YouTuber.

== Career ==
=== Writer ===
Amy Shira Teitel is a native of Toronto. She has written for The Daily Beast, National Geographic, Discovery News, Scientific American, Ars Technica, and Al Jazeera English.

Teitel's first book was based on research for her master's degree thesis. Breaking the Chains of Gravity (2015) tells the story of America's nascent space program. The book describes the early pioneers of rockets in the late 1920s, up to the formation of NASA.

Teitel's Fighting for Space (2020) is a dual biography of female pilots Jacqueline Cochran and Jerrie Cobb.

In August 2025, Teitel announced she was working on a book about the history of the atomic bomb, with an expected publication of 2027.

=== Video and other media ===
In 2012, Teitel created a YouTube channel, The Vintage Space, in which she delves into the history of space flight. The channel took a hiatus from 2021 to 2024, with Teitel taking time away after the publication of her second book, alongside challenges with YouTube comments and copyright-related demonetization. Upon returning in July 2024, she stating that the channel's focus would expand to the space age rather than strictly spaceflight.

Teitel was a co-host for the Discovery Channel's online DNews channel, which later became Seeker. She has also appeared on Ancient Aliens, NASA's Unexplained Files, and other cable documentary shows.

== Bibliography ==
- Teitel, Amy Shira (2015). Breaking the Chains of Gravity: The Story of Spaceflight before NASA. London: Bloomsbury Sigma. ISBN 978-1-4729-1119-3. OCLC 926935409.
- Teitel, Amy Shira (2020). Fighting for Space: Two Pilots and Their Historic Battle for Female Spaceflight. New York: Grand Central Publishing. ISBN 978-1-5387-1603-8. OCLC 1141078934.
