= Lovelace Respiratory Research Institute =

Research organization in New Mexico, US

Lovelace Biomedical Research Institute
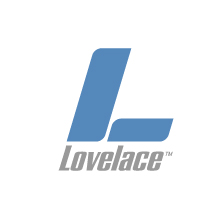
- Established: 1947
- Research type: Respiratory Disease, Toxicology, Gene Therapy, Bioanalysis, Neuroscience, Infectious Diseases, Medical Countermeasures, Biotechnology, Drug Research
- Budget: US$65 million
- President: Robert W. Rubin
- Staff: 83 PhD level scientists, 539 technicians and support staff
- Location: Albuquerque, New Mexico
- Campus: 500,000 square feet
- Operating agency: Lovelace Biomedical & Touro University

Lovelace Biomedical Research Institute is a private contract research organization that is part of Touro University and New York Medical College (NYMC). It was founded after WWII in Albuquerque, New Mexico by two physicians, William Randolph Lovelace I and his nephew, surgeon William Randolph Lovelace II. LRRI originally performed not-for-profit biomedical research into the prevention, treatment and cure of respiratory disease. The organization expanded with military grants into the research and development of CBRNe, setting up a lab inside Kirtland Air Force Base, preclinical contract research for drug development, clinical trials and in 1998, the study of mental illness by providing neuroimaging and big data analysis with machine learning.

The U.S. Department of Agriculture (USDA) found LRRI violated the Animal Welfare Act on multiple occasions since 2008. In 2018, its name appeared in the European dieselgate scandal, as it had tested the health effect of diesel exhaust exposure on monkeys for three German car manufacturers using emissions cheating technology.

In August 2022, it was announced that the Lovelace Research Institute had joined Touro University and New York Medical College (NYMC).

== Business ==
Lovelace Biomedical currently has two main locations, both located in Albuquerque, New Mexico. It employs over 500 staff in New Mexico.

Most of Lovelace's funding comes from the United States government and private grants. As of 2008 it was spending more than $60 million to fight against respiratory diseases such as asthma, emphysema, lung cancer, bronchitis and allergies.

=== Companies ===
As of 2018 Lovelace consists of numerous companies per its website:

- "LBERI", a research and development facility for medical countermeasures against chemical, biological, radiological, nuclear and explosives,(CBRNe) weapons
- "Lovelace Biomedical", which conducts preclinical contract research for drug development, e.g. gene therapies, orphan diseases, infectious diseases and neurological conditions. In 2015 it contracted with the NIEHS, i.e. was funded by the National Toxicology Program
- "LSR Trials" or Lovelace Scientific Resources (LSR) Trials, a clinical trials company with clinical trial sites throughout the United States.
- "LSR Diagnostics" through Mako Medical Laboratories.
- "Mind Research Network", founded in 1998 to study addiction, mental illness, with neuroimaging like magnetic resonance imaging (MRI) and magnetoencephalogram.
- "MINDSET", which consults on Mind Research Network´s medical imaging, analyzing data across studies
- Lovelace Intelligent Systems, which was founded in 2002 and creates software for laboratory animal management, tracking of employees and external personnel skill sets and training and certifications.
- "Salzman Lovelace Investments", which is a joint venture investment company with the Salzman group
- "Datalytic Solutions", which conducts spatial and temporal data analysis, stochastic optimization, machine learning, automatic representation learning by deep learning models, statistics, software development, server and web development
- Collaborative Informatics and Networking Solutions (COINS) offering tools to those who perform or study neuroimaging to manage their data, including participant questionnaires, scheduling, DICOM support, EEG and Magnetoencephalography sessions

== Controversies ==
Between March 2008 and April 2009 the U.S. Department of Agriculture (USDA) found LRRI violated the Animal Welfare Act on nine occasions, including the death of a monkey, and escape of another monkey. In 2011, LRRI was fined close to $22,000, and in 2015, federal inspectors reported that it investigated because an untrained technician’s actions resulted in the death of a research dog. From August 2012 to March 2014, the DOA found that five monkeys and four rabbits died at LRRI, violating the federal Animal Welfare Act six times. In 2012, Lovelace reduced the number of monkeys from 951 to 646, the number of dogs from 293 to 183 within a short period per USDA animal inventory reports. As of 2014, Lovelace still used 431 primates and outnumbered all US institutions performing primate experiments like Battelle Memorial Institute (270) or USAMRIID (249).

In January 2018, the NYT reported that in 2014, the LRRI studied the health effect of up to four hours of diesel exhaust exposure on 10 monkeys. An organization called the European Research Group on Environment and Health in the Transport Sector (EUGT) paid for the research, and was jointly funded by Volkswagen, Daimler and BMW. The LRRI declined an interview, but confirmed conducting animal testing in a statement that said scientists unknowingly tested exhaust of an emissions cheating vehicle built by Volkswagen and that it was "nearly duped into ‘compromised’ Volkswagen diesel research". The study has not been published yet.

== Founding history ==
The Lovelace Respiratory Research Institute traces its roots to the arrival of William Randolph Lovelace I to Sunnyside-Fort Sumner New Mexico in 1906 as a company physician for the Santa Fe Railroad and a construction project with the Lantry Sharp Construction Company. He sought the Southwest because he was advised to live in a dry, sunny climate to cure his tuberculosis. Lovelace aspired to develop a multispecialty clinical center. In 1912, Albuquerque had become New Mexico´s largest city and in 1913, Lovelace moved to Albuquerque to establish a private practice which became the Lovelace Clinic, the Southwest's first center of specialty medicine, specifically treating tuberculosis.

In 1908, his extended family, including his brother Edgar and Edgar's infant son, William Randolph Lovelace II (Randy), moved to New Mexico. In 1934, this nephew received his M.D. from Harvard University, was appointed Chief of Surgery at Mayo Clinic and in 1946 after his two sons succumbed to polio, he and his wife moved back to Albuquerque. He joined his uncle´s medical clinic on the condition, that the clinic expand to the three-part mission of not only health care, but also research, and education. The nonprofit Lovelace Foundation for Medical Education and Research was founded with Lovelace´s friend Clayton Sam White as director and after 1965, its president until 1974. Don Kilgore was director of clinical medicine at the foundation from 1965 onward.

Through grants from the United States government agencies and private companies, multiple properties were purchased in the Southeast corner of Albuquerque, one of which is currently the site of LRRI's North Campus.

== Notable contracts ==
The Lockheed U-2 pilots were sent to the Lovelace Clinic for a week-long physical examination. "Many of the tests which we pioneered were later made a part of the astronaut's physicals."

In 1959, under a contract to NASA 32 candidate pilots underwent a seven-day series of psychological and physiological tests at Lovelace clinic from which the seven Project Mercury astronauts were selected.

In 1964, the Lovelace Foundation entered a long-term program with the Division of Biology and Medicine of the Atomic Energy Commission to study the effects of inhaling radioactive particles; It set up the Fission Product Inhalation Laboratory inside Kirtland Air Force Base. In the 1970s, the facility was renamed the "Inhalation Toxicology Research Institute" (ITRI) as it studied inhalation of non-radioactive materials. In 1996 it eventually became the Lovelace Respiratory Research Institute" (LRRI).

Currently, LRRI is the nation's largest independent, not-for-profit organization conducting basic and applied research on the causes and treatments of respiratory illness and disease.

== Mission ==
The mission of LRRI is to serve humanity through research on the prevention, treatment, and cure of respiratory disease.

== See also ==
- dieselgate, car makers contracting LRRI
