= Myrtle Cagle =

American pilot and astronaut (1925–2019)

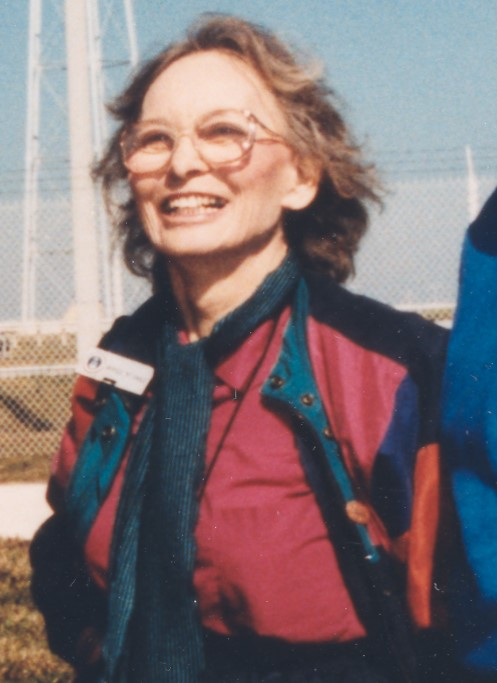
- Myrtle Cagle in 1995
- Born: Myrtle K. Thompson; June 3, 1925
- Died: December 22, 2019 (aged 94); Georgia, United States
- Known for: Mercury 13, aviation

Myrtle "Kay" Thompson Cagle (June 3, 1925 – December 22, 2019) was an American pilot and one of the Mercury 13 female astronauts group. She worked as a flight instructor and wrote about aviation in North Carolina.

== Biography ==
=== Pre-Mercury 13 ===
Cagle was born on June 3, 1925, in Selma, North Carolina. Cagle had always wanted to fly from a young age. When she was 12, her brothers taught her to fly using the plane they owned. When she "earned her wings" at the age of 14, she was the youngest pilot in North Carolina, and at the time, may have been the youngest in the United States. She joined the high school's aeronautics class, when the school's instructor was drafted to fight in World War II, she finished out her year as the teacher. As a flight instructor she was nicknamed, "Captain K". Cagle earned her private pilot's license when she was nineteen.

Cagle joined the Civil Air Patrol and the Ninety-Nines, and wanted to become a WASP. Cagle went on to run an airport near Raleigh and her own charter plane service. In 1950, she earned a trophy in the Powder Puff Derby. She earned her Commercial Pilots license with Airplane Single and Multi-Engine Land ratings and Instrument ratings by 1951. She was also a certified Flight Instructor, Flight Instrument Instructor and Ground Instructor. Her flight school was located in Selma.

Cagle began writing a column called "Air Currents" in 1946 for the Johnstonian Sun newspaper in Selma. Later the column was moved to the Raleigh News and Observer from 1953 to 1960. When she flew a T-33 jet trainer, she became one of only five women who had "ever piloted a jet."

=== Mercury 13 ===
Cagle married former pupil, Walt Cagle, in 1960. Her wedding dress was made from parachutes. She moved to Macon, Georgia, in 1961. Not long after she arrived, she was invited to participate in the new Women in Space Program. Cagle had 4,300 hours of flying time by the time the program started. Cagle and the twelve other women participants eventually became known as the "Mercury 13." During the program, Cagle was warned by the administrators not to become pregnant. Among the multitude of tests she underwent as part of the program, she noted that one of the worst tests she faced was having her eardrums frozen.

=== Post-Mercury 13 ===
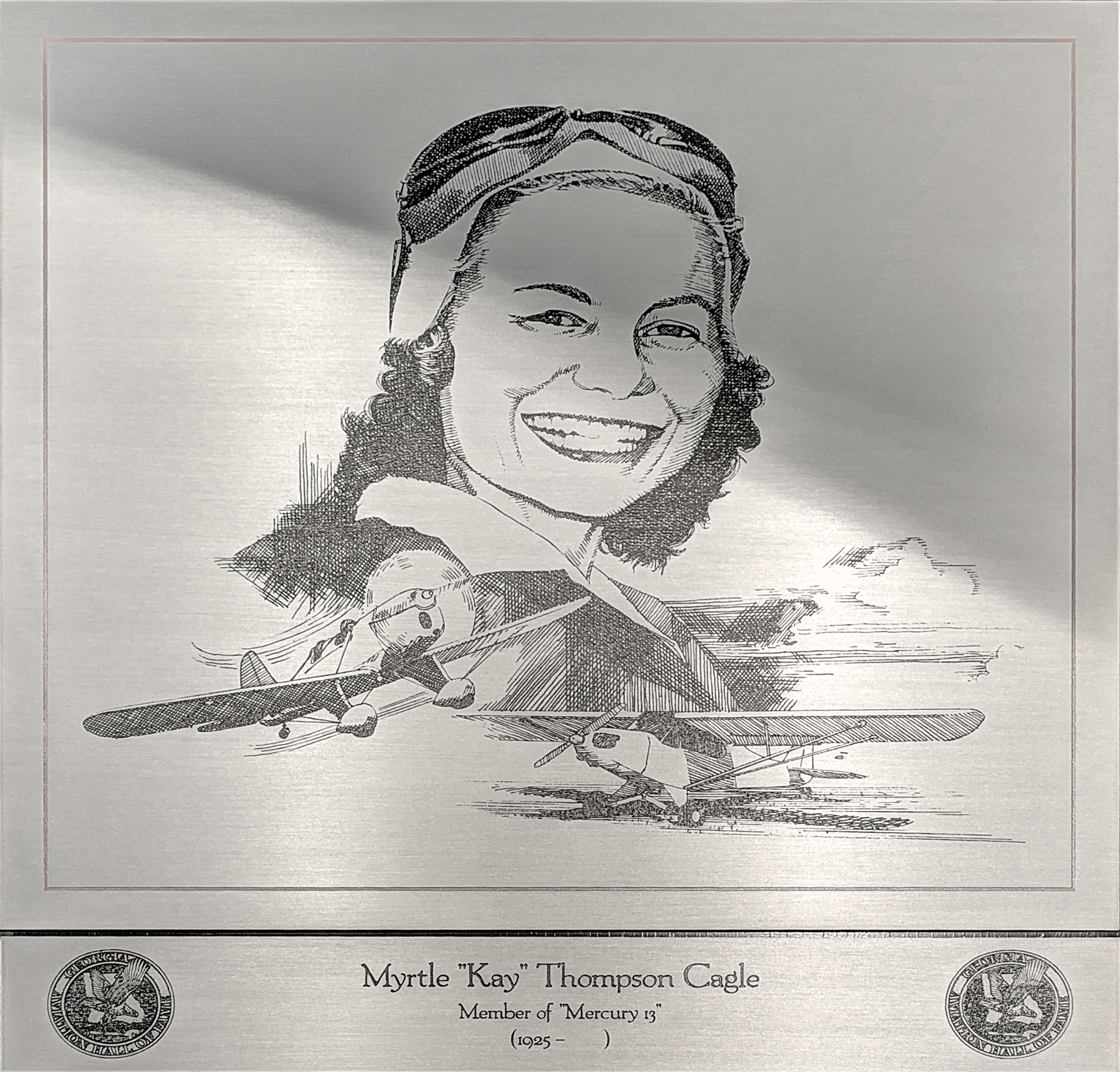
Plaque of Cagle at the Georgia Aviation Hall of Fame

Cagle went back to teaching students how to fly and also enrolled in Mercer University. She continued to be involved in the Civil Air Patrol. In 1964, she competed in the International Women's Air Race. In 1986, she became a member of the Warner Robins Air Logistics Team. In 1988, Cagle became the second woman to graduate with an airframe and powerplant mechanic's rating from the South Georgia Technical College. She was still flying her single-engine Cessna in 1998 at age 73, even though she had retired from teaching at Robins Air Force Base. On April 26, 2003, Cagle was inducted into the Georgia Aviation Hall of Fame. In 2007, she and eight of the Mercury 13 graduates earned an honorary doctorate from the University of Wisconsin, Oshkosh.

== Death ==
Cagle died on December 22, 2019.
