= Bernice Steadman =

American aviator and Mercury 13 astronaut (1925–2015)

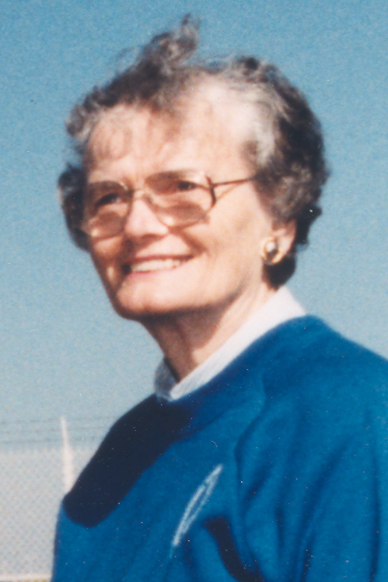
- Steadman in 1995
- Born: Bernice Trimble; July 9, 1925; Rudyard, Michigan, U.S.
- Died: March 18, 2015 (aged 89); Traverse City, Michigan
- Education: Flint Central High School
- Known for: One of the Mercury 13
- Spouse: Robert Steadman (m. 1959)
- Awards: Member of Michigan Women's Hall of Fame

Bernice Steadman (née Trimble; July 9, 1925 – March 18, 2015) was an American aviator and businesswoman. Steadman was one of thirteen women chosen to take the same tests as the astronauts of the Mercury 7 during the early 1960s. The group later became known as the Mercury 13. Steadman and the other twelve women in the program were denied the opportunity to become astronauts due to their gender. Steadman, a professional pilot, later co-founded the International Women's Air & Space Museum in Ohio during the 1980s.

== Biography ==
Steadman was born Bernice Trimble in Rudyard, Michigan in 1925. Her father, sisters, and brother were killed in a fire at their home when she was only one year old. She graduated from Flint Central High School in Flint, Michigan.

She took a job at AC Spark Plug after high school to save money for flight lessons. She obtained her pilot's license before she received a driver's license. She became a charter pilot and eventually opened her own flight school and charter company, Trimble Aviation, based in Flint, Michigan. Steadman trained more than 200 men who ultimately became airline pilots at her school. Bernice Steadman became one of the first women in the United States to obtain an Airline Transport Rating (ATR), the highest rating a pilot can receive.

Steadman was a charter member of the Federal Aviation Agency's (FAA) on women's advisory committee on aviation. She also chaired the Airport Commission in Ann Arbor, Michigan. Steadman was inducted into the Michigan Aviation Hall of Fame in 2002 and the Michigan Women's Hall of Fame in 2003.

In 2001, Steadman published her autobiography, Tethered Mercury: A Pilot's Memoir: The Right Stuff — But the Wrong Sex, detailing her career and the Mercury 13 program. She noted that U.S. President Lyndon B. Johnson had written "Stop This Now" across a document upon learning of the Mercury 13 project.

Bernice Steadman died at her home on Traverse City, Michigan, on March 18, 2015, at the age of 89 following a lengthy battle with Alzheimer's disease.
