= Rudyard Township, Michigan =

- Civil township
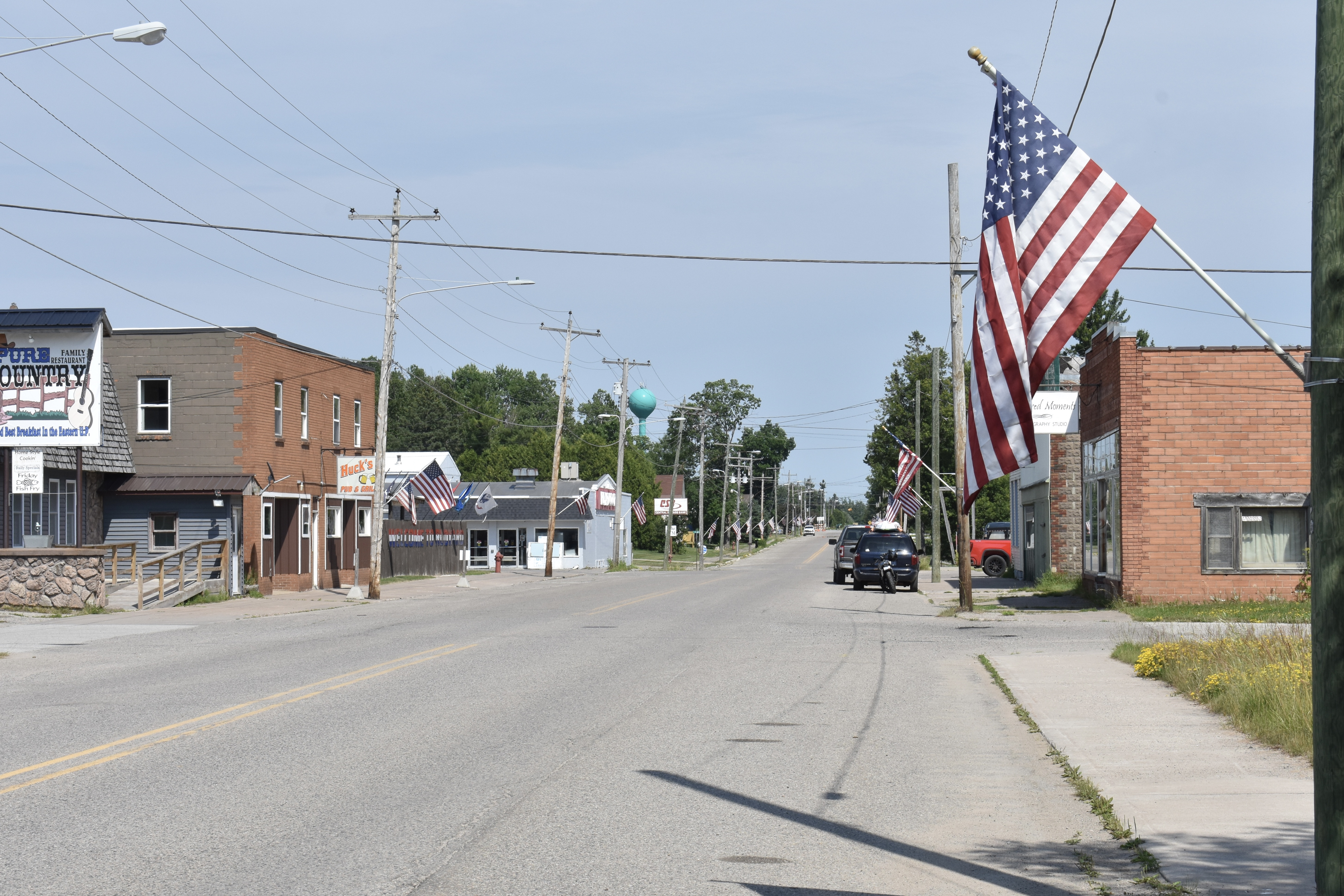
- Rudyard in July 2026
- Nickname: "Snowy Owl Capital of Michigan"
- Motto: Small but Friendly
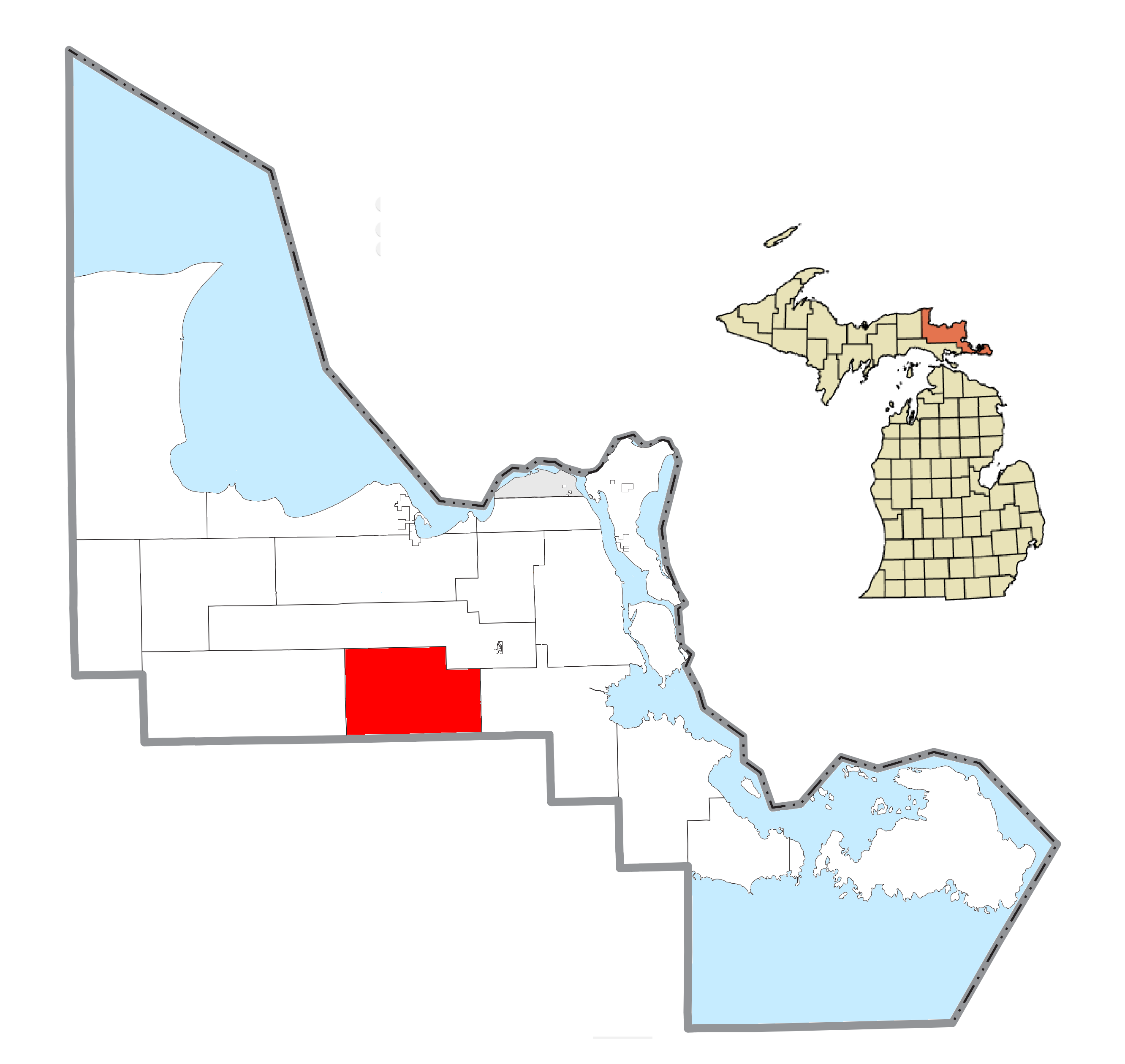
- Location within Chippewa County

- Location within the state of Michigan
- Coordinates: 46°12′55″N 84°38′11″W
- Country: United States
- State: Michigan
- County: Chippewa

Government
  - Supervisor: Barry Davis

Area
  - Total: 90.0 sq mi (233.2 km^{2})
  - Land: 89.7 sq mi (232.2 km^{2})
  - Water: 0.42 sq mi (1.1 km^{2})
- Elevation: 676 ft (206 m)

Population (2020)
  - Total: 1,289
  - Density: 14.38/sq mi (5.551/km^{2})
- Time zone: UTC-5 (Eastern (EST))
  - Summer (DST): UTC-4 (EDT)
- ZIP code(s): 49780 (Rudyard)
- Area code: 906
- FIPS code: 26-70220
- GNIS feature ID: 1627015
- Website: Official website

Rudyard Township (/ˈrʌd.jərd/ RUDD-yərd) is a civil township of Chippewa County in the U.S. state of Michigan. As of the 2020 census, the township population was 1,289. In 2023, Rudyard Township was designated the "Snowy Owl Capital of Michigan".

== History ==
Rudyard is an unincorporated community within the township located on M-48, near I-75. The community was originally named "Pine River". However, because there was already another town in Michigan with that name, it was changed in 1890 to Rudyard. The name was suggested by Frederick Douglas Underwood, an executive with the Soo Line Railroad, because of his great admiration for Rudyard Kipling.

Rudyard Kipling wrote back to Mr. Underwood, in reference to the naming of the towns of Rudyard and Kipling, Michigan.

== Geography ==
Rudyard Township is in south-central Chippewa County on the Upper Peninsula of Michigan. It is bordered to the south by Mackinac County. Interstate 75 crosses the township, with access to Rudyard village from Exit 373. From the exit, I-75 leads north 22 miles (35 km) to Sault Ste. Marie and south 29 miles (47 km) to St. Ignace on the Straits of Mackinac.

According to the United States Census Bureau, the township has a total area of 90.0 square miles (233.2 km^{2}), of which 89.7 square miles (232.2 km^{2}) is land and 0.42 square miles (1.1 km^{2}), or 0.46%, is water.

=== Climate ===
Climate data for Rudyard 5SE, Michigan, 1991–2020 normals: 667ft (203m)
Month	Jan	Feb	Mar	Apr	May	Jun	Jul	Aug	Sep	Oct	Nov	Dec	Year
Mean daily maximum °F (°C)	23.4 (−4.8)	26.1 (−3.3)	35.2 (1.8)	47.6 (8.7)	62.4 (16.9)	71.7 (22.1)	76.2 (24.6)	75.2 (24.0)	67.6 (19.8)	54.0 (12.2)	40.6 (4.8)	29.7 (−1.3)	50.8 (10.5)
Daily mean °F (°C)	14.3 (−9.8)	15.7 (−9.1)	22.9 (−5.1)	36.5 (2.5)	49.7 (9.8)	58.9 (14.9)	63.4 (17.4)	62.5 (16.9)	55.6 (13.1)	43.8 (6.6)	33.1 (0.6)	21.9 (−5.6)	39.9 (4.4)
Mean daily minimum °F (°C)	5.1 (−14.9)	5.3 (−14.8)	10.5 (−11.9)	25.4 (−3.7)	37.0 (2.8)	46.1 (7.8)	50.6 (10.3)	49.8 (9.9)	43.6 (6.4)	33.5 (0.8)	25.6 (−3.6)	14.0 (−10.0)	28.9 (−1.7)
Average precipitation inches (mm)	2.13 (54)	1.60 (41)	1.88 (48)	2.93 (74)	2.68 (68)	2.94 (75)	3.25 (83)	3.52 (89)	3.73 (95)	4.40 (112)	3.13 (80)	2.38 (60)	34.57 (879)
Average snowfall inches (cm)	20.8 (53)	14.7 (37)	10.3 (26)	7.7 (20)	trace	trace	0.0 (0.0)	0.0 (0.0)	trace	1.0 (2.5)	11.7 (30)	17.8 (45)	84 (213.5)
Source 1: NOAA
Source 2: XMACIS (2012-2020 snowfall)

== Communities ==
- Dryburg was a station on the Minneapolis, St. Paul and Sault Ste. Marie Railroad. It had a post office from 1903 until 1943.

== Demographics ==
As of the census of 2000, there were 1,315 people, 491 households, and 370 families residing in the township. The population density was 14.6 per square mile (5.6/km^{2}). There were 671 housing units at an average density of 7.5 per square mile (2.9/km^{2}). The racial makeup of the township was 88.97% White, 0.30% African American, 5.48% Native American, 0.61% Asian, 0.23% from other races, and 4.41% from two or more races. Hispanic or Latino of any race were 2.13% of the population.

There were 491 households, out of which 39.9% had children under the age of 18 living with them, 60.7% were married couples living together, 8.1% had a female householder with no husband present, and 24.6% were non-families. 22.8% of all households were made up of individuals, and 9.2% had someone living alone who was 65 years of age or older. The average household size was 2.67 and the average family size was 3.08.

In the township the population was spread out, with 30.7% under the age of 18, 5.2% from 18 to 24, 27.8% from 25 to 44, 24.1% from 45 to 64, and 12.2% who were 65 years of age or older. The median age was 37 years. For every 100 females, there were 100.5 males. For every 100 females age 18 and over, there were 92.2 males.

The median income for a household in the township was $37,000, and the median income for a family was $41,875. Males had a median income of $34,375 versus $20,893 for females. The per capita income for the township was $15,941. About 5.7% of families and 8.0% of the population were below the poverty line, including 8.2% of those under age 18 and 15.2% of those age 65 or over.

== Notable people ==
- Bernice Steadman, American aviator and member of the Mercury 13.
- John Petersen, drummer for The Beau Brummels and Harpers Bizarre.
- Gary McDowell, Michigan State Representative.
