= Jean Hixson =

American aviator (1922–1984)

- Born: September 30, 1922; Hoopeston, Illinois, U.S.
- Died: September 21, 1984 (aged 61); Akron, Ohio, U.S.
- Military career
- Branch: United States Air Force Reserve
- Rank: Colonel

Jean Hixson (September 30, 1922 – September 21, 1984) was an American aviator, a Women Airforce Service Pilot and part of the Mercury 13. She was also the second woman to exceed Mach One.

== Early life ==
Jean Hixson was born in Hoopeston, Illinois. Hixson began taking flying lessons at age 16 and was able to get her pilot's license by the age of 18. After Hixson received her license, she began to train with the Women's Air force Service Pilots (WASP). During World War II Hixson flew B-25 Mitchells as an engineering test pilot. After the war, she became a flight instructor in Akron, Ohio. After hours, she attended Akron University and received a degree in Elementary and Secondary Education.

In 1957 Hixson also became the second woman to exceed the speed of sound, in a Lockheed F-94C Starfire flying at over 840 miles per hour (1,350 km/h).

== Mercury 13 ==
The Mercury 13 was a group of women who underwent training in 1959 to train for mission Mercury. Hixson was a member of this group.

== Life after Mercury 13 ==
After testing in the Mercury 13 program, Hixson went to work at the Flight Simulator Techniques branch of the USAF Reserve at Wright-Patterson AFB in Dayton, Ohio.

In 1982, she retired from the Air Force Reserves as a colonel, and that same year chaired a WASP reunion.

In 1983, she completed 30 years of service with the Akron, Ohio school system.

Hixson died of cancer at age 61 on September 21, 1984.

== See also ==
- Mercury 13
