= Jane Briggs Hart =

American aviator

- Born: Jane Cameron Briggs; October 21, 1921; Detroit, Michigan, U.S.
- Died: June 5, 2015 (aged 93); West Hartford, Connecticut, U.S.
- Occupations: Aviator, feminist, anti-war activist
- Spouse: Philip Hart (m. 1943; died 1976)
- Children: 9
- Parent: Walter Briggs Sr.

Jane "Janey" Briggs Hart (née Briggs; October 21, 1921 – June 5, 2015) was an American aviator and in the 1960s, became one of the Mercury 13 women who qualified physically in the same tests as those used for male astronauts. She earned her first pilot's license during World War II and later became the first licensed female helicopter pilot in Michigan.

In the early 1960s, Hart was chosen to participate in the Lovelace Foundation's Woman in Space Program, a privately funded project designed to test women pilots for astronaut fitness by subjecting them to the same physical tests developed by NASA for astronauts. At the age of 40, Hart became one of only 13 women (later dubbed the Mercury 13) to qualify.

In 2007, Hart was inducted into the Michigan Women's Hall of Fame.

== Early life ==
She was born Jane Cameron Briggs, nicknamed "Janey", in Detroit, Michigan, to businessman Walter O. Briggs and his wife Jane (née Cameron). (From 1921 until his death in 1952, Walter Briggs was a partial and then majority owner of the Detroit Tigers.) Raised Catholic, Jane Briggs attended the Academies of the Sacred Heart in Detroit, Grosse Pointe and Torresdale, and the Manhattanville College in New York. In 1970, at age 49, she completed a BA in anthropology from George Washington University in Washington, D.C.

On June 19, 1943, she married attorney Philip Hart, who later became a politician. The couple had nine children together, one of whom died as a toddler. In 1958, Philip Hart was elected as a Democrat to the United States Senate from Michigan; he was repeatedly re-elected, serving until 1976.

== Political career ==
Like her husband, Hart had an abiding interest in politics. She was active in her husband's political campaigns (including piloting him to campaign stops) and served as vice chairman of the Oakland County (Michigan) Democratic Committee. She was a founding member of the National Organization for Women and served as board member and national convention delegate for the Birmingham, Michigan League of Women Voters.

While living in Washington, D.C., Hart gained a reputation as a non-conformist. She was also active in opposition to the Vietnam War, which was sometimes awkward for her senator husband. For example, in the fall of 1969, she was arrested in the major anti-war demonstration at the Pentagon. In 1972, she announced her intention to stop paying federal income taxes, saying, "I cannot contribute one more dollar toward the purchase of more bombs and bullets". Despite this, Senator Hart was unwavering in his support for his wife, although he did not agree with many of her decisions.

== Other activities ==
Hart was also an avid sailor and sailed 15 times in the Port Huron to Mackinac Boat Race as part of an all-women crew.

After her husband's death, Hart donated several boxes of scrapbooks, photographs and newspaper clippings of her life as a senator's wife and aviator to the University of Michigan's Bentley Historical Library.

== Death and legacy ==
Hart died on June 5, 2015, in West Hartford, Connecticut, from complications resulting from Alzheimer's disease, aged 93.

The Jane B. Hart Awards were established at the anthropology department at George Washington University in her honor.

In 2007, she was inducted into the Michigan Women's Hall of Fame.
