= Mercury 13 =

Group of American women who passed astronaut screening tests

Woman in Space Program
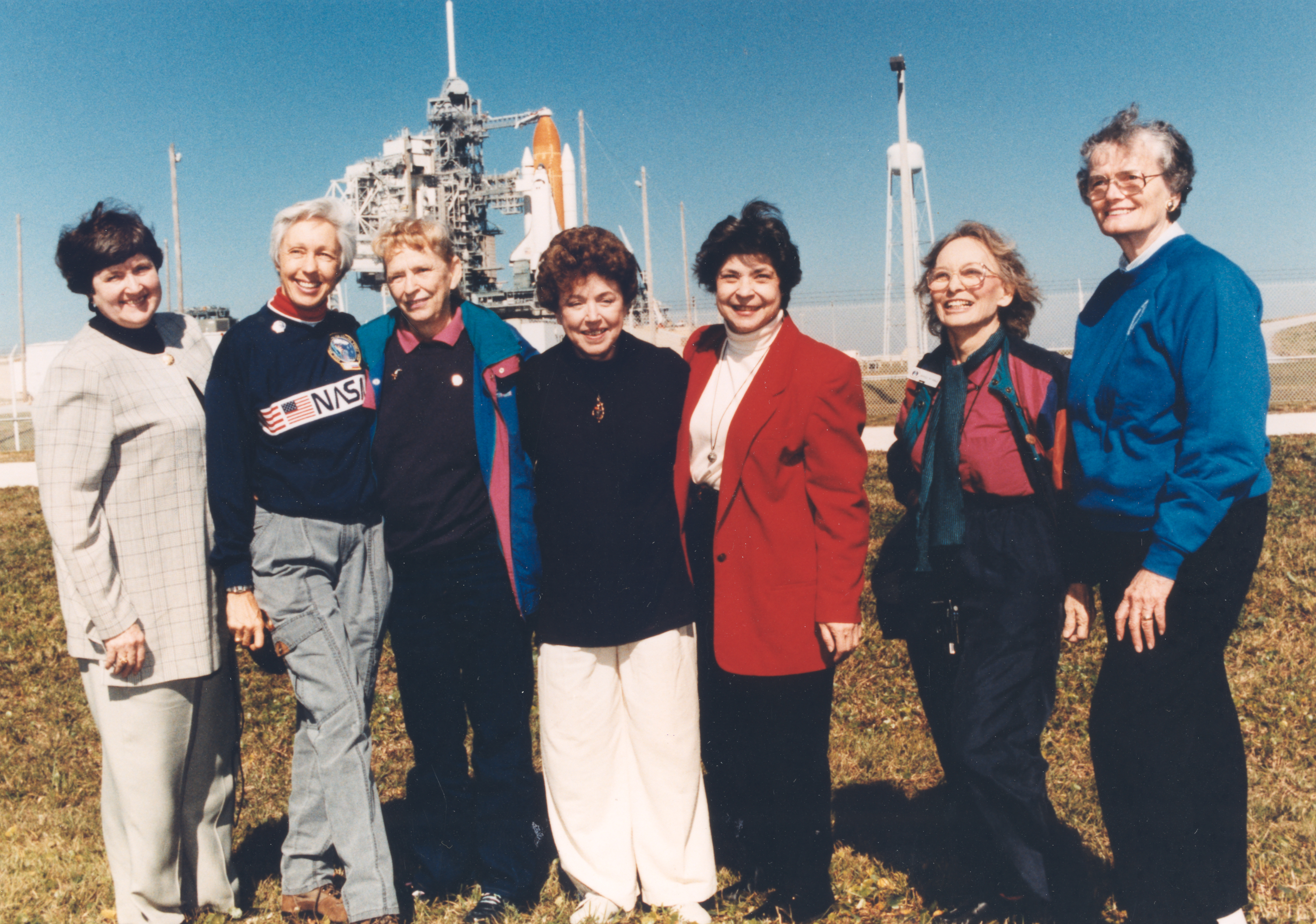
- Seven surviving FLATs attending the STS-63 launch (1995). (From left to right: Gene Nora Jessen, Wally Funk, Jerrie Cobb, Jerri Sloan Truhill, Sarah Ratley, Myrtle Cagle, and Bernice Steadman.)

Program overview
- Country: United States
- Organization: Privately funded program
- Purpose: Medical and physiological astronaut testing
- Status: Discontinued

Program history
- Duration: 1959–1962

The Mercury 13 were thirteen American women who in 1959–60 took part in a privately funded research program run by physician William Randolph Lovelace II, a private contractor to NASA, which aimed to test and screen the women for spaceflight. The first participant, pilot Geraldyn "Jerrie" Cobb helped Lovelace identify and recruit the others. The participants successfully underwent the same physiological screening tests as the astronauts selected by NASA for Project Mercury. While Lovelace called the project the Woman in Space Program, the thirteen women later became known as the "Mercury 13" – a term coined in 1995 as a comparison to the Mercury Seven astronauts.

In the 1960s some of the women were among those who lobbied the White House and Congress to include women in the astronaut program. In 1963, Clare Boothe Luce wrote an article for Life magazine publicizing the women and criticizing NASA for its failure to include women in the astronaut program.

The Mercury 13 were not allowed into the astronaut program, never trained as a group, and did not fly into space until July 20, 2021, when one of the thirteen, Wally Funk, flew aboard the sub-orbital Blue Origin New Shepard 4 Flight 16, at age 82.

The story of these women has been retold in books, exhibits, and movies, including the 2018 Netflix-produced documentary Mercury 13.

== History ==
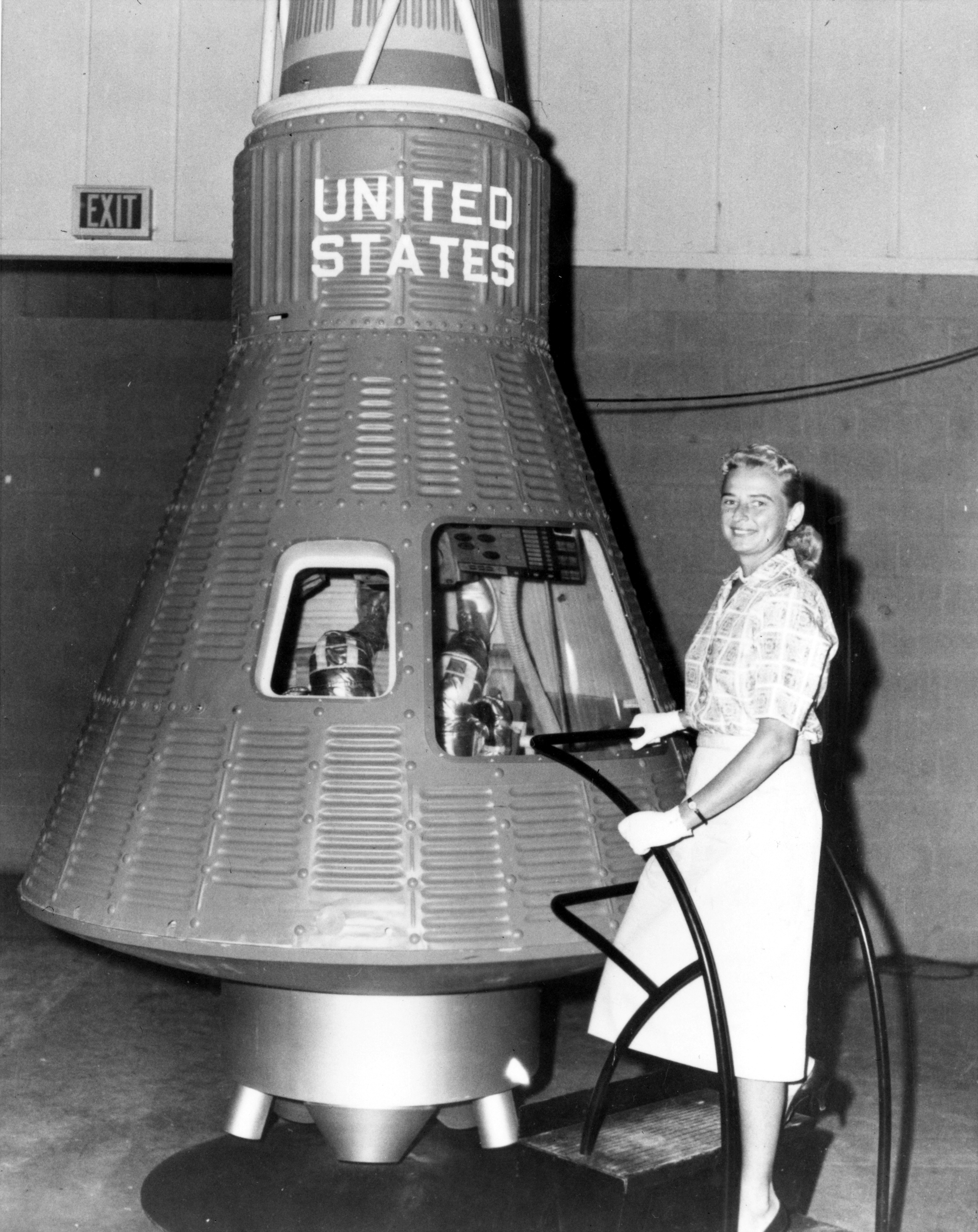
Jerrie Cobb with a Mercury capsule (c. early 1960s)

The Mercury 13 (As Told By U.S. Chief Technology Officer Megan Smith)

When NASA first planned to put people in space, they believed that the best candidates would be pilots, submarine crews or members of expeditions to the Antarctic or Arctic areas. They also thought people with more extreme sports backgrounds, such as parachuting, climbing, deep sea diving, etc. would excel in the program.

NASA knew that numerous people would apply for this opportunity and testing would be expensive. President Dwight Eisenhower believed that military test pilots would make the best astronauts and had already passed rigorous testing and training within the government. This greatly altered the testing requirements and shifted the history of who was chosen to go to space originally.

William Randolph Lovelace II, former Flight Surgeon and later, chairman of the NASA Special Advisory Committee on Life Science, helped develop the tests for NASA's male astronauts and became curious to know how women would do taking the same tests. In 1960, Lovelace and Air Force Brig. General Don Flickinger invited Geraldyn "Jerrie" Cobb, known as an accomplished pilot, to undergo the same rigorous challenges as the men.

Lovelace became interested in beginning this program because he was a medical doctor who had done the NASA physical testing for the official program. He was able to fund the unofficial program, the Woman in Space program, and invited 25 women to come and take the physical tests. Lovelace was interested in the way that women's bodies would react to being in space.

Cobb was the first American woman (and the only one of the Mercury 13) to undergo and pass all three phases of testing. Lovelace announced her success to the public at the second International Symposium on Submarine and Space Medicine in Stockholm, Sweden in August 1960. Cobb's testing was reported publicly via the Associated Press (AP) newswire and articles appeared in the Washington Post and the New York Times as well as Life magazine. These tests were never secret, just little noticed.

Lovelace and Cobb recruited 24 more women to take the tests, financed by the husband of world-renowned aviator Jacqueline Cochran. In addition to Cobb, eighteen women traveled to Albuquerque for the examinations. All total, thirteen women, including Cobb, passed the same tests that had been used to vet the Project Mercury astronaut candidates for NASA. Some were disqualified due to minor brain or heart anomalies.

=== Candidate background ===
All of the candidates were accomplished pilots; Lovelace and Cobb reviewed the records of more than 700 women pilots in order to select candidates. They did not invite anyone with fewer than 1,000 hours of flight experience. Some of the women may have been recruited through the Ninety-Nines, a women pilot's organization of which Cobb was also a member. Some women responded after hearing about the opportunity through friends. This group of women, whom Jerrie Cobb called the First Lady Astronaut Trainees (FLATs), accepted the challenge to be tested for a research program.

Wally Funk wrote an article saying that, given the isolation of the testing, with each woman going through the examination alone or at most in a pair, not all of the women candidates knew each other throughout their years of preparation. It was not until 1994 that ten of the group met in person for the first time.

=== Phase I tests ===
Nineteen women took astronaut fitness examinations given by the Lovelace Clinic in Albuquerque, New Mexico. Unlike NASA's male candidates, who competed in groups, the women did their tests alone or in pairs. Because doctors did not know all the conditions which astronauts might encounter in space, they had to guess what tests might be required. These ranged from typical X-rays and general body physicals to the atypical; for instance, the women had to swallow a rubber tube in order to test the level of their stomach acids. Doctors tested the reflexes in the ulnar nerve of the woman's forearms by using electric shock. To induce vertigo, ice water was shot into their ears, freezing the inner ear so doctors could time how quickly they recovered. The women were pushed to exhaustion while riding specially weighted stationary bicycles, in order to test their respiration. They subjected themselves to many more invasive and uncomfortable tests.

=== The 13 ===
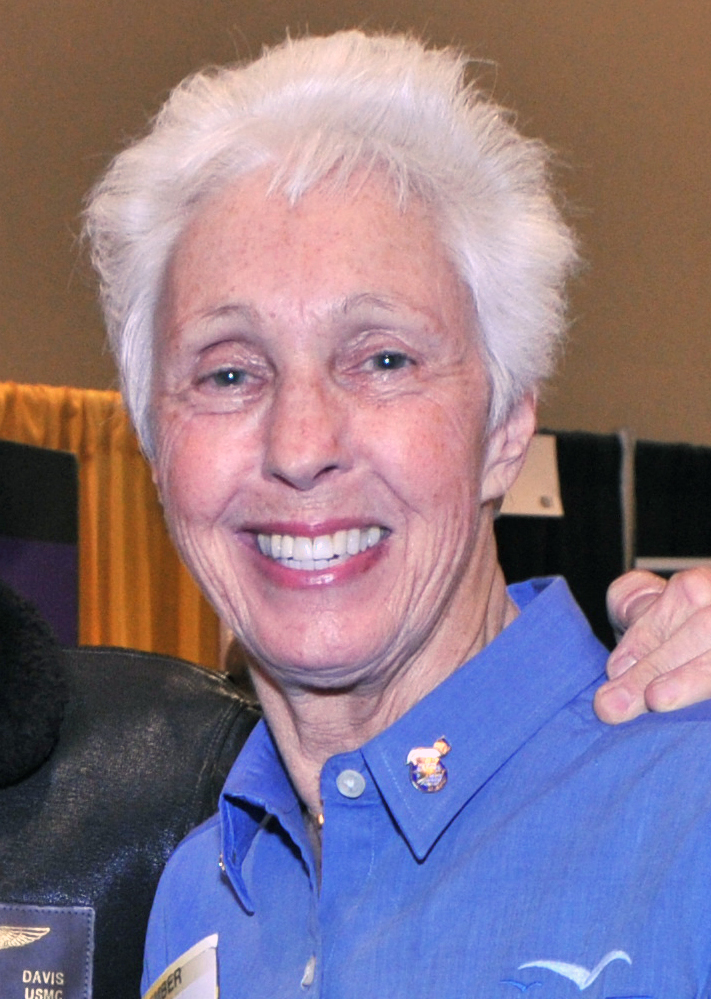
Mercury 13 astronaut Wally Funk flew a suborbital New Shepard spaceflight on July 20, 2021

In the end, thirteen women passed the same Phase I physical examinations that the Lovelace Foundation had developed as part of NASA's astronaut selection process. Those thirteen women were:

- Myrtle Cagle (1925–2019)
- Jerrie Cobb (1931–2019)
- Janet Dietrich (1926–2008)
- Marion Dietrich (1926–1974)
- Wally Funk (1939–2026)
- Sarah Gorelick (later Ratley) (1933–2020)
- Jane "Janey" Briggs Hart (1921–2015)
- Jean Hixson (1922–1984)
- Rhea Woltman (1928–2021)
- Gene Nora Stumbough (later Jessen) (1937–2024)
- Irene Leverton (1927–2017)
- Jerri Sloan (later Truhill) (1929–2013)
- Bernice Steadman (1925–2015)

At 41, Jane Hart was the oldest candidate, and was the mother of eight. Wally Funk was the youngest, at 23. Marion and Janet Dietrich were twin sisters.

=== Additional tests and termination of the program ===
A few women took additional tests. Jerrie Cobb, Rhea Hurrle, and Wally Funk went to Oklahoma City, Oklahoma for Phase II testing, consisting of an isolation tank test and psychological evaluations. Because of other family and job commitments, not all of the women were able to take these tests. Once Cobb had passed the Phase III tests (advanced aeromedical examinations using military equipment and jet aircraft), the group prepared to gather in Pensacola, Florida at the Naval School of Aviation Medicine to follow suit. Two of the women quit their jobs in order to be able to attend. A few days before they were to report, however, the women received telegrams abruptly canceling the Pensacola testing. Without an official NASA request to run the tests, the United States Navy would not allow the use of its facilities for such an unofficial project.

Funk reportedly also completed the third phase of testing, but this claim is misleading. Following NASA's cancellation of the tests, she found ways to continue being tested. She did complete most of the Phase III tests, but only by individual actions, not as part of a specific program. Cobb passed all the training exercises, ranking in the top 2% of all astronaut candidates of both genders.

Regardless of the women's achievements in testing, NASA continued to exclude women as astronaut candidates for years. Despite the Soviet advancement to put the first woman in space in 1963 after Yuri Gagarin's orbit in 1961, the men who testified at the hearing were unmotivated. Any threat to the "patriotic chronology" of the American schedule would be considered an "impediment" or "interruption".

== House Committee Hearing on Gender Discrimination ==
When the Pensacola testing was cancelled, Jerrie Cobb immediately flew to Washington, D.C. to try to have the testing program resumed. She and Janey Hart wrote to President John F. Kennedy and visited Vice President Lyndon B. Johnson. Finally, on 17 and 18 July 1962, Representative Victor Anfuso (D-NY) convened public hearings before a special Subcommittee of the House Committee on Science and Astronautics. Significantly, the hearings investigated the possibility of gender discrimination two years before passage of the Civil Rights Act of 1964 that made such actions illegal.

Cobb and Hart testified about the benefits of Lovelace's private project. Jacqueline Cochran countered their testimony, raising concerns that setting up a special program to train women astronauts could hurt the space program, during the Space Race and the Cold War. She proposed a project with a large group of women, and expected a significant amount to drop out due to reasons like "marriage, childbirth, and other causes". Although Cochran initially supported the testing, she later argued against further phases of testing and training; and, in letters from her to members of the Navy and NASA, she expressed concern over whether the program was to be run properly and in accordance with NASA goals and diverting resources during the Space Race. Some have argued that Cochran did not support NASA training female astronauts at the time out of jealousy, that she would no longer be the most prominent female aviator.

NASA representatives George Low and Astronauts John Glenn and Scott Carpenter testified that under NASA's selection criteria women could not qualify as astronaut candidates. Glenn also believed that "The fact that women are not in this field is a fact of our social order." They correctly stated that NASA required all astronauts to be graduates of military jet test piloting programs and have engineering degrees, although John Glenn conceded that he had been assigned to NASA's Mercury Project without having earned the required college degree. In 1962, women were still barred from Air Force training schools, so no American women could become test pilots of military jets. Despite the fact that several of the women had been employed as civilian test pilots, and many had considerably more propeller aircraft flying time than the male astronaut candidates (although not in high-performance jets, as the men had), NASA refused to consider granting an equivalency for their hours in the more basic propeller aircraft, it was presumed at the time that training and experience in piloting jet and rocket aircraft, such as the X-15 then being developed, would be "most useful for transition to spacecraft." Jan Dietrich had accumulated 8,000 hours, Mary Wallace Funk 3,000 hours, Irene Leverton 9,000+, and Jerrie Cobb 10,000+. Although some members of the Subcommittee were sympathetic to the women's arguments because of this disparity in accepted experience, no action resulted.

Executive Assistant to Vice President Lyndon Johnson, Liz Carpenter, drafted a letter to NASA administrator James E. Webb questioning these requirements, but Johnson did not send the letter, instead writing across it, "Let's stop this now!" Historian Margaret Weitekamp discovered the letter in the late 1990s in the handwriting file of Johnson's vice presidential papers held in Austin, Texas and revealed its existence in her dissertation and book on the Lovelace women.

=== The pilot paradox ===
The qualifications for prospective astronauts had been a point of contention after the creation of NASA in 1958. The proposition for astronauts to have a background as a pilot was a logical choice, specifically test pilots with a disposition to train and learn to fly new craft designs. Pilot certification in the United States rates in 1960 were 244,662 males compared to only 4,218 females, providing a much larger pool to draw from candidate wise. The consensus sought jet test pilots from the military, a field where women were not allowed at the time, and by default excluded from consideration. However, NASA also required potential astronauts to hold college degrees – a qualification that John Glenn of the Mercury 7 group did not possess. Although Glenn had begun studying chemistry at Muskingum College in 1939, when the United States entered World War II he left college before completing his final year to enlist in the U.S. Navy, demonstrating that NASA was sometimes willing to make exceptions to these requirements. The larger issue behind this pretense, recognized by Glenn and the overall fight of the Mercury 13, was the organization of social order. Change was needed for women to be considered, but vehemently resisted in secrecy by those already benefiting from their gender-supported positions. Little to no support ever surfaced for the merit, strength, or intellect women possessed for the role of an astronaut, despite the evidence for the contrary. Some obvious concerns for NASA during the space race included, but were not limited to, oxygen consumption and weight for the drag effect on takeoff. After the undeniable success of their testing, the FLATs were no longer having to prove their physical and psychological fitness. They were pushing the 'social order' to convince NASA that women had a right to hold the same roles men were granted as astronauts. It was not until 1972 that an amendment to Title VII of the Civil Rights Act of 1964 finally granted women legal assistance for entering the realm of space. By 1978, the jet fighter pilot requirement was no longer an obstacle for women candidates. NASA had its first class with women that year. They were admitted into a new category of astronaut, the mission specialist.

== Media attention ==
Lovelace's privately funded women's testing project received renewed media attention when Soviet cosmonaut Valentina Tereshkova became the first woman in space on June 16, 1963. In response, Clare Boothe Luce published an article in Life criticizing NASA and American decision-makers. By including photographs of all thirteen Lovelace finalists, she made the names of all thirteen women public for the first time. On June 17, 1963 New York Times published Jerrie Cobb's comments following the Soviet launch, saying it was "a shame that since we are eventually going to put a woman into space, we didn't go ahead and do it first."

There have been countless newspaper articles, films, and books made about the Mercury 13, but they were never featured on the front page or front runner of any media network. Those opposing the inclusion of women in training as astronauts created an environment where women could be seen to possess either the "virtue of patience" or the "vice of impatience" in terms of U.S. success in the space race.

The media often portrayed the women as unqualified candidates due to what was called their frail and emotional structure, implying that they could not undergo the pressures or stressors that men could. On July 17, 1962, a hearing was set in place for Jerrie Cobb's and Jane Hart's testimony. In further detail, Almost Astronauts: 13 Women Who Dared to Dream, justifies the hearings and statements made by the two as well as the reporters and the press. In their testimony, they inquired about discrimination against women and asked that their talents not be prejudged because they were not men. A scientific writer of The Dallas Times Herald went so far as to plead with Vice President Johnson to allow women to "wear pants and shoot pool, but please do not let them into space."

== First American female astronaut ==
Although both Cobb and Cochran made separate appeals for years afterwards to restart a women's astronaut testing project, the U.S. civil space agency did not select any female astronaut candidates until Astronaut Group 8 in 1978, which selected astronauts for the operational Space Shuttle program. Astronaut Sally Ride became the first American woman in space in 1983 on STS-7, and Eileen Collins was the first woman to pilot the Space Shuttle during STS-63 in 1995. Collins also became the first woman to command a Space Shuttle mission during STS-93 in 1999. In 2005, she commanded NASA's return to flight mission, STS-114. At Collins' invitation, seven of the surviving Lovelace finalists attended her first launch, ten of the FLATs attended her first command mission, and she has flown mementos for almost all of them. BBC News reported that if it wasn't for the rules that further restrained them from flying, then the first woman to go to space could have been an American.

Collins on becoming an astronaut: "When I was very young and first started reading about astronauts, there were no female astronauts." She was inspired while she was a child by the Mercury astronauts and by the time she was in high school and college, more opportunities were opening up for women who wanted a part in aviation. Collins then tried out the Air Force and during her very first month's training exercises her base was visited by the newest astronaut class. This class was the first to include women. From that point, she knew that "I wanted to be part of our nation's space program. It's the greatest adventure on this planet – or off the planet, for that matter. I wanted to fly the Space Shuttle."

=== Other notable influences ===
The first woman in space, Russian cosmonaut Valentina Tereshkova, was arguably less qualified than the FLATs having no qualifications as a pilot or scientist. Upon meeting Jerrie Cobb, Tereshkova told Cobb that Cobb was Tereshkova's role model and asked "we always figured you would be first. What happened?"

== Honors and awards ==
- In May 2007, the eight surviving members of the group were awarded honorary doctorates by the University of Wisconsin–Oshkosh.
- The Mercury 13 were awarded the Adler Planetarium Women in Space Science Award in 2005.
- Jerrie Cobb was acknowledged in Clare Boothe Luce's Life article, highlighting her various flying awards and achieving four major world records.
  - In 1959, she established the world record for long-distance nonstop flight and the record of the world light-plane speed.
  - In 1960, she was given the acknowledgement for the altitude record of a lightweight aircraft flown at about 37,010 feet.
- On July 1, 2021, Blue Origin announced that Wally Funk would fly to space on the first crewed flight of New Shepard. Funk, 82, flew the suborbital flight on July 20, 2021, and became the oldest person to fly to space.

== In popular culture ==
- The #1 issue of the Marvel comic Captain Marvel (2012) features a fictionalized Mercury 13 participant named Helen Cobb as one of Carol Danvers's heroes.
- An episode of the 2015 ABC series The Astronaut Wives Club features a fictional account of the FLATs.
- The 2007 documentary She Should Have Gone to the Moon, directed by Ulrike Kubbatta, explores the life of Geraldine Hamilton Sloan Truhill, one of the 13.
- In 2018, the documentary Mercury 13, directed by David Sington for Netflix, was released.
- In the 2019 Apple TV+ miniseries For All Mankind, two fictional members of the Mercury 13 are chosen as female astronaut candidates after the Soviets land the first woman on the Moon.

== Literature about or referencing the group ==
- Amelia Earhart's Daughters: the Wild and Glorious Story of American Women Aviators from World War II to the Dawn of the Space Age, by Leslie Haynsworth and David Toomey
- Right Stuff, Wrong Sex: America's First Women in Space Program by Margaret A. Weitekamp
- The Mercury 13: The True Story of Thirteen Women and the Dream of Space Flight by Martha Ackmann
- Almost Astronauts: 13 Women Who Dared to Dream by Tanya Lee Stone
- Promised the Moon: The Untold Story of the First Women in the Space Race by Stephanie Nolan
- Wally Funk's Race for Space: The Extraordinary Story of a Female Aviation Pioneer by Sue Nelson
- Women in Space: 23 Stories of First Flights, Scientific Missions, and Gravity-Breaking Adventures (Women of Action) by Karen Bush Gibson
- Fighting for Space: Two Pilots and Their Historic Battle for Female Spaceflight by Amy Shira Teitel, 2020

== Past and current parallels ==
=== "Before their time" ===
Reflecting on the events of 1962 and the outcome of the Mercury 13, astronaut Scott Carpenter said, "NASA never had any intention of putting those women in space. The whole idea was foisted upon it, and it was happy to have the research data, but those women were before their time." Despite the importance of the physiological data collected during the 1960–61 testing of the women, it was subsequently lost, so the research had to be repeated in the 1970s.

Reflecting on the exclusion of women from training as jet fighter pilots, The United States Air Force explicitly would not test women for high-altitude flight for lack of pressure suits in the correct sizes. Their response to the initial testing of female astronauts was that women could not become astronauts "because they had nothing to wear."

In March 2019, NASA announced that there would be the first all-female spacewalk on the 29th of that month performed at the International Space Station. Anne McClain and Christina Koch were supposed to make history that day, but complications arose when there was a lack of spacesuit availability. NASA has had issues when it comes to spacesuit sizes claiming that they only come in medium, large and extra-large sizes. In the 1990s, NASA stopped making spacesuit sizes in small due to technical glitches, which had a huge impact on women astronauts. The long-delayed first all-female spacewalk finally occurred on October 18, 2019, with Koch and Jessica Meir performing the task, and astronaut Stephanie Wilson acting as Capcom.

== See also ==
- Valentina Tereshkova, first woman in space
- Svetlana Savitskaya, second woman in space and the first to do a spacewalk
- Sally Ride, first American woman in space
- Kathryn D. Sullivan, first American woman to perform a spacewalk
- Women in NASA
