= Jerrie Cobb =

American aviator and astronaut (1931–2019)

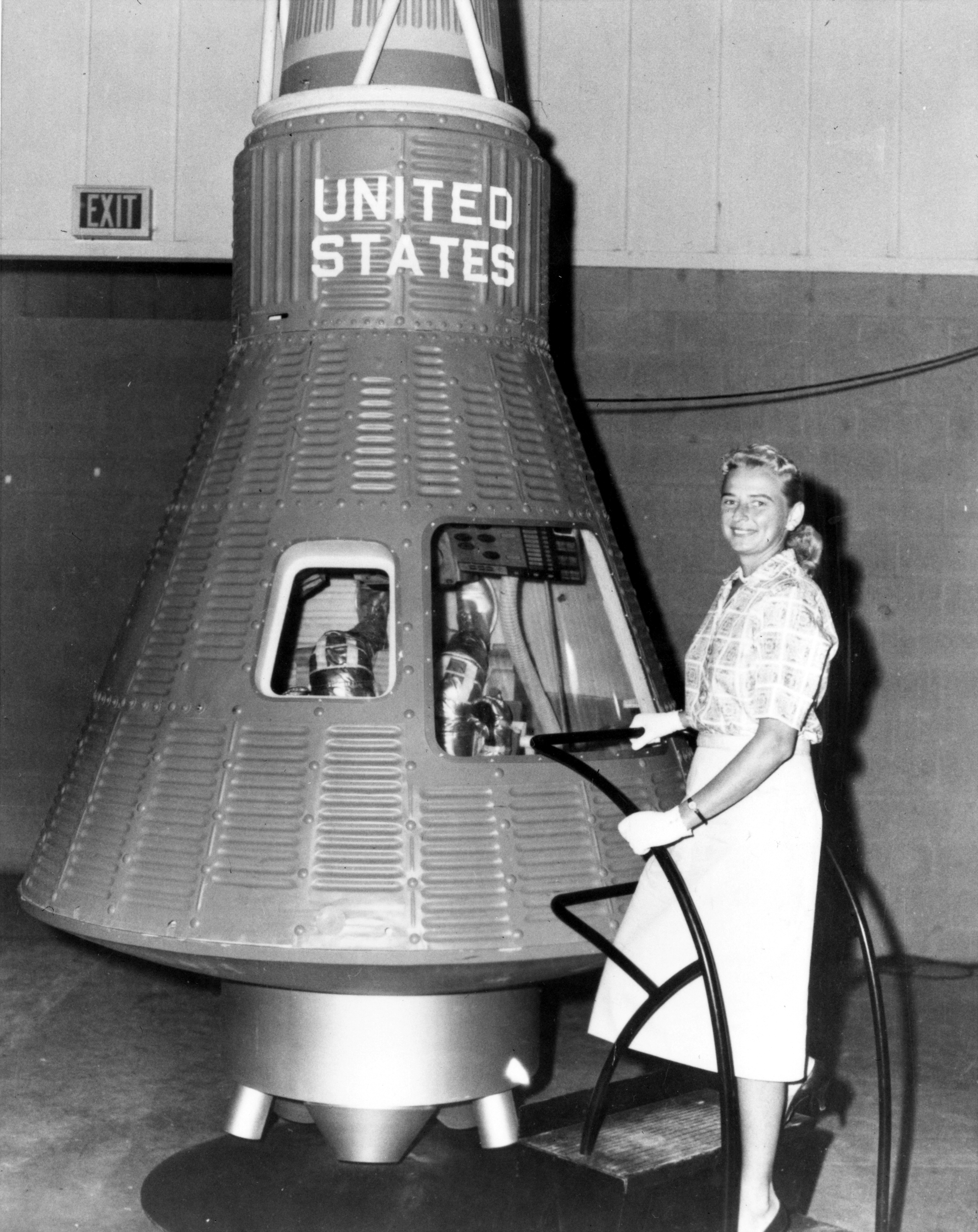
- Jerrie Cobb with a Project Mercury spacecraft
- Born: Geraldyn Meron Cobb; March 5, 1931; Norman, Oklahoma, US
- Died: March 18, 2019 (aged 88); Florida, US
- Education: Oklahoma City Classen High School
- Known for: Part of the Mercury 13
- Aviation career
- First flight: 1943

Geraldyn Meron "Jerrie" Cobb (March 5, 1931 – March 18, 2019) was an American pilot and aviator. She was part of the Mercury 13, a group of women who underwent physiological screening tests at the same time as the original Mercury Seven astronauts, and was the first to complete each of the tests.

Cobb set three aviation records in her 20s: the 1959 world record for non-stop long-distance flight, the 1959 world light-plane speed record, and a 1960 world altitude record for lightweight aircraft of 37,010 feet (11,280 m). In 1960, Life Magazine named her as one of nine women of the "100 most important young people in the United States".

== Early life ==
Born on March 5, 1931, in Norman, Oklahoma, Cobb was the daughter of Lt. Col. William H. Cobb and Helena Butler Stone Cobb. From birth, Cobb was on the move, as is common for many children of military families. Weeks after she was born, Cobb's family moved to Washington, D.C., where her grandfather, Ulysses Stevens Stone, was serving in the United States House of Representatives. After Ulysses Stone lost a re-election bid, the family moved back to Oklahoma, where he and Cobb's father worked as automobile salesmen. Once the United States became involved in World War II, Cobb's family moved once again, this time to Wichita Falls, Texas, where Cobb's father joined his active U.S. National Guard unit. The family later moved again to Denver, Colorado, before finally returning to Oklahoma after World War II, where Cobb spent the majority of her childhood in Ponca City.

As a child growing up in Oklahoma, Cobb took to aviation at an early age, with her pilot father's encouragement. She first flew at age twelve, in her father's open cockpit 1936 Waco biplane. At 16, she was barnstorming around the Great Plains in a Piper J-3 Cub, dropping leaflets over little towns announcing the arrival of circuses. Sleeping under the Cub's wing at night, she helped scrape together money for fuel to practice her flying by giving rides. By the age of 17, while a student at Oklahoma City Classen High School, Cobb had earned her private pilot's license. She received her commercial pilot's license a year later, on her 18th birthday. In 1948, Cobb attended Oklahoma College for Women for a year.

== Career ==
Facing sex discrimination and the return of many qualified male pilots after World War II, Cobb took on less-sought-after flying jobs, such as patrolling pipelines and crop dusting. She went on to earn her multi-engine, instrument, flight instructor, and ground instructor ratings, as well as her airline transport license. At the age of 21, she was delivering military fighters and four-engined bombers to foreign air forces worldwide.

When Cobb became the first woman to fly in the 1959 Paris Air Show, the world's largest air exposition, her fellow pilots named her Pilot of the Year and awarded her the Amelia Earhart Gold Medal of Achievement.

Cobb played women's softball for money on a semi-professional team, the Oklahoma City Queens, to save up to buy a surplus World War II Fairchild PT-23 so that she could be self-employed.

By 1959, at age 28, Cobb was a pilot and manager for Aero Design and Engineering Company, which also made the Aero Commander aircraft that she used in her record-making feats. She was one of the few female executives in aviation. By 1960, she had accrued 7,000 hours of flying time.

In November 1960, following a number of crashes of the Lockheed L-188 Electra, American Airlines' marketing department identified that the aircraft's reputation was poor among women, which was adversely affecting passenger bookings. American Airlines had no female pilots so, in an attempt to win over passengers, the airline invited Cobb to fly the aircraft on a highly publicized four-hour test, her first turboprop flight.

In May 1961 NASA Administrator James Webb appointed Cobb as a consultant to the NASA space program.

== Medical testing ==
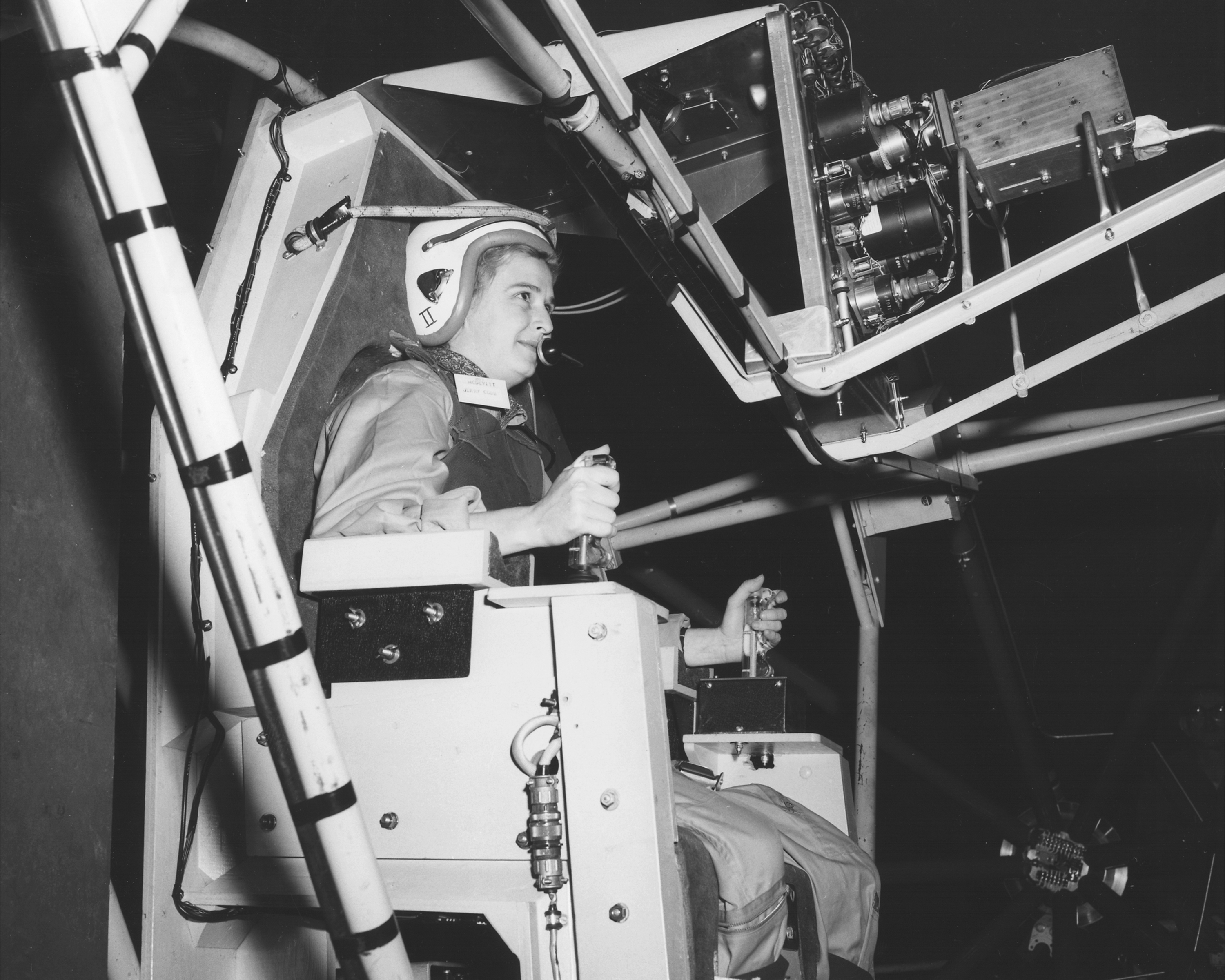
Jerrie Cobb operating the Multi-Axis Space Test Inertia Facility (MASTIF) at the Lewis Research Center in Ohio. The test simulated bringing a spinning spacecraft under control, and was one of many that the women of the Mercury 13 went through in order to qualify for space flight.

Although Cobb successfully completed all three stages of physical and psychological evaluation that were used in choosing the first seven Mercury astronauts, it was not an official NASA program, and she was unable to rally support in Congress for adding women to the astronaut program. At the time, Cobb had flown 64 types of propeller aircraft, but had made only one flight in a jet fighter, in the back seat. As a NASA historian wrote:

Although she never flew in space, Cobb, along with twenty-four other women, underwent physical tests similar to those taken by the Mercury astronauts with the belief that she might become an astronaut trainee. All the women who participated in the program, known as First Lady Astronaut Trainees, were skilled pilots. Dr. Randy Lovelace, a NASA scientist who had conducted the official Mercury program physicals, administered the tests at his private clinic without official NASA sanction. Cobb passed all the training exercises, ranking in the top 2% of all astronaut candidates of both genders.

In 1962, Cobb was called to testify before a Congressional hearing, the Special Subcommittee on the Selection of Astronauts, about female astronauts. Astronaut John Glenn stated at the hearing that "men go off and fight the wars and fly the airplanes", and "the fact that women are not in this field is a fact of our social order". Only a few months later, the Soviet Union sent the first woman into space, Valentina Tereshkova. Soon afterward, Tereshkova sympathized with Cobb: "They (American leaders) shout at every turn about their democracy and at the same time they announce they will not let a woman into space. This is open inequality."

Along with other Mercury 13 participants, including Jane Briggs Hart, Cobb lobbied to be allowed to train alongside the men. At the time, however, NASA requirements for entry into the astronaut program were that the applicant be a military test pilot, experienced at high-speed military test flying, and have an engineering background, enabling them to take over controls in the event it became necessary. Since all military test pilots were men at the time, that effectively excluded women. Liz Carpenter, the executive assistant to Vice President Lyndon B. Johnson, drafted a letter to NASA administrator, James E. Webb, questioning those requirements, but Johnson did not send the letter, instead writing across it: "Let's stop this now!"

== Later life and death ==
Cobb then began over 30 years of missionary work in South America with MAF, performing humanitarian flying (e.g., transporting supplies to indigenous tribes), as well as surveying new air routes to remote areas. Cobb "pioneered new air routes across the hazardous Andes Mountains and Amazon rain forests, using self-drawn maps that guided her over uncharted territory larger than the United States". She has been honored by the Brazilian, Colombian, Ecuadorian, French, and Peruvian governments. In 1981, she was nominated for the Nobel Peace Prize for her humanitarian work.

In 1999, the National Organization for Women conducted an unsuccessful campaign to send Cobb into space to investigate the effects of aging, as John Glenn had done. Glenn's main purpose was to observe the effects of a micro-gravity environment on the body of an aged individual. Specifically, NASA wanted to see whether the effects of weightlessness had positive consequences on the balance, metabolism, blood flow, and other bodily functions of an elderly person. Cobb believed that it was necessary to send an aged woman on a space flight as well, to determine whether the same effects witnessed in men would be witnessed in women. At 67, Cobb, who had passed the same tests as John Glenn, petitioned NASA for the chance to participate in such a space flight, but NASA stated "it had no plans to involve additional senior citizens in upcoming launches". Many aviators and astronauts of the time believed that was a failed chance for NASA to right a wrong they had committed years before, but Cobb never reached her ultimate goal of space flight.

Cobb received numerous aviation honors, including the Harmon Trophy and the Fédération Aéronautique Internationale's Gold Wings Award.

On March 18, 2019, thirteen days after her 88th birthday, Cobb died at her home in Florida.

== In popular culture ==
Laurel Ollstein's 2017 play, They Promised Her the Moon, (revised in 2019) tells the story of Jerrie Cobb and her struggle to become an astronaut.

Sonya Walger portrays the character Molly Cobb, based on Jerrie Cobb, in the 2019 alternate history TV series For All Mankind, in which Cobb becomes the first American woman in space. Episode four of the first season, "Prime Crew", is dedicated to her memory.

Cobb is portrayed by Mamie Gummer in the 2020 Disney+ series The Right Stuff.

== Awards ==
- Amelia Earhart Gold Medal of Achievement
- Named Woman of the Year in Aviation
- Named Pilot of the Year by the National Pilots Association
- Fourth American to be awarded Gold Wings of the Fédération Aéronautique Internationale, Paris, France, Europe
- Honored by the government of Ecuador for pioneering new air routes over the Andes Mountains and Andes jungle
- 1962: received the Golden Plate Award of the American Academy of Achievement
- 1973: awarded Harmon International Trophy for "The Worlds Best Woman Pilot" by President Richard Nixon at a White House ceremony.
- Inducted into the Oklahoma Hall of Fame as "the Most Outstanding Aviatrix in the US
- Received Pioneer Woman Award for her "courageous frontier spirit" flying all over the Amazon jungle serving primitive Indian tribes
- 1979: Bishop Wright Air Industry Award for her "humanitarian contributions to modern aviation".
- 2000: inducted into "Women in Aviation International Pioneer Hall of Fame".
- 2007: Honorary Doctor of Science degree from University of Wisconsin–Oshkosh.
- 2012: inducted into the National Aviation Hall of Fame.
