= Powder Puff Derby (1947) =

Annual transcontinental air race for women pilots (1947–1977)

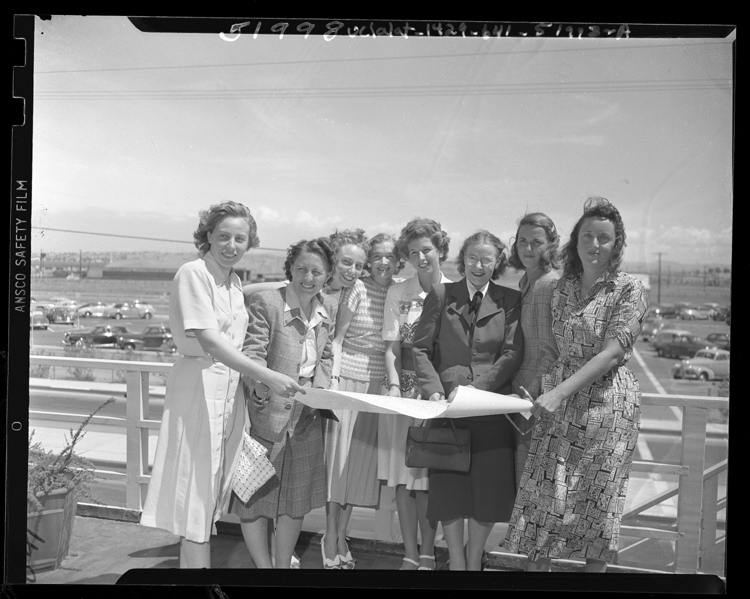
Eight women pilots before they left Palm Springs for 1948 Powder Puff Derby

The Powder Puff Derby was the name given to an annual transcontinental air race for women pilots inaugurated in 1947. For the next two years it was named the "Jacqueline Cochran All-Woman Transcontinental Air Race" (AWTAR). It was dubbed the "Powder Puff Derby" in reference to the 1929 Women's Air Derby by humorist and aviation advocate Will Rogers.

In 1977, rising costs, insurance premiums, and diminished corporate sponsorship saw the competition come to an end after thirty years. After the commemorative final flight, the Air Race Classic continued the tradition for women pilots.

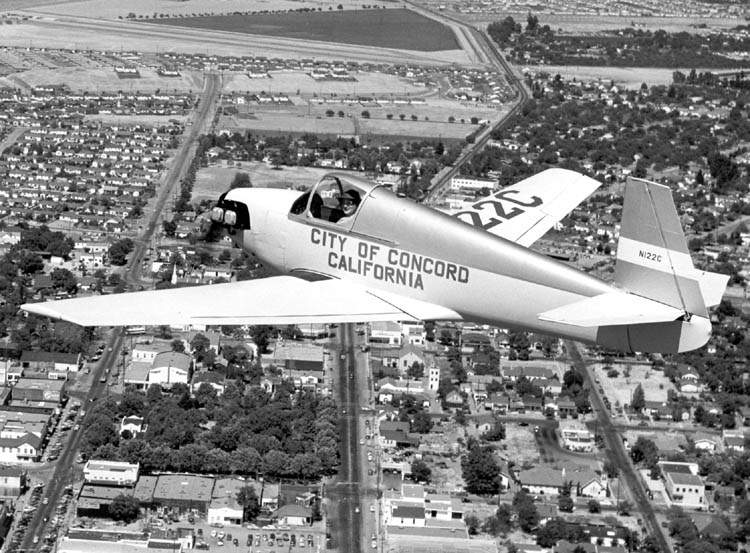
Gladys Davis flying her Mooney M-18 Mite over downtown Concord, California, in June 1950. She came in fifth in the Powder Puff Derby flying from California to South Carolina.

== Popular culture ==
The Powder Puff Derby was frequently mentioned in the television series The Astronaut Wives Club (2015). Trudy Olson Cooper (1927-1994), the wife of astronaut Gordon Cooper, was a pilot who is depicted as longing to fly in such a race. In 1970, Trudy Cooper did fly the first leg of the race.

The event was the subject of a Peanuts storyline in the summer of 1975 involving Peppermint Patty and Marcie leasing Snoopy's "Sopwith Camel" (his doghouse) and entering the race. This coincided with Charles M. Schulz's second wife Jean Forsyth Clyde and her mother actually participating in the Derby.

== See also ==
- Powderpuff (sports)
