= William Randolph Lovelace II =

American physician

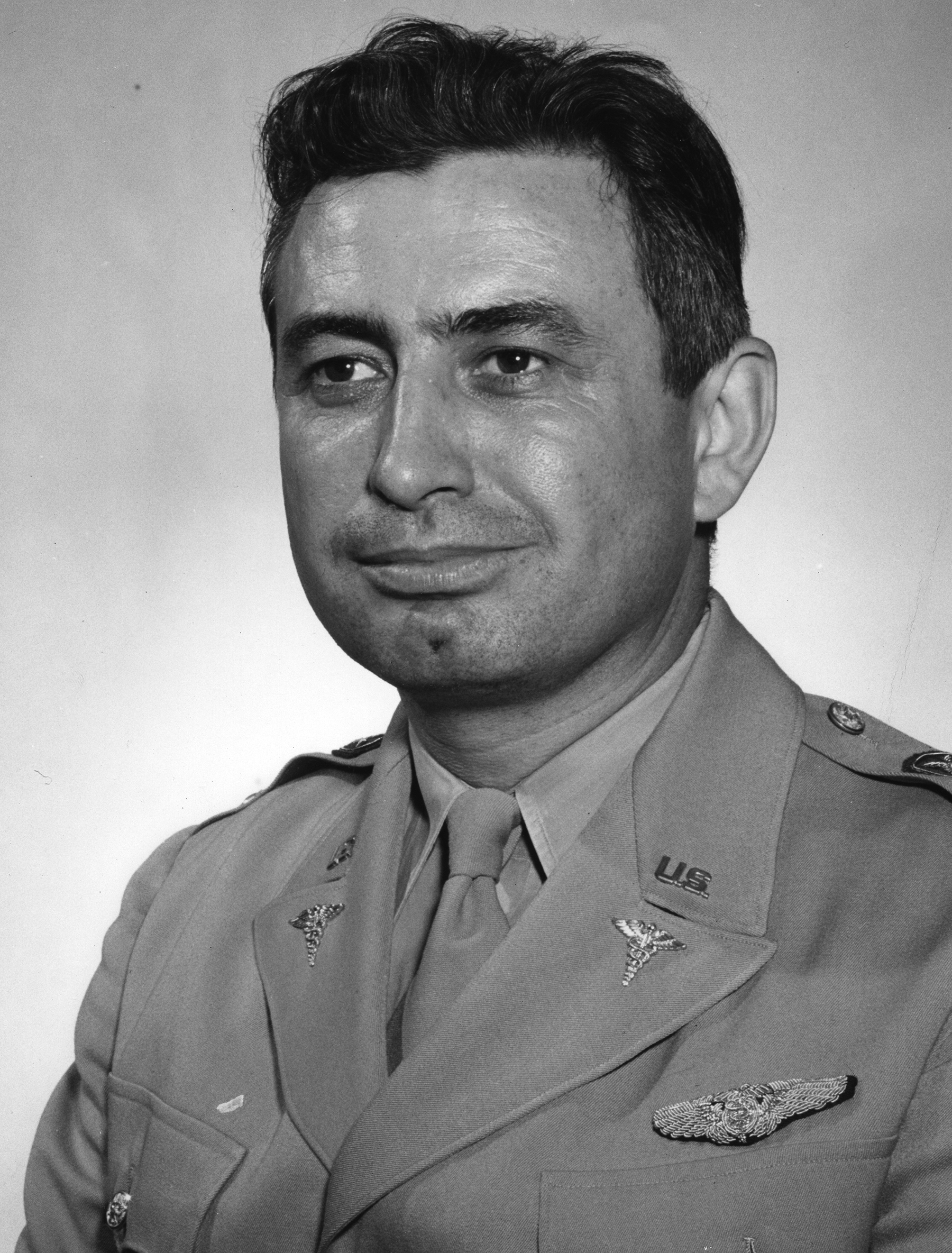
- Dr. Lovelace in 1943
- Born: 30 December 1907; Springfield, Missouri, U.S.
- Died: 12 December 1965 (aged 57); Aspen, Colorado, U.S.
- Burial place: Fairview Memorial Park; Albuquerque, New Mexico, U.S.
- Alma mater: Harvard University
- Military career
- Allegiance: United States
- Branch: United States Army Medical Corps; United States Air Force Reserves
- Service years: 1940–1965
- Rank: Brigadier General
- Awards: Distinguished Flying Cross

William Randolph Lovelace II (December 30, 1907 – December 12, 1965) was an American physician who made contributions to aerospace medicine.

== Biography ==
He studied medicine at the Harvard Medical School and graduated in 1934. His residences were served at New York's Bellevue Hospital and the Mayo Clinic in Rochester, Minnesota. He then went to Europe for further study.

Having an interest in aviation, he became Flight Surgeon with the rank of First Lieutenant in Army Medical Corps Reserve. He began studying the problems of high-altitude flight, and in 1938 the Aeromedical Field Laboratory located at Wright Field requested him to develop an oxygen-mask for use in high-altitude aircraft.

It was in 1940 that he first met Jacqueline Cochran, a female pilot who held three women's speed records. The two would form a lifelong friendship. With Cochran's influence, Lovelace developed a research program focusing on women's capabilities for spaceflight. Lovelace believed women could be highly suitable for space because they were smaller and lighter for small space vehicles. Lovelace used his privately owned clinic to invite twenty-five women to take the testing regimen developed for NASA's Project Mercury astronauts. The women who were chosen all had to fulfill Lovelace's requirements: be under the age of 35, in good health, hold a second class medical certificate, have a bachelor's degree, hold an FAA commercial pilot rating or better, and have over 2,000 hours of flying time. Prior to beginning testing, Lovelace's women had to undergo thorough examinations which included numerous x-rays and four hour eye exams. The women's bodies were physically tested by using special stationary bikes to test their respiration and ice water was shot into their ears to induce vertigo to see how quickly the women could recover. Nineteen women traveled to Albuquerque for the examinations. Jerrie Cobb successfully completed all of the same medical testing as the Mercury Seven men. Twelve more of Lovelace's women were chosen, but their testing ended suddenly due to the United States Navy no longer granting access to the final testing facility in Pensacola.

During World War II, Lovelace served in the United States Army Air Forces. He personally performed experiments in escape and the use of the parachute at high-altitude. On 24 June 1943 he bailed out of an aircraft flying at 40,200 feet (12,300 m). After the parachute opened he was knocked unconscious, and he suffered frostbite when one of his gloves was ripped off. For this test he was awarded the Distinguished Flying Cross.

His wife Mary had two sons, but both died of poliomyelitis in 1946. The couple also had three daughters. In 1947 they moved to Albuquerque, New Mexico, and he joined his uncle at Lovelace Clinic, with whom he established the Lovelace Medical Foundation, currently known as the Lovelace Respiratory Research Institute, in Albuquerque. He became the chairman of the Board of Governors. His first hire was Clayton Samuel White for director of research. Lovelace used this clinic to promote the development of medical aerospace technology.

== Work for the U.S. government ==
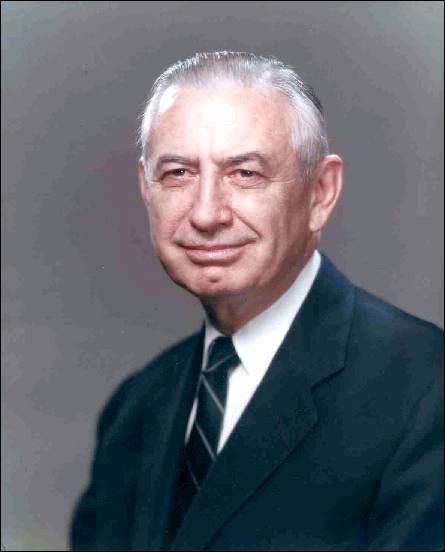
Dr. Lovelace circa 1960

From 1951 to 1952, Lovelace served as chair of the Armed Forces Medical Policy Council.

In 1951, Lovelace's clinic was awarded a contract by the United States Atomic Energy Commission to conduct field and laboratory experiments on the injuries caused by nuclear detonation on more than a dozen different kinds of animals. The clinic monitored how fast various species of animals died and the number of scars on the lungs of the various animals caused by nuclear shock waves.

Lovelace's clinic tested pilots assigned to fly the Lockheed U-2 spy plane of the U.S. Central Intelligence Agency. Experiments on the effects of high-altitude flight on the pilots were conducted by former Operation Paperclip recruit Ulrich Cameron Luft, who had conducted tests for the Nazi Luftwaffe on the physiological effects of high-altitude activities before and during World War II.

In 1958 he was appointed the chairman of the NASA Special Advisory Committee on Life Sciences. As head of NASA's Life Sciences, he would then play a key role in the selection of the astronauts chosen for Project Mercury. In 1959 he also began examinations to determine the physical suitability of women candidates for the astronaut training program. In 1964 he was appointed NASA’s Director of Space Medicine.

== Death ==
On December 12, 1965, Lovelace and his wife Mary were being flown in a private plane near Aspen, Colorado when the plane crashed into a canyon. Dr. and Mrs. Lovelace, along with their pilot, Milton Brown (27), died at the crash site. Their bodies were found by a search party days later after their efforts were delayed due to a severe snow storm. The pilot had arranged Dr. and Mary Lovelace next to each other and covered them with a coat before he died of his injuries and exposure.
