= Lovelace Health System =

Healthcare organization in Albuquerque, United States

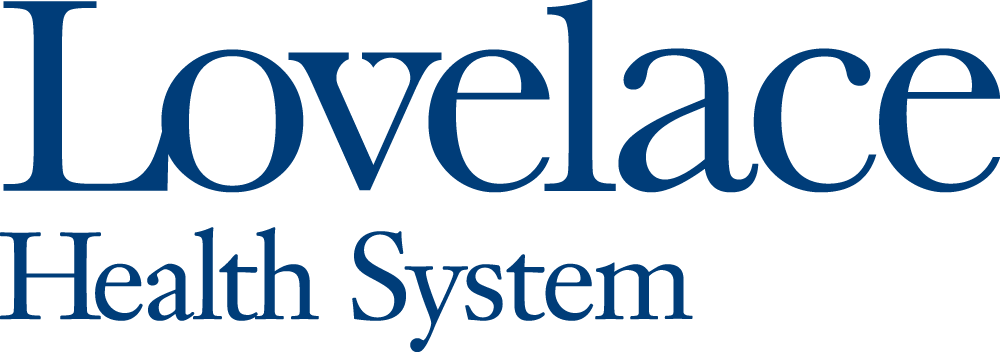

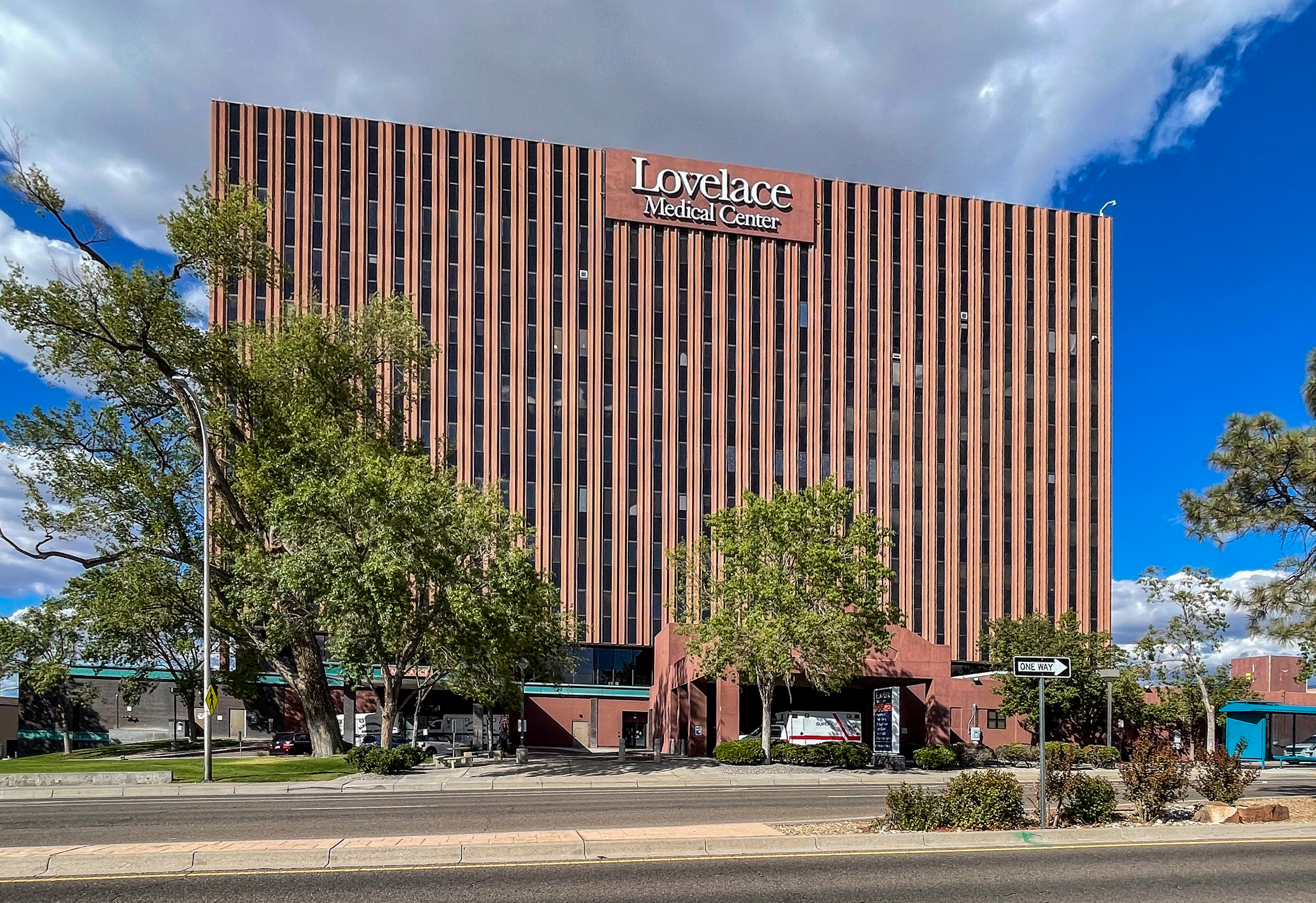
- Lovelace Medical Center, the company's flagship hospital
- Industry: Healthcare
- Founded: 1922
- Founder: William Randolph Lovelace; Edgar T. Lassetter
- Headquarters: Albuquerque, New Mexico
- Owner: Ardent Health Services
- Number of employees: 3,659 (2020)
- Website: https://lovelace.com/

Lovelace Health System is a healthcare company which operates six hospitals in New Mexico, five in Albuquerque and one in Roswell. It is one of New Mexico's largest employers with 3,659 employees as of 2020. The company grew out of the Lovelace Clinic founded in 1922, one of the pioneers of group medical practice in the United States. The clinic was best known for conducting physical evaluations of 32 astronaut candidates in 1959 which helped to select the Mercury Seven, the first Americans to travel into space. The clinic also administered testing for an unofficial "women in space" program, during which 13 women—later nicknamed the Mercury 13—were named as prospective astronauts, though they never traveled to space.

From 1947 to 1985, the company was a nonprofit institution owned and operated by the Lovelace Foundation for Medical Education and Research (now a separate entity, Lovelace Respiratory Research Institute). Lovelace was subsequently reorganized as a for-profit hospital network and has been under the ownership of Ardent Health Services since 2002.

== History ==
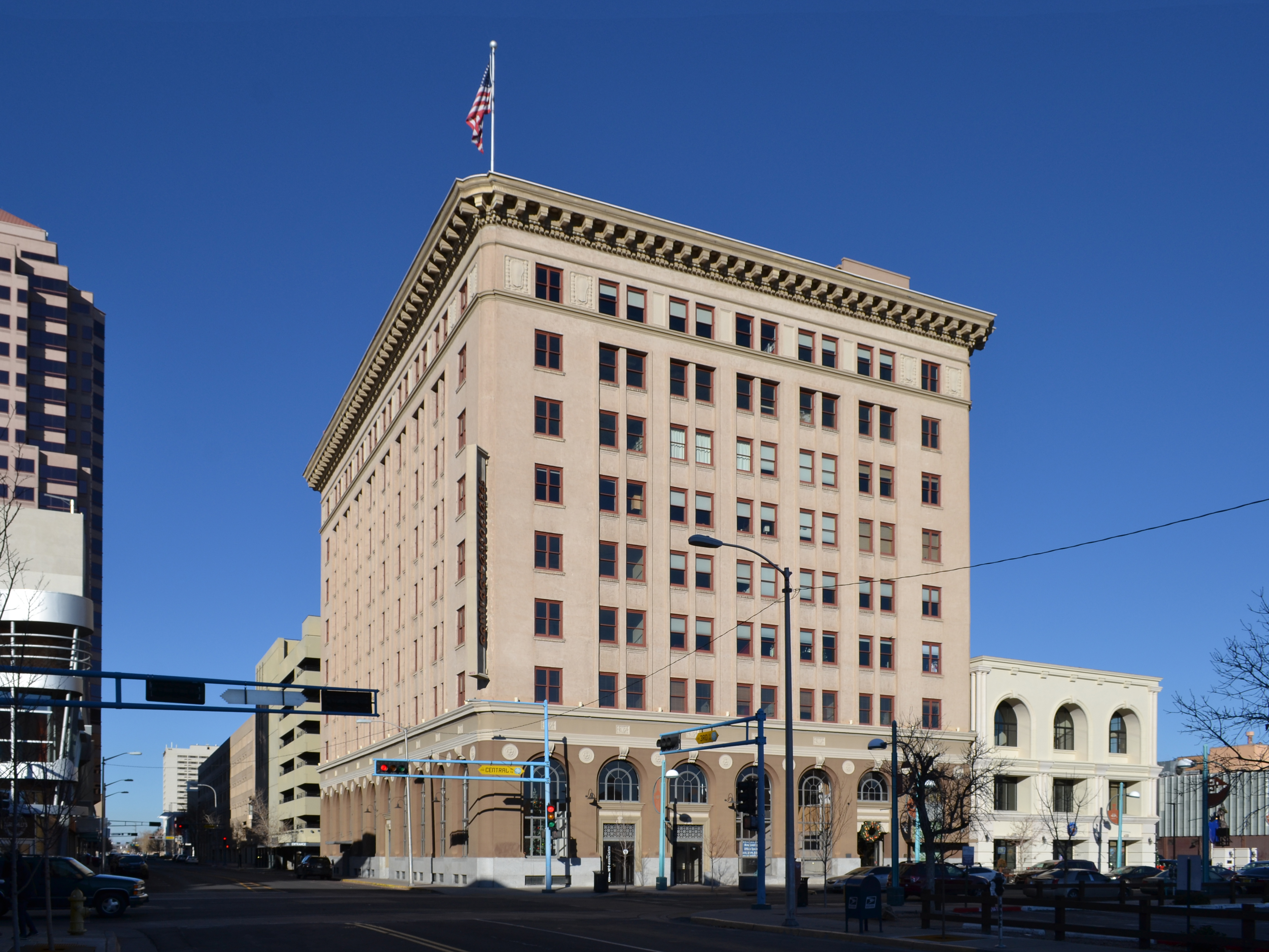
The First National Bank Building housed the clinic from 1923 to 1950.

The clinic was established in 1922 by William Randolph Lovelace (1883–1968) and his brother-in-law Edgar T. Lassetter (1875–1948), both of whom had originally moved to New Mexico to recover from tuberculosis. In 1946, William Randolph Lovelace II, a nephew of both Lovelace and Lassetter, joined the practice. He had previously worked at the Mayo Clinic and had connections in the aviation industry, which helped turn the Lovelace Clinic into a leader in aerospace medicine. Lovelace II quickly took on a leadership role at the clinic and was instrumental in its 1947 reorganization as a nonprofit under the control of the Lovelace Foundation for Medical Education and Research. Another notable physician, Clayton Sam White, was hired as the foundation's first director of research.

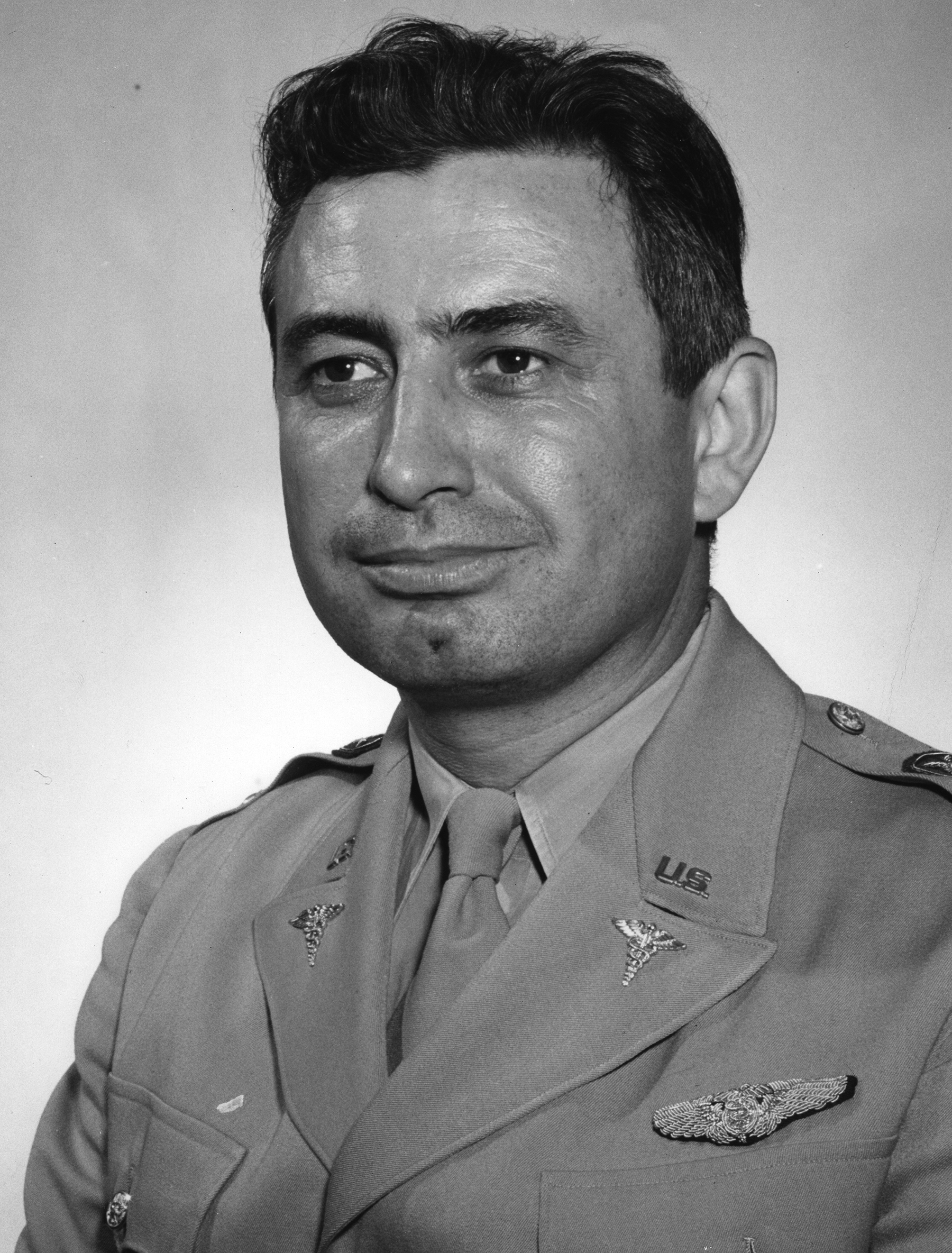
William Randolph Lovelace II, 1943

In 1950, the clinic moved from its original location on the third floor of the First National Bank Building to a new purpose-built facility at Gibson and Ridgecrest in the Southeast Heights designed by office of John Gaw Meem. By the 1950s, the Lovelace Clinic was considered one of the "Big Six" group practice clinics in the United States along with the Mayo Clinic, Lahey Clinic, Cleveland Clinic, Ochsner Clinic, and Henry Ford Hospital. The medical staff grew from 22 physicians in 1947 to 75 in 1965 and 151 in 1986. In 1959, the clinic conducted physical evaluations of 32 astronaut candidates which helped to select the Mercury Seven, the first Americans to travel into space. At Lovelace II's suggestion, the clinic also administered testing for an unofficial "women in space" program, during which 13 women—later nicknamed the Mercury 13—were named as prospective astronauts, though they never traveled to space.

In 1972, the Lovelace Clinic partnered with the neighboring Bataan Memorial Hospital to launch one of the first two health maintenance organizations (HMOs) in New Mexico, and in 1973 the clinic and hospital merged as the Lovelace Center for the Health Sciences. In 1985, seeking funding to remodel and expand its aging hospital complex, Lovelace reorganized as a for-profit company, Lovelace Inc., which was jointly owned by the Hospital Corporation of America and the Lovelace Foundation. In 1990, HCA's 80% share of the company was acquired by Cigna, which then bought the remaining 20% in 1991. At the time of the sale, Lovelace operated a 235-bed hospital, 16 clinics, and the 120,000-member HMO. Afterwards, the company was no longer affiliated with the Lovelace Foundation, which remains in operation as the Lovelace Respiratory Research Institute.

In 2002, the company was purchased by Ardent Health Services, which effected a merger between Lovelace and St. Joseph Hospital. This changed Lovelace's structure from its previous self-contained group practice model to a conventional hospital system, and increased the number of hospitals under its control from one to five. The former St. Joseph Regional Medical Center became the flagship hospital of the system and the original Lovelace hospital closed in 2007.

== Hospitals ==
=== Lovelace Medical Center ===
Since 2002, the flagship Lovelace hospital has been the Lovelace Medical Center in the Martineztown-Santa Barbara neighborhood of central Albuquerque. The hospital opened in 1902 as St. Joseph Hospital and was expanded with a new building in 1930 which is now listed on the National Register of Historic Places. The current hospital building was completed in 1968 and has 263 licensed beds.

=== Other hospitals ===
- Lovelace Women's Hospital (opened 1982 as Heights General Hospital; 120 licensed beds)
- Lovelace Westside Hospital (opened 1984 as St. Joseph West Mesa Hospital; 80 licensed beds)
- Lovelace UNM Rehabilitation Hospital (opened 1988; 62 licensed beds)
- Heart Hospital of New Mexico at Lovelace Medical Center (opened 1999; 55 licensed beds)
- Lovelace Regional Hospital, Roswell (27 licensed beds)

=== Former hospital ===
The original Lovelace Medical Center opened in 1952 as Bataan Memorial Methodist Hospital and was remodeled and expanded in 1987. At the time of its closure in 2007, the hospital had 203 licensed beds. In 2021, the city of Albuquerque purchased the former hospital with the intention of turning it into a "Gateway Center" providing shelter and medical services for people experiencing homelessness.
