= List of aviators =

== General ==
While all of these people were pilots (and some still are), many are also noted for contributions in areas such as aircraft design and manufacturing, navigation or popularization.

=== A ===
- Bert Acosta
- Saarah Hameed Ahmed
- John Alcock
- Buzz Aldrin
- Scott Anderson
- Gaby Angelini
- Kimberly Anyadike
- Neil Armstrong
- Ludovic Arrachart
- Jacqueline Auriol

=== B ===
- Douglas Bader
- Richard Bach
- Italo Balbo
- Bernt Balchen
- Mike Bannister
- Pancho Barnes
- João Ribeiro de Barros
- Jean Batten
- André Beaumont
- Amelie Beese
- Elly Beinhorn
- Jean-Pierre Blanchard
- Lilian Bland
- Louis Blériot
- John Nicolaas Block
- William Boeing
- Arthur Whitten Brown
- Miles Browning
- Mrs Victor Bruce
- Milo Burcham
- Beverly Lynn Burns
- Richard Byrd

=== C ===
- Artur de Sacadura Cabral
- Don Cameron
- George Cayley
- Hezârfen Ahmed Çelebi
- Lagâri Hasan Çelebi
- Clyde Cessna
- Touria Chaoui
- Francis Chichester
- Juan de la Cierva
- Henri Coandă
- Jerrie Cobb
- Sir Alan Cobham
- Jackie Cochran
- George Bertram Cockburn
- Bessie Coleman
- François Coli
- Carmela Combe
- Jean Louis Conneau
- Joseph Costa
- Max Conrad
- Dieudonné Costes
- Marcel Courmes
- Gago Coutinho
- Jessica Cox
- Henry Coxwell
- Albert Scott Crossfield
- Glenn Curtiss
- Sharifah Czarena

=== D ===
- Steponas Darius
- Aida de Acosta
- B. H. DeLay
- Jurgis Dobkevičius
- Jimmy Doolittle
- Claudius Dornier
- Donald Douglas
- Douglas Douglas-Hamilton
- Neville Duke
- Hélène Dutrieu

=== E ===
- Amelia Earhart
- Eugene Burton Ely

=== F ===
- Craig Ferguson
- Henri Farman
- Charles Fern
- Anthony Fokker
- Steve Fossett
- Ramón Franco

=== G ===
- Ernest K Gann
- Roland Garros
- Viola Gentry
- Dagoberto Godoy
- Sabiha Gökçen
- Mike Goulian
- Marlon Green
- Henri Guillaumet
- Bartolomeu de Gusmão
- Antanas Gustaitis

=== H ===
- Geoffrey de Havilland
- Mary, Lady Heath
- Ernst Heinkel
- Alex Henshaw
- Hilda Hewlett
- Bert Hinkler
- Bob Hoover
- Howard Hughes

=== I ===
- Abbas Ibn Firnas
- Max Immelmann

=== J ===
- Tony Jannus
- Elrey Borge Jeppesen
- Jiro Horikoshi
- W. E. Johns
- Amy Johnson
- Evelyn Bryan Johnson
- Tex Johnston
- Hubert Julian
- Hugo Junkers

=== K ===
- Bettina Kadner
- Sir Charles Kingsford Smith
- Algene and Fred Key
- Vladimir Kokkinaki
- Opal Kunz

=== L ===
- Clay Lacy
- Raymonde de Laroche
- Ruth Bancroft Law
- Bill Lear
- Alfred LeBlanc
- Léon Lemartin
- Tony LeVier
- Otto Lilienthal
- Charles Lindbergh
- Per Lindstrand
- Alexander Lippisch
- John H. Livingston
- Ormer Locklear

=== M ===
- Eilmer of Malmesbury
- Paul Mantz
- Beryl Markham
- Angela Masson
- Wop May
- Esther Mbabazi
- Frederick McCall
- Marie McMillin
- Mike Melvill
- Jean Mermoz
- Russel Merrill
- Betty Miller
- Billy Mitchell
- R. J. Mitchell
- Geraldine "Jerrie" Mock
- Giribala Mohanty
- Charlotte Möhring
- Jim Mollison
- Montgolfier brothers
- John J. Montgomery
- Ed Musick

=== N ===
- Jorge Newbery
- Charles Nungesser

=== O ===
- Phoebe Omlie

=== P ===
- Clyde Pangborn
- John Lankester Parker
- Ivy May Pearce
- Percy Pilcher
- Francesco de Pinedo
- Albert Plesman
- Paul Poberezny
- Tom Poberezny
- Wiley Post

=== Q ===
- Jeffrey Quill
- Harriet Quimby

=== R ===
- Carol Rabadi
- Bessica Medlar Raiche
- Robert Campbell Reeve
- Molly Reilly
- Ruth Reinhold
- Hanna Reitsch
- Sally Ride
- Margaret Ringenberg
- Keith Rosenkranz
- Yves Rousseau
- Edvard Rusjan
- Mathias Rust
- Dick Rutan

=== S ===
- Antoine de Saint-Exupéry
- Alberto Santos-Dumont
- Blanche Stuart Scott
- Sheila Scott
- Igor Sikorsky
- Elinor Smith
- Sir Ross Smith
- Sir Thomas Sopwith
- Melitta Schenk Gräfin von Stauffenberg
- Katherine Stinson
- John Stringfellow
- Chesley Sullenberger

=== T ===
- Kurt Tank
- Louise Thaden
- Bobbi Trout
- Sean D. Tucker
- Alia Twal

=== V ===
- Polly Vacher
- Traian Vuia

=== W ===
- Patty Wagstaff
- Emily Warner
- Erich Warsitz
- Arthur Whitten-Brown
- Frank Whittle
- Roger Q. Williams
- Zoey Williams
- Orville and Wilbur Wright

=== Y ===
- W.A. Yackey
- Lewis Yancey
- Chuck Yeager
- Jeana Yeager
- John Young

=== Z ===
- Bernard Ziegler

== Military pilots ==
=== A ===
- Asli Hassan Abade
- Muhammad Mahmood Alam
- John Astle

=== B ===
- Richard Bach
- Douglas Bader
- Francesco Baracca
- Kristin Bass
- Arturo Merino Benítez
- Velta Benn
- Brian Binnie
- Mark Binskin
- Billy Bishop
- Richard Bong
- Robert Benedict Bourdillon
- John Boyd
- Pappy Boyington
- Eric Brown
- James E. Brown III
- Roy Brown
- Willa Brown
- Eugene Bullard

=== C ===
- Pierre Clostermann
- Stephen Coonts
- Chip Cravaack

=== D ===
- Benjamin O. Davis Jr.
- Jimmy Doolittle

=== F ===
- Joe Foss

=== G ===
- Yuri Gagarin
- Roland Garros
- Roy Geiger
- Jim Gibbons
- Guy Gibson
- Richard E. Gray

=== H ===
- Erich Hartmann
- Laurie Hawn
- Cedric Howell
- James W. Huston

=== J ===
- James Jabara
- James Denis

=== K ===
- Shawna Rochelle Kimbrell

=== L ===
- Clay Lacy
- Fred Ladd
- Tom Landry
- Hazel Ying Lee
- Lydia Litvyak
- Lee Lue
- Frank Luke

=== M ===
- Mike Mangold
- Edward "Mick" Mannock
- Charles McGee
- Karina Miranda
- Billy Mitchell

=== N ===
- Jorge Newbery

O

- Edward O'Hare
- Lola Odujinrin
- Robin Olds
- Shane Osborn

=== P ===
- Keith Park

=== R ===
- Hanna Reitsch
- Manfred von Richthofen
- Eddie Rickenbacker
- Harry Robinson
- Hans-Ulrich Rudel

=== S ===
- Linda Spoonster Schwartz
- Nirmal Jit Singh Sekhon
- Brian Shul
- Denny Smith
- James Stewart
- Vang Sue

=== T ===
- Stephen W. Thompson
- Hugh Thompson Jr.
- Paul Tibbets
- Siyka Tsoncheva

=== V ===
- Valentina Tereshkova
- Werner Voss

=== W ===
- Douglas (Duke) Warren
- James White

=== Y ===
- W.A. Yackey
- Chuck Yeager

=== Z ===
- Fred Zinn

== Other famous figures with an aviation history ==
The following is a list of notable people from various professions who are also pilots:

=== A ===
- Prince Andrew, Duke of York
- Carl Anthony, American actor
- James Arness, American actor
- David Ascalon, contemporary sculptor and stained glass artist; co-founder of Ascalon Studios

=== B ===
- Dierks Bentley, American country musician
- Prince Bernhard of Lippe-Biesterfeld
- Ryan Bittle, American actor
- Michael Bloomberg, Mayor of New York City from 2002 to 2013
- André Borschberg, Swiss businessman
- Richard Branson, chairman, Virgin Group
- Aaron Buerge, The Bachelor star
- Jimmy Buffett, American singer, songwriter, author, businessman
- Gisele Bündchen, Brazilian model
- George H. W. Bush, 41st President of the United States
- George W. Bush, eldest son of George H. W. Bush and 43rd President of the United States
- Rod Buskas, Canadian ice hockey player

=== C ===
- Maie Casey, Australian pioneer aviator, poet, librettist, biographer, memoirist and artist; wife of Richard Casey; Governor-General of Australia, 1969–74
- Kirby Chambliss, American aerobatics world champion
- Roy Clark, American musician
- Dave Coulier, American actor and comedian
- Tom Cruise, American actor
- Robert Cummings, American actor and aviator

=== D ===
- Roald Dahl, British novelist, short story writer and screenwriter
- Terry Deitz, American television personality
- Glen Dell, South African commercial airline trainer and aerobatics pilot
- John Denver, American country music/folk singer-songwriter and folk rock musician
- Mukul Dev, Indian actor
- Bruce Dickinson, English singer, TV presenter, airline pilot
- Michael Dorn, American actor
- Billie Dove, American actress
- Jerry Doyle, American talk radio host, right-libertarian political commentator and television actor
- Jeff Dunham, American ventriloquist and stand-up comedian.

=== E ===
- Clint Eastwood, American actor, director
- Noel Edmonds, English television presenter and executive
- Carl Edwards, American NASCAR driver
- Hunter Ellis, American television personality

=== F ===
- Craig Ferguson, Scottish-American television host
- Harrison Ford, American actor
- Malcolm Forbes, hot air balloon pilot
- Morgan Freeman, American actor

=== G ===
- Lea Gabrielle, American fighter pilot turned journalist, Correspondent for Fox News Channel
- Rajiv Gandhi, prime minister of India 1984–1989, son of India's first female prime minister Indira Gandhi
- David Gilmour, English musician, best known as the guitarist, lead singer and one of the songwriters in the rock band Pink Floyd
- John Glenn, American astronaut and former Ohio senator
- Hermann Göring, German politician, military leader and a leading member of the Nazi party
- Mark-Paul Gosselaar, American actor
- Kirby Grant, Sky King
- Ken Griffey Jr., Major League Baseball 13-time All-Star

=== H ===
- Najeeb Halaby, Administrator of the United States Federal Aviation Administration and father of Queen Noor of Jordan
- Howard Hawks, American film director, producer and screenwriter of the classic Hollywood era
- Alfred C. Haynes, American Speaker at social events
- Rudolf Hess, prominent figure in Nazi Germany
- Dexter Holland, singer and rhythm guitarist for the Californian punk pop band The Offspring
- Wil Horneff, American actor
- Harry Houdini, Hungarian-American magician and escapologist, stunt performer, actor and film producer
- Gary Hubler, Champion of the Reno Air Races
- Bruce Hyer, Canadian politician

=== J ===
- Angelina Jolie, American actress
- Bart Johnson, American actor
- Steve Jones, Red Bull Air Race World Series competitor

=== K ===
- Greg Kelly, American journalist; youngest son of NYPD commissioner Raymond Kelly; anchor of WNYW (Fox 5 New York)
- John F. Kennedy Jr., son of assassinated U. S. president John F. Kennedy
- John Kerry, U.S. Secretary of State
- B. B. King, musician
- Kris Kristofferson, American writer, singer-songwriter, actor and musician
- Larry Kusche, American author

=== L ===
- Veronica Lake, American actress
- Lorenzo Lamas, American actor
- Cory Lidle, American baseball player
- Per Lindstrand
- Tom Logan, American director, writer, producer, acting instructor, and former actor
- Shane Lundgren, American aviator and commercial aviation businessman and entrepreneur

=== M ===
- William P. MacCracken Jr., First Assistant Secretary of Commerce for Aeronautics
- Joe Manchin, United States Senator and Governor of West Virginia
- Dean Paul Martin, American singer and actor
- Soong Mei-ling, former first lady of China
- John McCain, senior U.S. Senator from Arizona, 2008 U.S. presidential candidate
- Richie McCaw, retired New Zealand rugby great, now working as a helicopter pilot in his homeland
- Jay McGraw, American writer
- Phil McGraw, American television personality; host of Dr. Phil
- Tim McGraw, American actor and musician
- Michael of Romania, the last King of Romania, and one of the last living leaders of World War II
- John Michels, American football player
- Arseny Mironov, Russian aerospace engineer and aviator, scientist in aircraft aerodynamics and flight testing
- Paul Moyer, American journalist; veteran television news broadcaster in Southern California
- Thurman Munson, American baseball player

=== N ===
- Gary Numan, English singer, musician, composer, air display pilot, flying examiner

=== O ===
- Vivek Oberoi, Indian actor
- Miles O'Brien, American journalist; former CNN correspondent
- Susan Oliver, Emmy-nominated American actress, television director and aviator

=== P ===
- Arnold Palmer, late American champion golfer
- Fess Elisha Parker, American actor
- Jake Pavelka, reality TV personality
- Rick Perry, Texas Governor
- Brad Pitt, American actor
- Dave Price, American journalist, Anchor of WNYW (Fox 5 New York), anchor of Good Day New York
- Michael D. Protack, American businessman and candidate for Governor of Delaware

=== Q ===
- Dennis Quaid, American actor

=== R ===
- Lars Rådeström, Swedish fighter aircraft test pilot
- Kangana Ranaut, Indian actress
- Katherine Rawls, multiple United States national champion in swimming and diving in the 1930s
- Christopher Reeve, American actor, director, producer and writer
- Earl W. Renfroe, history maker in the field of orthodontics and in breaking down the barriers of racism
- Rob Riggle, American actor and comedian
- James A. Rice, American attorney, judge, and politician
- Cliff Robertson, American actor
- Ed Robertson, Canadian musician
- Stephen Rogers, Canadian politician
- Charles Rolls, British aviation pioneer
- Kurt Russell, American actor

=== S ===
- Chuck Scarborough, American journalist; veteran television news anchor for WNBC (Channel 4 New York)
- Carlo Schmid, youngest solo pilot to fly around the world
- Jon Scott, American journalist, anchor for Fox News channel
- Al Secord, former NHL player
- Ryan Shore, Grammy and Emmy Award-nominated composer for film, television, games, theater and records
- Nevil Shute, popular British novelist; successful aeronautical engineer
- Dean Smith, American pioneer pilot
- James Stewart, popular American actor

=== T ===
- J. R. D. Tata, Indian industrialist
- Ratan Naval Tata, Indian industrialist
- Norman Tebbit, British Conservative politician
- John Travolta, American actor
- Ariel Tweto, one of two daughters of the Alaska airline family

=== U ===
- Dieter F. Uchtdorf, Second Counselor in the First Presidency of The Church of Jesus Christ of Latter-day Saints

=== V ===
- Gore Vidal, American novelist, screenwriter, playwright, essayist, short story writer, actor and politician
- Mike Vogel, American actor
- Pavel Vlasov, Russian test pilot, Hero of the Russian Federation
- Igor Volk, Soviet test pilot, cosmonaut, Hero of the Soviet Union

=== W ===
- Bonny Warner, American luger
- Frank Welker, American actor, best known for the thousands of voices he performs in television and films including Freddie in Scooby-Doo and Megatron in the Transformers franchise.
- Prince William, Duke of Cambridge
- Willem-Alexander of the Netherlands, King of the Netherlands and part-time KLM pilot
- Alverna Babbs Williams, First American pilot with disabilities to earn a pilot's license
- Ted Williams, left fielder in Major League Baseball

== See also ==
- List of Russian aviators
- List of women aviators
