= Hart Schaffner Marx =

American menswear manufacturer

Hartmarx Corporation
- Type: Subsidiary
- Industry: Consumer Goods
- Founded: 1887; 139 years ago
- Founder: Harry and Max Hart
- Headquarters: Des Plaines, Illinois
- Area served: United States
- Key people: Homi B. Patel (Chairman of the Board) (President) & (CEO)
- Products: Textile - Apparel Clothing
- Revenue: ▲US$ 564.87 Million (2007)
- Operating income: ▲US$ 2.49 Million (2007)
- Net income: ▲US$ -4.18 Million (2007)
- Total assets: ▲US$ 269.55 Million (2007)
- Total equity: ▲US$ 228.04 Million (2007)
- Number of employees: 3,800
- Parent: Authentic Brands Group
- Website: hartschaffnermarx.com

Hart Schaffner Marx is an American manufacturer of ready-to-wear menswear owned by New York City–based Authentic Brands Group. With origins dating to a family business in 1872 Chicago and incorporated in 1911 as "Hart Schaffner & Marx", the company is now located in Des Plaines, Illinois.

== Origins ==
Hart Schaffner Marx's origins date to 1872 when brothers Harry and Max Hart opened a small men's clothing store on Chicago's State Street called "The Great Globe One-Price Clothier," with proprietors advertised as Harry Hart & Bro. In 1879, the Harts' brothers-in-law, Levi Abt and Marcus Marx, joined the partnership, which was then renamed Hart, Abt & Marx. Eight years later, Marx and Abt left the business and a cousin, Joseph Schaffner (1848–1918) joined the firm and it was renamed Hart, Schaffner & Marx.

During its earliest years, the company produced work clothes sold in its own store and through other retailers in the U.S. South and Midwest. On the strength of wholesale production, Hart, Abt & Marx won contracts to produce clothing for the U.S. military. Sometime after 1880, as the company's wholesale business began to grow overtaking retail operations, its Chicago retail store was closed

Gradually in the 1880s and 1890s, the company began to specialize in better-quality men's suits, overcoats, raincoats, and trousers sold at wholesale to retail clothiers, first in the states surrounding its Chicago Hub, then gradually nationwide. As early as spring 1893, the company advertised suit sizes for "stout" and "slim" men.

== 20th-century history ==
In 1910 the company was affected by the Chicago garment workers' strike, also known as the Hart, Schaffner, and Marx strike, which led to improved conditions for workers, the first union contract with an arbitration provision, and the founding of the Amalgamated Clothing Workers of America.

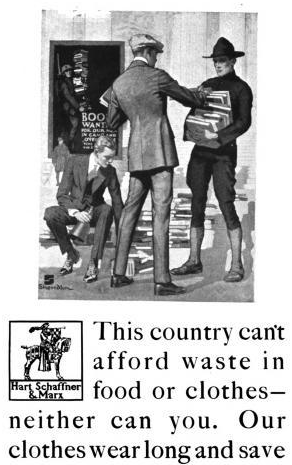
Hart Schaffner & Marx advertisement by John E. Sheridan, 1919

On May 10, 1911, after years of steady growth, the partnership was incorporated. During World War I, the company introduced the first tropical worsted suits and the company's facilities were used to produce uniforms.

In 1926, the company expanded retail operations by acquiring Wallach's, a large New York City–based clothing chain, followed by Chicago retail clothier Baskin the following year. The company produced uniforms for the military during World War II.

During the 1950s and 1960s, the company continued to expand with the acquisition of clothing manufacturer Society Brand, a major manufacturing house in 1952. Hickey Freeman, a premier men's clothing brand and retailer of Rochester, New York, was acquired in 1964; Jaymar-Ruby and Kleinhans in 1967. In 1969, M. Wile manufacturer of Buffalo, New York. After these major acquisitions, an antitrust suit against the company led to a consent degree barring any further acquisitions, without court approval, for ten years.

A year before the agreement expired, the company acquired Intercontinental Apparel, U.S. licensee of the Pierre Cardin brand. After acquiring Bishop's men's shops, the company expanded into women's clothing, with the 1981 acquisition of the Country Miss chain. The Kuppenheimer Manufacturing Company, retailer of inexpensive suits with 41 retail outlets, was acquired in 1982, for $25.8 million (~$70.7 million in 2024). On November 1, 1982, the company changed its name to Hartmarx Corporation, with the new parent company acting as a holding company for various subsidiaries.

The company acquired Briar Neckwear in July 1985 and in December 1986 acquired the casual suit jacket manufacturer H. Ortisky. The following year Hart Schaffner & Marx took over the nine-store Detroit retail chain Anton's, and in 1988 purchased Boyd's, a small retail chain in St. Louis, and the Washington, D.C.–based upscale retailer Raleigh's. In February 1989 the company also added the Biltwell Company, a clothing manufacturer. By 1992, the company experienced continuing losses and divested itself of all retail outlets, except the Kuppenheimer chain. The company sold its 91-store Kuppenheimer unit and two tailored clothing factories in 1995.

The 1990s was a period of offshoring of production facilities to control costs. During that period, Hart, Schaffner & MArx closed ten domestic factories and shifted production to China, Mexico, and Costa Rica. Expansion continued in this period with the acquisition in late 1996 of bankrupt Plaid Clothing Group, Inc., a maker and marketer of men's tailored suits, sportcoats, and slacks; Pusser's Ltd., including the Pusser's of the West Indies line of nautical and tropical sportswear and outerwear in 1998; and in December 1998; Coppley, Noyes and Randall Limited, a leading Canadian maker of men's tailored clothing. In August of the following year, the company acquired Royal Shirt Company, a Canadian maker of women's and men's dress and sports shirts.

The label enjoyed considerable publicity during the 2008 Presidential campaign when then-U.S. Senator Barack Obama wore the brand extensively, including suits tailored especially for his acceptance speech and the 2009 Presidential Inaugural Address. Obama expressed a personal affinity for the brand, based in his hometown Chicago.

The company and its United States subsidiaries filed for bankruptcy on January 23, 2009. At the time, the company said its Canadian and other non-U.S. affiliates had not sought bankruptcy protection. Workers threatened to occupy Hartmarx's plant if the company's creditor, Wells Fargo Bank, attempted to lay off workers and liquidate the company's assets. On June 22, 2009, Hartmarx Corp. received five bids for its assets in its bankruptcy proceedings. Bidders included Emerisque/SKNL North America, Affliction Clothing Co., Perry Ellis, and Versa Capital Management. In August 2009, Emerisque Brands UK and its partner SKNL North America completed their purchase of Hartmarx.

Hart Schaffner & Marx became the flagship brand of HMX Group, a holding company. HMX sold most of its assets to the New York–based Authentic Brands Group in 2012 for an undisclosed price following Chapter 11 bankruptcy proceedings.

During the COVID-19 pandemic, the Hart Schaffner Marx plant in Des Plaines was closed and 300 workers were furloughed. When it reopened, workers sewed thousands of face masks for essential workers.

== Advertising ==
Hart, Schaffner & Marx pioneered nationwide newspaper advertising for ready-made men's clothing, stylebooks and other "point-of-purchase" sales and marketing materials, and naturally posed models in menswear advertising illustrations.

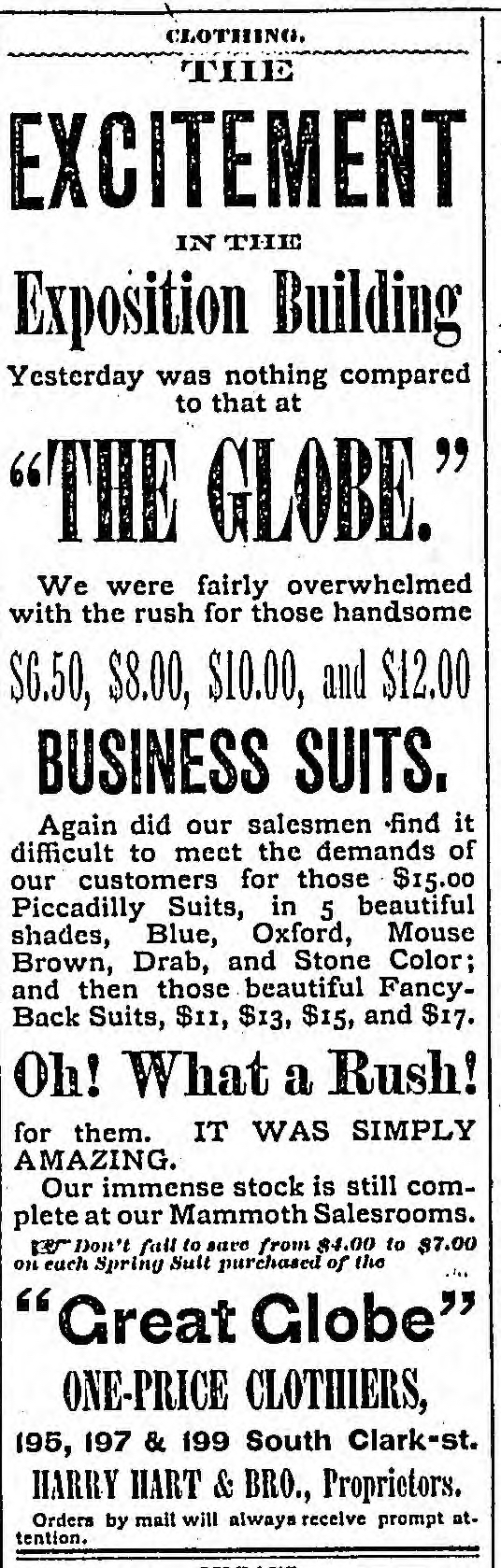
Ad for Harry Hart & Bros.' "Great Globe" One-Price Clothiers, Chicago Tribune (June 3, 1880), p.1.

The Hart, Schaffner & Marx name appears in dealer newspaper ads as early as 1889, with language suggesting its name and goods were well-known and respected in the trade. Beginning in fall 1894, dealers that carried the company's clothes ran illustrated newspaper ads throughout the Midwest and Plains states. Similarities in the illustrations and copy of these ads suggests the company provided dealers with locally-customizable printing plates and sample ad copy. Between 1895 and 1900, the company produced a fashion magazine/style book titled Art in Dress distributed via dealers and by mail directly to consumers.

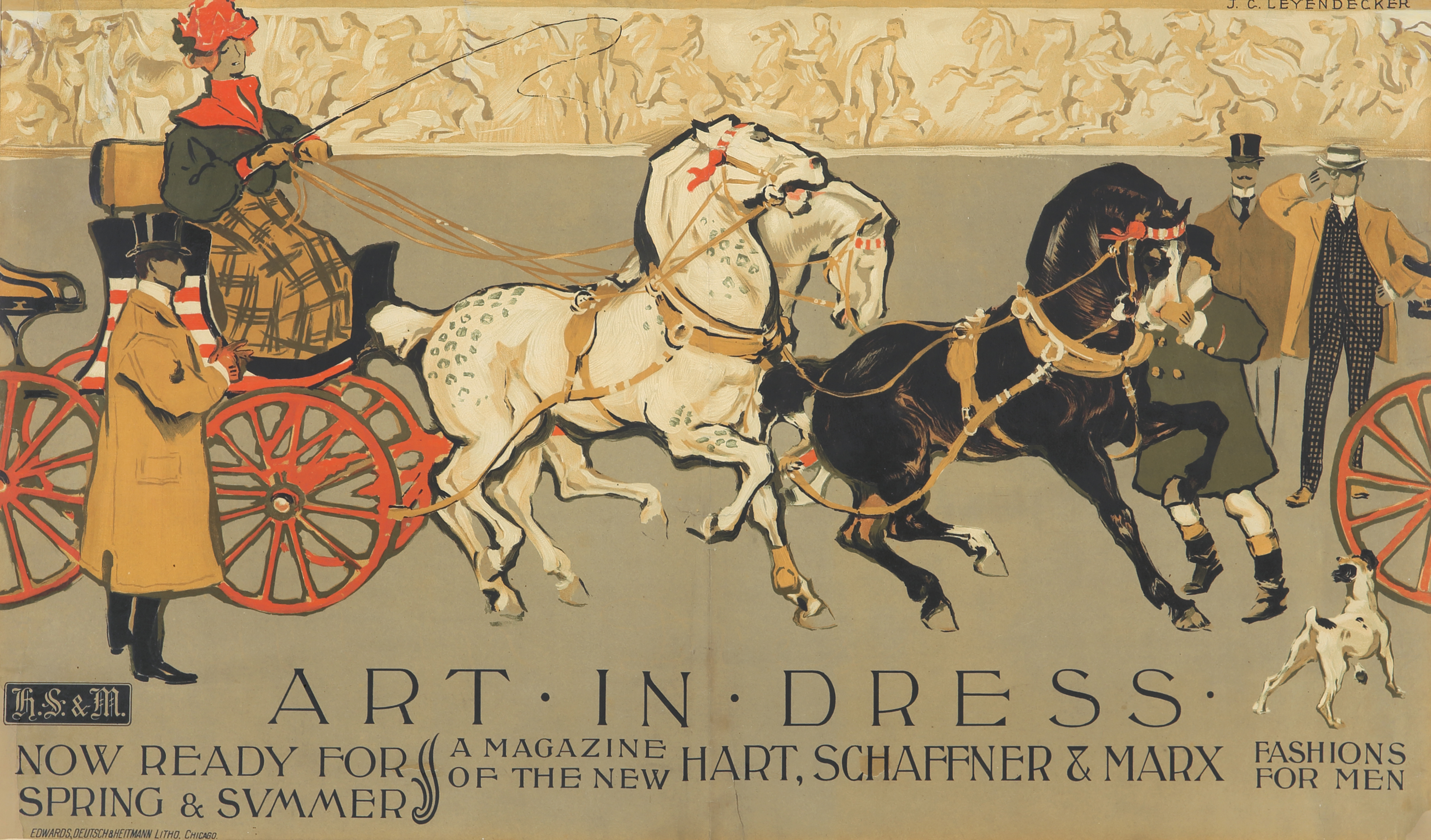
J. C. Leyendecker, "The Horse Show," ca. 1895-98, for HSM fashion magazine Art In Dress

Beginning in 1898, the company ran its own ads in U.S. mass-audience magazines including The Youth's Companion, Century, Saturday Evening Post, and Ladies' Home Journal.

Starting in the early 1890s, Hart, Schaffner & Marx commissioned well-known illustrators to create artwork for its advertisements, style books, direct mail literature, and retail posters. These illustrators included Henry Benjamin Wechsler, J. C. Leyendecker, Samuel Nelson Abbott, Edward Penfield, Herbert Paus, Leon Gordon, and John Sheridan. The company's advertising and marketing materials often depicted young, fashionable, college-aged men who were the company's target audience beginning in the 1890s.

== Branding ==
The Hart, Schaffner & Marx brand name and identity dates back to the company's advertising and marketing efforts in the early 1890s. One of its major goals was the creation and promotion of the "H. S. & M" trademarked clothing label—a black rectangle with the letters "H. S. & M" in white, gothic script—and brand.

In 1966 television host Johnny Carson walked on stage to deliver his nightly Tonight Show monologue wearing a turtleneck sweater and a collarless Nehru jacket. Because of the overwhelming popularity of the style, Hart Schaffner & Marx entered into an agreement to market a new casual line of suits under the Johnny Carson name and later, under the Bobby Jones and Jack Nicklaus brands.

Hart Schaffner & Marx introduced the Austin Reed brand name during the 1960s. In 1974 the company rolled out a line of tailored clothing under the Christian Dior name, followed by Nino Cerruti, Allyn St. George, and Playboy. These new lines were created under contract to their designer namesakes and proved highly successful as fashion leaders. In 1979, Pierre Cardin was added to the company's list of designers. In the late 1990s, two new lines, Perry Ellis and Daniel Hechter, were introduced. The latter was positioned within the popular-priced segment and the former resided within the moderate sector. The Tommy Hilfiger line was also introduced as business casual wear. In 1996, with the acquisition of Plaid Clothing Group, Inc., brands including Burberry, Liz Claiborne, Evan-Picone, Palm Beach, and Brannoch were added to the Hartmarx stable.

In July 2016, David Hart created a capsule collection for Hart Schaffner Marx Men's RTW Spring 2017 named Hart by Hart. The collection was inspired by Slim Aarons photographs of tropical locales.

== See also ==
- Brooks Brothers
- J. Press
- Gant
- Paul Stuart
