= Lola Odujinrin =

British-born Nigerian aircraft pilot

Ademilola “Lola” Odujinrin is a British-born Nigerian aircraft pilot. In 2017, he became the first African pilot in history to fly solo around the world.

== Biography ==
Ademilola “Lola” Odujinrin
- Notable work: The First African pilot in history to fly solo around the world

Lola was born in South London and moved to Nigeria at a young age. When he was 20 years old, he qualified for his Private Pilot License (PPL) in 19 days. Lola was trained in the UK and US flying for Arik Air for five years before working for Air Djibouti. Since earning his commercial license in 2011 Lola has logged over 4,000 hours as a commercial Boeing 737 pilot as of 2017.

Lola completed his "One Man, One Plane" expedition on March 29, 2017. He landed at Washington Dulles International Airport, the same airport he departed from in June 2016. In completing his journey, he became the first African and the ninth British pilot to fly around the world solo. Lola is one of only 117 people in the world to have achieved this, more people have currently flown into space than have flown around the world solo. The flight was part of Project Transcend, a foundation which aims to inspire young people in order to achieve their goals regardless of their personal circumstances. Lola was 38 years old when he began his journey which he had been planning since 2014. He flew for nine months, stopping in more than 15 countries on five continents. The flight was completed in a specially configured light single aircraft, Cirrus SR22, which could fly for around four hours before needing to refuel. The aircraft weighed around half the size of an average family car. Lola faced several problems both before and during his trip. On his first flight he had to start a Go Fund Me page in order to pay for petrol; he also took three long stops throughout the expedition to earn money to be able to continue. Lola met fellow pilot Bruce Dickinson during his journey, who helped to fund the rest of his journey.

The expedition saw Odujinrin fly from Washington to Canada, via John F. Kennedy International Airport, then to Iceland, Scotland, England, Valencia, Malta, Egypt, Djibouti, Oman, Pakistan, Bangladesh and Thailand. From Thailand, it took him 4 weeks to arrive in Darwin, Australia. He did not make a stop in Africa, reportedly due to a lack of corporate sponsorship in Nigeria.

The largest height in which a light single aircraft has flown is 56,000 feet and Lola is currently planning to break this record and reach 60,000 feet.

Lola also collaborated with Olasubomi Iginla Aina on the Bag of Hope Project, touring schools across England to raise awareness about the United Nations Convention on the Rights of the Child.

=== Employment tribunals ===
Odujinrin worked for West Atlantic UK. He brought an employment tribunal claim against them, but withdrew it in 2018.

He worked for Ryanair from 2019 to 2024. He was fired for under-reporting safety violations in two mishandled go-arounds. An employment tribunal judge described Odujinrin as displaying "a shocking lack of insight" into his own conduct.
