= Yackey Monoplane =

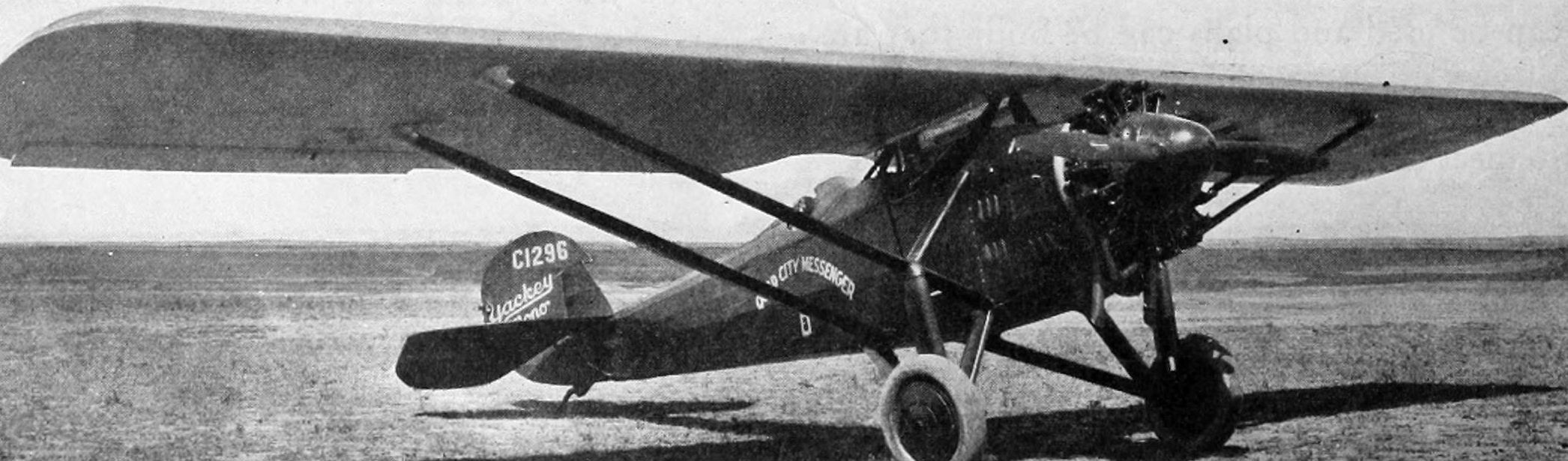

General information
- Type: Light three seat passenger or mail carrier
- National origin: United States
- Manufacturer: Yackey Aircraft Company
- Designer: Wilfred Yackey
- Number built: 2

History
- First flight: 1927

The Yackey Monoplane was an American three seat parasol monoplane flown in the late 1920s. Two prototypes had some success in the 1927 New York - Spokane National Air Derby and orders were placed but a crash killed its designer and ended production.

== Design and development ==
The Yackey monoplane had a parasol wing built around two spruce box spars with plywood skinning ahead of the forward spar. It used the popular Clark Y airfoil and had a constant chord with blunt tips. It was braced to the fuselage on pairs of parallel struts to the lower fuselage longerons, and a central, short inverted vee cabane to the top of the fuselage.

It was powered by a 225 hp (168 kW) Wright Whirlwind J-5 9-cylinder radial mounted in the nose with its cylinders exposed for cooling. The fuselage was flat-sided apart from raised upper decking. Both the cockpits were open, with the two passengers placed side-by-side over the wing with entry via full-depth doors. The pilot sat just aft of the wing trailing edge, where a cut-out provided a wider upper field of view. Baggage or mail was placed in a large hold behind the pilot. Its fuselage tapered rearwards to a cropped-triangular fin with a comma profile, balanced rudder. The tailplane was semi-elliptical in plan and mounted on top of the fuselage, each side braced from below with a strut and a parallel wire and from above with a wire to the fin. Elevators were full and rounded, with a large gap between them for rudder movement.

The Yaxley had fixed, conventional landing gear with large wheels, each fitted with brakes and on half-axles mounted on the lower fuselage longerons. Short, vertical legs were mounted on the forward wing struts which were reinforced at those points by diagonal struts to the wing centre-section. Drag struts sloped upwards to the root of the rear wing strut. Its spring-steel tailskid was steerable.

== Operational history ==
The two prototypes took part in the 1927 National Air Derby, a 24 hour race between New York and Spokane. One, piloted by Hamilton Lee, gained fifth place and a $500 prize.

By October 1927 Yackey had rebuilt and reorganized his two factories for serial production at an initial rate of one in three weeks, moving to one a week at the start of 1928. They had firm orders for five. However, these plans were abandoned after 4 October when Yackey died making a final test flight of a Monoplane before handing it over to its new owner. A newly reinforced wing bracing failed during the programme of aerobatics he routinely used in a final, personal test of all his aircraft.

== Specifications ==
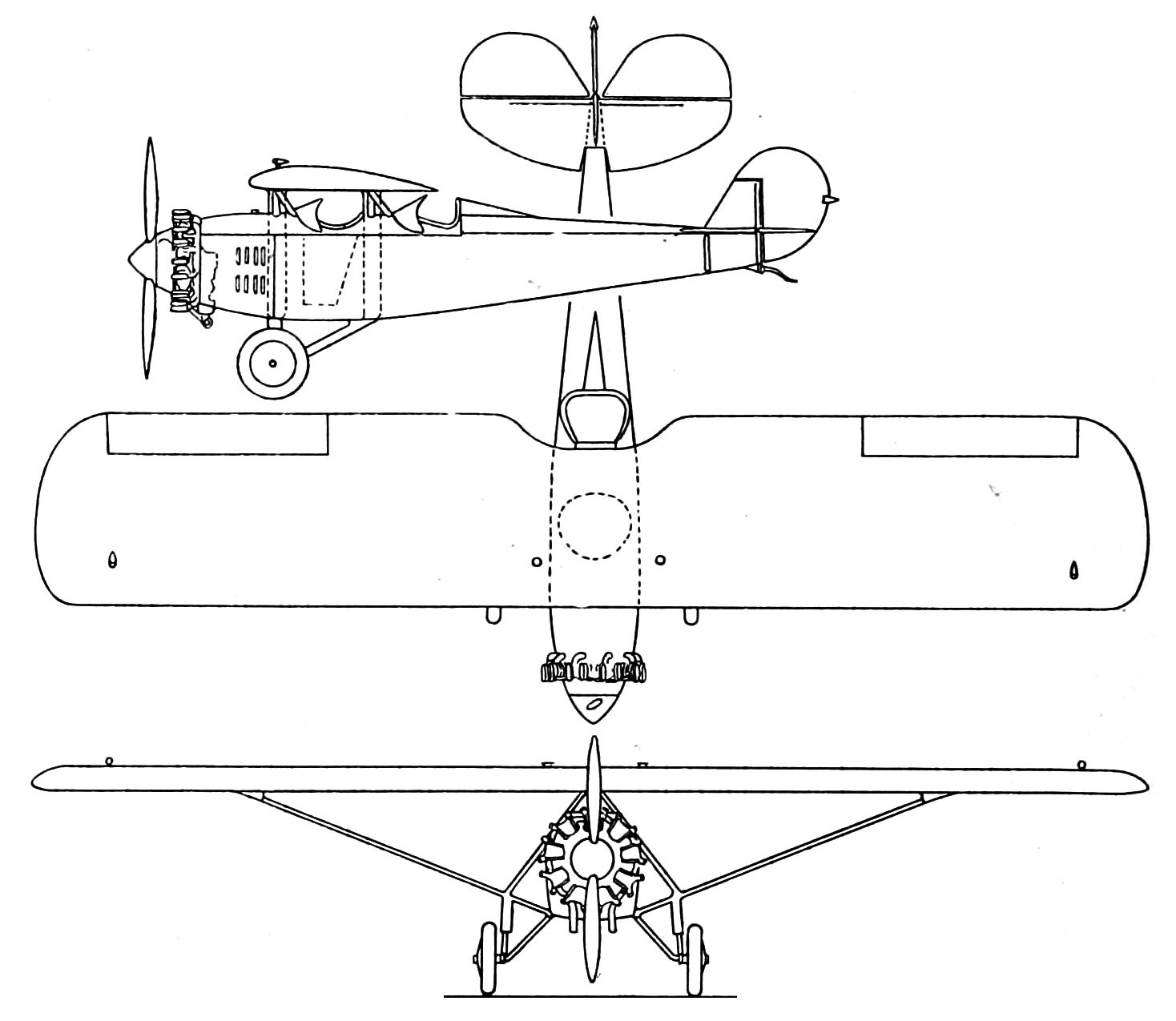

Data from Aero Digest 1927,

General characteristics

- Crew: One
- Capacity: Two passengers
- Length: 26 ft 2 in (7.98 m)
- Wingspan: 41 ft 2 in (12.55 m)
- Height: 8 ft 4 in (2.54 m)
- Wing area: 284 sq ft (26.4 m^{2})
- Airfoil: Clark Y
- Empty weight: 1,460 lb (662 kg) 2460
- Fuel capacity: 84 US gal (70 imp gal; 320 L)
- Payload: 1,000 lb (450 kg)
- Powerplant: 1 × Wright J-5 Whirlwind 9-cylinder air-cooled radial piston engine, 225 hp (168 kW)
- Propellers: 2-bladed Standard Steel

Performance

- Maximum speed: 140 mph (230 km/h, 120 kn)
- Cruise speed: 115 mph (185 km/h, 100 kn) at 1,600 rpm
- Stall speed: 40 mph (64 km/h, 35 kn)
- Landing speed: 40 mph (64 km/h; 35 kn)
