= Grade monoplane =

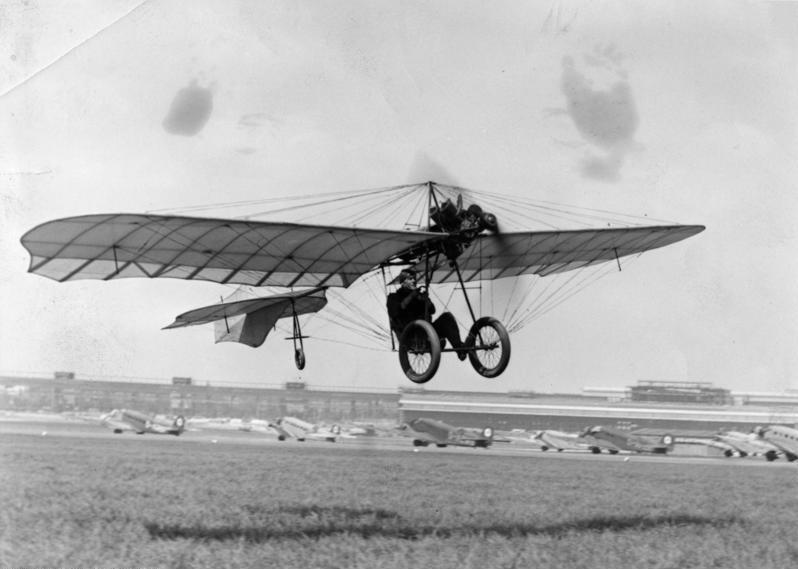

General information
- Type: sports aircraft
- National origin: Germany
- Designer: Hans Grade
- Number built: ~80

History
- First flight: 17 August 1909

The Grade monoplane was a single-seat aircraft constructed by Hans Grade in 1909. It was the first successful heavier-than-air aircraft produced in Germany, and around 80 were eventually built.

== Design and development ==
The aircraft was a high-wing monoplane, with the pilot sitting below the wing. A pair of inverted V struts formed the fabric-covered cabane structure which carried the upper bracing wires: the front struts were continued below the wing, with the forward struts bearing the mainwheels. An elongated cruciform tail unit was attached to the end of a single boom by a universal joint immediately behind the single tailwheel. Lateral control was effected by wing-warping. It was powered by a 12 kW (18 hp) two-stroke air-cooled V-4 engine, also built by Grade, which drove a two-bladed aluminium bladed propeller.

== Operational history ==
The aircraft was first flown on 17 August 1909 A series of longer flights were made in September, and on October 30 Grade won the Lanz prize of 40,000 marks for the first German-built aeroplane to fly in a figure 8 round two markers a kilometre apart.

Grade used the money from winning the Lanz prize to establish an aircraft manufacturing business and flying school at Bork, near Magdeburg. The aircraft were sold for 12,000 marks, the price including a course of flying instruction.

Grade competed with some success at the Heliopolis aviation meeting held in Egypt in January 1910, when he won one of the daily speed and distance competitions by flying 20 km (12 mi) in 22 m 57 sec.

Charlotte Möhring, from Pankow near Berlin, was the second German woman to obtain pilot's licence (no. 285 issued 7 September 1912) flying a Grade monoplane

An example was bought by the Japanese army, and was the first aeroplane to be flown in Japan.

== Survivors ==
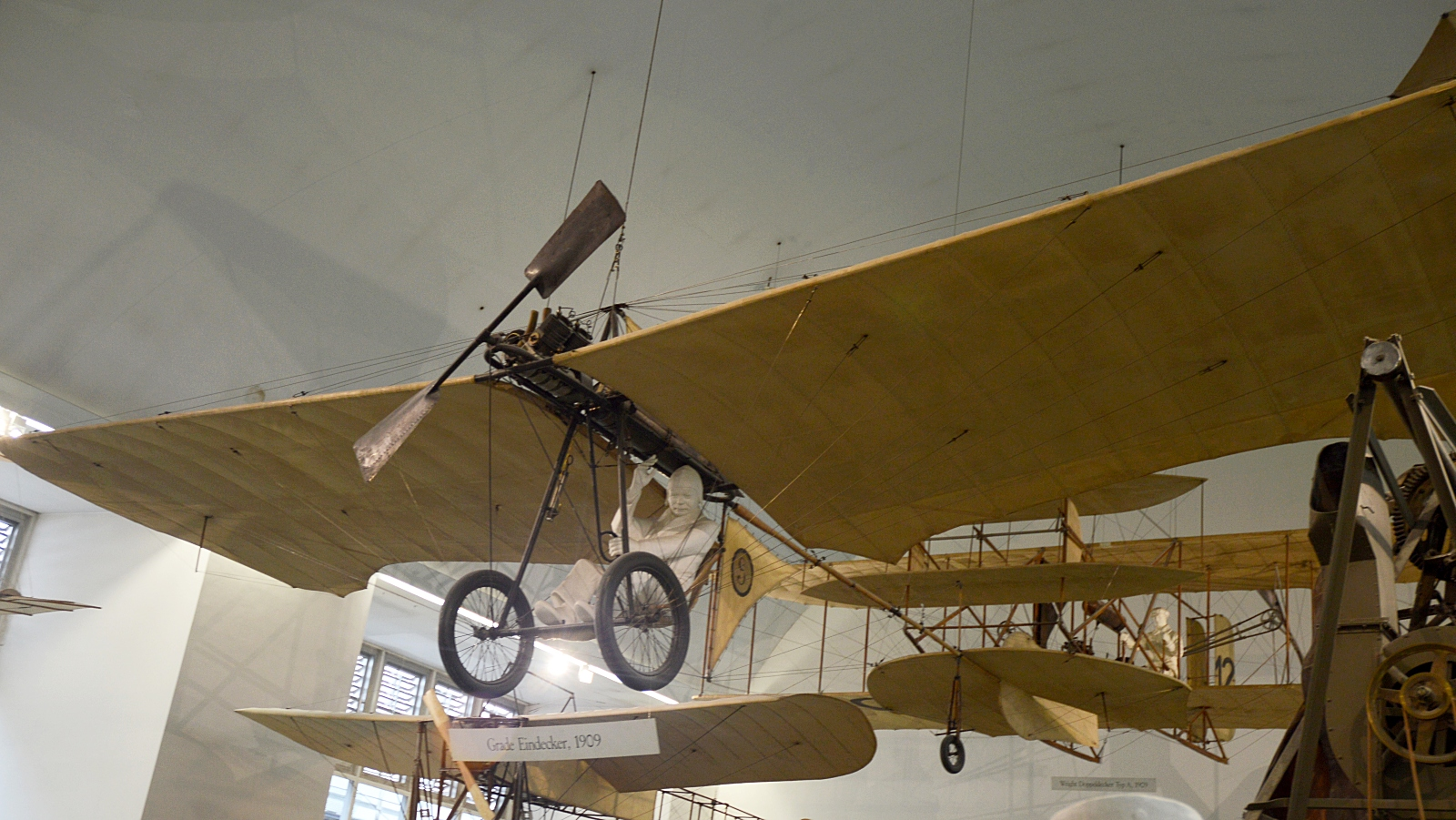
Grade's second machine, now in the Deutsches Museum of Science and Technology's Aeronautics Collection, Munich, Germany

- A restored aircraft is on display at the Magdeburg Technikmuseum.
- A restored aircraft is on display at the Deutsches Museum in Munich, with the original engine displayed separately.
- A replica is displayed at the Kakamigahara Aerospace Science Museum

== Specifications ==
Data from Deutsches Museum, Munich

General characteristics

- Crew: 1
- Wingspan: 10.2 m (33 ft 6 in)
- Wing area: 25 m^{2} (270 sq ft)
- Empty weight: 125 kg (276 lb)
- Gross weight: 200 kg (441 lb)
- Powerplant: 1 × Grade air-cooled V-4 two-stroke piston engine, 12 kW (16 hp)
- Propellers: 2-bladed, 1.83 m (6 ft 0 in) diameter

Performance

- Maximum speed: 60 km/h (37 mph, 32 kn)
