= Božena Laglerová =

Czech aviator (1886–1941)

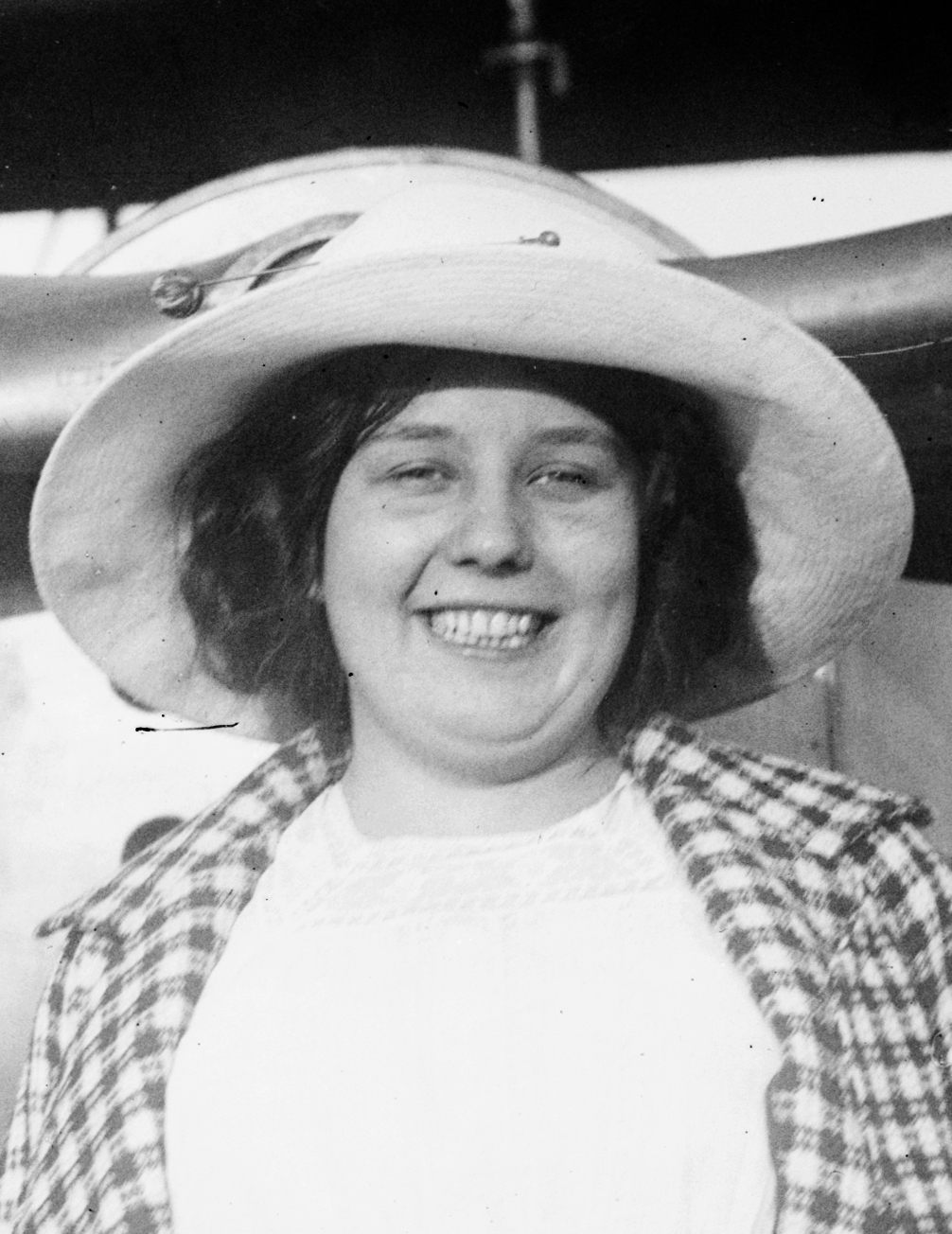
- Božena Laglerová in 1913
- Born: Božena Gabriela Vítězslava Laglerová; 11 December 1888; Vinohrady, Bohemia, Austria-Hungary
- Died: 8 October 1941 (aged 52); Prague, Protectorate of Bohemia and Moravia
- Occupation: Aviator

Božena Gabriela Vítězslava Laglerová (11 December 1888 – 8 October 1941) was a Czech pioneer aviator. She become the first female pilot in Austria-Hungary. She competed in air competitions.

== Biography ==
Laglerová was born in Vinohrady (now part of Prague), Bohemia, Austria-Hungary on 11 December 1888. She was a accomplished opera singer and sculptor before embarking on her aviation career.

Laglerová was the seventh and final child of Jozefa Počtová and Vojtěch Lagler. A graduate of the Prague Conservatory in 1906, she initially joined the vocal ensemble of the Vinohrady Theatre, where she was later promoted to soloist in 1908.

During the dress rehearsal of her first performance, she lost her voice, and despite retraining in Paris, a vocal cord injury ended her performance career. To supplement her musical pursuits, Laglerová studied sculpture at the School of Applied Arts, however her interests soon turned towards aviation.

Upon returning home to Prague, she began attending the Czech Technical University, where her brother-in-law Václav Felix, was a professor in the field of experimental physics and an aviation fan. However, she faced considerable resistance and rejection as a woman seeking a pilot's license. Despite these challenges, she successfully earned her international license in Germany in 1911.

In Germany, she used the surname "Lagler" and became the first female student of Hans Grade at his pilot school in Borken, Germany. She crashed shortly before her final exam in May 1911, and sustained fractured vertebrae, a spinal injury and contusions. She returned to Prague to recuperate and successfully completed her training at the flight school by September of that year. She became the first female pilot in Austria-Hungary, 13th in the world and the first woman licensed by the Austrian Aero Club, as license #37 on 10 October 1911. On 19 October 1911, she became the second woman licensed by Germany, as license #125.

Laglerová competed in air competitions, internationally and across Europe. Following her successes in Europe, she sought better opportunities as a pilot from 1912 to 1913 in Cuba, the Dominican Republic, and New York. A certain Mr. Lutge had offered a "tour" through the Caribbean, and Laglerová, a pilot by the name of Schuphaus as well as a mechanic, gladly accepted the offer. It was on this tour that Laglerová became known affectionately as La Aviadora. Unfortunately, the impresario was a fraud and subsequently disappeared with their finances. It took the trio over a year to work their way back to Europe.

Laglerová's aspirations to become a combat pilot or flight instructor during World War I were unsuccessful. After the War, Laglerová married flight instructor Josef Peterka on 22 April 1919, eventually ceasing her flying activities. However, she devoted her later years to promoting aviation, teaching singing and writing about her travels. In 1925, she ran in parliamentary elections for the National Workers' Party, and wrote for the magazine Letec.

She died on 8 October 1941, in Prague and is buried in the cemetery in Prague-Bubeneč.

== Legacy and honours ==
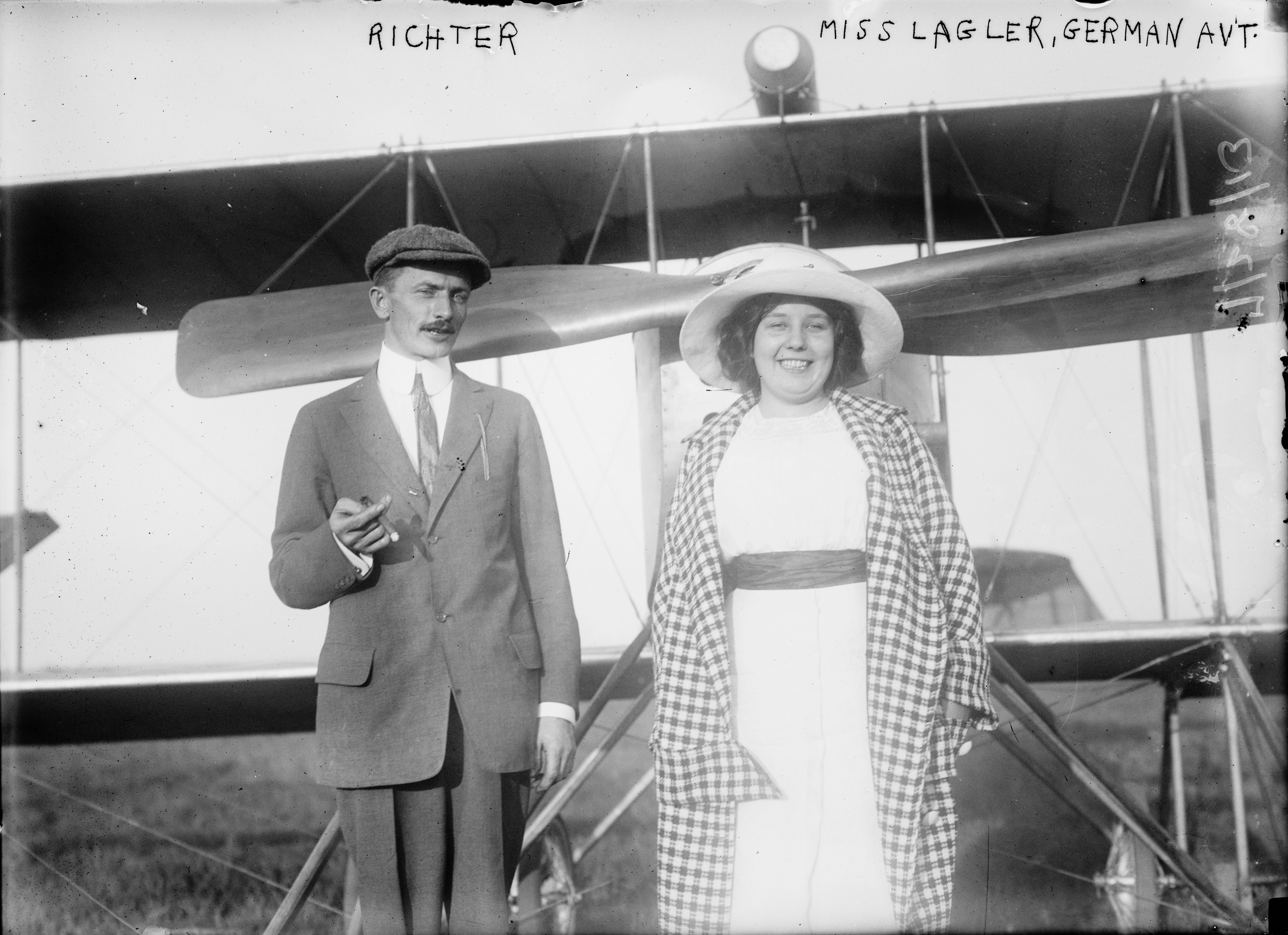
Joseph P. Richter and Božena Laglerová

Over time, Lagerlová's grave at Bubeneč fell into disrepair. The Czech Aviation Journalists' Club campaigned for its restoration and enlisted the help of the Metoděj Vlach Aviation Museum in Mladá Boleslav, the Czech Association of Female Pilots and Civil Aviation Authority of the Czech Republic. As of 2024, the headstone now features her portrait and a sketch of the Grade aeroplane she flew.

A dance entitled "Božena" premiered at La Fabrika in Prague on 5 May 2019. It was created and performed by the circus and mime trio Holektiv, consisting of Andrea Vykysalá, Karolína Křížková, and Eva Stará to pay tribute to the optimistic aviator's spirit.

In April 2025 a statue titled "Courage" was unveiled in Prague, commemorating Laglerová along with hockey player Augustin Bubník. The work emerged from an art competition announced as part of an urban transformation.
