= Grade Automobilwerke =

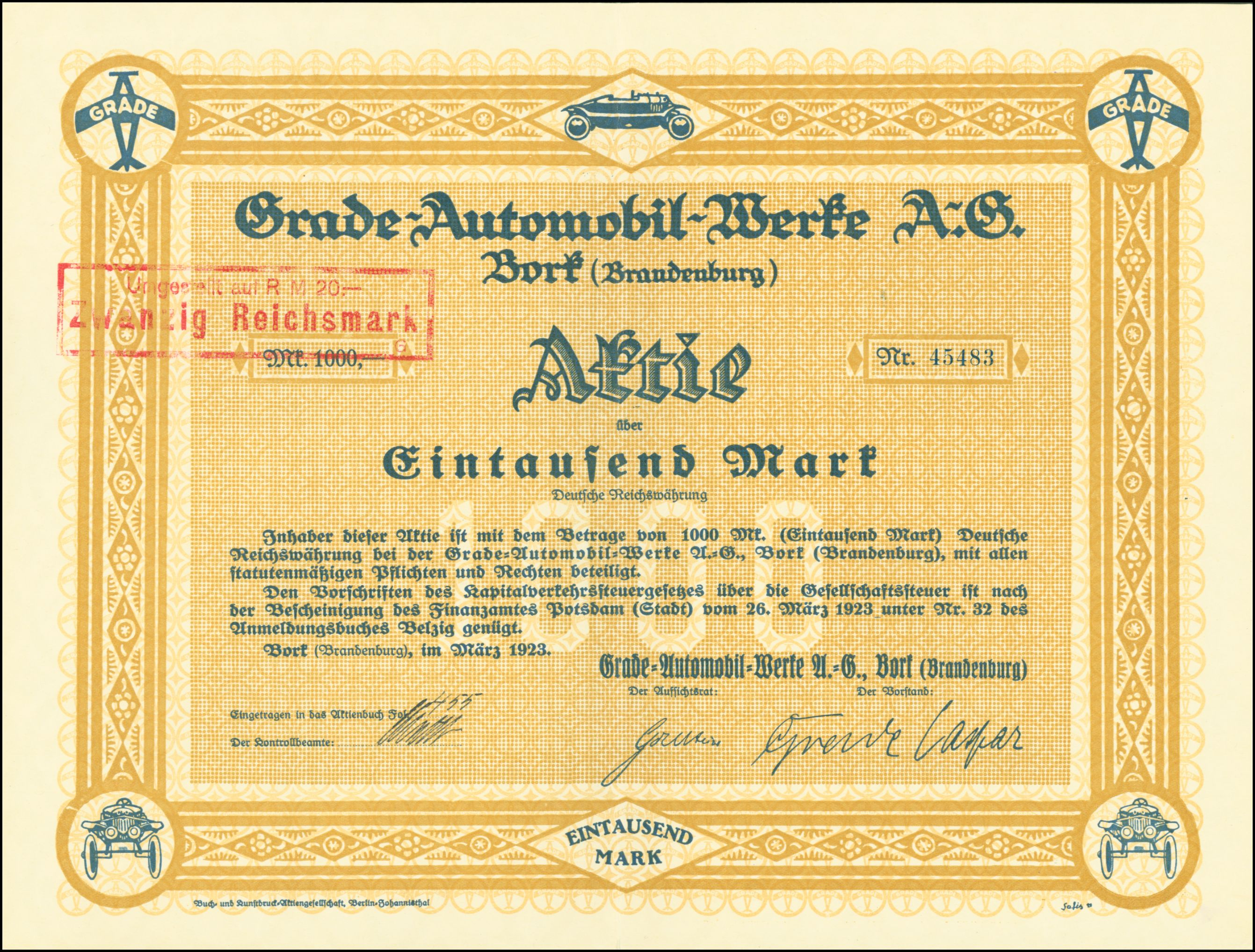
Share of the Grade-Automobil-Werke AG, issued March 1923

Grade-Automobil-Werke AG was an automobile manufacturing company established by the German aviation pioneer Hans Grade in 1921. It was closed in the late 1920s.

The company produced roughly 2000 units of the model "Grade Personenkraftwagen", a small, two-person leisure and racing car.

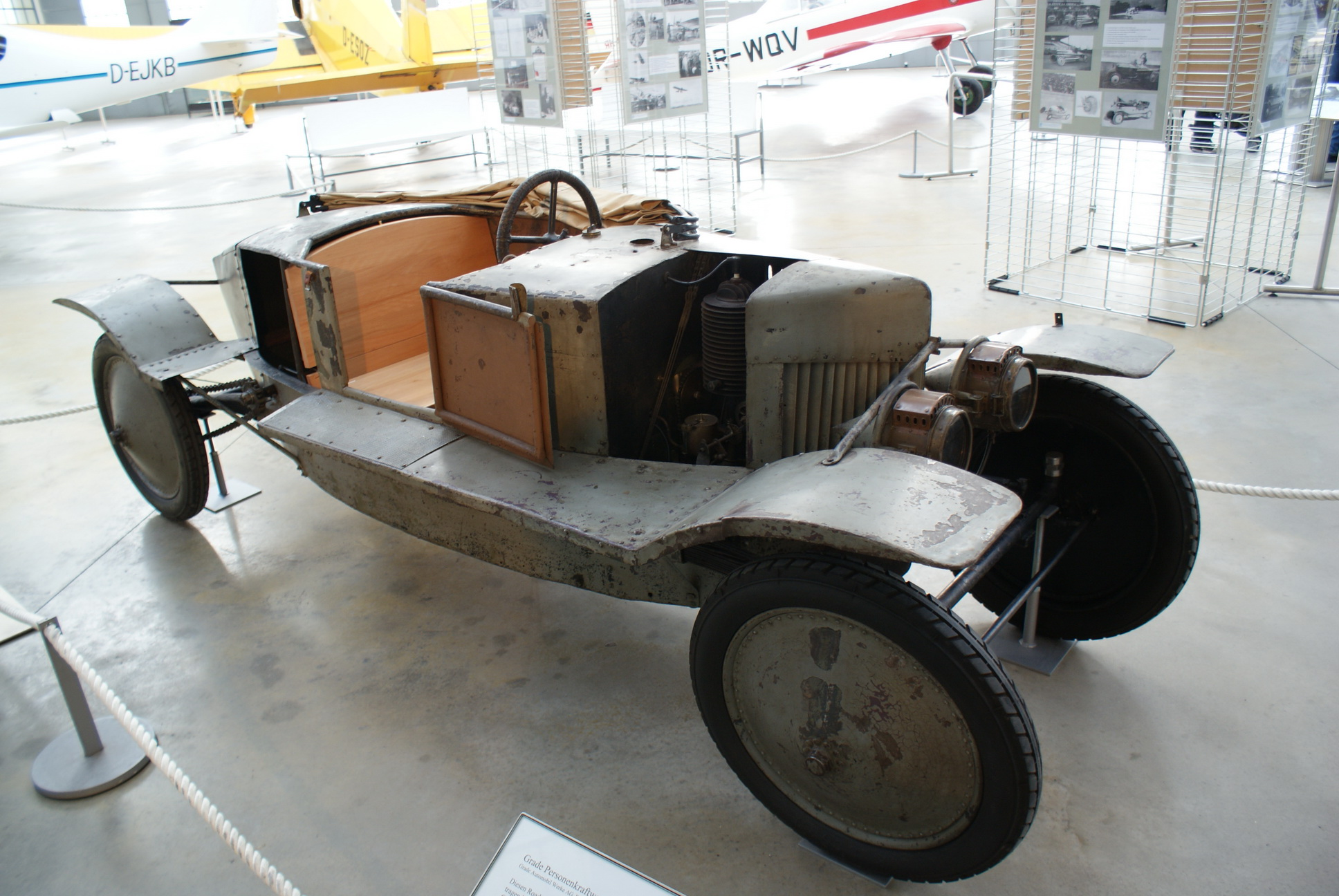
Grade Personenkraftwagen - Aviation Museum Oberschleissheim
