= Siyka Tsoncheva =

Bulgarian military pilot

- Born: September 22, 1926; Dzhulunitsa, Veliko Tarnovo Province, Bulgaria
- Died: September 17, 1971 (aged 44); Mala Tserkva, Bulgaria
- Occupation(s): Aviator, Pilot
- Known for: The only Bulgarian woman who has piloted a military, civil plane and helicopter

Siyka Kostadinova Tsoncheva (1926–1971) was a Bulgarian military pilot, and the only Bulgarian woman to ever pilot a military plane, civil plane, sea plane and helicopter. During her piloting career she flew at least 11 types of airplanes.

== Life ==
Siyka Tsoncheva was born on 22 September 1926 in Dzulunitsa, Veliko Tarnovo Province, Bulgaria.

=== Early life ===
After she graduated high school in Gorna Oryahovitsa, she continued her education as a medical nurse in Varna. During her studies in university, she joined the Aeroclub in Varna and started taking courses in parachuting and swimming. She became the first gymnastics coach in her native village.

In 1948, she took her AeroClub exam in Graf Ignatievo and received her flying certification.

=== Military education ===
After graduating, in 1949, she entered as a cadet at NVVU "G. Benkovski" in Pleven. She graduated in 1950 and was promoted to the rank of lieutenant. After completing an instructor course, she remained there as an instructor, and for two years she trained the cadets for their second pilot exams.

In 1952, she was assigned to the Chaika airfield, Varna. As a military pilot, she piloted the seaplanes Arado-196 A-3 "Shark," Henkel-60 "Seal." Then the service took her to the military transport aviation regiment, where she flew the Po-2, Yak-12, Li-2 and the Mi-1 helicopter.

In 1970, Tsoncheva was reassigned to the civil aviation group of Bulgaria, where she flew small AN-14 planes.

=== Fatal flight ===
The Rhodope region had planned its own civil airport in the 1960s, and it was finally built in the early 1970s near the Kardzhali district "Gledka." The runway at the Kardzhali airport was mainly used by Mi-1, Mi-8 helicopters and the tiny An-14 transport aircraft, which made daily passenger flights between the capital and Kardzhali, flying in the morning to Sofia and then back in the evening.

In the early morning of 17 September 1971, a powerful cyclone struck the Balkan Peninsula with dark clouds and mountain fog. Tsoncheva piloted an An-14 from Kardzhali with four crew members and eight passengers on board. It was to be a visual flight Kardzhali - Asenovgrad - Pazardzhik - Vakarel - Sofia, but the path took the plane over fog near the Rila mountains. For that portion of the flight, Tsoncheva requested that a traffic police dispatcher in Sofia navigate the plane. At a crucial moment, however, the radar indicators for Tsoncheva's plane overlapped with that of a transiting Turkish plane at a higher altitude. The controller confused the two planes and mistakenly gave the wrong landing instructions to the An-14 while it was still over the mountains. When the mistake was eventually realized, an order was given to immediately rise to 1,000 meters but it was already too late. The plane crashed head-on into the rocks near Mount Sveti Duh in the Alinitsa area above the village of Mala Tsarkva near Samokov. Only one passenger, who was smoking a cigarette in the tail section, survived.

== Awards ==
Post-mortem, Siyka Tsoncheva was awarded the award of "Honorary citizen of municipality of Lyaskovets” for her contributions to Bulgarian military aviation.
