= Charlotte Möhring =

German aviator (1887–1970)

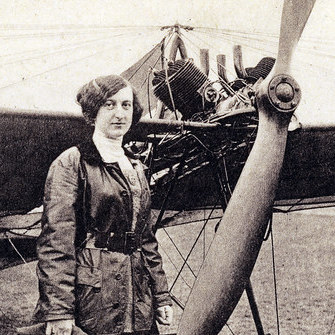
- Charlotte Möhring and engine
- Born: 31 March 1887; Pankow, German Empire
- Died: 19 October 1970 (aged 83); Berlin
- Known for: early aviator

Charlotte Möhring (born 31 March 1887 - died 19 October 1970 in Berlin) was a German aviator and the second German woman to receive a pilot's license.

== Life ==
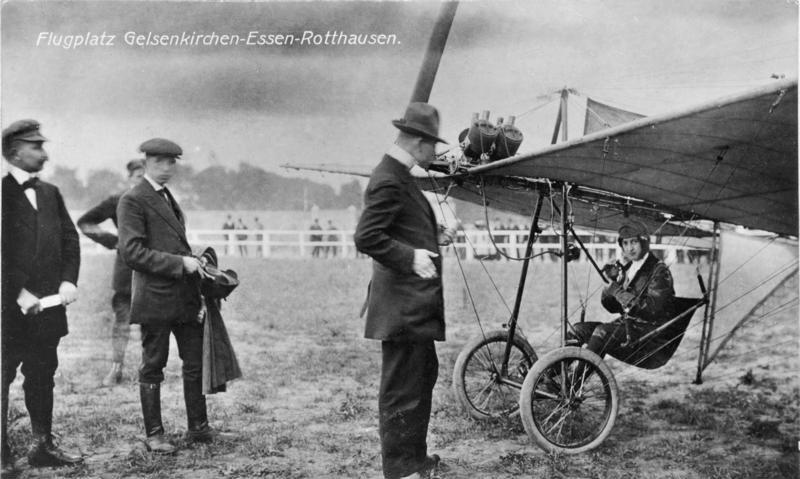
Charlotte Möhring with aircraft in 1912

She was born in Pankow in 1887.

Möhring was a passenger on a flight from Johannisthal to Döberitz on board a Rumpler Taube. On 7 September 1912 she received pilot's license #285 flying a Grade monoplane. She was the second German woman to be licensed (after Amelie Beese), and the third woman in Germany (after Beese and Božena Laglerová from Prague). She flew at the Essen-Gelsenkirchen-Rotthausen aerodrome.

Charlotte was married to Georg Mürau, who was also a pilot and instructor, they operated a flying school together in 1914. She was the manager and they toured and exhibited in 21 cities in Germany alone. During and after World War I civil aviation was restricted in Germany, Möhring did not resume her flying career which in 1953 she described as "a sport". She died in 1970 in Berlin.

== See also ==
- Women in aviation
