= S. Kumars =

Textile and apparel company

S. Kumars Nationwide Limited
- Type: Textile conglomerate
- Traded as: BSE: 514304; NSE: SKUMARSYNF
- Industry: Manufacturing and Trading of textiles & apparels
- Founded: 1990 as S.Kumars Synfabs Ltd. 6 October 2000 - name changed to S. Kumars Nationwide Ltd. (SKNL)
- Founders: Late Seth Shri Shankarlalji Surajmalji Kasliwal; Late Sethani Smt. Chandrawatiji Shankarlalji Kasliwal
- Headquarters: Mumbai, India
- Key people: Nitin Kasliwal (Chairman & MD)
- Website: sknl.co.in

S. Kumars Nationwide Limited or SKNL is a textile and apparel company with expertise in multi-fibre manufacturing presently under liquidation. The company has extended its presence in multiple product categories from fabrics to apparels and home textiles.

== History ==
The S. Kumars Group floated a deemed public company on 28 February 1991 and a public company on 7 July 1992.

The name of the Public Company was S. Kumars SYNFABS LTD and later the name was changed to S. Kumars Nationwide Limited (SKNL) in October 2000.

== Brands and subsidiaries ==
=== Textiles and apparel ===
SKNL has set up a texturising and twisting plant at Dewas in Madhya Pradesh. In 1997, SKNL acquired a spinning-cum-weaving unit near Dewas (Madhya Pradesh), from Standard Industries Limited.

In 1998, SKNL entered into a collaboration with Reid & Taylor of Scotland for manufacturing and marketing the Reid & Taylor worsted suiting in India. In 2006, SKNL launched "Carmichael House", a complete range of home linen products and accessories.

In 2006, SKNL launched "Belmonte", a youth menswear brand that had both fabric and ready-to-wear garments under one label.

In 2007, the clothing brand Stephens Brothers was licensed to SKNL in India. It was launched in December 2007, to introduce the English cut & style to Indian consumer. The brand is now owned by the UK Group Austin Reed.

In 2008 SKNL acquired assets of Legguino s.p.a. Italy, manufacturer and seller of high value fine cotton shirting supplying to fashion houses of Europe and U.S.A. This provides front-end back-end synergy for SKNL’s Baruche Superfine Cottons plant.

Subsequently SKNL entered into a joint venture and licensing agreement with Donna Karan International to manufacture / sell DKNY menswear. The agreement was terminated in 2012.

In 2009, SKNL has acquired assets of Hartmarx Corporation, a well-known suits manufacturing company in American and European markets.

== Organization ==
SKNL businesses are divided into product-specific Strategic Business Units (SBUs): Consumer Textiles, Home Textiles, Worsted Suitings, Ready to Wear and High Value Fine Cotton (HVFC). Each of these SBUs is headed by an Executive Director, Chief Executive Officer or a Chief Operating Officer. The corporate activities related to finance, planning, research, publicity, marketing, human resources etc. are centralized.

Consumer Textiles

- Belmonte (Fabrics)
- Uniformity by Belmonte (Uniform fabric)
- S.Kumars (Work wear fabric)

Home Textiles

- Carmichael House (Premium)
- Benetton ( Super Premium)

Ready to Wear (TWS)

- Belmonte (Mid-Premium)

Baruche Superfine Cottons

== Reid & Taylor (India) Limited ==
S. Kumars acquired rights for manufacturing and marketing the Reid & Taylor worsted suiting in India in 1998. Reid & Taylor was originally started by a Scottish man named Alexander Reid in the 1830s. The concern, financed by Joseph Taylor, went on to become a notable worsted suiting brand. S. Kumars set up a luxury suiting plant at Mysore in 1998 for Reid & Taylor (India) Ltd. The brand has been endorsed by India's notable film actor, Amitabh Bachchan. In 2008, 24.5% stake in Reid & Taylor was acquired by an affiliate of GIC Special Investments for ₹900 crores.

Luxury Textiles

- Reid & Taylor (Luxury Suitings)

Luxury Textiles

- Reid & Taylor (Luxury Suitings)

Ready to Wear

- Reid & Taylor ( Premium)
