= Lewis Yancey =

American aviator (1895–1940)

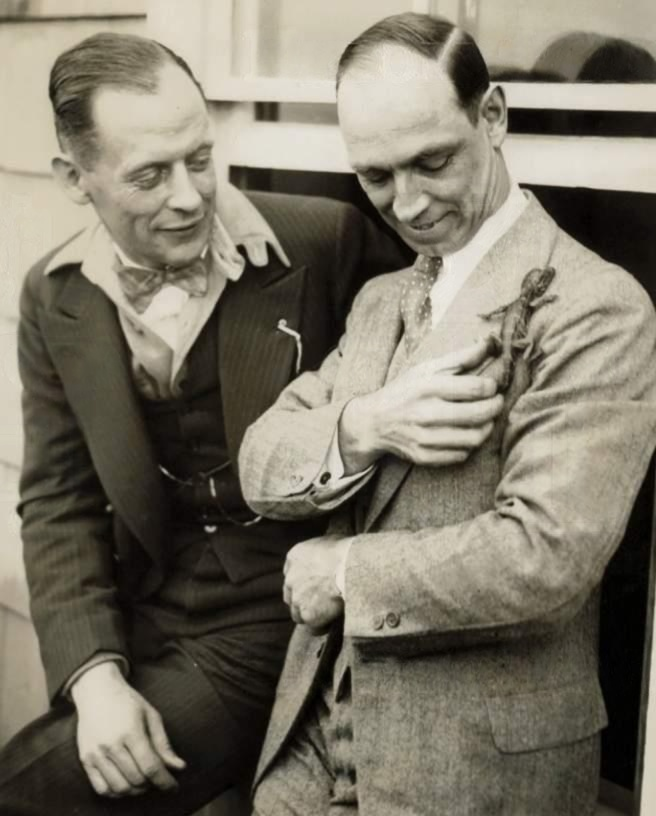
Yancey (left) and Roger Q. Williams in 1929

Captain Lewis Alonzo Yancey (September 16, 1895 – March 2, 1940) was an American aviator and air navigator who toured America, Central America, and the Caribbean in a Pitcairn autogyro.

== Biography ==
Born in Chicago, Yancey enlisted in the United States Navy in 1911 and was made a lieutenant during World War I. He left the Navy in 1921 and became a ship's officer for the Isthmian Steamship Company. With continued study, he achieved master mariner status and the title of Captain.

Yancey joined the United States Coast Guard in April 1925 and became interested in aviation and the science of navigation then. His knowledge of air navigation put him in demand with pilots in the late 1920s and early 1930s. In 1927, he made his first transcontinental flight as co-pilot.

== History-making flights ==
In 1929, Yancey and Roger Q. Williams made their historic flight from Old Orchard Beach, Maine to Rome. En route, their Bellanca monoplane "The Pathfinder", hit fog and was forced to fly blind for most of their first day. However, due to Yancey's navigational calculations, once able to see their way, the team found themselves still exactly on course. Their one emergency stop, in Santander, Spain, occurred thirty-one hours and thirty minutes into the flight. Upon arriving in Rome, Yancey and Williams were met with crowds "almost as fervent" as those greeting Lindbergh in Paris.

In 1930, Yancey, William H. Alexander, and Zeh Bouck made the first-ever flight from New York to Bermuda in a Stinson monoplane equipped with pontoons. Forced down, the plane spent the night at sea but was able to take off again under its own power the next morning; the first plane ever to do so. The crew made the flight in about eight and a half hours of flying time.

In 1938, Yancey flew with Richard Archbold to New Guinea for the American Museum of Natural History.

== Death, tributes, and legacy ==
Yancey died unexpectedly of a cerebral hemorrhage at his home in Yonkers, New York. He was 44.

In his lifetime, Yancey received decorations from Albert I of Belgium, Pope Pius XI, Victor Emmanuel III of Italy and Benito Mussolini. From the U.S. Navy, Yancey received a medal for his work on meteorology during World War I.

Yancey was the author of several books on aviation including Aerial Navigation and Meteorology (1929). He frequently contributed stories about his flights to The New York Times, once sending a story via radio from 3,500 feet in the air. Yancey advocated making radio communication a regular function of flying. He advised that a radio operator be part of a flight crew so the pilot would not have to divide his attention while flying.

Considered a celebrity for his accomplishments, in New York City Yancey's likeness was captured in caricature for Sardi's, the theater district restaurant. The picture is now part of the collection of the New York Public Library.

Yancey is buried in Arlington National Cemetery.

== See also ==
- 1932 in aviation
- List of caricatures at Sardi's restaurant
