= Hans Grade =

German aviation pioneer

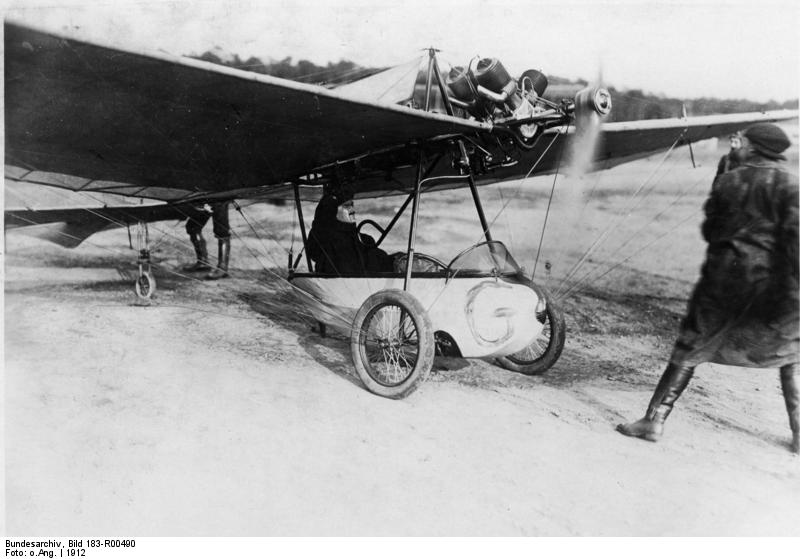
Hans Grade before takeoff 1912.

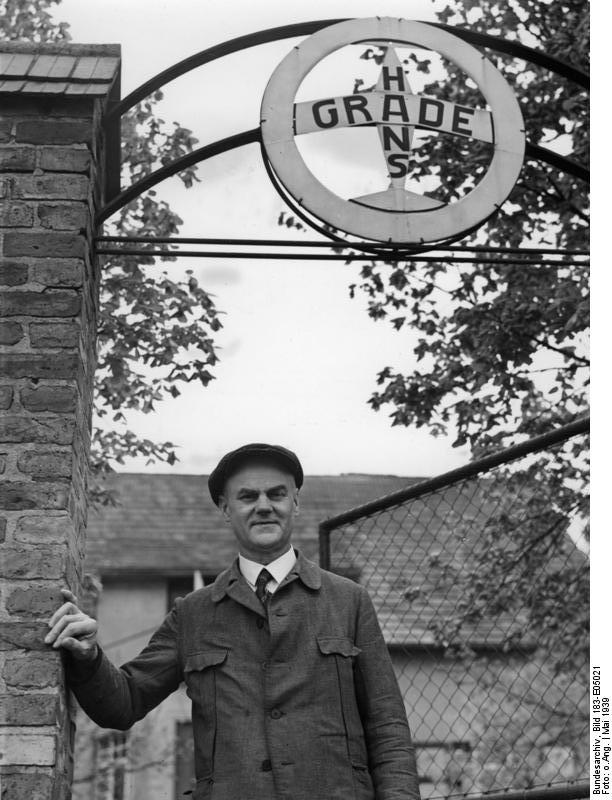
Grade at his house in 1939.

Hans Grade (May 17, 1879 – October 22, 1946) was a German aviation pioneer.

Hans Grade was born in Köslin, Pomerania. On 28 October 1908 he successfully conducted the first motor-flight over German soil in a motorised triplane aircraft of his own construction at Magdeburg.

A year later, on 30 October 1909, flying a new monoplane design he won the 40.000 Reichsmark "Lanz-Preis der Lufte", for the first German to fly a flat "8" in a German aircraft with German engine around two pylons 1000 meters apart.

In 1910 he established the first aviation school in Germany.

A Grade monoplane carried Germany's first air mail, when pilot Pentz made a flight from Bork to Bruck in February 1912 with a small sack of mail in his lap. Although successful, Grade monoplanes did not become as famous as many contemporary European designs, and for this reason comparatively few were built.

In 1921 he established an automobile company called "Grade Automobilwerke AG", which produced small, 2 seater personal cars.

The small aircraft company, founded with this money, did not survived the Treaty of Versailles of 1919. His extraordinary construction of driving a car with no use of a gear-box did not stand against the established constructions.

The Grade Automobilwerke AG was closed in 1927 owing to financial difficulties. After the Nazi takeover in 1933 Grade tried, without success, to develop a new Volksflugzeug and in 1934 he undertook research projects for the German aircraft manufacturers.

On May 14, 1939, he re-flew his original monoplane from 1909, then 30 years old, at Berlin Tempelhof Airport for about 550 metres to celebrate his sixtieth birthday.

Hans Grade died in 1946 at the age of 67 in Borkheide.
