= Douglas Warren =

Canadian air force pilot and commander

- Born: 28 May 1922; Nanton, Alberta, Canada
- Died: 28 August 2011 (aged 89); Comox, British Columbia
- Military career
- Allegiance: Canada
- Branch: Royal Canadian Air Force
- Service years: 1940–1973
- Rank: Lieutenant-Colonel
- Nickname: Duke (shared with brother Bruce)
- Commands: 421 Squadron, RCAF Station Baldy Hughes, Air Cadet Camp in Penhold, Alberta
- Conflicts: World War II: Dieppe Raid; Korean War
- Awards: Distinguished Flying Cross
- Other work: Aviation consultant

Douglas (Duke) Warren, (May 28, 1922 – August 27, 2011) was a Canadian air force pilot and commander. He shared the nickname "Duke" with his identical twin brother, Bruce (Duke) Warren, who died in 1951. Douglas was known for participating as a pilot in the Dieppe Raid in World War II, and won the Distinguished Flying Cross in 1945. Doug's memoirs, titled "Gemini Flight" chronicled his and his brother's flying experiences.

== Biography and early flying career ==
Douglas and his identical twin, Bruce, were born in Nanton, Alberta on May 28, 1922. Both were called by the nickname, "Duke". In 1940 they joined the Royal Canadian Air Force and went overseas in 1942. They both flew two tours of operations in Britain during World War II with Royal Air Force spitfire squadrons. In 1945 they both were awarded Distinguished Flying Cross by King George VI at Buckingham Palace.

In 1942, Duke flew during the Dieppe Raid, the biggest single day air-operation of the war. He is credited with 1/2 a kill on his three Dieppe sorties, a Dornier 217. Of it he said, "I remember watching the crew bail out.".

On their return to Canada, Douglas became a Flight Commander with 421 Squadron flying DH Vampire jet aircraft at Chatham, New Brunswick. On April 5, 1951, his brother Bruce was killed as a test pilot at AV Roe aircraft company in Toronto flying the prototype CF100.

== Post-World War II flying career ==
Douglas became commanding officer of 410 F86 Sabre Squadron at RAF North Luffenham, England in 1952. During that time he flew with the United States Air Force during the war in Korea. In 1956 he became chief flying instructor at Chatham, NB.

In 1957, he was given a three-year assignment as chief flying instructor with the German Luftwaffe in Oldenburg. In 1961 he joined the Flight Safety Directorate at RCAF headquarters in Ottawa. He became commanding officer in 1965 to RCAF Station Baldy Hughes near Prince George, BC for two years. This was followed by three years at NORAD headquarters in Colorado Springs. In 1970 he accepted a final posting to CFB Comox as operations officer and retired in 1973.

== See also ==
- Comox Air Force Museum
