= Roger Q. Williams =

American aviator

Roger Quincy Williams
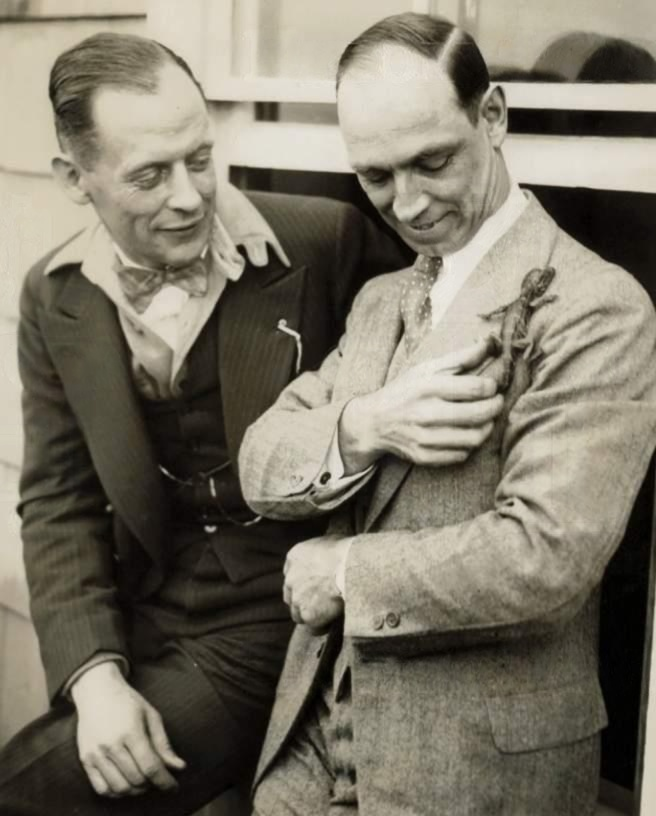
- Williams (right) and Lewis Yancey in 1929
- Born: April 30, 1894; Brooklyn, New York, US
- Died: August 12, 1976 (aged 82); Alameda, California, US

Roger Quincy Williams (April 30, 1894 - August 12, 1976) was an American aviator. He established The Roger Q. Williams School of Aeronautics. He designed the Yankee Aerocoupe.

== Biography ==
He was born in Brooklyn, New York on April 30, 1894.

In July 1929 Williams, with Lewis Yancey, broke the over-water flying record by making a non-stop flight from Old Orchard Beach, Maine to Santander, Spain. The 3,400 mile flight took 31 hours and 30 minutes. After minor repairs in Spain, the Bellanca monoplane continued on to Rome.

In 1937 he filed for bankruptcy.

During World War I, Williams served with the United States Army Air Corps. Between 1942 and 1946 Williams served with the United States Army Air Forces. Williams wrote Flying to the Moon and Halfway Back in 1949.

In 1971, Williams received a National Aviation Hall of Fame award from the OX-5 Club.

Williams died in Alameda, California on August 12, 1976.
