= Society Brand Clothes =

- Type: Private
- Industry: Consumer Goods
- Founded: 1902 as Alfred Decker & Cohn
- Defunct: 1952
- Headquarters: Chicago, Illinois
- Area served: United States
- Key people: Alfred Decker (Chairman of the Board) (President)
- Products: Men's clothing
- Number of employees: 2,200 (1930)

Society Brand Clothes (originally and formally Alfred Decker & Cohn) was a leading manufacturer of men's suits, based in Chicago. The company was founded in 1902 by Alfred Decker and Abraham Cohn. The company incorporated in 1919. It was known for its Society Brand line of suits and came to do business under the name Society Brand Clothes.

After 1913, the company was located in the Alfred Decker & Cohn Building (subsequently known as the Society Brand Building) at 416 South Franklin Street in Chicago. The building was built in 1912–1913 by Graham, Anderson, Probst and White.

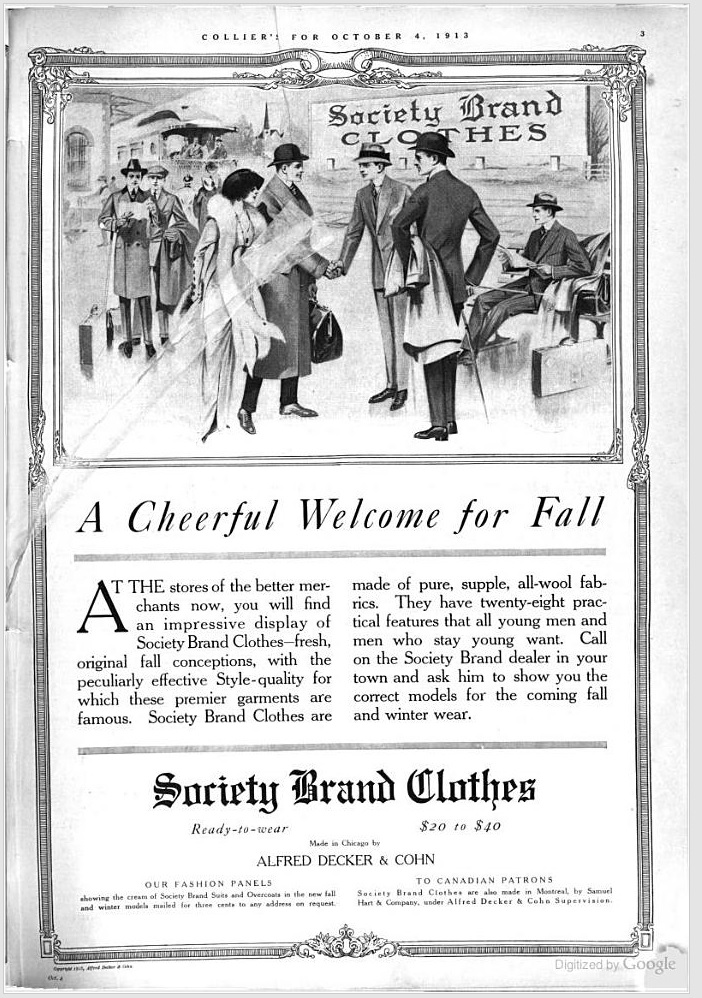
Society Brand Clothes Colliers advertisement from October 4, 1913

The company advertised Society Brand extensively in posters, magazines and newspapers under the slogan For Young Men and Men who Stay Young.

In 1919, the company started delivering some of its merchandise to retailers outside of Chicago via two dedicated Curtiss Jenny airplanes that had the name "Society Brand Clothes" painted prominently on the fuselage. Service included nearby cities in Illinois, Indiana, and Wisconsin. Operations ceased in 1920.

Society Brand Clothes was acquired by Hartmarx in 1952. Hartmarx continued the Society Brand line for at least 30 years.
