= John Emmet Sheridan =

American illustrator

- Born: June 14, 1877; Tomah, Wisconsin
- Died: July 3, 1948 (aged 71); Roosevelt Hospital; Manhattan, New York City
- Education: Georgetown University

John Emmet Sheridan (June 14, 1877 – July 3, 1948) was an illustrator well known in his lifetime for his cover art for The Saturday Evening Post, his illustrations for Collier's Weekly and Ladies' Home Journal, and his commercial advertisements. He is "credited with the idea of using posters to advertise college sports." Sheridan was a member of the Dutch Treat Club, and a frequent contributor to the program of their annual banquet and show, and was an instructor at New York's School of Visual Arts at the time of its founding.

== Biography ==
He was born on June 14, 1877, in Tomah, Wisconsin.

Sheridan attended Georgetown University graduating in 1901.

During World War I, he created many patriotic posters in support of the United States' war effort as part of the committee of artists that also included Charles Dana Gibson (creator of the Gibson Girl) and James Montgomery Flagg (creator of the iconic Uncle Sam recruiting poster).

Sheridan was art editor for the Washington Times (predecessor of the now-defunct Washington Times-Herald) and worked for the San Francisco Chronicle in the development of its first color Sunday supplement. Between 1931 and 1939 he produced 13 cover illustrations for The Saturday Evening Post.

He died on July 3, 1948, at Roosevelt Hospital in Manhattan, New York City.

== Signatures and monograms ==
As an artist of advertisements and magazine covers, Sheridan was not always free to sign his full name to his art work. As a result, many of his illustrations contain only stylized monograms to identify the artist.

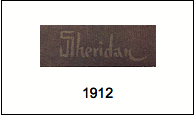
Signature with an initial JS Monogram (Sometimes incorrectly interpreted as "Theridan")

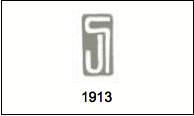
Simple JS Monogram

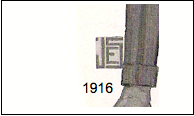
Box JES Monogram

Color image of JS Monogram

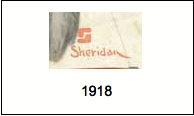
Block JS Monogram

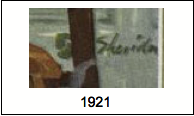
Monogram and Last Name

== Work ==
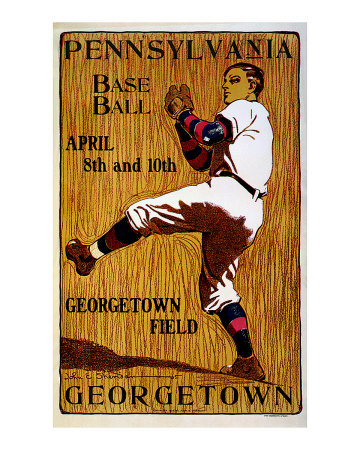
Poster for University of Pennsylvania vs Georgetown University baseball game, circa 1901

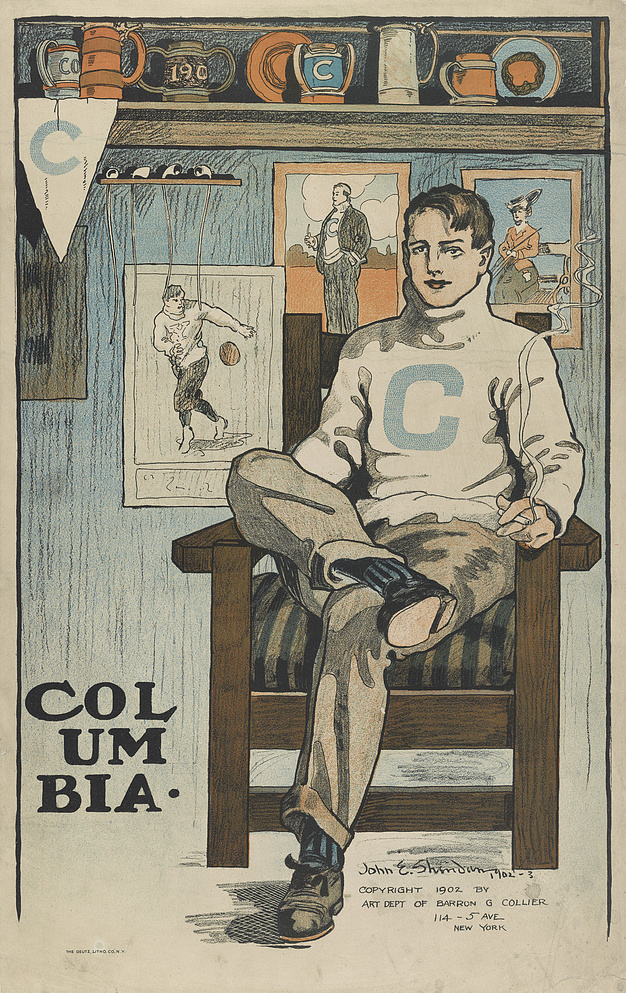
Poster for Columbia University, 1902

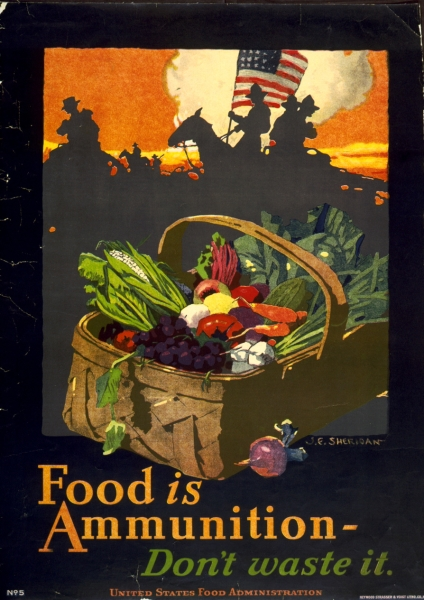
Food is Ammunition, Don't waste it. (For World War I / US Food Administration), 1918

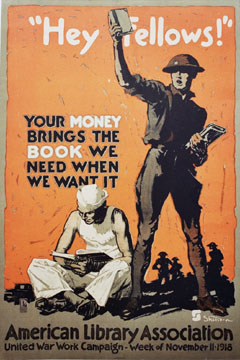
World War I Book drive for American Library Association c.1918

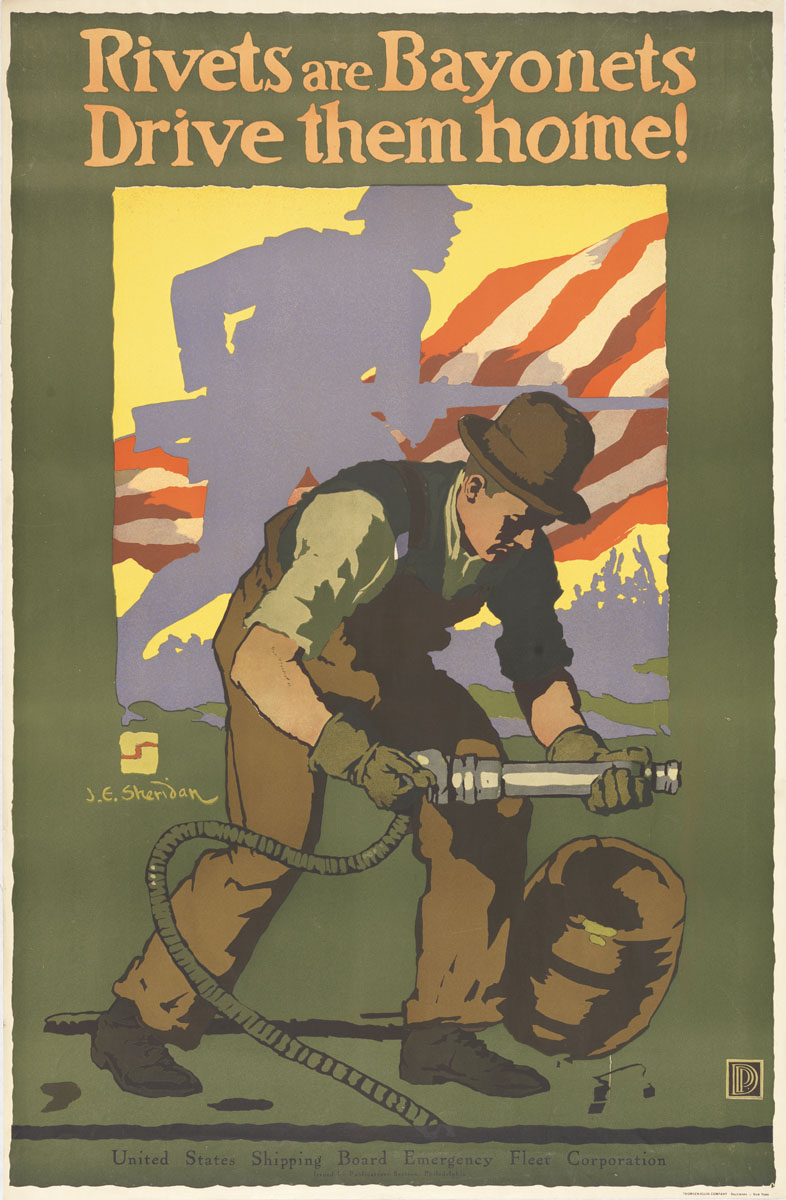
World War I War production (shipbuilding) c.1918

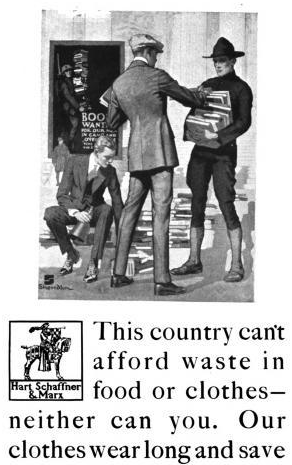
World War I Advertisement for Hart, Shaffner and Marx, 1919

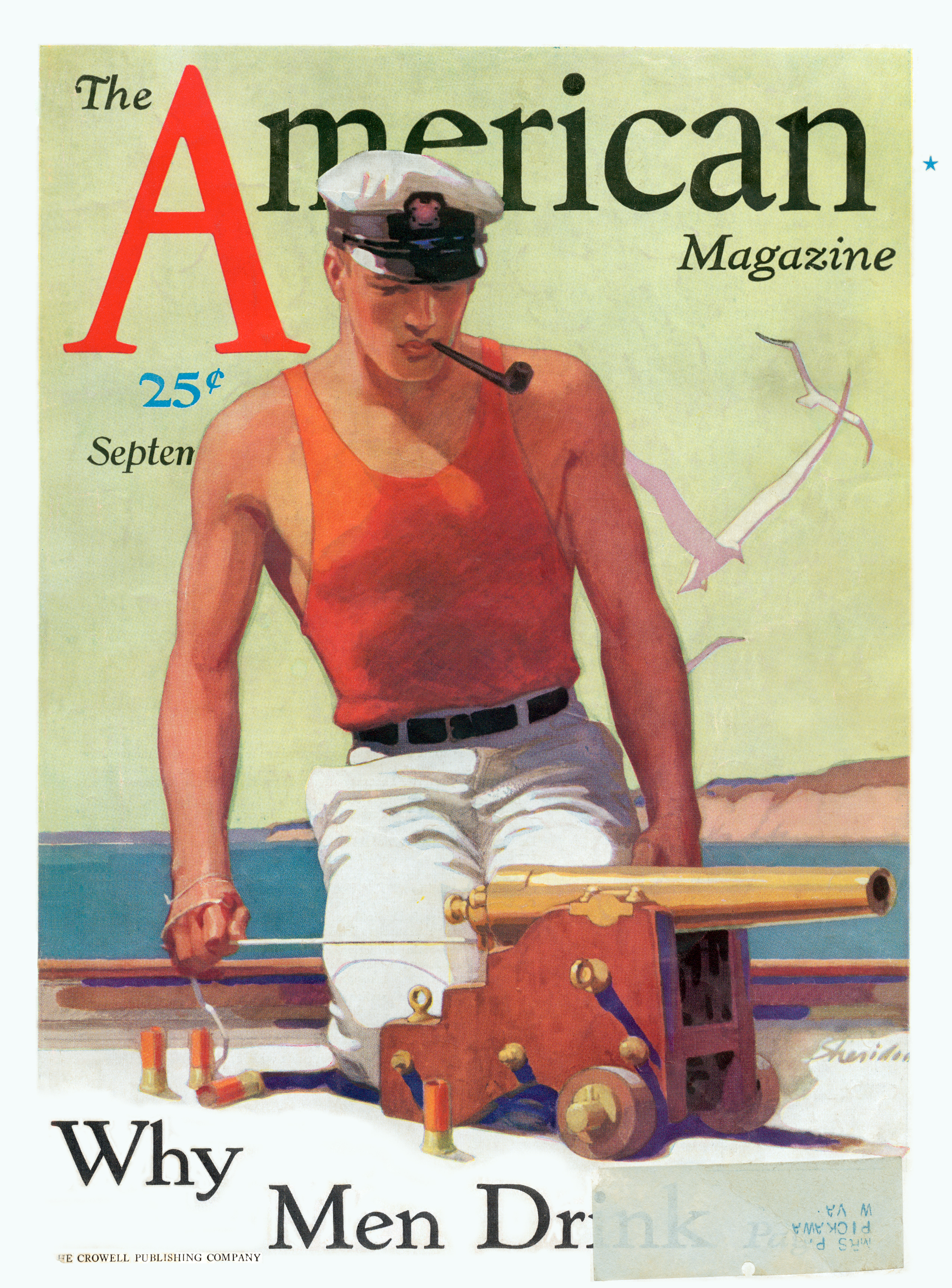
Illustration of Joseph Cotten for The American Magazine, 1931
