= Gaby Angelini =

Gabriella (Gaby) Angelini
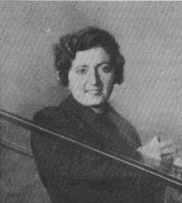
- Born: 1911; Milan, Italy
- Died: December 3, 1932 (aged 20–21); Libya
- Occupation: Aviator
- Notable work: First Italian woman to complete a trans-European flight

Gabriella (Gaby) Angelini (1911 - 3 December 1932) was an Italian aviator.

== Early life and education ==
Angelini was born in Milan to a wealthy family. She earned her pilot's license at the age of 19, and quickly became a popular figure in Italy.

== Flying career ==
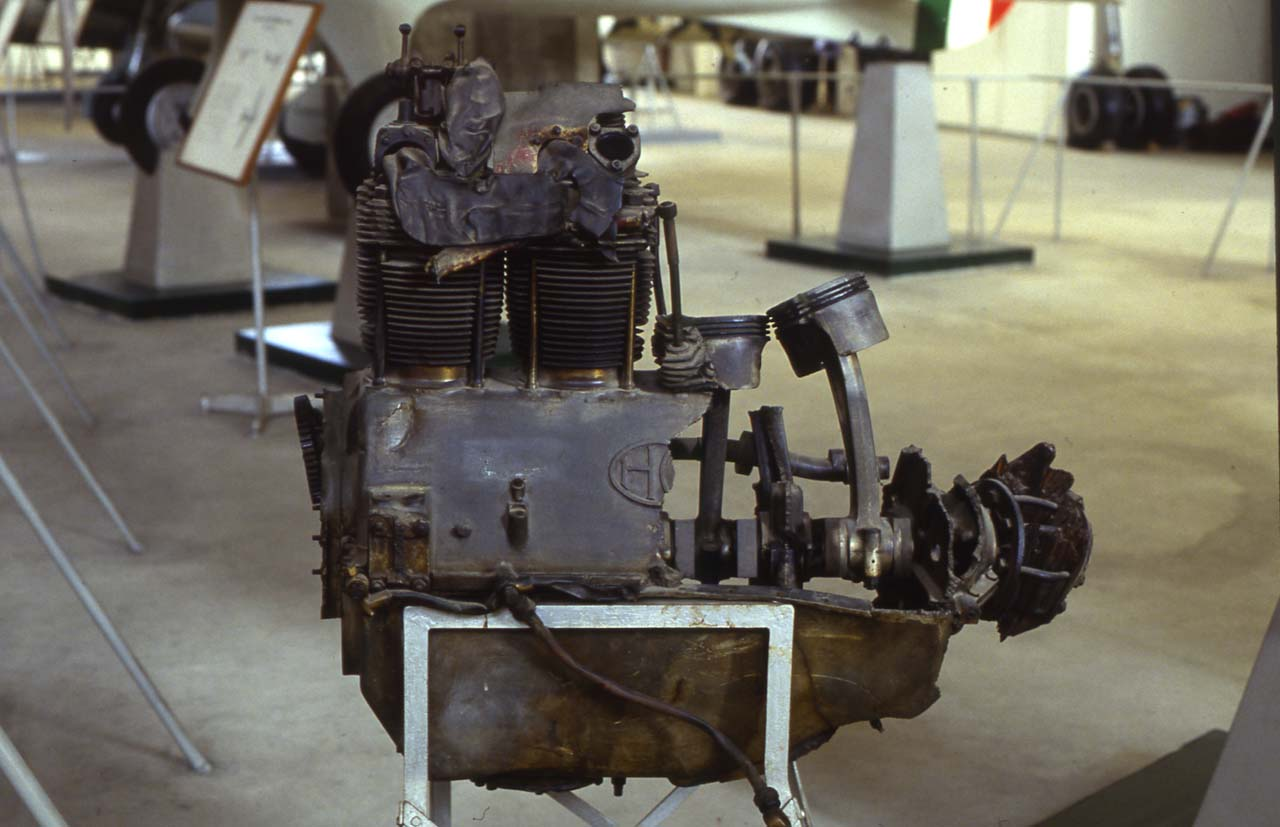
Air-cooled, inline 4-cylinder engine believed to have been mounted on the Breda Ba.15 aeroplane in which Gaby Angelini crashed in the Libyan desert on 3 December 1932

Angelini was the first Italian woman to complete a trans-European flight, travelling to eight European countries, for which she received a Golden Eagle Medal. In 1932 she left Italy on a solo flight to Delhi, India, travelling in a Breda Ba.15 aeroplane. Angelini encountered difficulties during a sandstorm in Libya en route, and crashed in the desert and died. More than 120,000 people attended her funeral in Milan.

== Legacy ==
In 2014, a book by Rosellina Piano was published about Angelini's life, titled La Leggenda di Little Gaby (The Legend of Little Gaby).
