= Giribala Mohanty =

Indian aviator

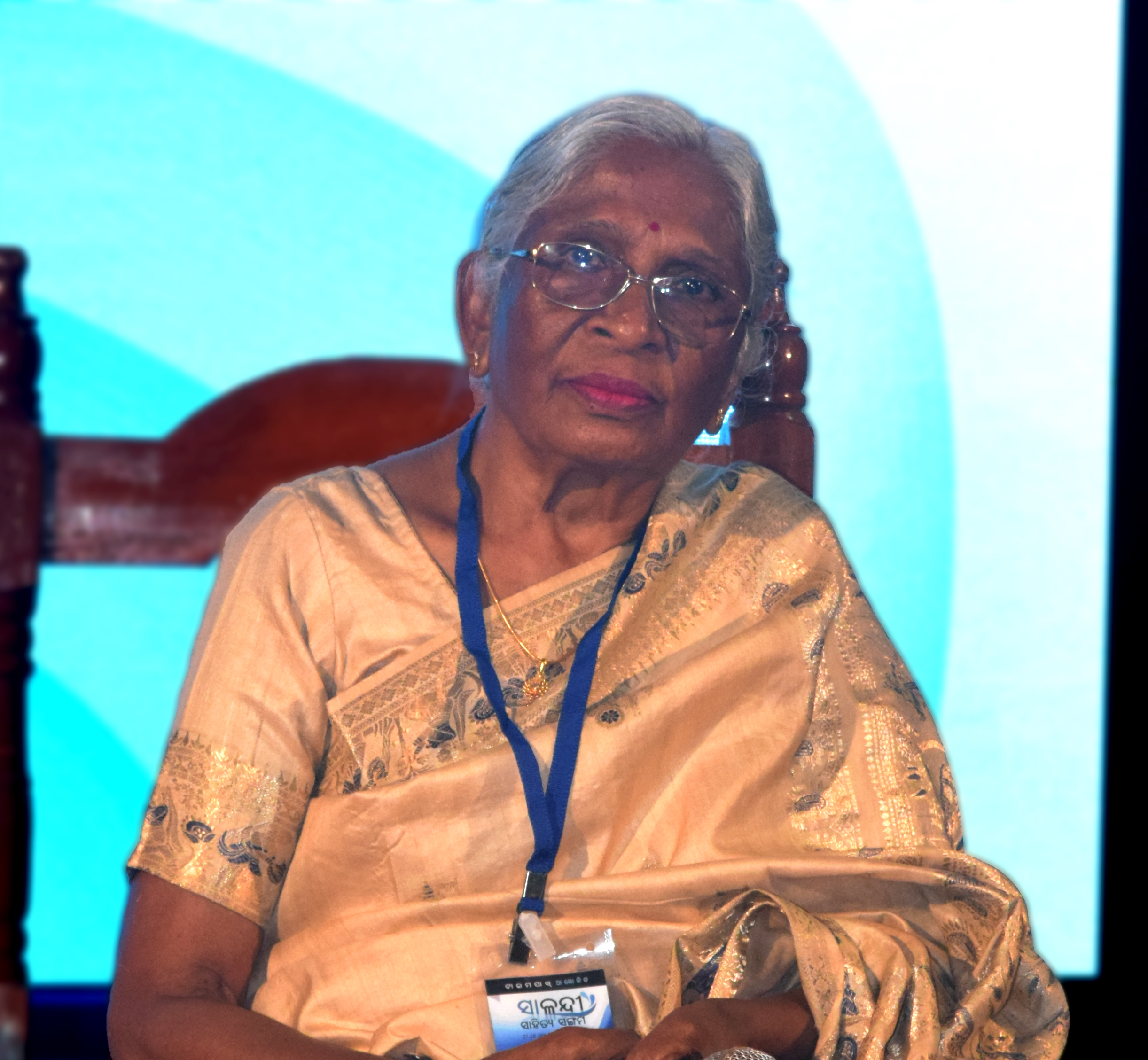
- Born: Bhubaneswar, Odisha

Giribala Mohanty is an Indian aviator. She was the first female aviator from Odisha, and the first to have a license to fly a private aircraft. She was invited to join the other female aviators in 1967 Convention organised by the Ninety-Nine Inc., the International Women Pilots Association at Washington, D.C. There she joined the other female aviators in a conducted flying tour of the United States.
