= Keith Rosenkranz =

Keith Rosenkranz is a retired American fighter pilot and author. As a captain in the United States Air Force, he flew 30 missions in an F-16 Fighting Falcon during the Persian Gulf War. He later wrote a book about his experiences in the war, titled Vipers in the Storm: Diary of a Gulf War Fighter Pilot, which included a foreword from Vice President Dick Cheney. Rosenkranz was interviewed twice by CNN prior to the Iraq War. After nearly nine years, he left the military in June 1991 and became a longtime Delta Air Lines pilot, retiring in 2024. Captain Keith Rosenkranz celebrated his retirement with a special gesture — he chartered a Delta Airbus A330neo to fly 112 friends and family to Kona, Hawaii. In 2003 he wrote an article for the New York Times about the Tarnak Farm incident and has been quoted in newspapers regarding other aerial accidents.

== Bibliography ==
- Rosenkranz, Keith (April 24, 2002). Vipers in the Storm: Diary of a Gulf War Fighter Pilot. McGraw Hill Professional. ISBN 978-0-07-140040-4.
