= Gledka =

Coordinates: 41.7667°N 25.6500°E

- Village
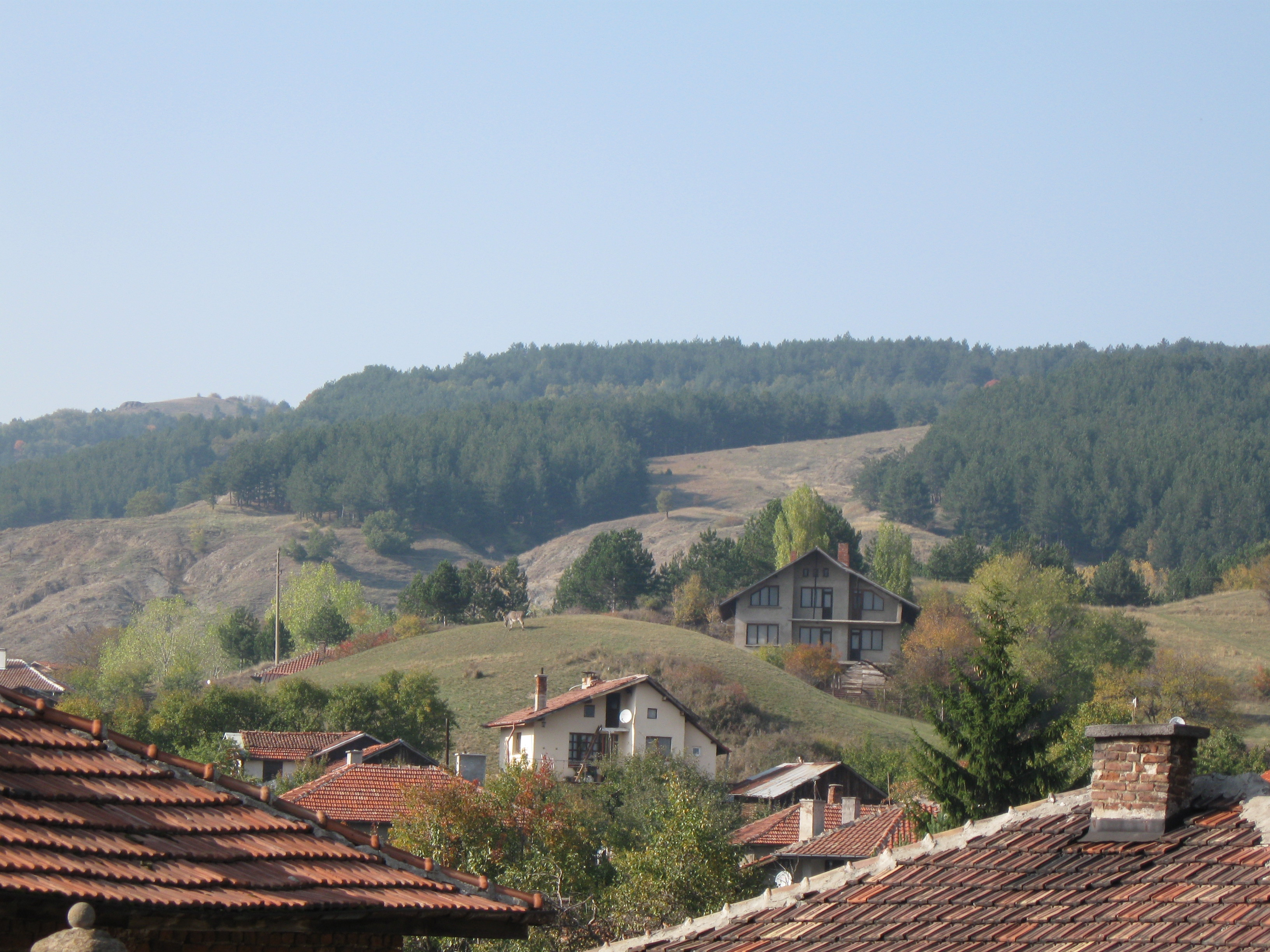
- Gledka village in Bulgaria
- Country: Bulgaria
- Province: Haskovo Province
- Municipality: Stambolovo
- Time zone: UTC+2 (EET)
  - Summer (DST): UTC+3 (EEST)

Gledka is a village in Stambolovo Municipality, in Haskovo Province, in southern Bulgaria.
