= Olasubomi Iginla Aina =

Nigerian-United Kingdom human rights defender

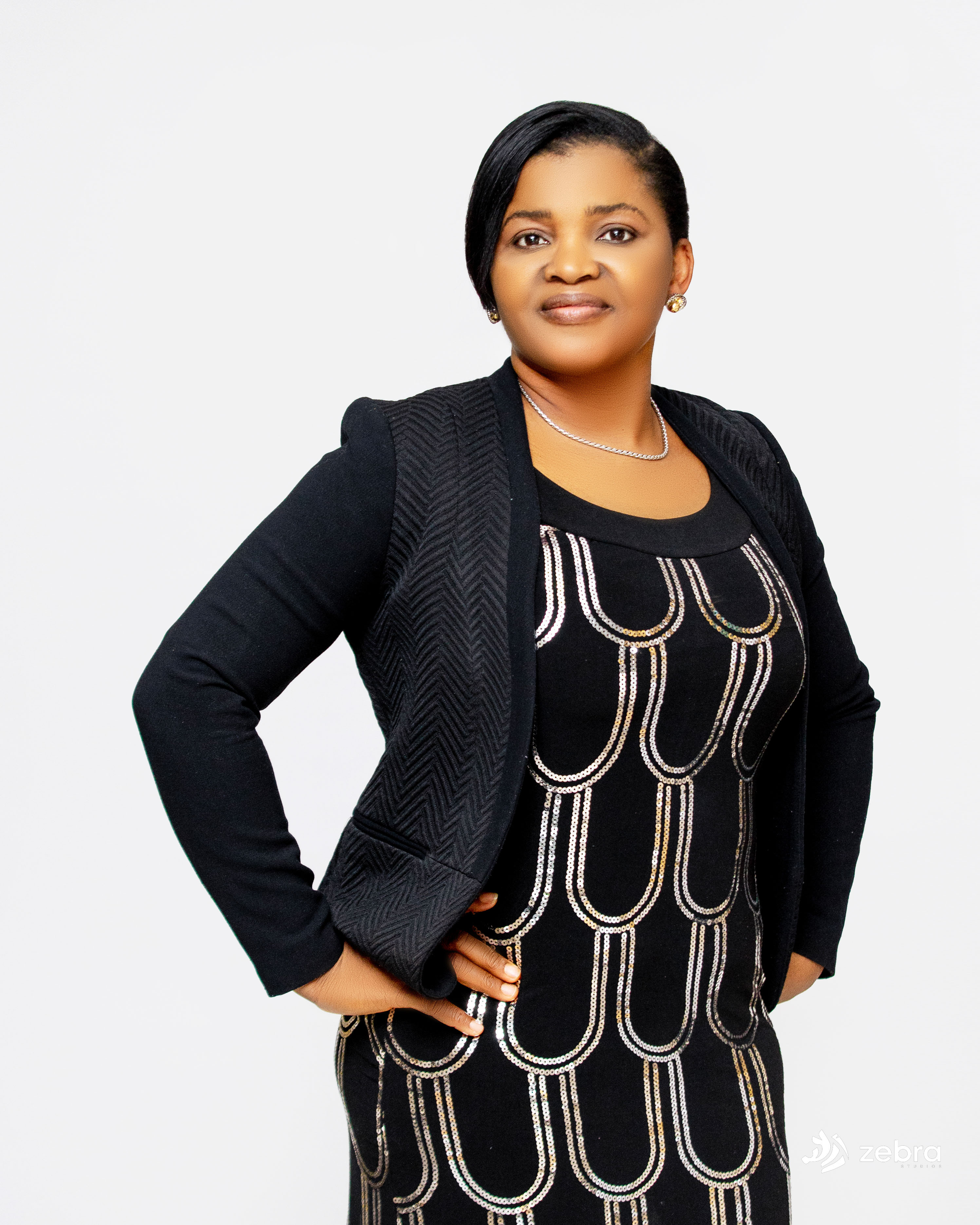
- Born: Olasubomi; January 17, 1978 (age 48); Lagos, Nigeria
- Education: B.Sc Architecture Obafemi Awolowo University LLM Brighton University Generative Leadership Course Oxford University
- Occupations: Social Entrepreneur; Human Right Activist; Architect
- Known for: Youth Rights Advocacy
- Spouse: Dr Olufemi Adebola Aina
- Website: https://olasubomiiginla.com/

Olasubomi Iginla Aina MBE (born 1978) is a Nigerian-British humanitarian pundit and advocate for the rights of youth, disadvantaged communities, and people of color. As the founder of the Lightup Foundation, Olasubomi has gained recognition for her efforts to address socio-economic factors that drive migration, empower vulnerable populations, and promote issues such as education, healthcare access, and youth development.

== Early life and education ==
Olasubomi was born in 1978 in Nigeria. She attended Yewande Memorial Nursery and Primary School in her early years before moving on to Lagos Anglican Girls Grammar School, where she completed her secondary education. At Lagos Anglican, she demonstrated leadership skills, serving as head girl. During her time at the school, she was involved in various humanitarian initiatives and youth empowerment projects, contributing to the local community and earning the school recognition for her efforts.

In 1996, Olasubomi enrolled at Obafemi Awolowo University in Ile-Ife, where she pursued a degree in Architecture. While at the university, she became involved in student leadership and advocacy. She served as Vice President of the Students' Union and later became president, in 1999–2000, representing students. OAU experienced a period of crisis, marked by protests over the rustication of students, including some members of the Students' Union leadership. The protests escalated, and the Nigerian government intervened, leading to the removal of the Vice Chancellor.

As Students' Union President, Olasubomi played a role in navigating the crisis. She organized a peaceful protest that was later referenced in Professor Rogers Makanjuola's book Water Must Flow Uphill (pages 187–188). After completing her degree in architecture, Olasubomi pursued further studies in law in 2018 at the University of Brighton and Generative Leadership course at Oxford University and received specialized trainings in Social Enterprise in 2015.

== Activism ==
=== Advocacy for migrants ===
She initiated and supported various projects, including evacuating Ukrainian orphans from conflict zones during the Russia-Ukraine war. In 2022, she traveled to Ukraine to ensure the safety of vulnerable children. She also conducted a solidarity/humanitarian tour in Hungary, Poland, Slovakia, Germany, and Romania to support refugees of color fleeing the Ukraine conflict. In 2022, Olasubomi acknowledged the work of Helena Maleno, a human rights activist, by presenting her with an award of Honour in Barcelona in recognition of Maleno's efforts in rescuing migrants at sea through her organization, Walking Borders.

In 2024, at the UN Nairobi Conference, she organized six side events through the Lightup Foundation, which raised awareness about the risks of irregular migration, particularly between African and European countries. In 2022, she responded to the tragic deaths' migrants during a border clash between Spain and Morocco by advocating for better protection of young migrants. She was also invited to witness the securing of a new agreement between the Catalonia government and UNICEF to safeguard young immigrants.

=== Student advocacy and humanitarian outreach ===
Olasubomi has been a vocal advocate for African students residing in Northern Cyprus, addressing issues such as poor healthcare and social justice. She also played a role in lifting financial restrictions on Nigerian students, and proposed policy changes that alleviated their financial burdens. In response to the Central Bank of Nigeria's (CBN) restrictive money transfer policies, she moved the matter to the Nigerian government and engaged in media advocacy to promote policy change in 2022. Today, the CBN policy no longer exists, alleviating financial burdens for students.Olasubomi advocated for students on scholarship from Zamfara State, Nigeria, who were at risk of expulsion from Cyprus International University (CIU) due to a government funding default. In collaboration with National Association of Nigerian students, her efforts led to the government resuming payments, allowing some students to graduate in 2024. Olasubomi's humanitarian efforts have extended beyond Europe and Africa. One of operation was in 2005, during a severe drought in Niger, she conducted a food rescue operation funded by her personal resources.

=== Diplomatic and leadership roles ===
In 2019, Olasubomi was appointed as an Ambassador for the State of the African Diaspora (SOAD), the 6th Region of African, where she served for three years without compensation. SOAD, launched during the Summit of the African Union, focused on promoting unity and empowerment among the African diasporas. In 2022, she was appointed Minister of Youth and Development for SOAD, continuing her advocacy for youth development and collaborating with governments and organizations such as the UN. In 2021, Olasubomi contributed research to the UK Foreign Affairs Select Committee, focusing on issues related to Global Britain and the Nigeria-UK relationship. Her work helped inform the Integrated Review of the Foreign, Commonwealth, and Development Office's priorities for Nigeria. She also facilitated a meeting between the Committee and UK-based Nigerians, offering them a platform to raise their concerns. From 2019 to 2023, she served as plenipotentiary with 2 Ambassadorial roles; Diaspora Ambassador for Nigeria and Nigerian National Assembly Ambassador to the United Kingdom during the same period.

In 2021, Olasubomi was elected as one of the 18 Directors of the Global NGO Executive Committee (GNEC) – liaising for global NGO to the UNDGC, a position she secured through a global election. As Chair of the GNEC Communications Committee and Editor-in-Chief of the GNEC-NGO Reporter, she revitalized the publication. She was re-elected as a GNEC Director in 2024, continuing her role in the organization. Olasubomi has been involved with the United Nations (UN), receiving invitations to speak at various events. In 2024, she was appointed as one of the eight members of the UN Civil Society Task Force, a group responsible for selecting the two main Conference Co-chairs and all the Committee Co-chairs for the entire conference. Following this role, she was appointed as co-chair of the Outreach (Youth) Sub-committee at the 2024 UN Civil Society Nairobi Conference, the first such conference held in Africa.

=== Empowerment and advocacy projects ===
In 2015, Olasubomi launched the Bag of Hope project, a global initiative that raised awareness about child rights through creative expression. The project, which included the Guinness world's largest canvas bag in 2015, toured multiple countries, serving as a symbol of hope and promoting the UN Convention on the Rights of the Child. The BOH project has visited Uganda, Nigeria, Scotland, Ghana, Togo, Benin Republic, France, and England. In 2018, Olasubomi founded the Lightup Nursery and Primary School in the Ikhare community, providing free education to children from Nigeria, Togo and Benin Republica region which has few educational resources. The school has since transformed the lives of the children residing within Ikhare community, helping them escape poverty and abuse.

In October 2023, Olasubomi launched the Creating Awareness and Alternative Mission (CAA Mission) to create global awareness and provide alternatives to irregular migration in selected African countries whose youths are susceptible to irregular migration. This initiative aims to empower youth through vocational training and education, focusing on sustainable development as a solution to the migration crisis. In 2014, Olasubomi initiated the Let's Talk Project, which has provided motivational sessions and counseling to secondary school students. By wearing a school uniform, she created a relaxed environment that encouraged young people to discuss the challenges they face.

== Recognition ==
Olasubomi has received accolades and formal recognition for her advocacy and humanitarian work. In 2019, she was appointed Member of the Most Excellent Order of the British Empire (MBE) for her contributions to supporting young people and disadvantaged communities, particularly in the UK and Nigeria. Olasubomi has also been invited to speak at various United Nations events and international conferences. She was also part of the National Women Peace Group (NAWOPEG) in Nigeria. The project was inaugurated by former Nigerian President Olusegun Obasanjo. In 2003, Olasubomi was involved in organizing the Commonwealth Heads of Government Meeting (CHOGM) in Nigeria, where she coordinated the Pan-Commonwealth event titled The Nigerian Dream, which celebrated peace ambassadors in Nigeria.
