= Hurlburt =

Hurlburt or Hurlbert may refer to:

== Surname ==
- Autumn Hurlbert (born 1980), American actress
- Bob Hurlburt (born 1950), Canadian ice hockey player
- G. Gordon Hurlburt (20th century), Canadian politician
- John Hurlburt (1898–1968), American football player
- Kenneth Earl Hurlburt (1928–2016), Canadian politician
- Marge Hurlburt (1914–1947), American aviator
- Philastus Hurlburt (1809–1883), American evangelical
- Richard Hurlburt (born 1950), Canadian politician
- JP Hurlbert (born 2008), American ice hockey player
- William Henry Hurlbert (1827–1895), American journalist

== Other ==
- Hurlburt, Indiana, U.S.
- Hurlburt Field, U.S. Air Force base in Okaloosa County, Florida
- Hurlbut Glacier, Greenland
- Hurlburt Hurricane, experimental airplane
- Hurlbut Township, Logan County, Illinois, U.S.

== See also ==
- Lewis Hurlbert Sr. House, historic home located at Aurora, Dearborn County, Indiana.
