= Manila (name) =

Manila is both a given name and a surname. Notable people with this name include:

== Given names ==
- Manila Esposito (born 2006), Italian gymnast
- Manila Flamini (born 1987), Italian synchronised swimmer
- Manila Nazzaro (born 1977), Italian model
- Manila Sotang, Nepali singer
- Manila Davis Talley (1898-1973), American pilot

== Surnames ==
- Gabriel Janer Manila (born 1940), Spanish writer

== See also ==
- Manila Luzon (stage name for Karl Philip Michael Westerberg), American drag queen
