= Urvina =

Urvina is a surname. Notable people with the surname include:

- Hermelinda Urvina (1905–2008), Ecuadorian pilot
- José María Urvina (1808–1891), President of Ecuador
