= Larry and Penny Thompson Memorial Park =

Park/campground in Miami-Dade County, Florida

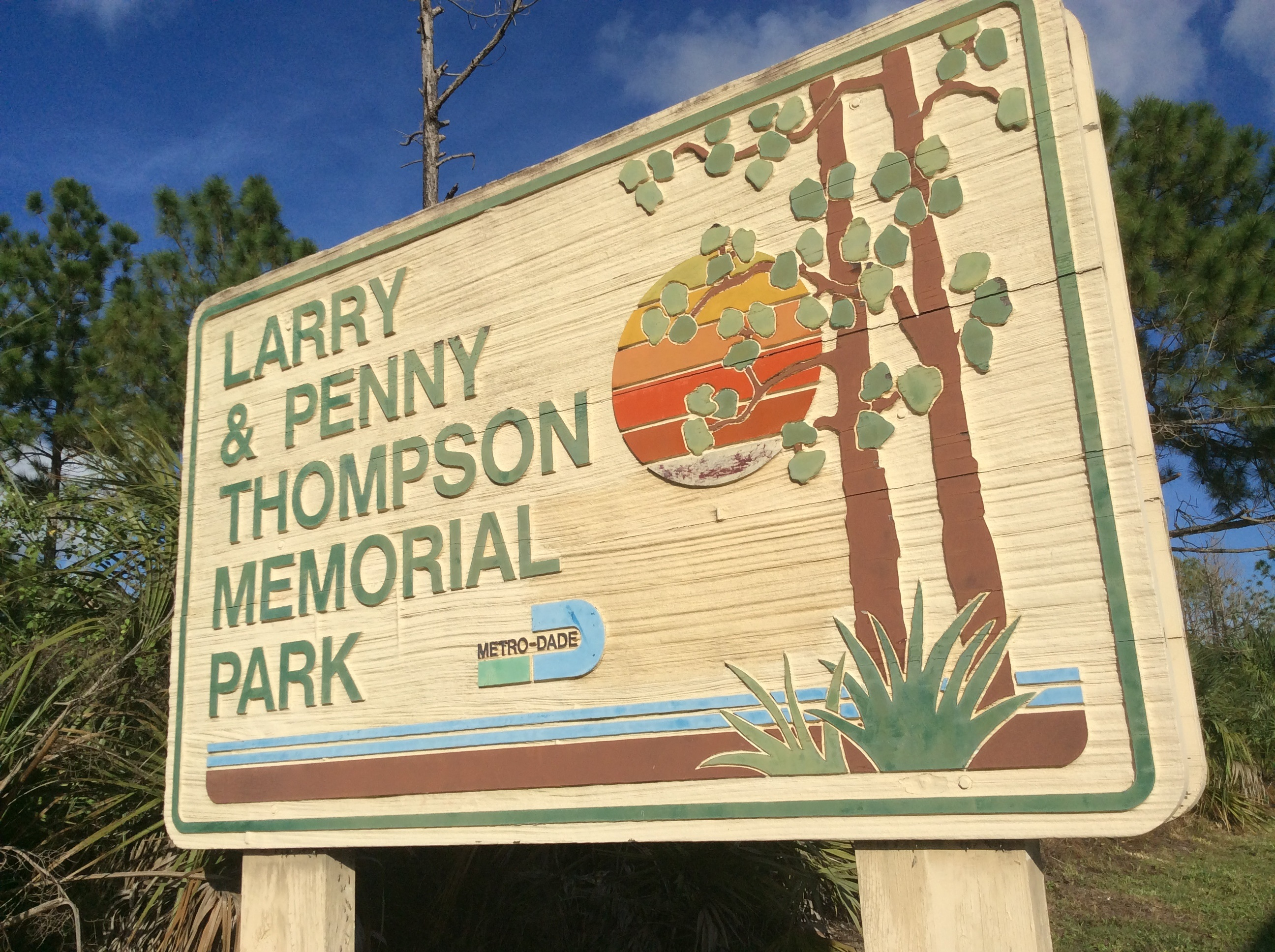
- Entrance signage
- Interactive map of Larry and Penny Thompson Memorial Park
- Type: Municipal
- Location: 12451 SW 184th St., Miami, Florida
- Coordinates: 25°35′55″N 80°23′55″W
- Area: 270 acres (110 ha)
- Created: 1977
- Operator: Miami-Dade County Parks and Recreation Department
- Open: All year
- Website: Larry and Penny Thompson Memorial Park and Campground

The Larry and Penny Thompson Memorial Park is the largest park/campground in Miami-Dade County (Florida).

The park, adjacent to Zoo Miami, totals 270 acres (of which 60 acres is dedicated to camping). It is located in southwest Miami, two miles west of the Florida Turnpike's Exit 13 between SW 134th Ave. and SW 122nd Ave. on the north side of Eureka Drive (SW 184th St.).

== Features ==
The park has a 22-acre lake, picnic shelters, restrooms, bike trails and horse trails. The 60-acre camping area has 240 RV sites and a heated pool. There’s additional space for tent camping. The campground office has a permanent historic display. It includes Larry Thompson’s 1941 Remington Noiseless Portable Typewriter he used to write his Miami Herald columns while on cross-country camping trips with his family, plus family photos and memorabilia.

== Namesakes ==
Larry Thompson was a humor columnist for the Miami Herald for more than two decades until his death February 18, 1973. He is in the Florida Newspaper Hall of Fame. His wife Gladys "Penny" Thompson (née Rhodes), who died September 22, 1975, was a pioneer in women’s aviation during the 1940s-1950s. She is in the Florida Aviation Hall of Fame and the Florida Women’s Hall of Fame. She was the Florida chapter president of the Ninety-Nines, the women’s pilot organization founded by Amelia Earhart. While in the Civil Air Patrol, she flew over the Gulf of Mexico searching for German submarines during World War II. Her plane was one of several hundred destroyed in a 1945 blimp hangar fire at the Naval Air Station Richmond, part of which was rebuilt as the park.

== History ==
The Larry and Penny Thompson Memorial Park was originally part of the Naval Air Station Richmond, which came into existence when the U.S. federal government acquired by eminent domain 2,107 acres of undeveloped land On September 15, 1942 it was commissioned as a base for U.S. Navy blimps in World War II to help protect ships on the Atlantic Ocean and Gulf of Mexico from German submarine attacks. On September 15, 1945, three years to the date the base was commissioned, a hurricane and subsequent fire destroyed all three 17-story wood hangars and everything inside: 366 military and civilian aircraft, 25 blimps and more than 100 vehicles.

A connection to the World War II past is evident today at the south entrance to the park off SW 184th St., where a large concrete directional arrow still stands in the ground, pointing north – a guide for blimp and airplane pilots who landed at the Naval Air Station. With the war over, the blimp base ceased operations. The hangars were never rebuilt and the blimps never returned. For the next 30 years, the land had varied uses including serving as the University of Miami's South Campus and a field research lab for 350 acres of fruit trees for the university. The parcel for the Larry and Penny Thompson Memorial Park and Campground (and Zoo Miami) was acquired in 1974 as part of a 1,010-acre land transfer from the U.S. government to Miami-Dade County.

Following the death of his parents, in late 1976, Carl Thompson lobbied the Miami-Dade County Commission to name the park after his parents. On November 17, 1975, the Miami-Dade County Commission unanimously voted to name the park the Larry and Penny Thompson Memorial Park.

The park was dedicated December 17, 1977. Gene Miller, two-time Pulitzer Prize winner for the Miami Herald, represented the paper at the dedication and presented a bronze plaque donated by the Herald. Today, the plaque is at the front of the campground office. The plaque quotes from Thompson’s February 3, 1956, Herald column: "All types of parks are needed in this complex civilization of ours, and we don’t have enough of any of them. Providing a place where a person can just sit --- where he can commune with God’s world – certainly is and always will be a primary requisite."

On August 24, 1992, Hurricane Andrew devastated the park and campground, severely damaging most of the picnic shelters and other buildings and flattening many of the trees. However, within a few years, the damage was repaired and the trees recovered.

== Books ==
History of Property
