= Dot Lemon =

American aviator (1907–1986)

- Dorothy "Dot" Lemon
- Born: 1907
- Died: 1986 (aged 78–79)
- Occupation: aviator
- Spouse: Richard (Dick) Lemon

Dorothy "Dot" Lemon (1907–1986) was a 20th-century American aviator whose career ranged from barnstorming in the 1920s to becoming the first woman president of the Institute of Navigation in the 1960s.

== Career in aviation ==
Dorothy, known as "Dot", was born in 1907 and adopted as Dorothy Martin by a pastor, Albert Martin, and his wife. Her birth certificate states that her biological father was a member of a Chicago family surnamed Whitney. She gained the name she is best known by following her 1937 marriage to fellow pilot Richard (Dick) Lemon.

In the early 1920s, Lemon took up flying in Syracuse, New York, learning from the early aviator and barnstormer Merrill K. Riddick. She flew her first solo flight in a Curtiss Jenny when she was 16. She became a barnstormer herself later in the decade.

Unable to make a living as a pilot, Lemon moved to Cicero, New York, where she took a job in advertising with the American Eagle Agency as New York state sales manager for Hayes Aviation.

Lemon claimed to have been the first person to intentionally fly into the eye of a hurricane, in 1932 in a Stinson Reliant monoplane, though there is no proof of this claim. If true, this would have been more than a decade before the flight by aviator Joseph Duckworth that is commonly accepted as the first premeditated foray into a hurricane's eye.

In the late 1930s, Lemon and her husband lived in Florida and together ran a flight school at Belvedere Field, an airfield later renamed Palm Beach International Airport. During World War II, Belvedere Field was used as a military training site.

In 1940, she became the chair of the newly formed Florida chapter of the Ninety-Nines, a leading international organization for women pilots.

After World War II, Lemon took up air racing, participating in the 1946 Halle Trophy Race and the 1948 Kendall Trophy Race, finishing third in the latter.

By the early 1960s, she had moved to southern California, where in 1961, she became the first woman to serve as president of the scientific Institute of Navigation (ION). During this period, she wrote an allegorical book, One One: A Story of the Life, Death, and the Resurrection of an Airplane (1963).

== Gold mining ==
In the 1960s, Lemon became interested in Venezuelan gold mines. In 1964, the Venezuelan government granted her title to a group of 25-year gold-property concessions collectively known as “Las Cristinas”. They are reputed to be potentially very valuable and have been the subject of worldwide ownership litigation since Lemon’s concessions expired with her death. Lemon died in Caracas, Venezuela, in 1986.

== Relationship with Leon Brink ==
While working with Hayes Aviation, Lemon became involved with World War I veteran Leon Perl Brink (1895–1944). She had four boys with Brink named William, Sherwood, Clinton, and Wellington.

== Legacy ==
Lemon's life story was the subject of an exhibition at the International Women's Air & Space Museum in 2012.
