= Betsy Ross Air Corps =

The Betsy Ross Air Corps (1931–1933) was a pre–World War II organization of female pilots formed to support the Army Air Corps and to be of service in times of emergency. Founded during the Great Depression by aviator Opal Kunz and named after Revolutionary War hero Betsy Ross, the short-lived corps was never formally recognized by the U.S. military.

== History ==
The founder of the Betsy Ross Air Corps, aviator Opal Kunz, had been disappointed that an earlier organization of women aviators, the Ninety-Nines, had not answered her goal of creating a women's national defense corps. So in 1931, Kunz formed the Betsy Ross Air Corps as a paramilitary service to support the Army Air Corps (the precursor to the U.S. Air Force) in national defense and to serve as humanitarian "air minutemen" in times of emergency. It also had the goal of offering flight instruction to women in order to build a reserve group of women aviators. Membership was available to licensed women pilots who were U.S. citizens. Student Pilots were eligible to join as Cadets.

Apart from Kunz, aviators present at the first meeting of the corps (either in person or by proxy) included: Pancho Barnes, Marjorie Stinson, Mary Goodrich Jenson, Ruth Elder, LaBelle Sweeley, Ruth Bridwell McConnell, Eleanor McRae, Jean LaRene, Jane Dodge, Manila Davis, Margery Doig, Gladys O'Donnell, May Haizlip, and E. Ruth Webb." Later members included Hattie Meyers Junkin, Aline Miller, Thelma Elliott, Althea Murphy, Lola Lo Lutz, Mary Moore, Mildred Morgan, Mary Nicholson, Mary Alexander, Peggy Remey, and Martha Morehouse. The corps was divided into nine areas across the country, each led by a Lieutenant Commander: Boston, New York, Germantown, Memphis, Columbus, Oshkosh, Kansas City, Tulsa, and Visalia.

On May 9, 1931, 14 of the 76 members met with the Chief of Naval Aeronautics and Chief of the Army Air Corps at the headquarters of the Daughters of the American Revolution to offer auxiliary aid in times of national emergency. The Corps was first headquartered in Kansas City, MO, at the Kansas City Municipal Airport though after a vote on Oct 7, 1933, it was decided to move the headquarters to Washington.

Kunz served as the corps' first commander, and her husband designed its insignia. The corps had its uniforms, described as tan breeches, lighter tan riding shirts, jodhpurs, dark brown English style military coats, and a dark brown beret with the organization's insignia. An anthem was commissioned for the corps. The corps has occasionally been referred to by the nickname "The Lady Bugs" or "Ladybirds".

Kunz grew the corps to about 100 members and kept it going for several years, partially funding it herself. Among its other activities, the corps took part in air shows to raise money for charities.

In a letter that Kunz later wrote to President John F. Kennedy, she said that she had intended to form a "Women’s Reserve Corp" [sic]. As it turned out, it was flier Pancho Barnes who afterwards formed the Women's Air Reserve as an unofficial branch of the U.S. Air Force.

== See also ==
- Women Airforce Service Pilots
