= Margaret Adams =

Margaret Adams is the name of:

- Margaret Q. Adams (1874–1974), first woman deputy sheriff in the United States
- Margaret Adams (pilot), Australian aviator
