= Arlene Davis =

American aviator and air racer

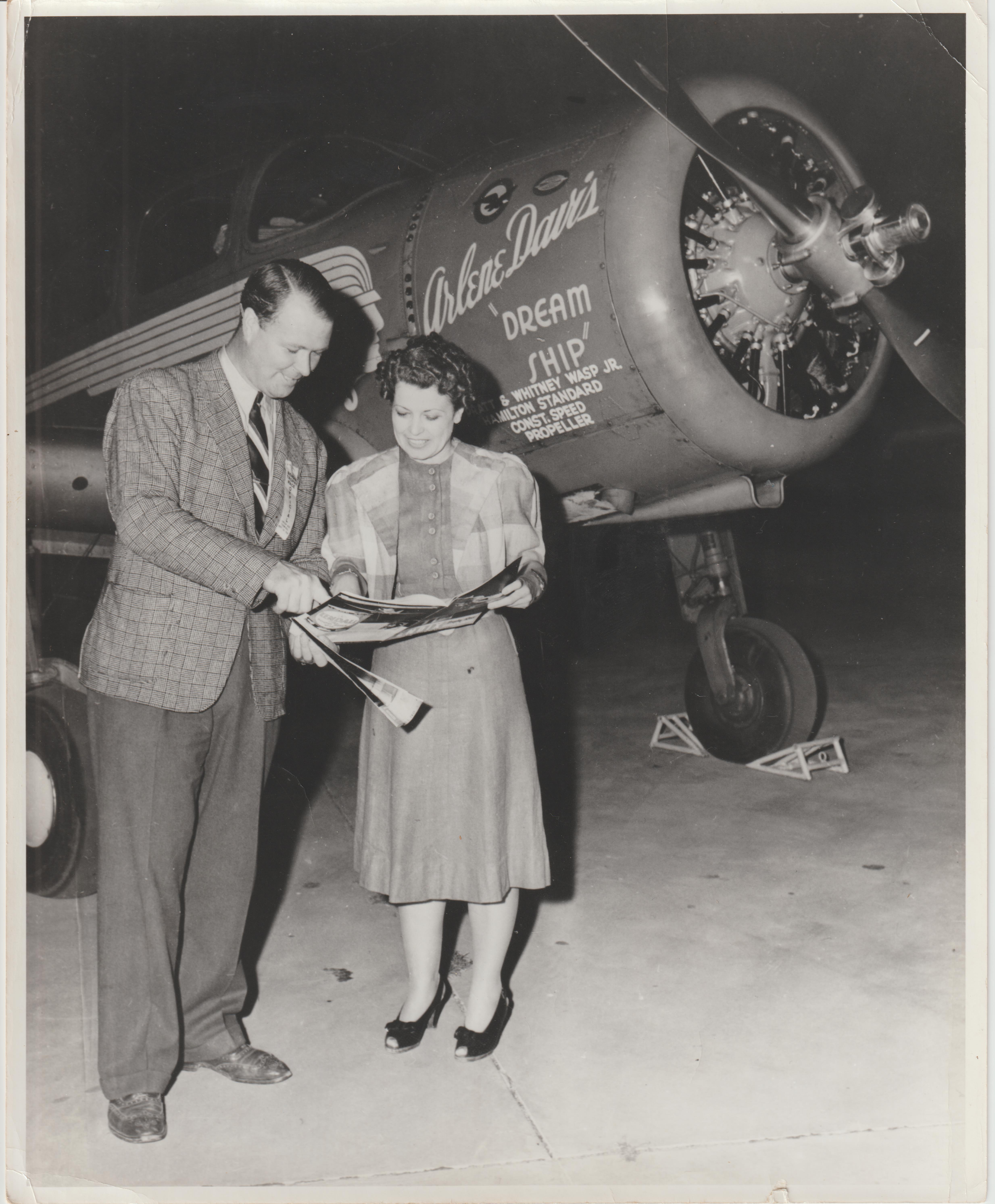
- Arlene Davis with Bendix Race official
- Born: c. 1910
- Died: 1964
- Occupation: Aviator
- Known for: first female private pilot instrument rating, air racer, international vice-president of The 99’s
- Spouse: Max T. Davis

Alma Arlene Davis (c. 1910 – 1964) was an American aviator and air racer who was the first private pilot to receive an instrument rating and the first to fly a private plane across the North and South Atlantic oceans in a single trip.

== Biography ==
Alma Arlene Davis started out studying art in Chicago, Illinois, and Cleveland, Ohio. She became interested in flying when her husband bought a plane and earned her pilot's license in 1931. She later became the first private pilot to receive an instrument rating and the first woman to earn her 4M qualification for piloting multiengine planes. By 1940, she held "more different and difficult kinds of ratings than...99 out of 100...commercial pilots".

She soon began participating in air races, winning the first race she participated in (Dayton, Illinois, 1934) as well as the 1936 Miami-Havana International Air Race. In 1938, she was the only woman to take part in the New York–Miami MacFadden Race, and in 1939 she finished fifth in the Los Angeles–New York Bendix Race. She finished fourth in the 1946 Halle Trophy Race.

During World War II, she taught instrument flying to Army and Navy aviators at Baldwin-Wallace College. She also served as President Eisenhower's aviation chair for Ohio and was chair of the Office of Civil Defense's Operation Skywatch in the region encompassing Ohio, West Virginia, and Kentucky.

In 1950 to 1951, Davis served as the international vice-president of the Ninety-Nines.

In 1959, she flew 20,000 miles across the North and South Atlantic oceans in her twin-engine Beech Travel Air, with Clay Donges as her navigator. The trip took 13 days and was the first time that a private plane had flown the North and South Atlantic in a single trip.

Flying and Popular Aviation magazine named her America's outstanding woman pilot of "big ships" in 1940. She was the first woman to receive the Veteran's Pilot Award, and the first woman to be honored with the Elder Statesman of Aviation Award.

Davis died of cancer in 1964.

== Personal life ==
Davis was married to Max T. Davis, president of a Cleveland, Ohio, packing company.
