= Straughan =

Straughan is a surname. Notable people with the surname include:

- Jane Straughan (1913–2007), American aviator and Women Airforce Service Pilot from 1942 to 1944
- Paulin Tay Straughan (born 1963), Singaporean academic and Nominated Member of Parliament
- Peter Straughan (born 1968), English playwright and author
- Ryan Straughan, Barbadian politician and economist
