= Gertrude Selma Sober =

American geologist and mining company executive

- Gertrude Selma Sober Field
- Born: December 26, 1869; Farragut, Iowa, United States
- Died: November 2, 1949 (aged 79); Oklahoma City, United States
- Occupations: Geologist and mining company executive

Gertrude Selma Sober Field (December 26, 1869 — November 2, 1949) was an American geologist and mining company executive, credited with discovering the zinc in the Arbuckle Mountains in Oklahoma. She was called "Queen of the Arbuckles", and inducted posthumously into the National Mining Hall of Fame in 1988.

== Early life and education ==
Gertrude Selma Sober was born near Farragut, Iowa, the daughter of Morris Smith Sober and Isabel Rebecca Beaston Sober. At age 19, she moved with her family to Oklahoma City, as part of the Land Rush of 1889.

== Career ==
Sober worked as a stenographer and teacher in Oklahoma, but she experimented with raising crops, and enjoyed searching for minerals in her free time. She began raising money for a mining company in 1906, and was called by one Oklahoma newspaper a "noted mineralogist and geologist" as early as 1907. She was prospecting with a local doctor, R. C. Hope, in 1909 when she discovered zinc, and what became the Southwest Davis Zinc Field, a major deposit in Oklahoma. She and Hope formed the short-lived Indian Mining and Development Company, with Sober as president. In the 1910s she invested in the Bellah zinc mine in Arkansas, and was superintendent of the mine.

Late in life, Sober ran a rooming house for students in Norman, Oklahoma, and took up studies at the University of Oklahoma. She finished university at age 64 with a bachelor's degree in geology in 1933 (the first woman to earn a geology degree at that institution). She published at least one research paper, on rock formations in Noble County, Oklahoma.

In 1988, she was inducted into the National Mining Hall of Fame in Colorado, with her nomination promoted by the Association for Women Geoscientists.

== Personal life ==
Gertrude Sober married Chester Field, a miner, in early 1918. He died in the 1918 flu pandemic the following autumn. Gertrude Sober Field died in 1949, age 79, in Oklahoma City.
