= Jessie E. Woods =

United States air force female pilot

- Born: January 27, 1909
- Died: March 17, 2001 (aged 92)

Jessie E. Woods (27 January 1909 – 17 March 2001) was one of the first female pilots in the United States.

Jessie E. Schulz was born 27 January 1909, in Stafford County, Kansas, the daughter of William and Clara (Miller) Schulz. She also lived in Wichita, Kansas, where she garnered a love for aviation from childhood, watching aircraft come and go, very often every day, as they were manufactured nearby.

In 1928, at the age of 19, Jessie left home with her boyfriend, Jimmie Woods, and they married on 28 August 1928 in Wichita. The Woods' then went on to form the Flying Aces Air Circus, which lasted until 1938, setting a record for the longest-lasting air circus of all time. The Woods and other pilots performing with them flew every weekend at different places.

Woods was a daredevil. She was also the circus lady, flying aircraft on the circus show, often performing dangerous landings. She also walked on the wings of flying aircraft, parachuting off, or dangling below them, with her knees holding a rope ladder. Once while wing walking, she fell off at 3,000 feet (910 m); ordinarily, she did not wear a parachute, but this time she did. The circus closed in 1938.

During World War II, Woods served with the Civil Air Patrol and upon returning from the war, she became an aircraft mechanic and flying instructor. In 1941, she and her husband Jimmie leased a field in South Carolina, with the American government shortly after granting the couple licenses to train military pilots.

After Jimmie Woods, who became a legend himself because of the connection with the "Flying Aces" circus, died in the late 1950s, Jessie Woods continued flying all over her home country, gaining a commercial pilot's license. She was admired by many during the era when feminist ideas were gaining prominence among American women.

She was employed by the State of Washington and in 1967, was named the state of Washington's pilot of the year.

In 1985, she was elected to the OX5 Aviation Pioneers Hall of Fame; in 1991, she received the A.E. Aviation Award from the Zonta Club of St. Petersburg, Florida; in 1994, she was the only woman to be honoured as an Eagle at the Gathering of Eagles, Maxwell Air Force Base, Montgomery, Alabama.

She was a member of the Ninety-Nines, International Women Pilots, OX 5 Pioneers, and the Lutheran Church.

Jessie E. Woods retired from flying in 1994 and died on 17 March 2001, at Great Bend, Kansas, at the age of 92. She was buried at Fairview Park Cemetery in St. John, Kansas.
