= Alia Twal =

Jordanian airline pilot (born 1988)

- Born: 1988 (age 37–38)
- Known for: Arabian Section of the 99s
- Awards: 2015 Inspiration Award; 2016 Honourable Company of Air Pilots
- Aviation career
- Rank: A320 First Officer

Alia Twal (born 1988) is a commercial airline pilot from Jordan. She flies for Royal Jordanian Airlines. In 2016, Twal was made a Liveryman in the Honourable Company of Air Pilots, becoming the fourth Jordanian to receive this position.

== Biography ==
Twal was inspired to become a pilot at the age of 16 when she first learned about Jordanian women pilots at a school career event. Twal started learning to fly in 2006, graduating from the Ayla Aviation Academy in Aqaba, now known as Airways Aviation Academy. She was a flight instructor at the academy for three years before joining the Royal Jordanian Airlines as first an A320 first officer in 2011, and then an A330 first officer in 2016 before returning to the A320. Twal is also the governor of the Arabian Section of the Ninety-Nines and has established a scholarship in honor of Yvonne Trueman, the section's founder and first Bahraini women to gain a pilot's license.

As one of the few women Jordanian pilots and head of her chapter of the Ninety-Nines, which includes pilot Carol Rabadi, Twal advocates for gender equality.

== Awards and nominations ==
- 2015: Award of Inspiration, the Ninety-Nines
