= Mary Goodrich Jenson =

American aviator & journalist (1907–2004)

- Mary Goodrich Jenson - aviator
- Born: November 6, 1907; Hartford, Connecticut, U.S.
- Died: January 4, 2004 (aged 96–97); Hartford, Connecticut, U.S.
- Occupation: journalist
- Known for: Ninety-Nines
- Spouse: Carl D. Jenson

Mary Goodrich Jenson (November 6, 1907 – January 4, 2004) was an early woman aviator and journalist who became the first woman in Connecticut to earn a pilot's license and the first woman to fly solo to Cuba. She was inducted into the Connecticut Women's Hall of Fame in 2000.

== Education and personal life ==
Mary Goodrich was born in Hartford, Connecticut on November 6, 1907, to Ella E. (Reed) Goodrich and James Raymond Goodrich. Her grandfather Elizur Stillman Goodrich ran the Hartford–New York Steamboat Company and the Hartford–Wethersfield Horse Railway. She attended the Collegio Gazzola in Verona, Italy, and Gibbs College before moving on to Columbia University.

In 1940, she married Carl D. Jenson, with whom she had two children.

== Career as pilot and journalist ==
Jenson earned her pilot's license in 1927, at the age of 20, thereby becoming the first woman in Connecticut to achieve that milestone. While she was still training for her pilot's license, she also pursued a career in journalism. The Hartford Courant hired her as its first aviation editor on condition that she obtain her pilot's license before a rival reporter for the Hartford Times, which she did. She would later become the first woman to have a bylined column in the paper.

A year after obtaining her license, Jenson bought her first plane, a Fairchild KR-21 single-engine biplane. She competed in air shows in events such as racing and "bomb throwing," which involved dropping bags of flour at ground targets.

In the late 1920s, a group of women pilots formed a national organization called the Ninety-Nines to provide support for women in aviation. Jenson was one of the 99 charter members of the group.

Jenson was a director of the short-lived Betsy Ross Air Corps (1929–1933), which was founded during the Depression to support the Army Air Corps, though it was never formally recognized by the U.S. military.

Jenson flew her biplane all around the state and around 1933 became the first woman to fly solo to Cuba. Due to failing vision, she lost her flying license after the Cuba trip.

== Post-flying career ==
In 1936, Jenson was a passenger on the Hindenburg airship for a flyover of Hartford during its first and only full year of service.

In the later 1930s, Jenson briefly worked for Walt Disney Productions in California, especially on the film Dumbo. It was there that she met her future husband.

In 1941, they moved to Wethersfield, Connecticut, where Jenson became heavily involved in civic volunteerism. She founded and served as president for the town's Women's Association and also served on the Board of Education and the Council of Social Agencies of Greater Hartford.

Mary Jenson died in Hartford in early 2004.

== Legacy ==
Jenson's family established a memorial fund in her honor at the Wethersfield Historical Society, which holds numerous historical objects and artefacts from Jenson and her family.
