= National WASP WWII Museum =

National WASP World War II Museum

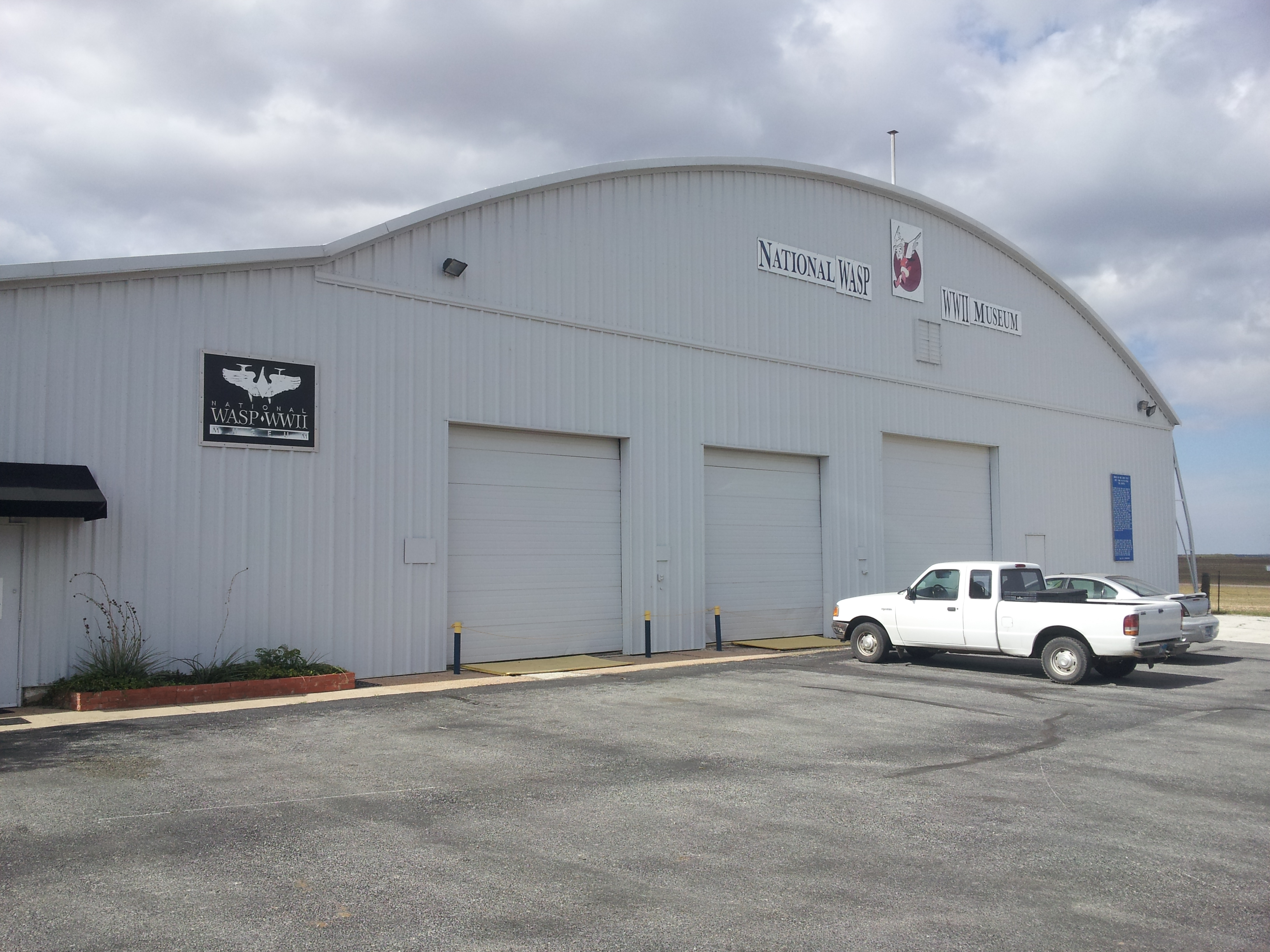
- Hangar No. 2

- Location within Texas Location within the United States
- Established: 2003
- Location: Sweetwater, Texas
- Coordinates: 32.4586°N 100.4642°W
- Type: Aviation museum
- Founders: Deanie Bishop Parrish; Nancy Parrish
- Website: www.waspmuseum.org

The National WASP World War II Museum is an aviation museum located at the Avenger Field near Sweetwater, Texas focused on Women Airforce Service Pilots.

== History ==
The museum was established in 2003 by Deanie Bishop Parrish and her daughter Nancy Parrish. It opened in a 11,700 sq ft (1,090 m^{2}) 1929 hangar in May 2005.

A PT-19 was placed on loan to the museum in 2008.

The museum announced plans for a 8,600 sq ft (800 m^{2}) exhibition hall on the north side of the hangar to improve artifact storage and increase display area in October 2014. The design eventually changed so that by the time it was dedicated in April 2017, the expansion had become an entirely separate building with an external appearance similar to the historic Hangar No. 1. (Note: The original wooden hangar burned down in the 1950s.) Along with the completion of phase one of its development program, the museum hired a new executive director. Then, in December, a BT-13 was donated to the museum by the American Aviation Heritage Foundation.

The museum closed for its phase two expansion – the addition of a welcome center, office space and the Catherine Vail Bridge Education Center – in November 2020.

The museum acquired an AT-6 in 2023.

== Collection ==
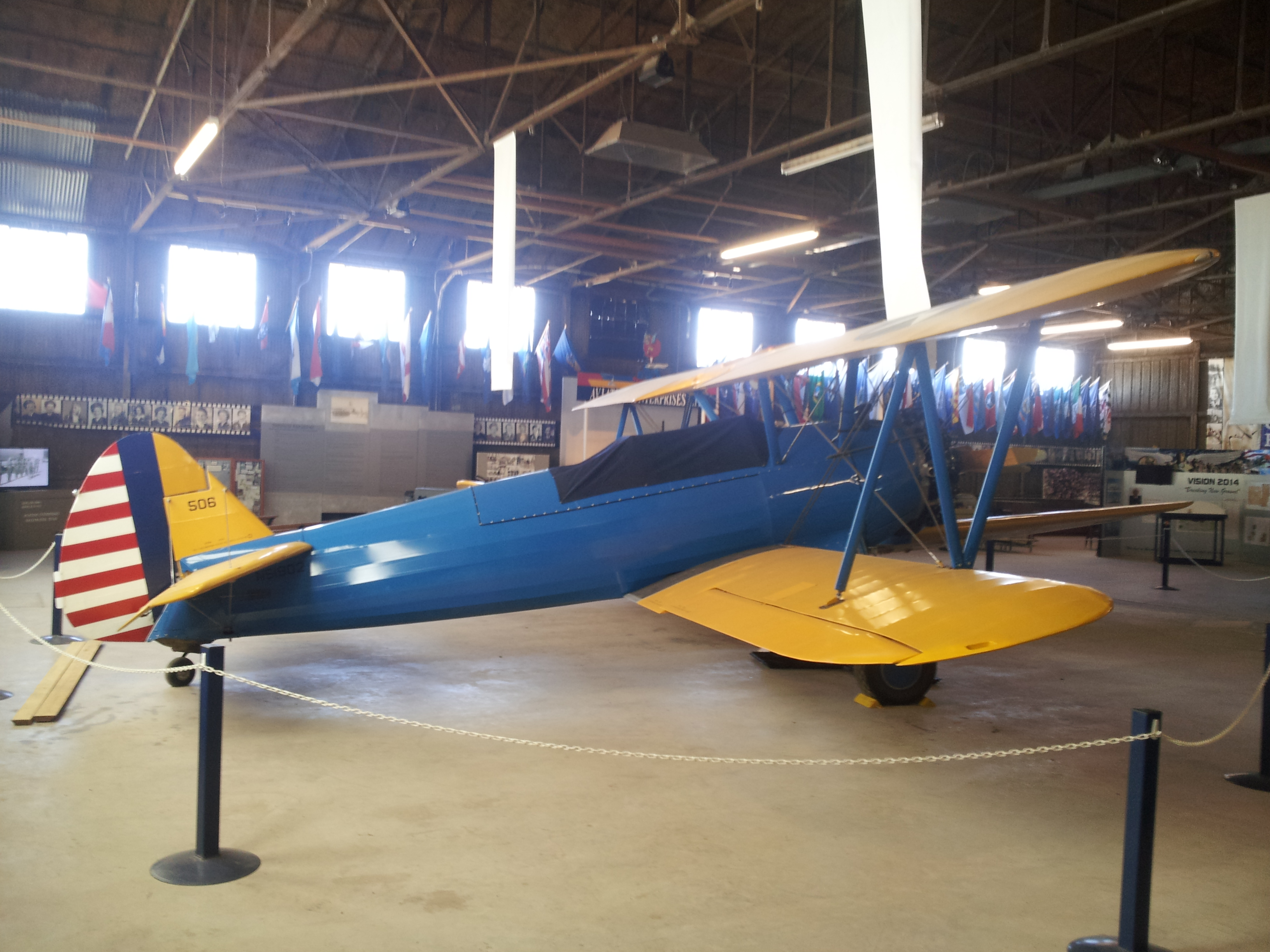
Stearman PT-18 Kaydet

- Cessna UC-78 Bobcat
- Curtiss-Wright CW-12Q
- North American AT-6D Texan
- Stearman PT-18 Kaydet
- Vultee BT-13A Valiant

== Events ==
The museum holds an annual Homecoming and Fly-In.

== See also ==
- Amelia Earhart Hangar Museum
- International Women's Air & Space Museum
- Ninety-Nines Museum of Women Pilots
