= Norah O'Neill =

American aviator

Norah O'Neill (August 23, 1949 – September 22, 2017) was an American aviator who learned to fly in 1973 and became the first woman pilot for Alaska Central Air (1974) and the Flying Tiger Line (1976).

During her thirty-five years as an airline pilot, Norah amassed 22,000 hours and was the first woman in the world to pilot the Douglas DC-8 (1977) and to fly passengers on the Boeing 747 (August, 1980).

Piloting large jet transports on trans-pacific routes for Flying Tigers resulted in Norah being photographed and interviewed by Asian publications as the first woman airline pilot to land in Korea, Japan, the Philippines, Malaysia, Saudi Arabia and Hong Kong.

Mentoring and encouraging the female aviators who followed her was an important part of Norah's career. She was one of the founders of the International Society of Women Airline Pilots (ISA + 21) in 1978. She served as vice president of that society for two years and as historian for twenty years. She was also a contributing member of the Women in Aviation International (WAI) and The Ninety-Nines: International Organization of Women Pilots. Norah spoke at schools and institutions about women pursuing their dream careers. Norah was forced to retire from flying early due to ME/CFS she developed after a viral illness and fought a successful legal battle to qualify for disability benefits. Norah Ellen O'Neill died on September 22, 2017, at her home in Seattle of colon cancer.

== Author ==
Norah's memoir, Flying Tigress (p.2005), gives a candid account of the many challenges she overcame to become a woman 747 pilot in the male dominated commercial pilot profession.

Norah was a contributing writer for Tiger Tales, An Anecdotal History of the Flying Tiger Line (p.2000) and Heart of a Military Woman (p. 2009).

== Honoree ==
Norah has been featured in exhibits about women in aviation at various air and space museums, including the San Diego Aerospace Museum (1994) and the "Chasing Horizons: Women in Aerospace" exhibit at the Museum of Flight at Boeing Field in Seattle (2010).

In 2009, Norah was inducted into the International Forest of Friendship for her outstanding contributions to aviation.

In 2010 she was one of 100 women pioneers honored by the University of Washington Women's Center at the suffrage centennial gala, "Women Unbound".

== Artist ==
After retirement in 2009, Norah resided in the Pacific Northwest where she created wearable art for Tigress One Designs.
