= Larry Thompson (humorist) =

American humor columnist and newspaper reporter (1911–1973)

Lawrence "Larry" Thompson
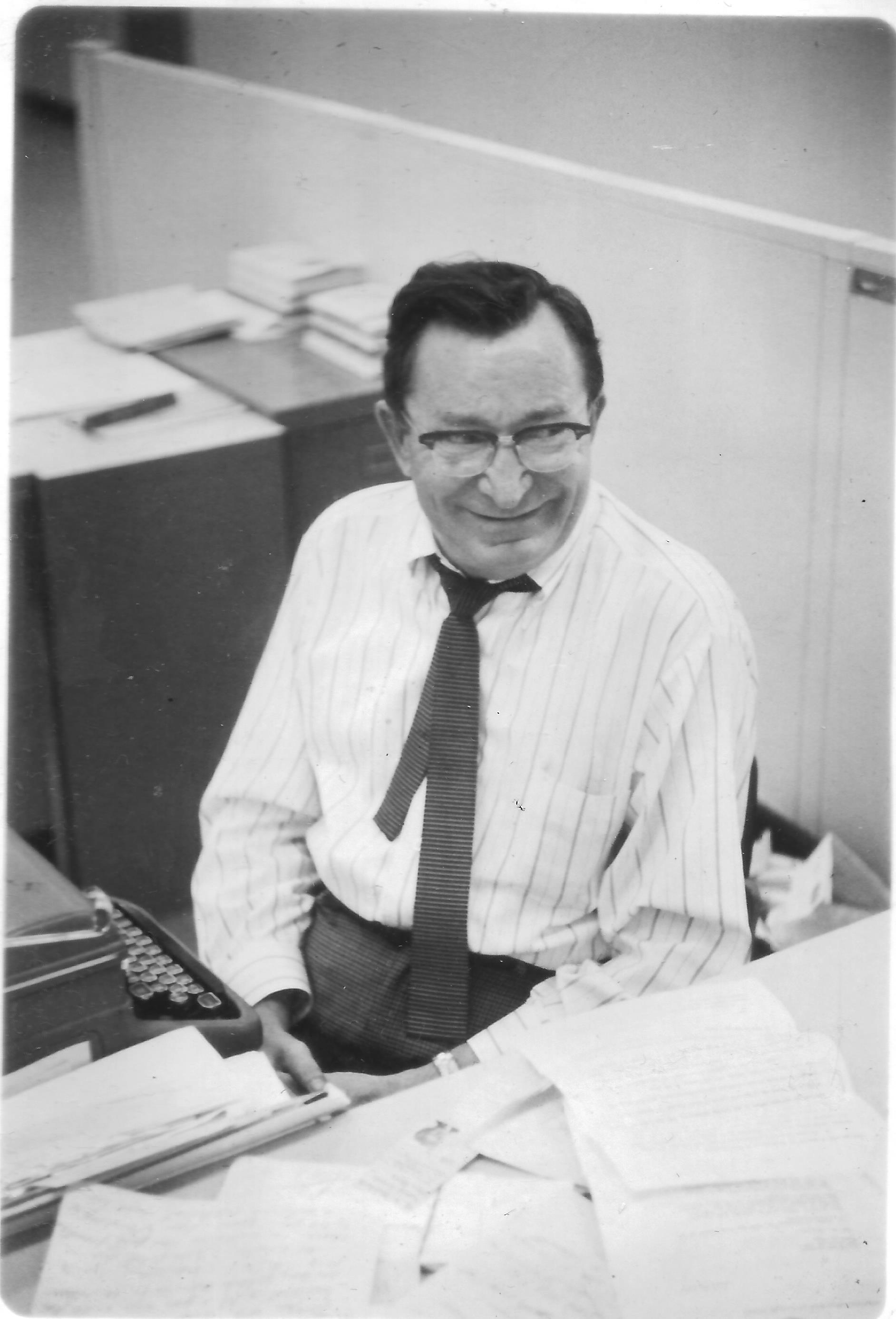
- Larry Thompson at work at The Miami Herald, 1969
- Born: November 20, 1911; Garrison, Kansas
- Died: February 18, 1973 (aged 61); Miami, Florida
- Monuments: Larry and Penny Thompson Memorial Park (Miami Dade County, FL)
- Other name: "Scoop" Thompson
- Education: B.S. History
- Alma mater: Oklahoma State University
- Occupations: Newspaper Columnist; Newspaper reporter, author, public speaker
- Years active: 1928–1973
- Employer: The Miami Herald
- Known for: Humor column "Life With Larry Thompson," published daily in The Miami Herald for more than two decades.
- Notable work: Three books published by Wake-Brook House: Life With Caesar, Hogs Under My Bed and Life With Larry Thompson
- Successor: Dave Barry
- Spouse: Penny Thompson
- Awards: Dale Carnegie Alumni Association Good Human Relations Award 1965; Florida Newspaper Hall of Fame

Lawrence Thompson (1911-1973) was an American humor columnist and newspaper reporter for 28 years with The Miami Herald, until his death in 1973.

== Early years ==
Thompson grew up in Stillwater, Oklahoma, where he began a newspaper career that would span almost a half-century. After graduating from Oklahoma A. & M. College (now Oklahoma State University), he worked on newspapers throughout the United States as a reporter, including the New York Herald Tribune. In his early days, he was known as "Scoop" Thompson. He came to work for The Miami Herald in 1945 as a general assignment reporter.

Within a few years, Thompson was writing a daily humor column, called "Life With Larry Thompson," which ran in the Comics Section of The Miami Herald for more than two decades. Following his death, the Associated Press described Thompson's column as "down-home humor" that was "one of the first items read over morning coffee by hundreds of thousands of Herald subscribers."

In 1953 Thompson married aviator Gladys "Penny" Rhodes, after interviewing her for a story about women pilots and her involvement promoting international women’s air races in South Florida. On April Fool’s Day, 1954, they had twins, Carl and Evellen, receiving national publicity in Life Magazine.

In 1965 the Dale Carnegie Alumni Association awarded Thompson the Good Human Relations Award.

== Author ==
Thompson wrote three books. The first was about the family's Siamese cat, "Life With Caesar." The second book was "Hogs Under My Bed" which chronicled the family’s camping trip one summer through Florida, including one night when wild pigs slept under the Thompson’s tent trailer during a rain storm, hence the title. The third book, "Life With Larry Thompson," a collection of Thompson’s most popular columns, was published posthumously in 1975.

Thompson's columns, especially tales of his family's cross-country camping trips each summer, were often reprinted in newspapers throughout America and in the United States Congressional Record.

== Death and legacy ==
On February 18, 1973 at the age of 61, Thompson died of emphysema. Thompson’s wife, Penny, died at 57 from acute leukemia in 1975. The Metro Dade County Commission voted to name a 270-acre park/campground in their honor --- the Larry and Penny Thompson Memorial Park located in Miami next to Zoo Miami. In 2012, son Carl Thompson donated Larry Thompson's typewriter used to write his columns along with photographs and other family memorabilia to the campground at the 35th anniversary of the park's dedication. These are on permanent display in the campground office.

In 2015, Thompson was inducted into the Florida Newspaper Hall of Fame.
