= Amelia Earhart Birthplace =

Historic house in Kansas, United States

- U.S. National Register of Historic Places
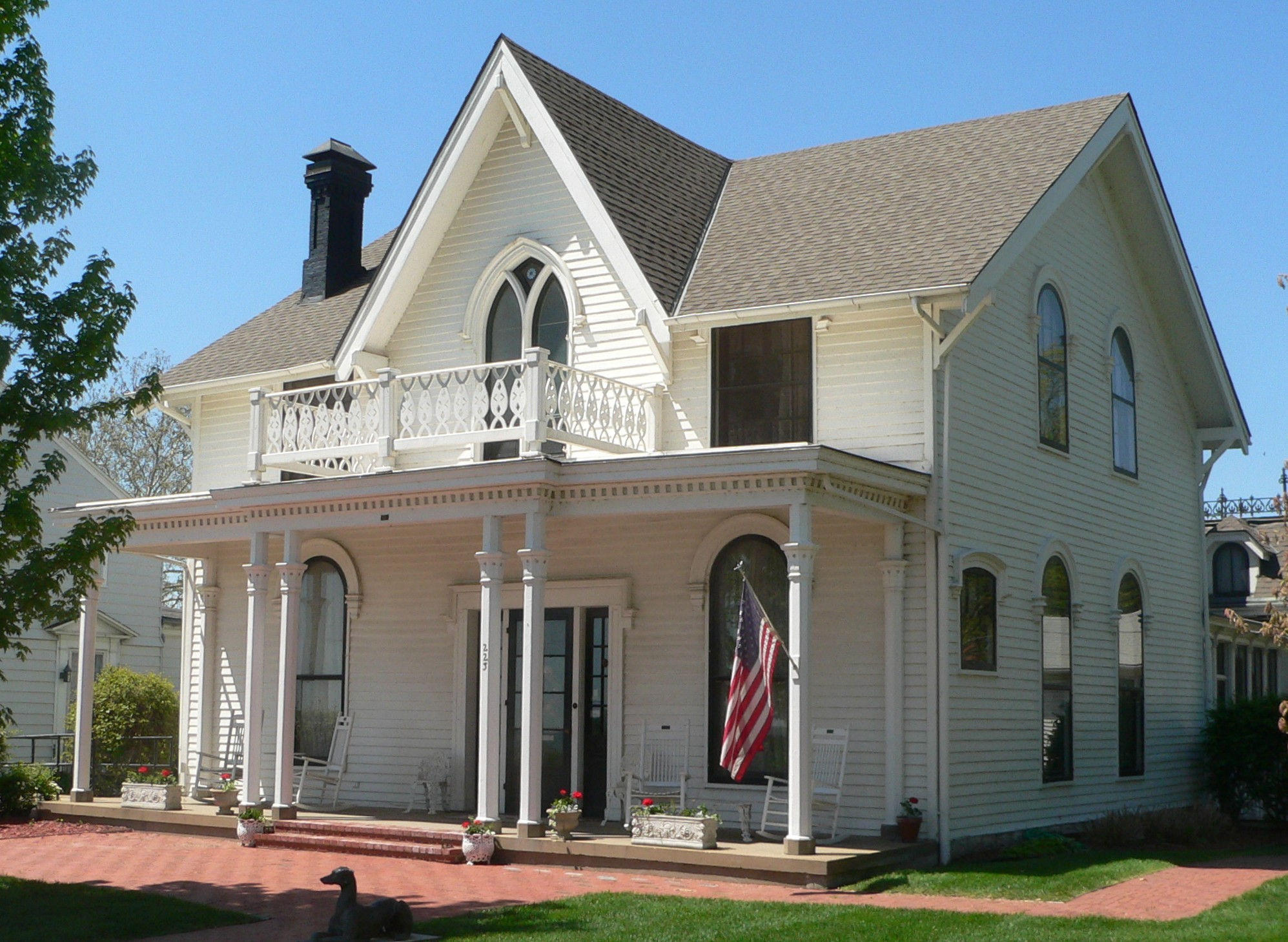
- A white two-story Gothic Revival house

- Location within Kansas Location within the United States
- Location: 223 N. Terrace St., Atchison, Kansas
- Coordinates: 39.563758°N 95.114486°W
- Built: 1861
- Architectural style: Gothic Revival
- NRHP reference No.: 71000302
- Added to NRHP: April 16, 1971

The Amelia Earhart Birthplace is a historic building and museum that was the birthplace of aviator Amelia Earhart. It is located at 223 N. Terrace St. in Atchison, Kansas, United States.

The house was built in 1861 in a Gothic Revival style and is on a bluff overlooking the Missouri River. There was one major addition to the home in 1873, during which the formal dining room, cook's quarters, and a back porch were added. In 1897, Amelia Earhart was born in the home, which belonged to her maternal grandfather, Alfred Gideon Otis (1827–1912), a former judge, president of the Atchison Savings Bank, and a leading citizen in Atchison. The Earhart family attended nearby Trinity Episcopal Church, where Amelia was baptized. The birthplace was added to the National Register of Historic Places in 1971, and is a museum featuring memorabilia and artifacts about Amelia Earhart. The house served as a private residence until 1984, when a local citizen, Dr. Eugene J. Bribach, contributed $100,000 to the Ninety-Nines to acquire the property. Since 1984, the building has been maintained by the Ninety-Nines, an international group of female pilots of whom Amelia was the first elected president.

== See also ==
- Amelia Earhart Hangar Museum
- Ninety-Nines Museum of Women Pilots
