= The Ninety-Nines Museum of Women Pilots =

- Location of the 99s Museum of Women Pilots The Ninety-Nines Museum of Women Pilots (the United States)
- Established: 1999
- Location: 4300 Amelia Earhart Drive; Oklahoma City, United States
- Coordinates: 35.40573°N 97.59756°W
- Type: Aviation museum
- Website: ninety-nines.org museumofwomenpilots.org

The Ninety-Nines Museum of Women Pilots (MWP) is a non-profit museum and research institute that seeks to preserve the unique history of women in aviation. It is located on the second story of the international headquarters building of the non-profit International Organization of Women Pilots: The Ninety-Nines ("99s") on the grounds of Will Rogers World Airport in Oklahoma City, Oklahoma. The 5,000-square-foot (460 m^{2}) museum houses the largest collection of historical women aviator artifacts in the world.

== History ==
First known as "The Ninety-Nines", the MWP was established in New York City by 99 women pilots during 1929. Its headquarters moved from New York to Oklahoma City in 1955. In 1972, the museum was formally established as the "Resource Center," that included a library, archives, museum and oral/video history collection. The quantity of artifacts soon outgrew its allotted space, so a separate museum was created and opened to the public in 1999.

== Collections ==
Artifacts include historical papers, personal items, video and oral histories, photos, memorabilia and other notable artifacts from pioneering women aviators worldwide. The museum collection and exhibits provide insight into the role women pilots played in the development of aviation and their historical footprint. The museum is home to personal artifacts of Amelia Earhart and information about her pioneering aviation career.

== See also ==
- Amelia Earhart Birthplace
- Amelia Earhart Hangar Museum
- International Women's Air & Space Museum
- National WASP WWII Museum
