= Amelia Earhart Hangar Museum =

Aviation museum in Atchison, Kansas, US

- Location within Kansas Location within the United States
- Location: Atchison, Kansas
- Coordinates: 39.5685°N 95.1783°W
- Type: Aviation museum
- Founder: Laidacker M. "Ladd" Seaberg
- Website: www.ameliaearharthangarmuseum.org

The Amelia Earhart Hangar Museum is an aviation museum located at Amelia Earhart Airport in Atchison, Kansas, focused on Amelia Earhart.

== History ==
=== Background ===
In 1979, Grace McGuire purchased a Lockheed 10-E from the Wings and Wheels Museum in Orlando, Florida. (Note: The museum claims that Muriel is the last Model 10-E Electra. However, another example of this aircraft is on display at the Museum of Flight.) She intended to restore it to flight and use it to recreate Amelia Earhart's attempted circumnavigation. After trying and failing to interest Pratt & Whitney in supporting the effort and being diagnosed with multiple sclerosis, McGuire was forced to abandon the effort.

=== Establishment ===
Laidacker M. "Ladd" Seaberg, an Atchison economic development promoter, and his wife Karen made contact with McGuire in the early 1990s. They eventually purchased the airplane from her and it was transported to Atchison in August 2016. The following year, the museum announced plans for what would eventually become a 17,000 sq ft (1,600 m^{2}) hangar.

The building first opened to the public on 1 February 2023, before being officially dedicated 14 April. The museum hired Mindi Love Pendergraft as a new executive director three months later. In the meantime, the foundation had funded the creation and placement of a bronze statue of Amelia Earhart in the National Statuary Hall Collection.

== Exhibits ==
The museum is centered around the restored Muriel—a Lockheed Model 10-E Electra (identical to the plane Earhart flew on her final flight). The museum also features 14 interactive exhibits, including a virtual reality experience. A bronze statue of Amelia Earhart is also on display outside the museum.

== Collection ==
- Lockheed 10-E Electra Muriel

== Events ==
An annual Amelia Earhart festival is held at the airport.

== See also ==
- Amelia Earhart Birthplace
- International Women's Air & Space Museum
- National WASP WWII Museum
- Ninety-Nines Museum of Women Pilots
