= Opal Kunz =

American aviator (1864–1967)

- Born: Opal Logan Giberson; November 6, 1894
- Died: May 15, 1967 (aged 72); Auburn, California, US
- Resting place: Auburn Old Cemetery, Auburn, California; plot 127B-3
- Known for: founder of the Betsy Ross Air Corps
- Spouse: George Frederick Kunz

Opal Kunz (November 6, 1894 – May 15, 1967) was an early American aviator, the chief organizer of the Betsy Ross Air Corps, and a charter member of the Ninety-Nines organization of women pilots. In 1930, she became the first woman pilot to race with men in an open competition. She made many public appearances to urge more women to take up flying.

== Personal history ==
Opal Logan Giberson was born in 1894 in Missouri to Edward F. Giberson and his wife. (Note: Kunz's cemetery burial card indicates that her mother's maiden name was Gribble.) She graduated from Dana Hall School in Wellesley, Massachusetts.

In 1923, she married mineralogist George Frederick Kunz (1856–1932). The marriage was annulled in 1929. The couple remained on good terms, with Kunz caring for George for the remainder of his life. On his death, he left her a substantial bequest.

== Aviation career ==
Kunz earned her pilot's license in 1929. A crash two weeks later in New Jersey drew extensive press coverage; she escaped uninjured. A second crash two years later left her with gasoline burns.

She spent a great deal of time and money on her flying pursuits and always named her planes after Betsy Ross. On April 7, 1930, at the Philadelphia American Legion Benefit Air Meet, she became the first woman to race with men in open competition. She won the race.

Kunz gave frequent press interviews and radio addresses to urge more women to take up flying.

=== Powder Puff Derby ===
In 1929, Kunz participated in the first Women's Air Derby, later dubbed the "Powder Puff Derby" by humorist Will Rogers. At the time, there were only 70 licensed female pilots in the entire United States, and only 40 qualified to take part in this contest. The course began in Santa Monica, California, and ended in Cleveland, Ohio.

Race rules stipulated that the aircraft must have horsepower "appropriate for a woman." Kunz was told her own 300-horsepower Beech Travel Air was too fast for a woman to handle and would not be allowed. Forced to borrow a less-powerful airplane in order to take part in the race, she finished eighth.

=== Death of John Donaldson ===
On September 7, 1930, Kunz loaned her plane to aviator John Donaldson at the American Legion Air Races meet in Scranton, Pennsylvania. Donaldson suffered fatal injuries when the airplane fell from a height of 1,800 feet straight down into the municipal airfield.

=== Betsy Ross Air Corps ===
Kunz was an organizer of the Betsy Ross Air Corps, a paramilitary service formed to support the Army Air Corps (the precursor to the U.S. Air Force) in national defense and to serve as humanitarian "air minutemen" in times of emergency. It also had the goal of offering flight instruction to women in order to build a reserve group of women aviators. Kunz grew the corps to about 100 members, partially funding it herself. She served as the corps' first commander, and her husband designed its insignia. The short-lived corps (1931–1933) was never formally recognized by the U.S. military.

=== World War II ===
As World War II approached, Kunz began teaching aviation students at Arkansas State College. In 1942, she moved to Rhode Island, and at the start of World War II became an instructor at the Rhode Island state airport for Navy cadets and for the government-sponsored Civilian Pilot Training Program. She taught several hundred young men how to fly for the war effort.

== Later years ==
After the war, she became an inspector for the Aerojet Corporation in California.

In 1961, following after the historic space flight of the Russian cosmonaut Yuri Gagarin, she wrote to President John F. Kennedy to volunteer her services as an American astronaut. In honor of her extensive aviation experience, the president wrote her a courteous reply.

Kunz died at home in Auburn, California in 1967.
