= Velta Benn =

American pilot

Velta Snyder Haney Benn
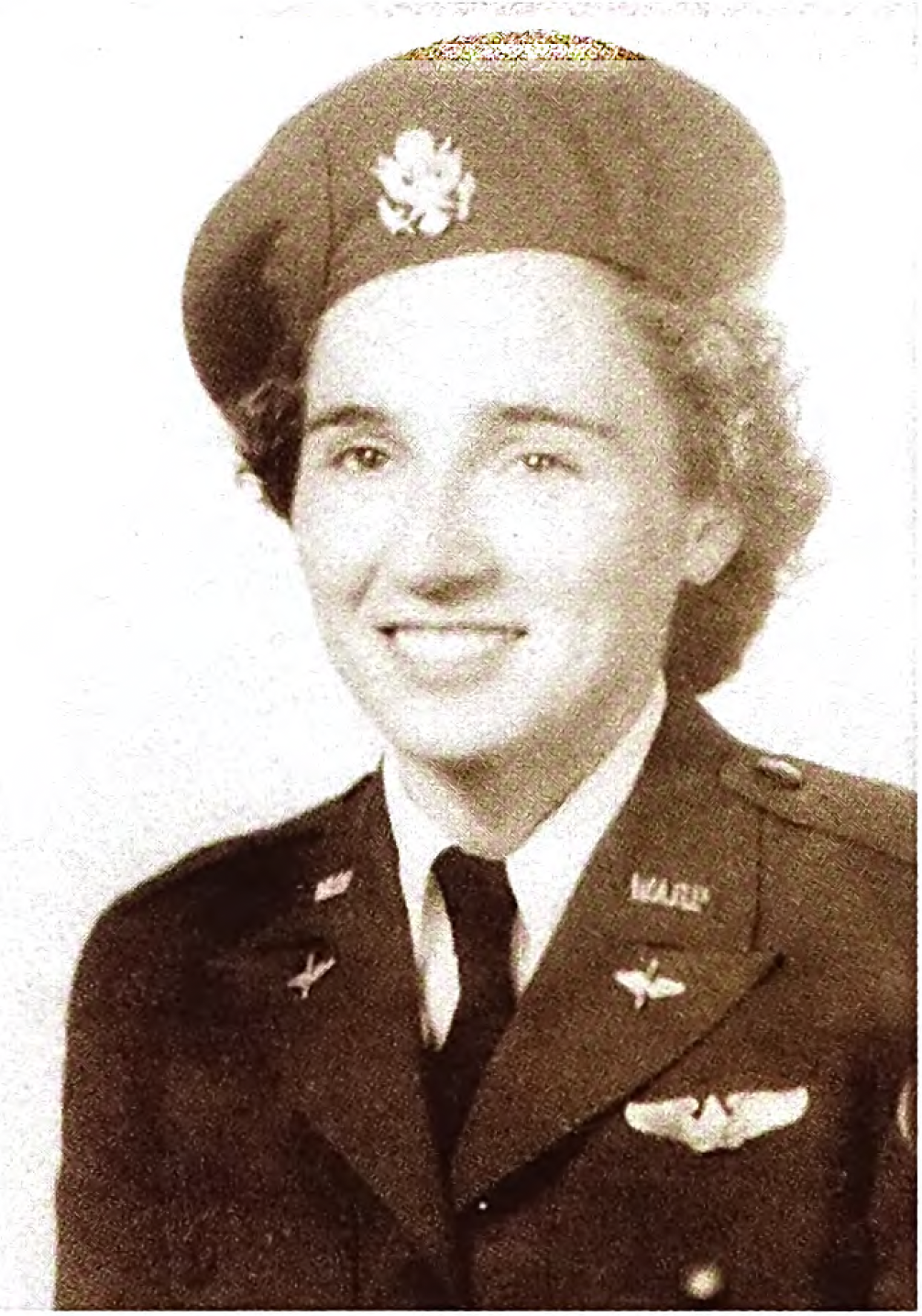
- Born: June 12, 1917; Vienna, Virginia
- Died: December 1, 2010 (aged 93); Alexandria, Virginia
- Occupation: Pilot
- Military career
- Allegiance: United States
- Branch: United States Army Air Forces
- Service years: 1944
- Unit: Women's Airforce Service Pilots

Velta Benn (June 12, 1917 – December 1, 2010) was a lifelong pilot who first flew in the Women's Airforce Service Pilots program. Across her career, she logged 55,000 hours of flight time over 63 years. She was the first woman to land a military jet on a Navy aircraft carrier.

== Biography ==
Benn was born on June 12, 1917, in Vienna, Virginia. In response for a call for pilots during World War II, Benn joined the Women Airforce Service Pilots (WASP) program in 1944. She trained for seven months at Avenger Field in Sweetwater, Texas, graduating on September 8, 1944. She was stationed at Merced Army Air Field where she flew pilots and planes around the country. Benn flew training missions in both At-6s and BT-13s.

After the WASP program was disbanded, Benn taught as a military flight instructor and also worked for a company producing aviation training films. Benn was the first woman to land a military jet on a Navy aircraft carrier. She taught safety classes for the Aircraft Owners and Pilots Association, becoming the first woman to do so in 1968. She was once asked by Pat Nixon for flying lessons before the request was turned down by White House security. Across her career, she logged 55,000 hours of flight time over 63 years.

In 1977, Benn flew a Stearman from Washington, D.C., to Teterboro Airport in New Jersey in support of legislation to grant military veterans benefits to WASP members like herself. She cited the fact that despite taking a military oath at the time, women pilots were still paid less than their male counterparts.

Benn died on December 1, 2010, in Alexandria, Virginia.

== Honors and legacy ==
Benn was inducted into the Virginia Aviation Hall of Fame in 1983 and the National Aviation Hall of Fame in 2023. She was awarded the Amelia Earhart Scholarship by the Ninety-Nines: International Organization of Women Pilots. She was also named Flight Instructor of the Year by the Federal Aviation Administration.
