= John Owen Donaldson =

American World War I flying ace

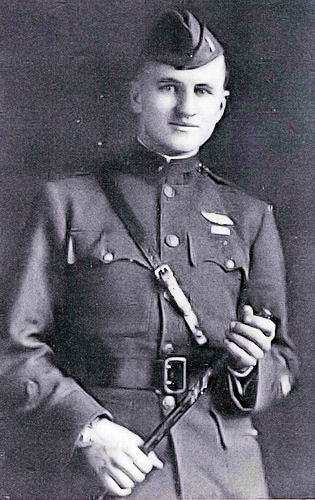
- John Owen Donaldson, 1918
- Born: April 14, 1897; Fort Yates, North Dakota, USA
- Died: September 7, 1930 (aged 33); Philadelphia, Pennsylvania, USA
- Military career
- Allegiance: United States
- Branch: Royal Air Force (United Kingdom)
- Service years: 1917–1918
- Rank: Captain
- Unit: Royal Air Force: No. 32 Squadron RAF
- Conflicts: World War I
- Awards: Distinguished Service Cross, British Distinguished Flying Cross, Belgian Croix de Guerre, Mackay Gold Medal

Captain John Owen Donaldson (May 14, 1897 – September 7, 1930) was a World War I flying ace credited with seven aerial victories.

== Early life ==
Donaldson was born in Fort Yates, North Dakota, the son of General Thomas Quinton Donaldson. He left Cornell and joined the Royal Flying Corps in Canada in March 1917.

== World War I ==
When the U.S. declared war, he transferred to the American air service. He was attached to the RAF (successor to the RFC), and posted to No. 32 Squadron RAF. From July 22 through August 29, 1918, he destroyed four Fokker D.VII fighters and drove down three others out of control.

On September 1, he was shot down by Theodor Quandt and captured. The following day, he and another prisoner escaped and tried to steal a German two-seater for a flying exit. Donaldson received a bayonet wound in the back while struggling with a sentry, and the refugee duo fled. On September 9, they were caught swimming a stream in no man's land, and re-incarcerated. Three days later, Donaldson, his companion, and three other POWs escaped; Donaldson made it to the Netherlands in October.

== Post-war ==
On 15 March 1920, Aerial Age Weekly reported that "Captain J. O. Donaldson, A.S.A., is now commanding the famous 94th Aero Squadron in place of the late Captain Field E. Kindley, A.S.A. Captain Donaldson is a military aviator with several decorations, and as squadron engineer officer for the 95th Squadron has shown himself an efficient and capable officer."

Donaldson won the U.S. transcontinental air race in October 1919, and was awarded the Mackay Gold Medal. He resigned his commission in 1920. He became president of Newark Air Service in New Jersey while continuing to be an air racer.

== Death ==
He crashed while stunting near Philadelphia, Pennsylvania, on September 7, 1930, in an airplane borrowed from Opal Kunz. After tail-spinning in to impact, he was pulled from the wreckage with a fractured skull and internal injuries. One newspaper account of the crash said: "The ship in which he crashed was the Travel-Air Whirlwind in which Mrs. Opal Kunz won the 25 mile free for all race on Saturday and which she had piloted to third place in the National Air Races in Chicago ten days ago. The airplane was completely demolished. The tremendous force of the crash telescoped the fuselage and snapped off the tail of the machine… Captain Donaldson was alive when Police Captain Brehan rushed across the field in a police car to his side. He was closely followed by Police Captain Dunn. Mrs. Kunz, a pupil of the pilot, also hurried across the field and helped in the extrication of his broken body… Vernie E. Moon of Maplewood, N.J., mechanican [sic] for Captain Donaldson, and who had been with him when he entered the plane for this aerobatic contest, was [also present] at the hospital."

== Honors and awards ==
Distinguished Service Cross (DSC)

The Distinguished Service Cross is presented to John Owen Donaldson, Second Lieutenant (Air Service), U.S. Army, for extraordinary heroism in action near Mont-Notre-Dame, France, July 22, 1918, when, on patrol, he attacked a formation of 20 Fokker enemy biplanes. Singling out one of the hostile machines Lieutenant Donaldson engaged it from behind, firing a short burst at close range, the plane bursting into flames and crashing to the ground. On August 8, 1918, he engaged 5 enemy scout planes over Licourt, France; singling out one and diving on it, he opened fire at close range, causing it to crash to the ground. On August 9, 1918, over Licourt, France, observing a British plane being attacked by three enemy scout planes, he immediately engaged one of the enemy, firing a long burst at very close range, the enemy plane bursting into flames and crashing to the ground. On August 25, 1918, over Hancourt, France, he attacked four Fokker enemy planes, diving into their midst and firing a short burst at one of them from a short range, destroying the plane, the pilot of which descended to safety in a parachute. On July 25, 1918, over Fismes, France, he drove down out of control an enemy Fokker plane; on August 10, over Perrone, France, one Fokker biplane; and on August 29 over Cambria, France, one Fokker biplane. In all these engagements Lieutenant Donaldson displayed the greatest devotion to duty and gallantry in the face of the enemy. (General Orders No. 13, W.D., 1924)

Distinguished Flying Cross (DFC)

For gallantry. On July 22, 1918, Lt. Donaldson, when on a patrol, attacked a formation of 20 Fokker biplanes over Mont-Notre-Dame. He singled out one of the hostile machines and engaged it from behind, firing a short burst at close range. The EA side-slipped to the right and then to the left, finally bursting into flames and crashing. On August 8, he engaged five enemy scouts over Licourt. He singled out one and diving on it from behind, opened fire at very close range. The EA immediately went into a straight dive and crashed into the ground between Licourt and Morchain, becoming a total wreck. On August 9, he observed a British machine being attacked by three hostile scouts over Licourt. He immediately flew to the scene of the encounter and engaged one of the EA, firing a long burst at very close range. Almost at once a white stream of escaping petrol was observed and a little later the EA burst into flames. On August 25, he attacked, single handed, four Fokker biplanes over Hancourt, diving into their midst and firing a short burst into one machine at close range. The EA went down in a side-slip dive and having fallen about 2,000 feet the left wing broke off. The pilot descended in a parachute and shortly after leaving the machine the other wing was observed to crumple up. In addition to the above this officer has driven down out of control three enemy machines as follows: July 25, 1918, one Fokker biplane over Fismes; August 10,, one Fokker biplane over Péronne; August 29,, one Fokker biplane over Cambrai. 2nd Lt. Donaldson also did magnificent work attacking ground targets with machine gun fire and bombs during the recent retreat on the Somme in August. He invariably showed the greatest devotion to duty and gallantry in the face of the enemy. (Supplement to the London Gazette)

== See also ==
- List of kidnappings (1900–1929)
- List of solved missing person cases (pre-1950)
- List of World War I flying aces from the United States

== Bibliography ==
- Norman Franks American Aces of World War 1 illustrated by Harry Dempsey. Osprey Publishing, 2001. ISBN 1-84176-375-6, ISBN 978-1-84176-375-0.
- Over the Front: The Complete Record of the Fighter Aces and Units of the United States and French Air Services, 1914-1918. Norman Franks, Frank Bailey. Grub Street Publishing, 2008. ISBN 0948817542ISBN 978-0948817540
- "Donaldson, John Owen". The National Cyclopædia of American Biography. 24: 226. 1935.
- Hudson, Dr. James J. (1986). "Lieutenant John O. Donaldson: World War I Air Ace and Escape Artist". Air University Review. 37 (2). Department of the Air Force: 88–92.
- John O. Donaldson Correspondence, 1917-1919 - Furman University Special Collection
