= Marge Hurlburt =

American aviator

- Hurlburt at the Halle Trophy Race in 1946
- Born: Margaret M. Hurlburt; December 30, 1914; Painesville, Ohio, U.S.
- Died: July 4, 1947 (aged 32); Decorah, Iowa, U.S.
- Cause of death: aircraft crash
- Education: Bowling Green State University
- Known for: setting women's air speed record
- Aviation career

Racing career
- Best position: 1st place, Halle Trophy Race, 1946
- Aircraft: AT-6

Marge Hurlburt (December 30, 1914 – July 4, 1947) was an American aviator who flew with the Women Airforce Service Pilots (WASP) during World War II and set a women's international air speed record in 1947.

== Biography ==
Margaret M. "Marge" Hurlburt was born and lived in Painesville, Ohio. She graduated from Bowling Green State University in 1938 and went on to teach school in Ohio. In the early 1940s, she took up flying at the airport in Willoughby, Ohio.

The pioneering aviator Jacqueline Cochran recruited her into the Women's Air Service Pilots (WASP) in 1943. Between 1943 and 1945, she ferried aircraft around the country and towed targets for gunners, flying C-60s, B-24s, and B-17s.

After the war, she obtained her rating as a flight instructor and worked at the Willoughby airfield, where she began learning aerobatics in the AT-6 aircraft. Not long afterwards, she won the top prize at the women's Halle Trophy Race at the Cleveland Air Races.

In 1947, Hurlburt set a new international women's flight-speed record of 337 miles per hour, besting the previous women's record of 292.27 mph set by Cochran a decade earlier. She set the record in a loaned FG-1 Corsair. Following her record-setting flight, the media dubbed her "Queen of the Air".

During this period, she served on the board of directors of the Professional Race Pilots Association, representing the interests of female pilots.

That same year, she joined the Flying Tigers aerial circus to raise money for a midget racer she was designing known as the "Hurlburt Hurricane". Only a few days later, she was taking part in an air show at Decorah, Iowa, in a borrowed AT-6, when her aircraft crashed during a slow roll, killing her instantly. The International Women's Air & Space Museum holds some artifacts from her life.
