= Janet Zaph Briggs =

American metallurgist

- Janet Zaph Briggs
- Born: February 7, 1912; Santa Ana, California
- Died: January 25, 1974 (aged 61); Tokyo
- Occupation: Metallurgist
- Honours: National Mining Hall of Fame (1989)

Janet Zaph Briggs (February 7, 1912 – January 25, 1974) was an American metallurgist, the first woman to earn a mining engineering degree from Stanford University, and an expert on molybdenum. She was inducted into the National Mining Hall of Fame in 1989.

== Early life ==
Janet Zaph Briggs was born in Santa Ana, California, the daughter of George S. Briggs and Eva Potts Briggs. She attended Stanford University, where she was vice president of the aviation club, and learned to fly while earning degrees in mining engineering in 1931 and 1933. Her master's thesis at Stanford was titled "A Short Study of the Making, Working, and Properties of Ancient Iron." She completed doctoral studies at the University of Leoben in Austria.

In 1933 Stanford University published her work titled The Microcharacter as a Metallurgical Instrument ...

== Career ==
As a metallurgist, she worked first for Crucible Steel Company, beginning in 1936, and later for Climax Molybdenum Company, rising to the rank of vice president for technical information in 1970. She coauthored Molybdenum: Steels, Irons, Alloys in 1948, and Mo: Less Common Alloys of Molybdenum in 1962. She received a patent in 1945 for a process of making hardened steel.

As an amateur aviator, Janet Zaph Briggs earned her private pilot's license in 1930, and was one of the nine charter members of the Bay Cities chapter of the Ninety-Nines.

== Personal life and legacy ==
Janet Zaph Briggs lived in New York City, but died while on business in Tokyo in 1974, age 61. Her gravesite is next to those of her parents, in Santa Ana, California.

Climax Molybdenum published a biography of Briggs soon after her death. In 1989, Janet Briggs was inducted into the National Mining Hall of Fame in Leadville, Colorado. In 1974, she was also posthumously awarded a fourth class Order of the Sacred Treasure by the Emperor of Japan for her contributions to the Japanese steel industry.
