= Penny Thompson =

American aviator and air race-show promoter from the 1940s

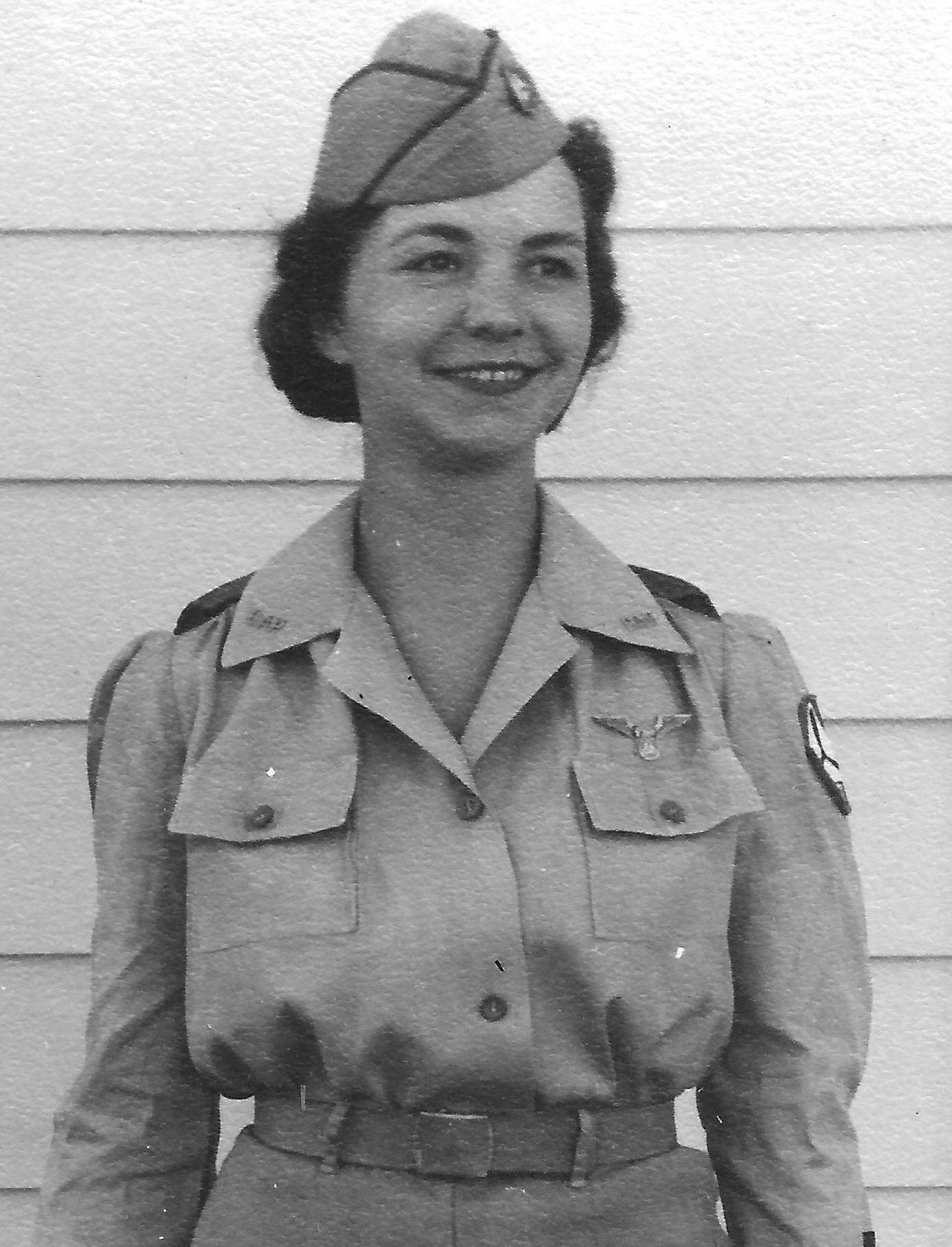
- Thompson in civil air patrol uniform, 1944
- Born: October 17, 1917; Sylvania, Georgia
- Died: September 22, 1975 (aged 57); Miami, Florida
- Monuments: [Larry and Penny Thompson Memorial Park] ([Miami-Dade County], Florida)
- Known for: American aviator; promoter of women's intercontinental air race-shows; publisher-editor for Southeast Aviation News; founder of Miami-Dade Mother's of Twins Club and Twins Easter Parade
- Awards: Florida Aviation Hall of Fame; Bertram Trophy Race 1946; Florida Women’s Hall of Fame

Gladys "Penny" Thompson (October 17, 1917 – September 22, 1975) was an American aviator and women's intercontinental air race-air show promoter and aviation publisher-editor during the 1940s and early 1950s. In 1953, she married Miami Herald humor columnist Larry Thompson, and for 20 years until his death, she was featured often in his daily column, "Life With Larry Thompson" and in three books he authored. She founded the Miami-Dade Mother's of Twins Club and the Twins Easter Parade.

== Early years ==
Born Gladys Rhodes, Penny Thompson watched planes fly over her family's farm in Sylvania, Georgia, as a young girl. This, along with her admiration for famed aviator Amelia Earhart, inspired her to fly. After getting her private pilot's license in 1936, she moved to Miami, Florida, where the aviation industry was burgeoning. She published and edited an aviation newspaper, Southeastern Aviation News from 1945-1950.

== Civil Air Patrol ==
During World War II, she joined the Civil Air Patrol as a volunteer and flew over the Gulf of Mexico searching for German submarines that were attacking Allied merchant ships. Her plane was destroyed in a fire on September 15, 1945, along with several hundred U.S. Navy aircraft and civilian planes battened down in giant wooden hangars at the Naval Air Station Richmond south of Miami in preparation for a major hurricane. Today, the Larry and Penny Thompson Memorial Park is located on the same property that originally encompassed the Naval Air Station.

== Ninety-Nines ==
In 1946 she won the Bertram Trophy Race sponsored by the Ninety-Nines, the women's pilot organization started by Earhart, at the Florida Air Pilots Association Meet in Orlando, Florida. That same year Penny was elected vice chairman of the Florida chapter of the Ninety-Nines and chairman in 1947. Later in 1947, she led the drive to name the Miami Municipal Airport the Amelia Earhart Field, to honor the aviator who began her around-the-world flight from that field in 1937, disappearing over the Pacific Ocean.

== World's First All-Woman Air Show ==
Following World War II, the annual All-American Air Maneuvers aviation event resumed in 1946 at Coast Guard Air Station Miami. The next year, women fliers were told they couldn't participate; so the women of the Florida Ninety-Nines organized their own air show at Tampa, Florida's Peter O. Knight Airport. Penny was selected as the general chairman of the world's first All-Woman Air Show, held March 15–16, 1947. It included a transcontinental air race from Palm Springs, California to Tampa. Proceeds were used to help young women obtain advanced aviation training through the Amelia Earhart Scholarship Fund. The event raised awareness of women in aviation and "prompted air derbies and air marking parties throughout the U.S. The tradition of annual women's air races was begun". Penny played a role during this period in helping to elevate women in the male-dominated world of aviation and getting women fliers back into the men's All-American Air Maneuvers the next year, in large part due to the success of the 1947 All-Woman Air Show. In 1948, Penny also helped organize and promote the 2nd Annual All-Woman Air Show held June 4–6 at the Amelia Earhart Field in Miami, along with another transcontinental air race for female pilots, again raising money for the women's scholarship fund. The festivities culminated with the women fliers taking off from Key West, Florida for Havana, Cuba, 90 miles away, to continue their public relations efforts of promoting women in aviation.

== Flying car ==
In 1949 Penny and Ellen Gilmore flew an experimental "flying car" called the Roadable Ercoupe, as part of the Montreal-Miami All-Woman's Air Race, which culminated with the 3rd Annual All-Woman Air Show of the World in West Palm Beach, Florida. Landing in Jacksonville, Florida, they folded up the wings at sunset and drove on A1A the rest of the way to Daytona Beach, Florida, at night, then flew the rest of the way to Miami after daybreak. While they didn't win any prizes because the rules stated flying had to be during the day, their goal of obtaining national publicity for women pilots in general and the women's air show in particular, was successful., Their trip was featured in the nationally syndicated Smilin' Jack aviation comic strip by Zack Mosley with "Miss Penny-Ellen" drawn on the comic strips's flying car. As a sign of the times, the character Smilin' Jack said, "This generation of girls has migrated from the kitchen to the cockpit!" as he watched Penny and Ellen take off in their flying car.

== Life with Larry Thompson ==
Several years later, Penny was interviewed by humorist Larry Thompson and reporter for the Miami Herald, who was doing a story on women in aviation. On February 13, 1953 they married. About that time, he was promoted to writing a daily humor column for the Herald and for the next 20 years until his death in 1973, Penny was thrust into the public spotlight as an integral part of the column, "Life With Larry Thompson" and in three books authored by Larry. He never used her name in his writings, simply referring to her as my "good wife." Along with the rest of the family, Penny was often depicted in a comic strip that occasionally accompanied the column on the weekends.

== Mothers of Twins Club; Annual Twins Easter Parade ==
On April 1, 1954, Penny had twins, Carl and Evellen, and the story ran on the front page of the Herald. The next year, Penny invited all the twins in Florida to come to the first birthday party for her own twins. More than 200 twins showed up. Life Magazine covered the event with a three-page photo spread and story. That year Penny started the Miami-Dade County Mother's of Twins Club as a support group for mothers of twins and multiple births. In 1956, instead of a birthday party, she threw a parade for her twins. Called the Twin's Easter Parade, it became an annual event for about two decades until Penny's death in 1975. The parade, which received national publicity each year, featured hundreds of twins parading through downtown Miami on Easter Sunday with celebrity parade marshals such as singer Paul Anka and the Wrigley Doublemint Twins.

== Later years; death ==
Following Larry's death in 1973, Penny spoke at numerous tree planting ceremonies throughout Miami-Dade County to honor her husband's love of trees and nature. Two years later, she died from acute leukemia at age 57. She was honored posthumously with her late husband when Miami-Dade County dedicated the largest park and campground in their honor in 1977, the Larry and Penny Thompson Memorial Park.
