= National Mining Hall of Fame =

Museum in Colorado, US

Coordinates: 39.2512°N 106.2941°W

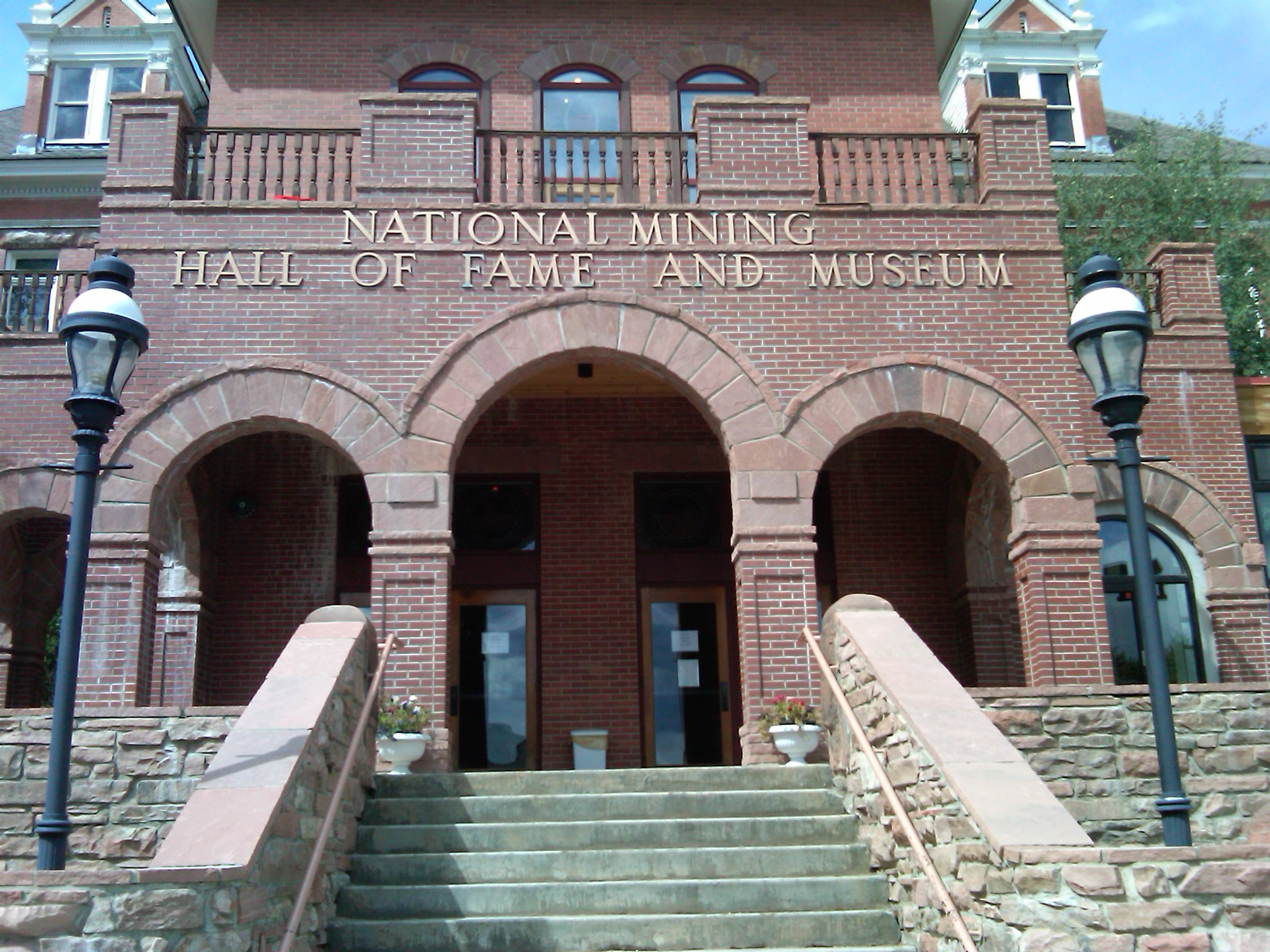
- National Mining Hall of Fame and Museum Entrance
- Established: 1977
- Location: 120 West 9th Street, Leadville, Colorado
- Website: www.mininghalloffame.org

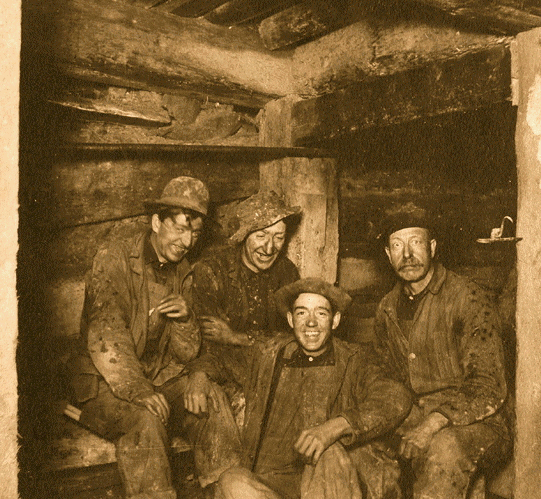
Miners on break underground, Leadville, circa 1900.

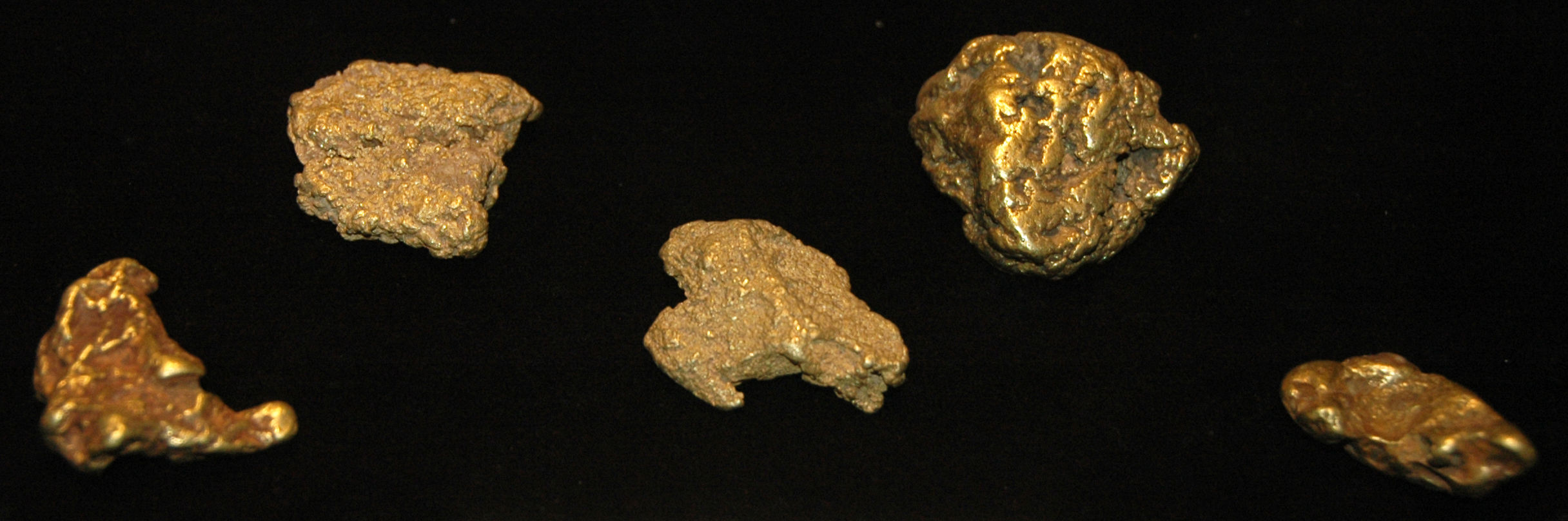
Display of placer gold from near Fairplay, Colorado, at the Leadville Mining Museum.

The National Mining Hall of Fame is a museum located in Leadville, Colorado, United States, dedicated to commemorating the work of miners and people who work with natural resources. The museum also participates in efforts to inform the public about the mining industry.

The National Mining Hall of Fame and Museum is the only national mining museum with a Congressional charter, which was passed in a joint resolution (S.J.Res.192) of the second session of the 100th Congress of the United States of America and approved by President Ronald Reagan on November 14, 1988.

== History ==
The museum was incorporated in 1987, and it was to be built on land owned by the Colorado School of Mines in Golden. As the building was to be built, the town of Leadville was facing hard times.

With the closure of mines in Leadville in the 1980s, some possible contributors withdrew their contributions. After the chairman of the project, Doug Watrous, asked Richard Moolick, another board director, to negotiate with the city of Leadville, he came back with the offer. Moolick said they offered $0.50 a year for a 110-year lease. But the museum still needed money, so Joe Shoemaker, a former state senator, suggested that the museum seek 100 contributors that would donate $1,000.00 each.

It took one year, but the museum was able to raise all the money. In 1988, the museum moved to a building that was the former Leadville Junior High School and before that the Leadville High School.

== Museum exhibits ==
The museum occupies 25,000 square feet (2,300 m^{2}). Major exhibits include an elaborate model railroad, a walk-through replica of an underground hardrock mine, the Gold Rush room, with many specimens of native gold, a large collection of mineral specimens, a mining art gallery and a gift shop.

The National Mining Hall of Fame and Museum is a federally chartered memorial for men and women who have achieved lasting greatness in the mining industry and related fields. Inductees to the National Mining Hall of Fame are selected by the museum's board of governors. A candidate must have made significant contributions to the American mining scene. Consideration is given to prospectors, miners, mining leaders, engineers, teachers, financiers, inventors, journalists, rascals, geologists and others.

Notable honorees include Georgius Agricola, Janet Zaph Briggs, Gertrude Selma Sober, Meyer Guggenheim, Herbert Hoover, James M. Hyde, Ed Schieffelin, Harrison Schmitt, Paddy Martinez, Horace Tabor, Fred Chester Bond and Edmund J. Longyear, founder of Boart Longyear.

The Hall of Fame is criticized by James Loewen in his book Lies Across America for over emphasis on scientists, mining executives, and owners of vast mining properties. He states that "Only fourteen people - 12 percent of the total - represent individual miners, prospectors and explorers, politicians, labor leaders, philanthropists, and all others." The people commemorated are predominantly white Anglo-Saxon Protestant men, while historically mining has been one of America's most multicultural occupations. Loewen also criticizes the museum for its lack of any kind of memorial dedicated to the thousands and thousands who have lost their lives laboring in the coal mines.

Social, labor, safety, and environmental issues related to coal mining are now explored in "Buried Sunlight: Coal Mining in America," an exhibit that opened in 2017.
