= Trinity Episcopal Church (Atchison, Kansas) =

Historic church in Kansas, United States

- U.S. National Register of Historic Places
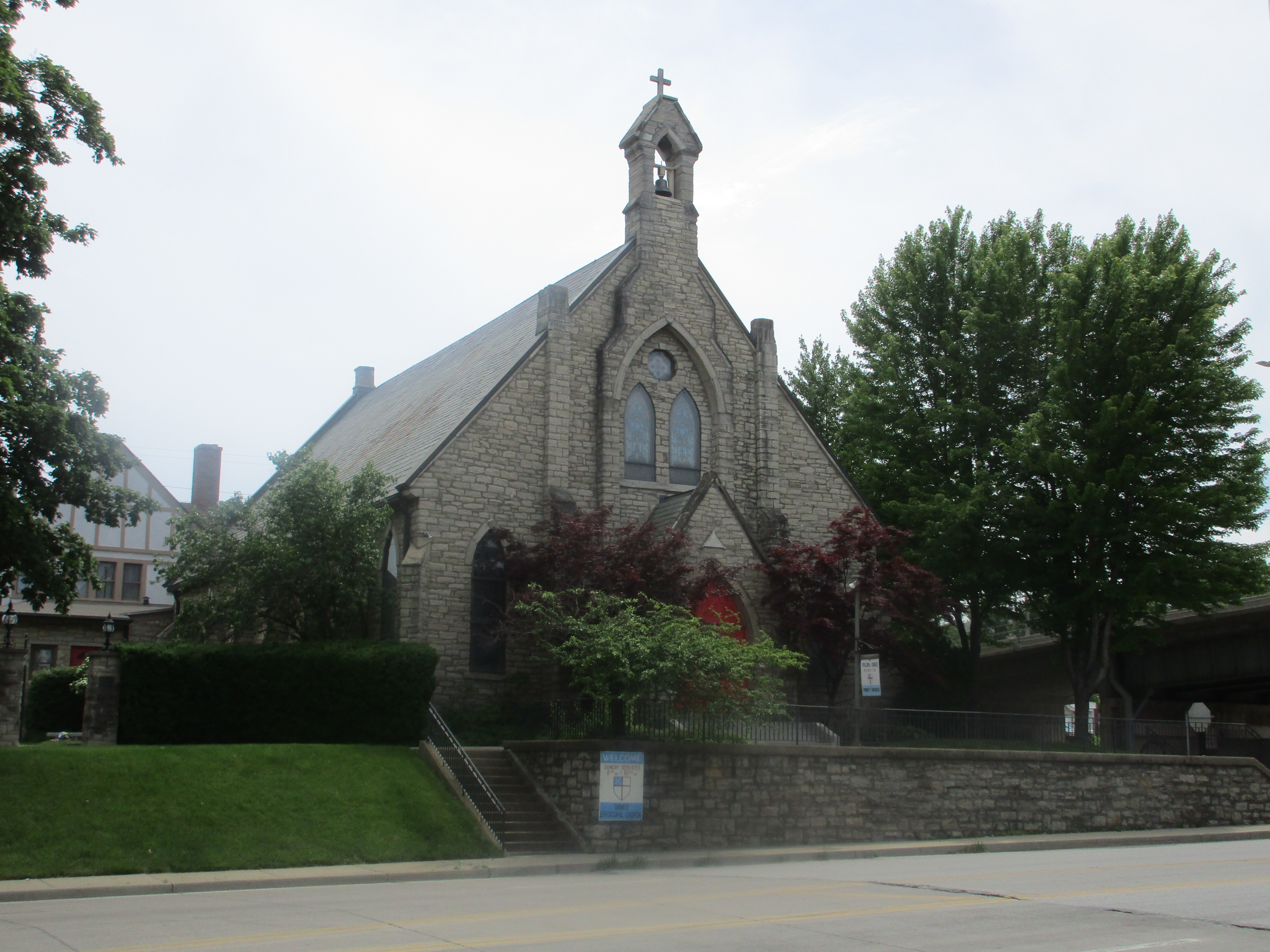

- Location within Kansas Location within the United States
- Location: 300 S. 5th St., Atchison, Kansas
- Coordinates: 39°33′33″N 95°7′6″W
- Built: 1866
- Architect: James C. Sidney
- NRHP reference No.: 85000692
- Added to NRHP: April 4, 1985

Trinity Episcopal Church is a historic Episcopal church in Atchison, Kansas, United States. It is a parish of the Episcopal Diocese of Kansas. The church's rector is the Rev. Jon Hullinger.

In 2015, the church reported 91 members; in 2023, it reported 105 members. No membership statistics were reported in 2024 national parochial reports. Plate and pledge financial support reported by the church in 2024 was $93,512. Average Sunday Attendance (ASA) reported in 2024 was 32 persons. This was a relative decrease from ASA of 44 reported in 2019.

== History and building ==
The church building was constructed in 1866. Aviator Amelia Earhart was baptized in the church in 1897 and attended the church as a child. She was born nearby in the Amelia Earhart Birthplace. The building was listed on the National Register of Historic Places in 1985.
