= Carol Rabadi =

Jordanian airline pilot (born 1977)

- Born: December 14, 1977 (age 48); Amman, Jordan
- Education: Embry–Riddle Aeronautical University
- Aviation career
- Famous flights: Captain of the first all arab female flight crew for Royal Jordanian
- Rank: B787 Captain and Quality Manager

Carol Rabadi is a Jordanian airline pilot, one of the first for Royal Jordanian. In 2009, she was the Captain of the first all Arab female flight crew on a Royal Jordanian flight. Carol was a Line instructor, a simulator Instructor and a line check Captain on the A320 aircraft. She has now moved on to the B787 wide bodied aircraft, as well as being appointed as the Director of Corporate Quality Management Department in Royal Jordanian Airlines.

== Career ==
Carol Rabadi decided to pursue a career in aviation as a child, when she flew in a jump seat on board a flight from Cyprus back to Jordan. She attended Embry–Riddle Aeronautical University in Daytona Beach, Florida where she earned a Bachelor's degree in aeronautical science. She joined airline Royal Jordanian in 1999, two months after graduating. In 2009 she became the second Female Captain in the history of Jordan. Jordans first female Captain was Taghreed Akasheh in 1985.

Initially, Rabadi worked as part of the airline's ground crew for two years, which was typical of the airline's recruitment policy for cadet pilots at the time. Rabadi flew as a co-pilot for six years, flying on the Airbus A320 family and Airbus A340 type of aeroplanes. She was then able to Captain flights on planes in the Embraer E-Jet family. She flew her first flight of more than 100 passengers in October 2009 on a flight back from Athens, Greece. This flight was also the first time Royal Jordanian had flown with an all-female flight crew, something she has repeated on several occasions since. Rabadi is a member of the Arabian section of the Ninety-Nines, the international organisation of female pilots, which is led by fellow Royal Jordanian pilot Alia Twal.
