= Mary C. Alexander =

American aviation pioneer

- Born: March 2, 1893
- Died: April 16, 1955 (aged 62); Washington D.C.
- Other names: Mary C. White, Mary Alexander Held
- Occupation: aviatrix

Mary Charlotte Alexander (March 2, 1893 – April 16, 1955) was an American aviation pioneer, one of the first women to become a commercial pilot.

Alexander and her husband opened the J. I. Alexander Motor Company, a Studebaker dealership, in Lynchburg, Virginia 1924. Mary served as president and treasurer and her husband was general manager and salesman. She was one of the first women to be president of an automobile dealership in Virginia. The company did well and expanded in 1927. She took flying lessons in 1929, after her divorce, saying "she wanted to be able to add sales of airplanes to her Lynchburg automobile dealership," even though the business had closed or was closing. She started lessons at Roosevelt Field on Long Island, and graduated from the Curtiss Wright Flying School in Baltimore, Maryland, their first female graduate.

Alexander was one of the twenty-six charter members of the first association of women aviators, the Ninety-Nines, at a time when there were only 117 licensed women pilots in the United States. Alexander was outspoken in defense of women, especially mothers, who made the choice to pursue flying. She often combined her parenting with her flying, once hosting an "air party" for her daughter and her friends in 1930, flying them over the Gulf of Mexico. Amelia Earhart called her "The Flying Grandmother" in her book The Fun of It, and credited Alexander with promoting aviation as "a serious endeavor, rather than a dangerous novelty."

She was listed in the Lynchburg city directory as an aviatrix. She flew at air shows in her Moth open cockpit airplane, but was not a barnstormer. She earned her transport pilot's license in the early 1930s and used a Virginia National Guard airfield in Virginia Beach to start a regularly scheduled flight service to Washington, D.C., which lasted almost two years. In the late 1930s she was reporting on her activities with the Los Angeles Chapter of the Ninety-Nines, saying that she had left a job at Lockheed. By the end of the 1930s she had stopped flying and took a job with Pan American Airways.

She was a Virginia Women in History honoree from the Library of Virginia. She is on the National Air and Space Museum's Wall of Honor.

== Early life and education ==
Alexander was born Mary White to William White and Mary Ella (Ferguson) White. She stated that she had attended Immaculata Seminary in Washington, D.C. She married John Ira Alexander in Baltimore, Maryland, on November 28, 1911, the couple had two children and divorced in January 1929. She later married Emil Charles Held and they lived in the DC area, while she pursued an interest in art, teaching painting classes at the Federal Supply Offices in Washington, D.C. She died of "a heart ailment" in Washington, D.C., on April 16, 1955. Since her husband served in World War I, she was buried in Arlington National Cemetery.
