= Hurlburt Hurricane =

Hurricane

General information
- National origin: United States
- Designer: Marge Hurlburt, Anna Logan, and Duke Caldwell
- Number built: 1

The Hurlburt Hurricane, also known as the Camburn Special, is a midget-class racing plane designed in the mid 1940s by aviators Marge Hurlburt, Anna Logan, and Duke Caldwell, all former members of the Women Airforce Service Pilots (WASP).

When WASP was disbanded after World War II, former WASP aviator Marge Hurlburt took up air racing, becoming interested in a new midget class of racing airplanes that had first been proposed before the war: these would be smaller, lighter, and cheaper to build than those then in use and thus suitable for civilian pilots and homebuilders to build and fly.

Together with fellow WASP aviators Anna Logan and Duke Caldwell, she formed a consortium to design and build such a plane, which required a stock 85 hp (63 kW) engine, fixed pitched propeller, and non-retractable landing gear. Known ultimately as the "Hurlburt Hurricane", their design was powered by an 85 hp (63 kW) Continental C85 engine. It was sponsored by the Goodyear Tire and Rubber Company, Continental Motors, and Kendall Motor Oil. The trio moved to Michigan, where the plane was being built, to supervise and to put on the plane's covering themselves. Its registration number was NX1223, with the 'X' designating it as an experimental aircraft.

Given entry number 85 in the 1947 Goodyear Trophy Race, a 2.2 mi (3.5 km) course for midget racers, the trio hoped for Hurlburt to pilot the plane, but she was killed prior to the race when her aircraft crashed at an air show in Iowa. Neither of the other members of the trio was ultimately able to take over because the race remained restricted to male pilots. The Hurlburt Hurricane thus flew with Joe Smith as pilot and was eliminated in the heats.

A group of pilots and aviation enthusiasts has formed to make the Hurlburt Hurricane airworthy again. Peanut-scale models of the Hurlburt Hurricane have been built from plans drawn by Dave Livesay.
