= Halle Trophy Race =

Boat race

The Halle Trophy Race, later briefly renamed the Kendall Trophy Race, was an air race for women aviators that ran for a few years after World War II.

== History ==
Inaugurated in 1946, the Halle Trophy Race took place in Cleveland, Ohio, and was named after one of its sponsors, an upscale Cleveland department store. It was one of many events at the National Air Races in Cleveland and the only one limited to women aviators. In the 1946 race, the five women flyers who competed for the first trophy were photographed for Life magazine. The first winner was Marge Hurlburt, who would go on to set a women's air speed record the following year.

The course for the Halle Trophy Race was five laps around a 15-mile course, or 75 miles altogether. The women who flew in the race were limited to modified versions of the North American T-6 Texan, an advanced single-engine plane that had been used to train U.S. pilots during World War II. Preferred models included the AT-6 and the SNJ. Many of the women who took part in this race were veterans of the Women's Air Service Pilots (WASP).

Halle sponsored the race in 1946 and 1947. Kendall Oil then took over as sponsor of the race, which was renamed the Kendall Trophy Race for 1948 (not to be confused with a men's race of the same name that had been run in 1947).

In 1949, no sponsor could be found, so that year the race was called simply the Women's Trophy Race. The group managing the air races put up a $5,500 purse. New rules were also inaugurated that year, stating that the planes had to keep their stock engines and that wings could not be clipped. Grace Harris won for the second year in a row, but at a much slower speed than in 1948.

In 1950, all of the Cleveland races went on hiatus due to the outbreak of the Korean War, and the women's trophy race went defunct.

== Winners ==
- 1946 Marge Hurlburt (200.59 mph)
- 1947 Ruth Johnson (223.4 mph)
- 1948 Grace Harris (234.96 mph)
- 1949 Grace Harris (216.67 mph)

== See also ==
- Dot Lemon
