= Hermelinda Urvina =

Ecuadorian pilot (1905–2008)

Hermelinda Urvina Mayorga
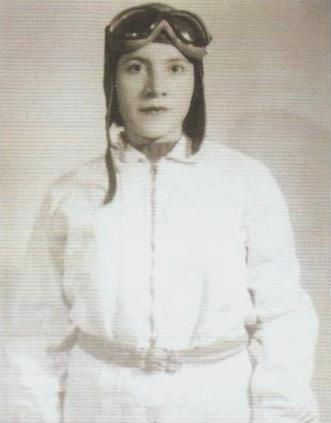
- Hermelinda Urvina in 1932
- Born: 26 September 1905; Ambato, Ecuador
- Died: 20 September 2008 (aged 102); Toronto, Canada
- Occupation: airplane pilot
- Known for: First Ecuadorian woman to obtain a pilot's license

Hermelinda Urvina Mayorga (26 September 1905 – 20 September 2008) was an Ecuadorian pilot. She was the first Ecuadorian woman to obtain a pilot's license, issued in the United States in 1932.

== Personal life ==
Urvina was born to José Belisario Urvina and Felicidad Mayorga in the city of Ambato, Ecuador on 26 September 1905. In 1926, she married Rosendo Briones and moved to New York City. She lived in New York from 1945 to 1989, and then moved back to Ecuador until her husband died in 1989. In 1999, she moved to Toronto, Canada to live with one of her daughters. She died in Toronto on 20 September 2008, six days before her 103rd birthday.

== Aviation career ==
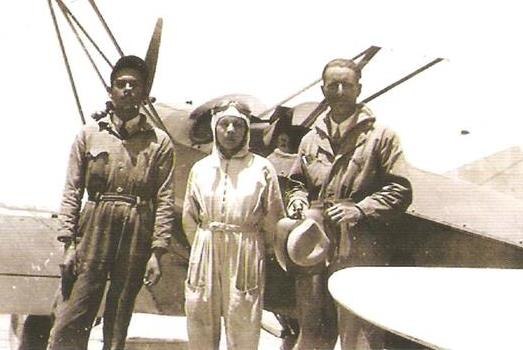
Hermelinda Urvina 03

In 1932, while living in the US, Hermelinda Urvina earned her pilot's license, becoming the first South American woman to do so.

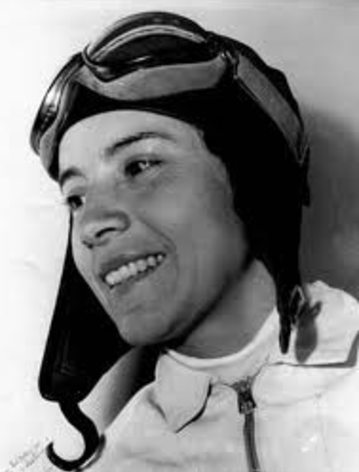
Hermelinda Urvina 02

She was an early member of the Ninety-Nines, an international organization for women pilots.

== Recognition ==
In 2000, she was recognized by the Ecuadorian newspaper El Comercio as one of the ten most influential women of the millennium.

Arachnologists named an Ecuadorian tarantula, Pamphobeteus urvinae Sherwood et al., 2022, in her honour.
