= Jane Straughan =

American aviator

- Born: Jane Sincell Straughan; August 24, 1913; Washington, D.C.
- Died: March 12, 2007 (aged 93); Berlin, Maryland

Jane Sincell Straughan (August 24, 1913 – March 12, 2007) was an American aviator known for her contribution as a Women Airforce Service Pilot from 1942 to 1944. She remained active in aviation throughout her life, serving on the Civil Aeronautics Board and being a captain in the Air Force Reserve.

== Childhood ==
Jane Sincell Straughan was born on August 24, 1913, in Washington, D.C. She was the daughter of Charles William Sincell and Wilhelmina Sincell.

At the age of two Straughan's mother died and Charles William Sincell was left to raise the family, which included her and her two older brothers. Her entire childhood was spent in Washington, D.C. Her interest in flying developed after dating her future husband, Al Straughan, but other than her husband she had stated, "The family just thought I was a little crazy. They didn't think it was a good idea."

== Education ==
Straughan was a graduate of Central High School, and was in her early twenties when she learned to fly her first plane at Queen's Chapel Airport in Hyattsville, Maryland. Straughan then earned her pilots license in 1938, and later joined a woman's flying group in Washington, D.C., known as the Ninety-Nines. In 1942 Straughan and members of the Ninety-Nines were asked to join the Women Air Force Service Pilots (WASP) class of 43-W-1 in Houston, Texas. After completing the course of instruction prescribed, Straughan graduated from this class on April 24, 1943. She then was assigned to her first air base, New Castle Army Air in Wilmington, Delaware where she remained until WASP was deactivated on December 20, 1944.

== Marriage and family ==
Jane Straughan's interest in flying and aviation began when she started dating her future husband, Alfred W. Straughan. They dated through the Great Depression and on June 12, 1937, they were married. Since their courtship and marriage were through the Depression, they had to decide how much they were willing to spend on learning to fly. The Straughans had to make a decision. "Neither of us could fly. I wanted to save for a small house. We made an agreement. I would solo and if I didn't like flying, we would buy a house. I soloed in 1938, and we bought a Cub." Straughan and her husband had twin sons, John W. "Jack" Straughan and Charles W. "Bill" Straughan.

== Aviation and WASP ==
Straughan's love for flying began when she and her husband bought a Cub. Before the two bought the plane, Jane was apprehensive. She wanted to save their money since the country was in a depression, but she eventually succumbed to the idea. Jane learned how to fly in a 40-horsepower Cub, the Silver Beauty. She trained at the Queen's Chapel Airport. In 1938, Jane received her flying license.

Straughan joined the Ninety-Nines, a women's flying group in Washington. Soon after, Jackie Cochran invited the Ninety-Nines to a cocktail party at the Mayflower Hotel. Jackie asked the women if they were willing to fly for the country. All the women agreed. About a month later, Straughan was wired to come to the Rice Hotel in Houston, Texas. Straughan thought one of the girls was playing a joke, however, Mary Lou Neale called Straughan asking if she were going. Straughan told Mary Lou she would not be going because she had just been assigned a sales manager position at the Engineering and Research Corporation. Then Straughan's husband decided he was going to volunteer as a service pilot and told her he might be stationed overseas. Therefore, Straughan decided to attend the meeting in Houston.

In November 1942, six girls of the Ninety-Nines reported to the Rice Hotel in Houston. Straughan tried to room at Oveta Culp Hobby's, charge of WAC (Women's Army Corps), but there was no room available at the Hobby house. Straughan stayed in a room across the street and dined at the Hobby home. The next place Straughan lived was a motel with some of the girls. Straughan claims it was "pretty bad". Finally, Straughan settled in a house with Marge Gray, Marion Mackey, Geri and Magda Tacke near the airport where the women were to train. These prospective Women Airforce Service Pilots joined 22 others at Ellington Army Air Field. BT, twin-engine Cessnas and AT-6 were used in training at the Houston field. Straughan became a part of class 43-W-1, the first class of WASP.

Straughan's first base was the New Castle Army Air Base in Wilmington, Delaware with the WAFS. Straughan remained here until the deactivation of WASP. Once, Jackie Cochran wanted Straughan to be sent to Camp Davis but Straughan refused to go to such a base. She had heard of the bad conditions of the base. At the New Castle Army Base, Straughan ferried between factories and bases. Her job was errand flying in PT-19 Fairchilds and P-47. In all of Straughan's experience as a WASP, she flew Piper Cubs, PT-19, PT-23, Vultee BTs, AT-6, AT-9, AT-17, C-60, C-61, P-24, P-39, P-40, P-47, P-51, and P-63.

In December 1944, WASP was deactivated on the verge of WASP militarization.

== Later years ==
After holding a position as an Aircraft Accident Analyst on the Civil Aeronautics Board in Washington, D.C., in her early thirties, Straughan moved on to the Social Security Administration (SSA). She was a Field Representative and worked there until she retired in 1981 at the age of 68 years. After working at the SSA for more than twenty years, she lived at Leisure World in Rossmoor, Maryland, and would visit Fenwick Island for her summer vacation. Keeping true to her roots, she continued to be involved with WASP and was also able to be a captain in the Air Force Reserve.

== Death ==
Straughan died at the age of 93 on March 12, 2007. She had been living at the Berlin Nursing and Rehabilitation Center in Maryland. Her husband, Alfred Straughan, and grandson, Scott Straughan, died before her in 1981 and 2003, respectively. She is survived by two sons—John and Charles Straughan, three grandchildren—Jason, Erin, and Paige Straughan, and one great-grandson—Jackson Straughan. Her service was held on March 24, 2007, at St. Matthews By-The-Sea in Fenwick Island, the church she attended while living. They also respected her with full military honors at her service.
