= Manila Davis Talley =

Manila Davis Talley (1898–1973) was the first woman from West Virginia to earn a pilot's license. She was a founding member of the Betsy Ross Air Corps, a private female auxiliary for the Army Air Corps, and the third woman to complete training at the Air Force War College.

== Early life and education ==
Talley was born Manila Carolyn Davis in Flatwoods, Braxton County, West Virginia. She attended West Virginia University and later transferred to the New England Conservatory to study piano and drama.

After becoming interested in aviation, Talley enrolled in a Curtiss-Wright mechanics course and attended the M.I.T. Guggenheim School of Aeronautics.

== Aviation and military career ==
Talley became saleswoman at the Curtiss-Wright Corporation in late 1929 or early 1930. She earned a commercial pilot’s license while working for the company making her the first woman from West Virginia to do so.

Talley was an airplane demonstrator and an aircraft racing pilot. She joined the 99s (International Association of Women Pilots) in 1930. In the same year, Talley became the first woman to complete the Army Air Corps officer reserve course.

Talley was a founding member of the Betsy Ross Air Corps, a private female auxiliary for the Army Air Corps that launched in 1931.

Manila married Benjamin B. Talley, an officer in the U. S. Army Corps of Engineers, in 1933. In 1941, she became the person to join the Anchorage, Alaska Civil Air Patrol eventually earning the rank of Lieutenant Colonel.

In 1967, Talley became the third woman to complete to obtain a certificate from the Air Force War College.

== Death and legacy ==
Manila Davis Talley died at Altus Air Force Base in Altus, Oklahoma on December 17, 1973. She is interred at Flatwoods Cemetery in West Virginia.

Talley's scrapbook, mostly consisting of materials from 1929-1942, is held in the National Air and Space Museum Archives. A collection of her papers dating from 1919 to 1990 was gifted to the University of Alaska Anchorage/Alaska Pacific University Consortium Library Archives in 1986.
