= Margaret Adams (pilot) =

Australian aviator

- Born: Margaret Kulka (Kentley); Sydney, Australia
- Known for: Forming the Australian Women's Flying Club

Margaret Adams (1915 – 8 October 1987) was an Australian aviator.

== Life ==
In 1938, Adams, who was from Sydney, was active in forming the Australian Women's Flying Club (AWFC). She was elected the inaugural president in September 1938. The club was intended as a social club for women pilots, and by 1939 the club had 300 members. Members underwent first aid courses, and studied aircraft engineering and navigation. They also made comforts, such as socks, for the Royal Australian Air Force. In 1940 the Women's Air Training Corps was formed and the clubs became part of that organisation.

In 1958, Adams, by then married and using her married name (Kentley) joined the international women pilots' organisation the Ninety-Nines. In 1960, she and Maie Casey received the charter for the Australian chapter of the organisation at a reception at the Royal Aero Club in London, England.

In April 1968, Adams and Anne Carter (a 22-year-old and Australian Woman Pilot of the Year) set out in a Cessna 182 to race a Morris 1100 driven by Jack Murray and Evan Green. The women, who flew only by day, while the men drove around the clock, reached the finish just nine hours and five minutes ahead. In 1973, she navigated a Cessna 172 flown by Marie Richardson to win the Sydney–Dubbo air race on handicap.
