= Ninety-Nines =

International organization of female pilots

The Ninety-Nines, Inc.
- Formation: November 2, 1929; 97 years ago
- Founded at: Valley Stream, New York, U.S.
- Type: International Organization of Women Pilots
- Headquarters: Oklahoma City, Oklahoma, U.S.
- Coordinates: 35.406611°N 97.597573°W
- Members: ~6,100
- Website: ninety-nines.org

The Ninety-Nines: International Organization of Women Pilots, also known as The 99s, is an international organization that provides networking, mentoring, and flight scholarship opportunities to recreational and professional female pilots. Founded in 1929, the Ninety-Nines has 153 chapters and 27 regional 'sections' across the globe as of 2022, including a 'virtual' chapter, Ambassador 99s, which meets online for those who are too busy or mobile to be in one region for long.

Amelia Earhart was elected as their first president in 1931, and the organization has continued to make a significant impact supporting the advancement of women in aviation since its inception. In 1982, the Ninety-Nines received the National Aviation Hall of Fame Spirit of Flight Award, and were inducted into the Oklahoma Air Space Museum Hall of Fame in 2001. In 2002, the organization was selected as the recipient of the Frank G. Brewer Trophy by the National Aeronautic Association, and in 2014 became inducted into the International Air & Space Hall of Fame at the San Diego Air & Space Museum.

External images
- First Meeting, group photo, cropped
- First Meeting, group photo, small
- First Meeting, group photo, medium

== History ==
In August 1929, a small group of female pilots met informally in Cleveland, Ohio, following the United States Women's Air Derby, and that group agreed that there was a need to form an organization to support women in the burgeoning field of aviation. Invitations to an initial meeting at a later date were sent out to all 117 female pilots licensed at the time. On November 2, 1929, the organization was founded at Curtiss Field near Valley Stream, New York, by 26 licensed female pilots for the mutual support and advancement of "Women Pilots." At the suggestion of Amelia Earhart, the organization's name was taken from the number of charter members, settling on "Ninety-Nines" based on responses received by Christmas.

== Membership ==
Charter members include:

- Amelia Earhart

(president 1931–1933)

- Mary C. Alexander
- Arlene Davis
- Ruth Elder
- Viola Gentry
- Fay Gillis
- Mary Goodrich
- Florence Klingensmith
- Opal Kunz
- Ila Loetscher
- Ruth Rowland Nichols
- Phoebe Omlie
- Thea Rasche
- Marjorie Stinson
- Louise Thaden
- Mary Webb Nicholson
- Helen Cox Bikle
- Nellie Zabel Willhite

Other notable members include:

- Margaret Adams
- Ruth Alexander
- Suzie Azar
- Pancho Barnes
- Velta Benn
- Mary Foley Benson
- Janet Zaph Briggs
- Maie Casey, Baroness Casey
- Katherine Sui Fun Cheung
- Jackie Cochran

(president 1941–1943)

- Eileen Collins
- Marjorie Crawford
- Patricia Denkler
- Betty Gillies
- Linda M. Godwin
- Kathryn Hach-Darrow
- Nancy Hopkins
- Elvy Kalep
- Peggy Kelman
- Theresa M. Korn
- Dot Lemon
- Elsie MacGill
- Anésia Pinheiro Machado
- Pamela Melroy
- Betty Miller (pilot)
- Terry Neese
- Norah O'Neill
- Bernice Blake Perry
- Carol Rabadi
- Ruth Reinhold
- Dorothy Rungeling
- Sheila Scott
- Katharine Stinson
- Jane Straughan
- Manila Davis Talley
- Jean Kaye Tinsley
- Penny Thompson
- Bobbi Trout
- Yvonne Trueman
- Alia Twal
- Hermelinda Urvina
- Augusta Van Buren
- Patty Wagstaff
- Shannon Walker
- Nancy-Bird Walton
- Jessie E. Woods
- Edna Gardner Whyte

(president 1955–1957)

- Jeana Yeager

Charter member Margaret Thomas "Tommy" Warren believes she might have been the youngest charter member of the 99's – being only 17 when she joined. She was not present at the first gathering of women aviators on Long Island in October 1929, but did go to New York with Frances Harrell for the second meeting on December 14 at the home of Opal Kunz, and was appointed to represent Texas.

The Ninety-Nines, Inc. is a non-profit 501(c)3 organization, and as of 2017 has 5,159 members in 30 countries. The mission of the Ninety-Nines is to promote world fellowship through flight, provide networking and scholarship opportunities for women in aviation, foster aviation education opportunities in the community, and preserve the unique history of women in aviation. The organization is divided into "sections" that are part of geographical areas covering multiple states in the continental U.S. and outlying territories, provinces in Canada, and regions of countries in continents across the globe. Chapters are the smallest grouping, often representing large cities or metropolitan areas under their geographical "sections".

== Historical initiatives ==
Efforts of members which significantly contributed to the documentation, preservation and publication of The Ninety-Nines historical records and museum contributions include those of Virginia Thompson, who joined the organization in 1954. Thompson became the first Historian of the Mid-Atlantic Section (formerly the Middle-East Section), a founding member and Chairman of the Washington D.C. Chapter, and eventually the Mid-Atlantic Section Governor during a pivotal time in U.S. History leading up to the Kennedy Administration and boom of the United States Aerospace Industry.

On July 26, 1963, Thompson, along with five other female aviators (including charter member and former Ninety-Nines International President, Blanche Noyes) accompanied President John F. Kennedy as he personally honored aviatrixes during the Amelia Earhart First Day Cover presentation at the White House. In addition to founding the Shenandoah Valley Chapter, Thompson served as International Historian of the Ninety-Nines for many years, and was Secretary of the International Women's Air and Space Museum, and a Smithsonian archivist. For nearly 65 years, Virginia Thompson was an active member of The Ninety-Nines until her death in 2019.

== Scholarship fund ==
The Ninety-Nines Amelia Earhart Memorial Scholarship Fund (AEMSF) program assists in funding flight training, technical training or academics for both recreational and career track women pilots by awarding scholarships to qualified members. The AEMSF "First Wings" award is a progressive milestone scholarship of up to $6,000 to assist a student pilot Ninety-Nine in completing her Private Pilot training. In addition to the AEMSF program, many individual chapters of the Ninety-Nines give their own flight scholarships to benefit local woman aviators.

== For aspiring professional pilots ==
Aspiring professional or new commercial pilots can find career guidance and mentorship in the Ninety-Nines "Professional Pilot Leadership Initiative" program.

== Museums and activities ==
=== Amelia Earhart Birthplace Museum ===
The Ninety-Nines are owner-custodians of the Amelia Earhart Birthplace Museum in Atchison, Kansas. The birthplace and early childhood home of early aviator Amelia Earhart has been listed on the National Register of Historic Places and has been returned to its turn-of-the-century condition by the "99s"; it features an abundance of personal and family memorabilia.

=== 99s Museum of Women Pilots ===
Their international headquarters building on Will Rogers World Airport in Oklahoma City, Oklahoma, is home to the 99s Museum of Women Pilots. Museum artifacts include historical papers, personal items, video and oral histories, photos, memorabilia and other notable artifacts from famed woman aviators from around the globe. The museum collection and exhibits provide insight into the role women pilots played in the development of aviation and their historical footprint.

=== Activities ===
Ninety-Nines members support the goals of the organization by being active in numerous aviation activities, including: aviation education seminars in the community, air racing, from the Powder Puff Derby to the Palms to Pines and the Air Race Classic; and airmarking by volunteering their time to paint airport names, compass rose symbols and other identifications on airports and the National Intercollegiate Flying Association (NIFA). Most regional and national NIFA competitions have "99s" on their panels of judges.

== See also ==
- New Hampshire Historical Marker No. 268: Bernice Blake Perry (1905–1996), honoring a charter member of the Ninety-Nines
