= International Women's Air & Space Museum =

Museum in Cleveland, Ohio

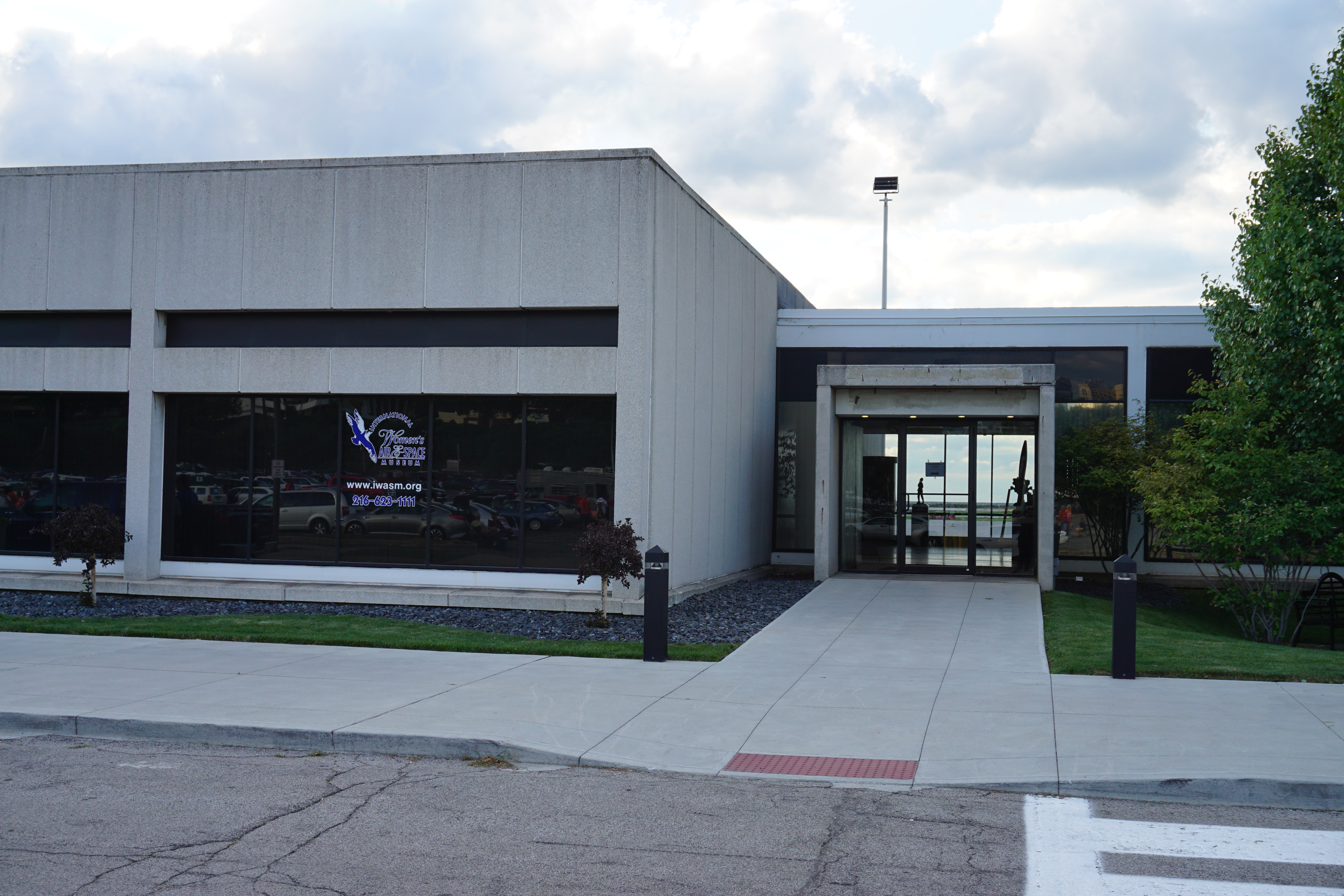
- International Women's Air & Space Museum entrance in 2015
- Location: Cleveland, Ohio
- Coordinates: 41°31′03″N 081°41′00″W

The International Women's Air & Space Museum, Inc. (IWASM) is a museum in Cleveland, Ohio, that preserves the history of women in aviation and space and documents their continuing contributions.

The museum began as a committee of the Ninety-Nines, an organization of women pilots, that sought to collect historical artifacts and memorabilia of women pilots.

In 1986, the International Women's Air & Space Museum opened in Centerville, Ohio, in the former home of one of the Wright brothers' uncles. Bernice Steadman, an aviator and member of the Mercury 13, was one of the museum's co-founders.

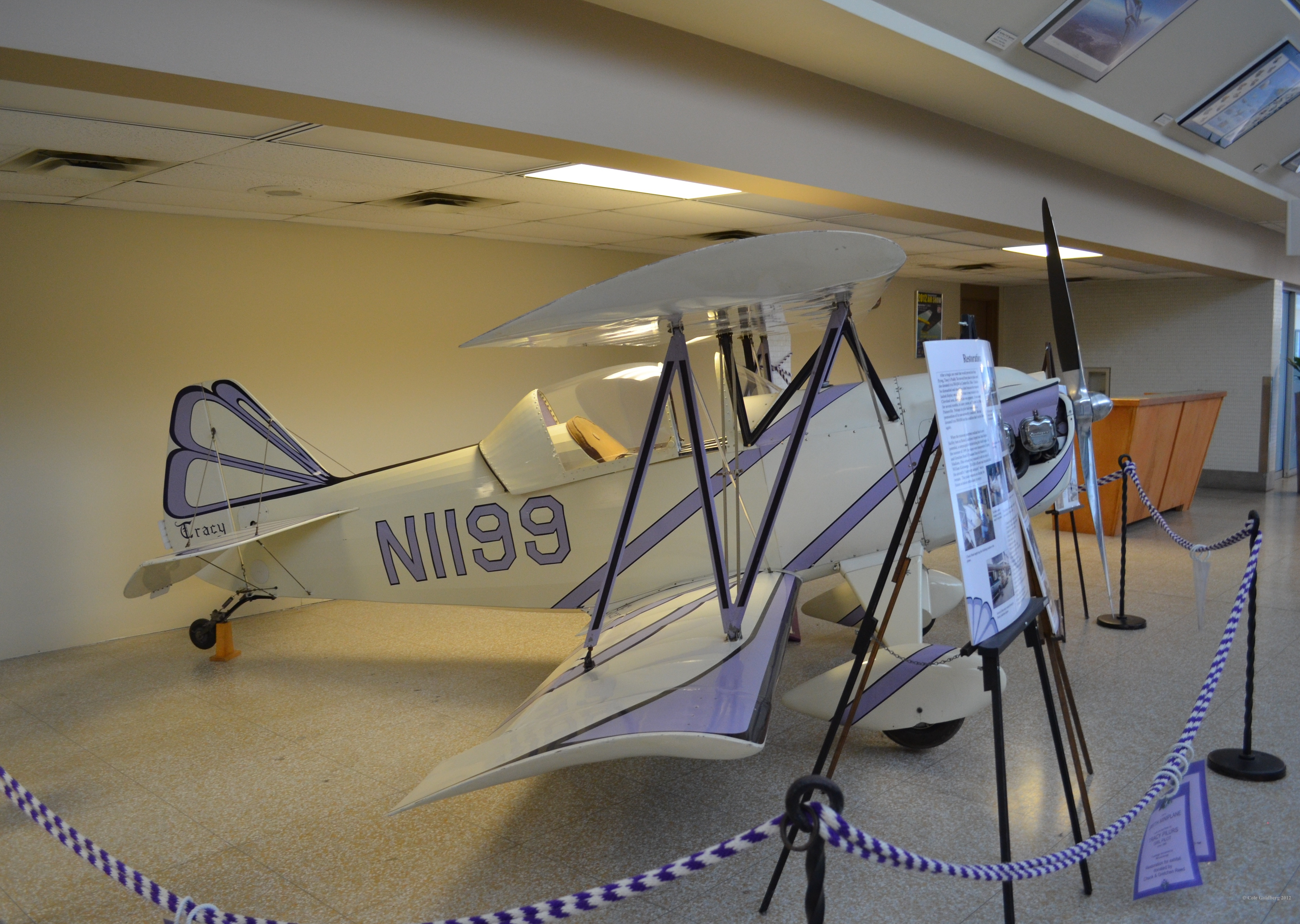
A Pilurs-Smith DSA-1 Miniplane built by Tracy Pilurs, on permanent display in the terminal at Cleveland Burke Lakefront Airport.

When IWASM outgrew its Centerville home, it moved in 1998 to Burke Lakefront Airport in Cleveland, where it sits in the terminal's lobby and west concourse. As the airport is a public building, the museum is accessible every day during operating hours and charges no admission fee.

== See also ==
- Amelia Earhart Hangar Museum
- National WASP WWII Museum
- Ninety-Nines Museum of Women Pilots
