= Women at NASA =

Summary of women's involvement in NASA

The role of women in and affiliated with NASA has varied over time. As early as 1922 women were working as physicists and in other technical positions.^{[1]} Throughout the 1930s to the present, more women joined the NASA teams not only at Langley Memorial, but at the Jet Propulsion Laboratory, the Glenn Research Center, and other numerous NASA sites throughout the United States.^{[2]} As the space program has grown, women have advanced into many roles, including astronauts.

== History ==
=== 1920s ===
As early as 1922 women like Pearl I. Young were working as physicists and other technical positions. Young was the second female physicist working for the federal government at the National Advisory Committee for Aeronautics (NACA), at Langley Memorial Aeronautical Laboratory building 1202 in Langley, Virginia.

=== 1960s ===
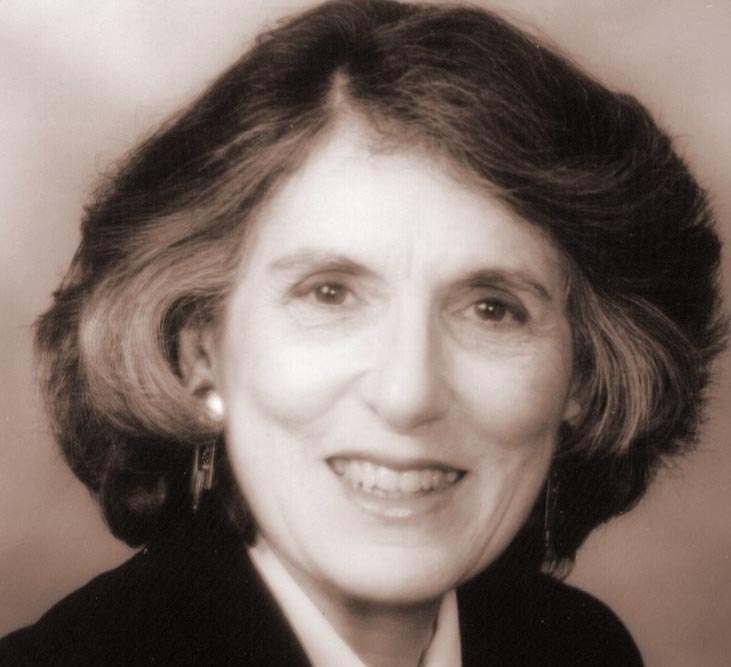
Dana Ulery, first woman engineer at the Jet Propulsion Laboratory

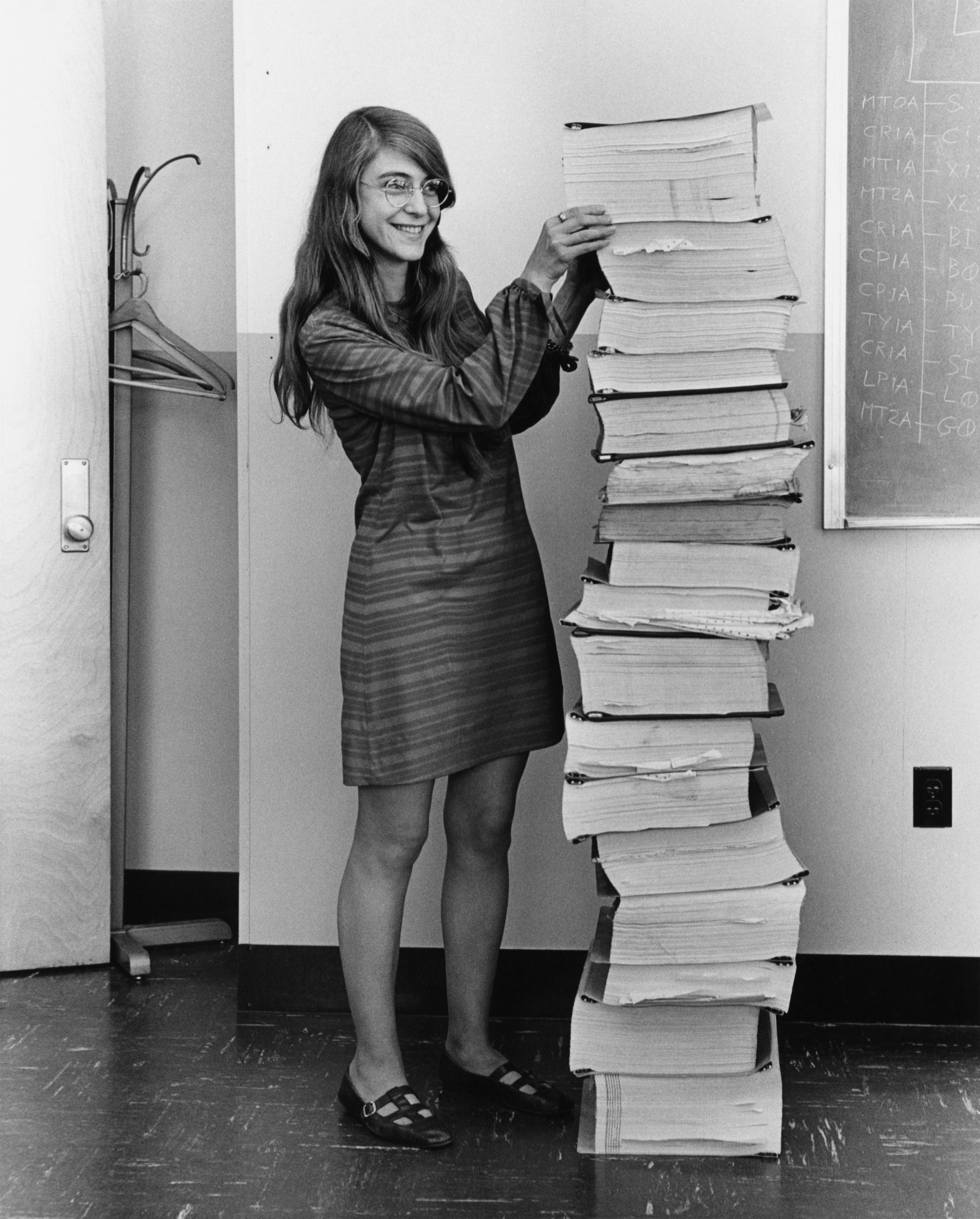
Apollo guidance computer lead programmer Margaret Hamilton with software that was written by her and her team

Women first worked in support as administrators, secretaries, doctors, psychologists, and later engineers. In the 1960s, NASA started recruiting women and minorities for the space program. By the end of the 1960s, NASA had employed thousands of women. Some of the women like Mary Shep Burton, Gloria B. Martinez (the first Spanish woman hired), Cathy Osgood, and Shirley Hunt worked in the computer division while Sue Erwin, Lois Ransdell, and Maureen Bowen worked as secretaries for various members of the Mission and Flight Control teams. Dana Ulery was the first woman engineer to be hired at the Jet Propulsion Laboratory (JPL) of NASA. Although she was only considered as a junior engineer, for more than seven years, no woman engineer got into JPL besides Ulery. Another woman, Donna Shirley, worked in JPL as a mission engineer in the 1960s. Also, Dr. Carolyn Huntoon, a woman, was a pioneer in researching astronaut metabolisms and other body systems. Margaret Hamilton was the guidance computer lead programmer for the Apollo program. Judy Sullivan was the lead biomedical engineer for the Apollo 11 mission.

Although woman had a difficult time establishing themselves within the organization, NASA did have some women who charted unknown territory throughout the time period. For example, Katherine Johnson was one of the most prolific figures in NASA history. Johnson worked through the ranks as a black woman and made it as one of the top and most respected engineers on the Apollo mission. This was seen as a major step for blacks and women throughout NASA and the general public for others to look up to. Along with Katherine Johnson, who ended up playing a pivotal role as a computer for NASA, Dorothy Vaughan and Mary Jackson helped calculate integral equations and mathematical calculations to recheck and assure that the launching of spacecraft was calculated correctly. Overall, these figures stood as pioneers to the growing commonality of women working for NASA.

However, not everyone was accepting of this phenomenon. In 1962, George Low, NASA's Chief of Manned Spaceflight, fought against women by telling the congress that working with women would delay his work. Meanwhile, in the same year, John F. Kennedy signed the President's Commission on the Status of Women to encourage gender equality in the workforce. This eventually led to James Webb, a NASA administrator, creating an agency-wide policy directive stating that NASA provides equal opportunities for all kinds of people willing to work with NASA. Despite this, no women were selected to join the astronaut corps in 1963/65/66/67.

=== 1970s ===
The 1970s was a stepping stone that lead women a step closer to becoming astronauts. At the same time, the military began accepting women for pilot training that eventually led to women astronauts. In 1977, the recruitment of NASA skyrocketed because of Nichelle Nichols's help. Part of the advantage Nichols had in the recruitment was that her role as Lieutenant Uhura on Star Trek inspired young girls to become astronauts at NASA when they grow up. One of these girls was Dr. Mae Jemison, the first black woman astronaut in 1992. Another important character in the 1970s was Dr. Carolyn Huntoon who turned down being an astronaut to serve on the astronaut selection committee. NASA sent Huntoon around the United States to encourage women to apply as astronauts or to get into the STEM field. In 1979, Kathryn Sullivan flew a NASA WB-57F reconnaissance aircraft to 63,300 feet altitude breaking an unofficial altitude record for American women.

=== 1980s ===
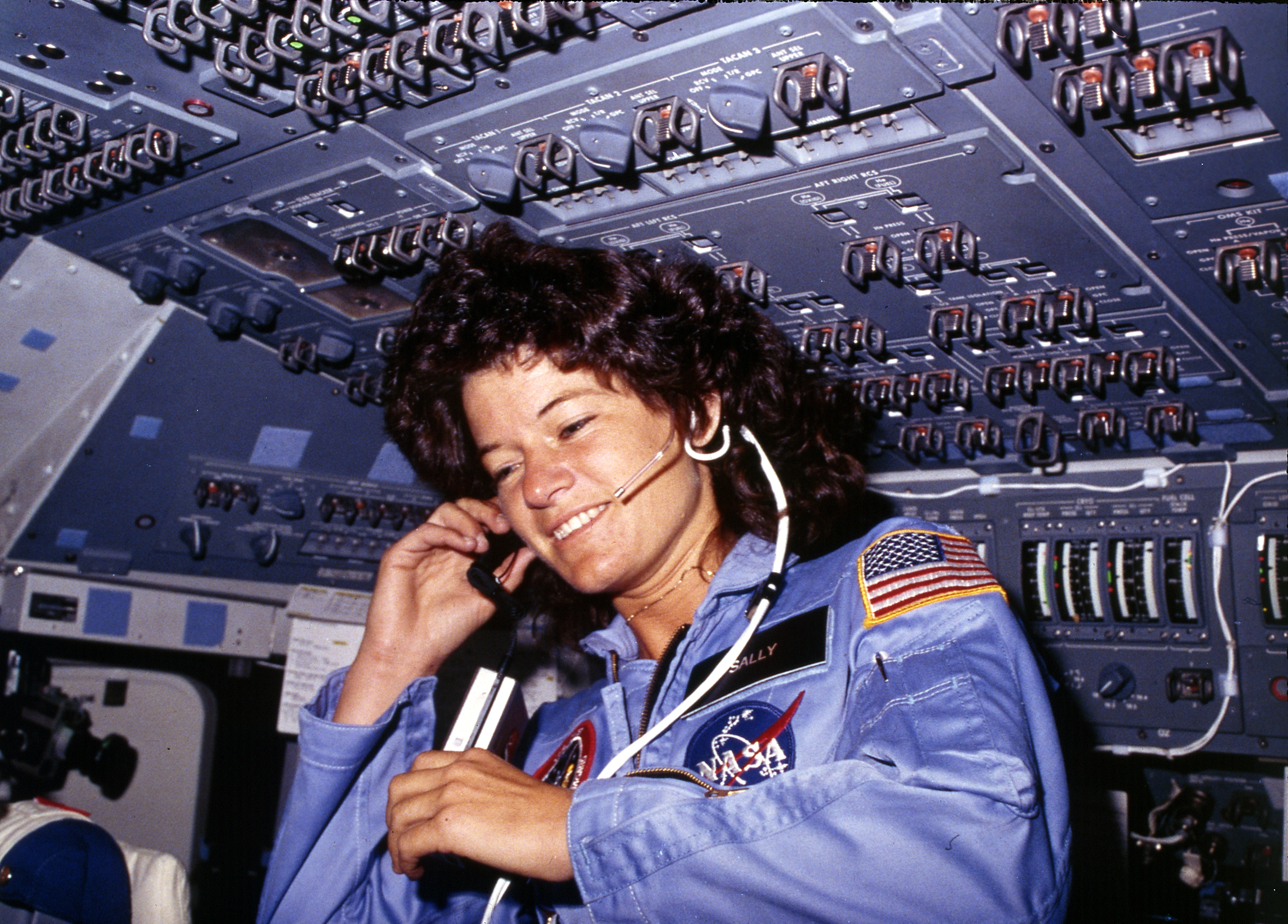
Sally Ride, America's first woman astronaut

On June 18, 1983, Sally Ride made history as the first American woman astronaut to go into space. About more than a year later, Judith Resnik took the Space Shuttle Discovery into space and became the second American woman in space. In 1988, Ellen Ochoa joined NASA and became the first Hispanic woman astronaut. Ochoa took on multiple missions that included Space shuttles Discovery, Atlantis, four flights, and almost 1,000 hours in space. In 1985, Shannon Lucid took on her first flight and by the end of her career she had spent 188 days in space. Lucid set an American record, for both men and women, with the most number of days in space until 2002.

=== 1990s ===
By the 1990s, NASA was doing a lot of research in women's bodies and the effects of space to their bodies. Carolyn Huntoon gave a speech in 1994 at the 2nd Annual Women's Health and Space Luncheon by giving light to the unrecognized work of NASA. On February 3, 1995, history was made when Colonel Eileen Collins became the first woman to pilot an US spacecraft. Meanwhile, Shannon Lucid, a board engineer, took on five missions in space and worked as chief scientist for NASA in Washington, DC.

=== 2000s ===
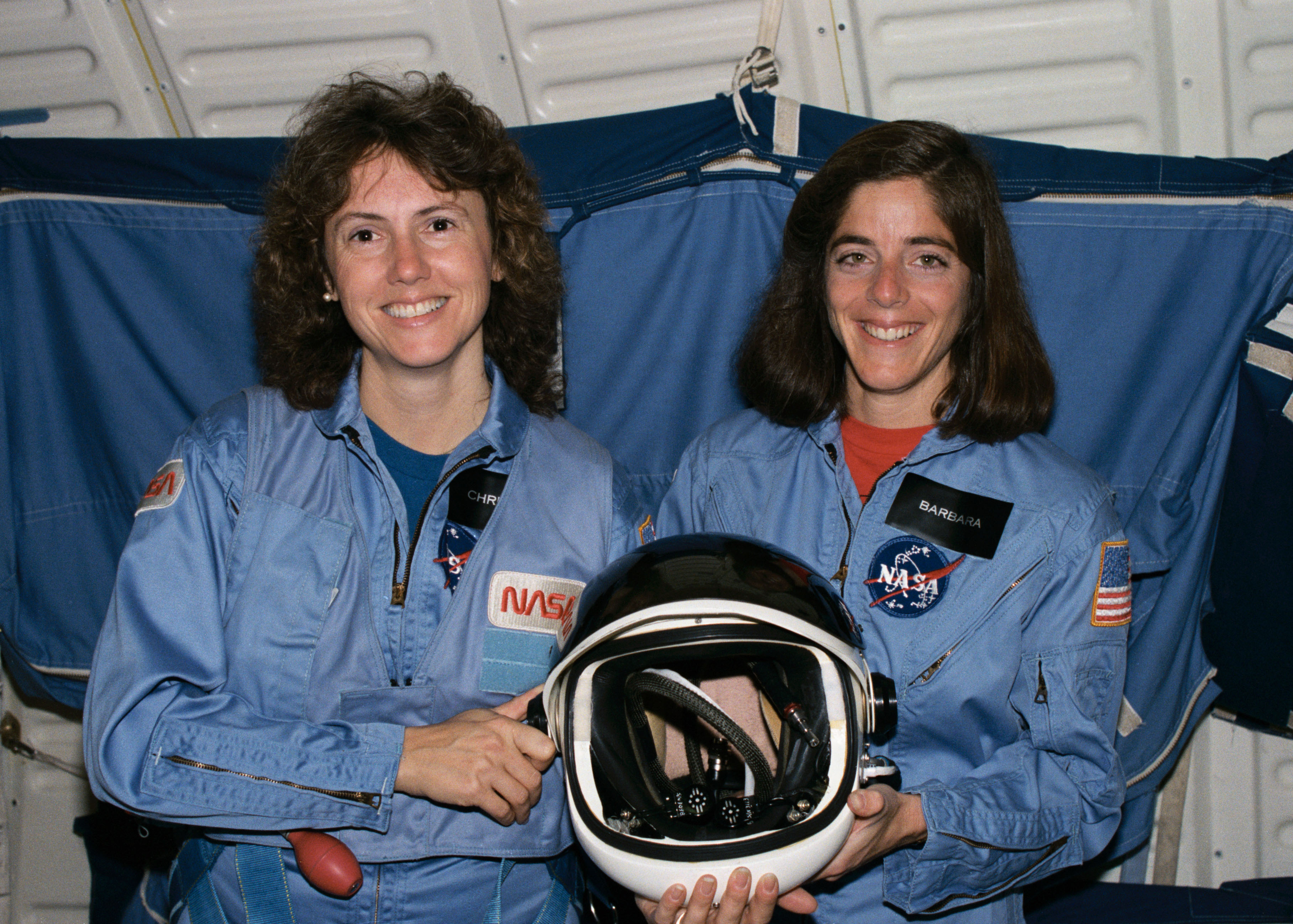
McAuliffe and Morgan in Teacher in Space Project

Starting year 2000, the number of women in NASA's planetary missions started to increase. Women were most given roles as Co-Investigators and Participating Scientists. From below 10% of women selected until the 1990s, this percentage started to increase in the 2000s up to around 30% of women, particularly, the women being given the role as Co-Investigators. Pamela Melroy, for example, took on several missions to the International Space Station on the shuttles Discovery and Atlantis. Not only was Melroy an astronaut but she was also a veteran military pilot who has more than 5,000 hours of flight time. In 2007, Peggy Whitson became the first woman to command the International Space Station. Aside from commanding, Whitson conducted dozens of tests in space that furthered space technologies that are still being used today.

In the same year, Barbara Morgan became the first teacher in space; however, it was argued that Christa McAuliffe was announced in 1985 as the first teacher in space, and Barbara Morgan was only an alternate or secondary candidate. In 1986, Christa McAuliffe died in Challenger accident and Morgan was unable to go to space until 2007.

=== 2010s ===
Sunita Williams is known for holding many records for women, including 322 total days in space, spent over 50 hours walking in space and being the second women to command the ISS.

== Women in space program ==
The unofficial program of Mercury 13 was considered as the start of inclusion of women in U.S space programs, wherein the first seven astronauts chosen for this project were all white men. Randy Lovelace and Don Flickinger, who were involved in the selection process, considered including women for this project. Lovelace thought that women can also do major tasks in space just like men. Through this, Lovelace and Flickinger met Jerrie Cobb, a woman, in 1960, who played a major role in recruiting and testing women.

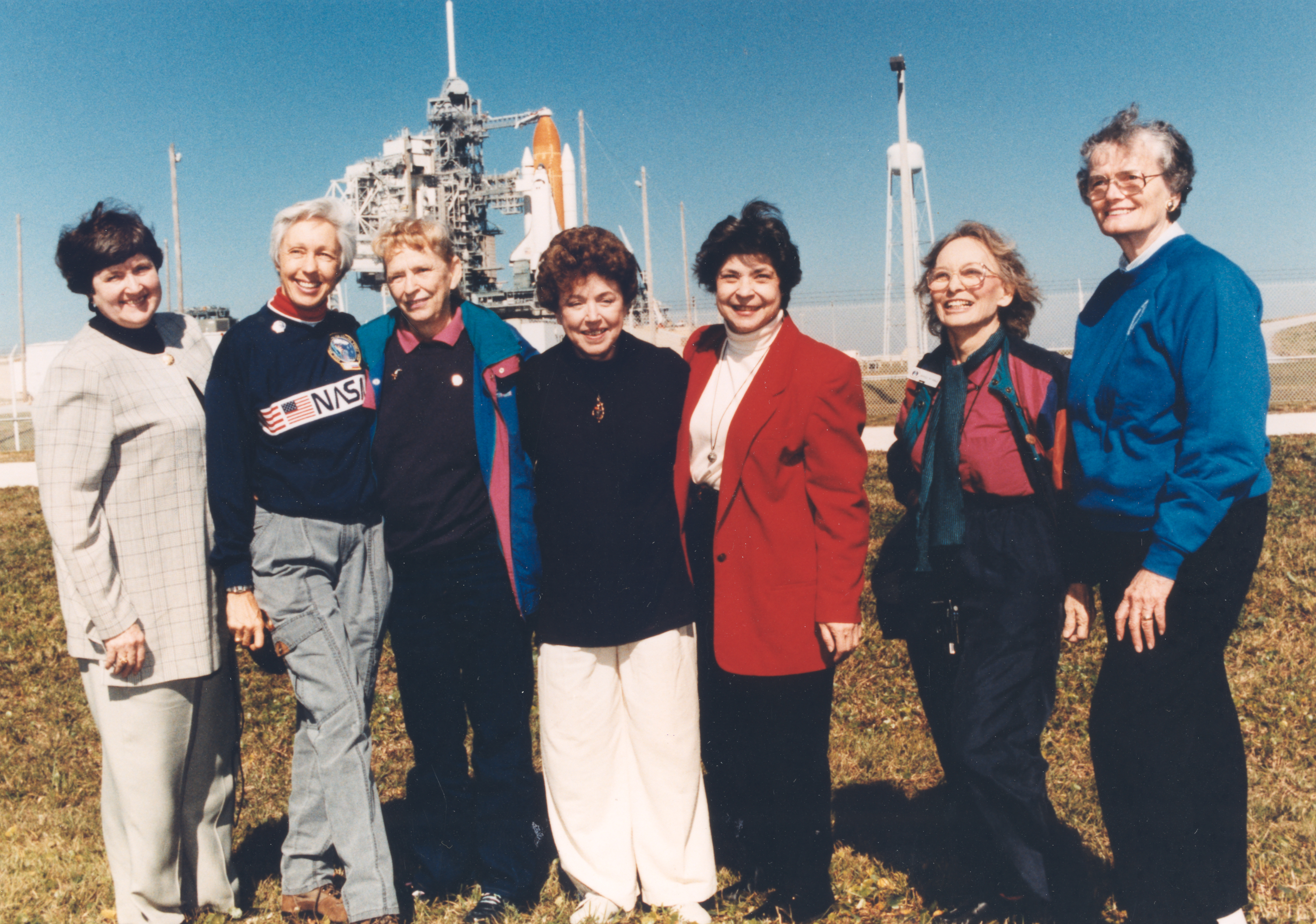
Some members of the FLATs (Fellow Lady Astronaut Trainees)

Women in Space Program (December 20, 1959) was the “revived” version of the Women in Space Earliest program that was cancelled in November 1959. Similar to the program for men, this required candidate testings. However, the parameters for these tests were varied to accommodate women. In the screening phase, for example, men were required to be degree-holder jet pilots, went to military test pilot school, and with experience of minimum 1,500 hours of flying time. Since women were deprived from some of these opportunities, screenings shifted to women with commercial pilot licenses, especially that women served as instructors during this time. Cobb, who underwent the testing first, became the leader of the FLATs (Fellow Lady Astronaut Trainees) with 12 other women, which made 13 women in total (hence, the media named it Mercury 13). Even though Cobb was assigned as a NASA consultant and continued doing the testings, women were still not trained to be astronauts.

During the examinations for women, some scientists thought that women showed advantages for being sent to space rather than men. For example, internal organs of women were assumed to be more suitable in radiation and vibrations. Due to the relatively smaller size of women, spacecraft and flights would be less expensive if women were to use spacecraft. However, testing for women were cancelled after it was discovered that NASA did not issue an official request for such action. Lovelace decided to not continue the program and ended up in an uncomfortable situation at NASA. Meanwhile, Jerrie Cobb, who assumed leadership and facilitated the testings for women, was removed from her position at NASA.

== Today in NASA ==
Since the first astronaut, Sally Ride, there have been 43 American women who have gone to space by the year 2012. Outside of the U.S. there have only been 12 other women astronauts that have been in space. As of 2009, about 10 percent of astronauts in NASA are women.

== Major events ==
- 1959: Brigadier General Don Flickinger, a member of the NASA Special Advisory Committee on Life Sciences, along with Dr. W. Randolph “Randy” Lovelace II, inaugurated the Woman in Space Earliest (WISE) program
- 1960: Dr. Nancy Grace Roman became the first woman to hold an executive position at NASA
- 1961: Jerrie Cobb was appointed as a NASA administration consultant
- 1961: John F. Kennedy stated in the American Girl magazine that both sexes are needed in America's space program
- 1963: Soviet cosmonaut Valentina Tereshkova became the first woman to be in space
- 1978: Anna Fisher, Shannon W. Lucid, Judith A. Resnik, Sally K. Ride, Margaret R. Seddon, and Kathryn D. Sullivan chosen to become astronauts
- 1983 (June 18): Sally Ride became the first US woman to fly to space
- 1984: Kathryn Dwyer Sullivan became the first US woman to walk in space
- 1986 (January): Judith A. Resnik and payload specialist, Sharon Christa McAuliffe, died in the Challenger accident.
- 1992 (September 11): Mae Jemison became first black woman in space
- 1993: Ellen Ochoa became the first Hispanic woman in space
- 1994: Carolyn Huntoon became the first woman center director at NASA (at Johnson Space Center)
- 1996: Shannon Lucid became the first woman to receive the Congressional Space Medal of Honor
- 1999 (July 20): Eileen Collins became the first US woman to command a spacecraft
- 2005: Shana Dale became the first woman Deputy Administrator of NASA
- 2007: Peggy Whitson became the first woman to command the International Space Station

== Active Women Astronauts ==
- Serena M. Auñón-Chancellor, MD
- Tracy Caldwell Dyson, PhD
- Jeanette J. Epps, PhD
- Christina Hammock Koch
- Nicole Mann, LtCol, U.S. Marine Corps
- Megan McArthur, PhD
- Anne C. McClain, Lt Col, U.S. Army
- Jessica U. Meir, PhD
- Kathleen Rubins, PhD
- Shannon Walker, PhD
- Stephanie D. Wilson
- Sunita L. Williams, Captain, U.S. Navy, Ret.

== See also ==
- NASA
- Women's history
