= Millicent S. Ficken =

American ornithologist (1933–2020)

- Born: Millicent Beth Sigler; 27 July 1933; Washington, D.C.
- Died: 7 July 2020 (aged 86); Grafton, Wisconsin
- Education: Cornell University
- Occupation: Ornithologist
- Spouse: Robert William Ficken
- Relatives: Children: John and Carolyn

Millicent S. Ficken (27 July 1933 – 7 July 2020), also known as Millicent Sigler Ficken, was an American ornithologist who specialized in birds' vocalizations and their social behaviors.

== Biography ==
Millicent Beth Sigler, known as Penny, was born in Washington, D.C., the daughter of Phares Oscar Sigler and Helen Elizabeth Richards. Because of her father's military obligations, the family traveled widely.

=== Education ===
After graduating from Leesville High School in Leesville, Louisiana in June 1951, Sigler enrolled at Cornell University in Ithaca, New York, in September 1951. There she was awarded her Bachelor of Science degree in June 1955, the same month she married Robert William Ficken. The couple had two children, John and Carolyn. (They divorced in 1989.)

From September 1955 to January 1956, Ficken worked as a research assistant in the Bacteriology Laboratory at the University of Oklahoma. From February 1956 to September 1957 she was a lab technician working with insects at Cornell. In 1960, she earned her Ph.D. in zoology from Cornell with her dissertation titled Behavior of the American Redstart, Setophaga ruticilla (Linnaeus).

=== Research ===
From 1960 to 1962, Ficken worked as a postdoctoral researcher at Cornell. In 1962 she published the book titled The Comparative Ethology of the Wood Warblers with Robert William Ficken. From 1963 to 1967 she was a research fellow in the Department of Zoology at the University of Maryland, College Park. From 1967 to 1975, she became an assistant professor and then an associate zoology professor at the University of Wisconsin-Milwaukee (UWM). From 1967 to 1997, she served as director of the biological field station at the same university, and in 1975 she was named a full professor.

Ficken's research interests included animal communication with a focus on the calls and social behavior of birds, especially penguins, hummingbirds and North American songbirds, on whose vocalizations she carried out several long studies. Among her "ground-breaking work" on bird sounds was her discovery that Black-capped Chickadees "have complex calls that qualify as a language and that birds 'take turns' singing in the morning to avoid overlapping the songs of others."

In 1996 she wrote an article on the Boreal Chickadee (Poecile hudsonicus) and in 1998 wrote another on the Bridled titmouse (Baeolophus wollweberi) in Birds of North America published by the Cornell Laboratory of Ornithology.

=== Retirement ===
After retiring from the university in 1999, she continued pursuing her own scientific studies, and in 2003 she was made Professor Emerita at the Department of Life Sciences at UWM. She liked to travel and made frequent trips to Latin America.

Ficken was living in Grafton, Wisconsin when she died on 7 July 2020 at aged 86.

== Dedication ==
In his orchestral work, The Chickadee Symphony, composer Craig Thomas Naylor, added the following notation to his score's title page: "Dedicated to Millicent ('Penny') Ficken." In his notes to the conductor, Naylor credited Ficken with introducing him to the Black-capped Chickadee and their "remarkably complex" vocalizations. He says he was able to incorporate four of them into his musical score.

[Penny] patiently taught me the intricacies of chickadee vocalizations. Penny is a true pioneer in avian research: she was doing digital transcriptions in the late 1970s and early 1980s when I, as an electronic musician, was still working with electronic tape. As I read the literature, I found article after article by Penny, a truly amazing output. Many of the research methods used today were pioneered by her.

== Memberships ==
Ficken was the first woman to be elected a fellow of both the American Ornithologists' Society and the Animal Behavior Society (she was the third woman to be elected to the latter society in 1989). She was also a member of the American Association for the Advancement of Science (AAAS) and the Society for the Study of Evolution.

== Selected publications ==
According to JSTOR, Ficken was widely published, including more than 100 scientific articles, newsletters, proceedings and books.

- Ficken, Millicent Sigler; Popp, James W. (2010). "Syntactical Organization of the Gargle Vocalization of the Black-capped Chickadee, Parus atricapillus". Ethology. 91 (2): 156–168. doi:10.1111/j.1439-0310.1992.tb00860.x.
- Hailman, Jack P.; Ficken, Millicent S.; Ficken, Robert W. (1987). "Constraints on the Structure of Combinatorial "Chick-a-dee" Calls". Ethology. 75: 62–80. doi:10.1111/j.1439-0310.1987.tb00642.x.
- Rusch, Kathryn M.; Thusius, Kevin; Ficken, Millicent Sigler (2001). "The Organization of Agonistic Vocalizations in Ruby-Throated Hummingbirds with a Comparison to Black-Chinned Hummingbirds". The Wilson Bulletin. 113 (4): 425. doi:10.1676/0043-5643(2001)113[0425:TOOAVI]2.0.CO;2. ISSN 0043-5643. S2CID 85873823.
- Pytte, Carolyn L.; Ficken, Millicent S.; Moiseff, Andrew (2004). "Ultrasonic singing by the blue-throated hummingbird: A comparison between production and perception". Journal of Comparative Physiology A. 190 (8): 665–673. doi:10.1007/s00359-004-0525-4. PMID 15164219. S2CID 7231117.
- Pytte, Carolyn L.; Rusch, Kathryn M.; Ficken, Millicent Sigler (2003). "Regulation of vocal amplitude by the blue-throated hummingbird, Lampornis clemenciae". Animal Behaviour. 66 (4): 703–710. doi:10.1006/anbe.2003.2257. S2CID 53178389.
- Ficken, Millicent Sigler; Rusch, Kathryn M.; Taylor, Sandra J.; Powers, Donald R. (2002). "Reproductive Behavior and Communication in Blue-Throated Hummingbirds". The Wilson Bulletin. 114 (2): 197. doi:10.1676/0043-5643(2002)114[0197:RBACIB]2.0.CO;2. ISSN 0043-5643. S2CID 86243758.
- Ficken, Millicent Sigler (2002). "Parent-Offspring Conflict in Blue-Throated Hummingbirds". The Southwestern Naturalist. 47 (1): 118–121. doi:10.2307/3672813. JSTOR 3672813.
- Ficken, Millicent Sigler (2000). "Call Similarities among Mixed Species Flock Associates". The Southwestern Naturalist. 45 (2): 154–158. doi:10.2307/3672456. JSTOR 3672456.
- Ficken, Millicent Sigler; Rusch, Kathryn M.; Taylor, Sandra J.; Powers, Donald R. (2000). "Blue-Throated Hummingbird Song: A Pinnacle of Nonoscine Vocalizations". The Auk. 117: 120. doi:10.1642/0004-8038(2000)117[0120:BTHSAP]2.0.CO;2. ISSN 0004-8038.
