= Kavika Pittman =

American football player (born 1974)

No. 97, 95, 92
- Position: Defensive end

Personal information
- Born: October 9, 1974 (age 52); Frankfurt, West Germany
- Listed height: 6 ft 6 in (1.98 m)
- Listed weight: 273 lb (124 kg)

Career information
- High school: Leesville (Leesville, Louisiana, U.S.)
- College: McNeese State
- NFL draft: 1996: 2nd round, 37th overall pick

Career history
- Dallas Cowboys (1996–1999); Denver Broncos (2000–2002); Carolina Panthers (2003–2004)

Awards and highlights
- 2× All-Southland Conference (1994, 1995); Division I-AA All-American (1995); Southland Conference Defensive Player of the Year (1995); Louisiana Defensive Player of the Year (1995); All-time Southland Conference football team

Career NFL statistics
- Games played: 108
- Total tackles: 191
- Sacks: 18
- Forced fumbles: 3
- Fumble recoveries: 6
- Stats at Pro Football Reference

Kavika Charles Pittman (born October 9, 1974) is a German-born former professional football defensive end in the National Football League (NFL) for the Dallas Cowboys, Denver Broncos, and Carolina Panthers. He played college football at McNeese State University.

== Early life ==
Pittman was born in Frankfurt, Germany, where his father was stationed with the United States Army. After five moves, his family settled in Leesville, Louisiana, where as a senior at Leesville High School he was an All-State selection and the district Most Valuable Player, after finishing with 94 tackles and 12 sacks.

In track and field, he won the district championship in the high jump, long jump and the triple jump as a senior. In basketball, he helped his AAU All-star team win a national championship.

== College career ==
Pittman accepted a football scholarship from McNeese State University. After sitting out his freshman season, he played in 5 games as a sophomore, tallying 8 tackles (6 solo) and 2 quarterback pressures, before suffering a deep left thigh bruise that forced him to miss the remainder of the season.

As a junior, he was named a starter on a defense that was ranked sixth in Division I-AA. He earned All-Southland Conference honors, recording 59 tackles (4 for loss), 4 sacks, 11 quarterback pressures, one fumble recovery and a blocked kick.

As a senior, he helped his team reach the school's first ever semifinal appearance in the Division I-AA playoffs, while registering 57 tackles (7 for loss), 13 sacks, 18 quarterback pressures, 11 passes defensed, 2 forced fumbles and a blocked kick. Against James Madison University, he had 3 sacks, 8 tackles (one for loss), 2 passes defensed, 3 quarterback pressures and a blocked punt. Against Youngstown State University, he made 3 sacks, 7 tackles, 2 quarterback pressures and one pass defensed.

For his efforts, he was named first-team Division I-AA All-American, Louisiana Defensive Player of the Year and the Southland Conference Defensive Player of the Year. In the postseason he had 10 tackles (2 for losses), one and a half sacks and 4 quarterback pressures. He finished as the school's career All-time sack leader (22.5).

In 2014, he was inducted into the McNeese State Hall of Fame, besides being named to the 1990s and the All-time Southland Conference football teams.

== Professional career ==
=== Dallas Cowboys ===
The Dallas Cowboys traded down their first-round draft choice in the 1996 NFL draft, sending to the Washington Redskins the 30th (Andre Johnson) and 250th (DeAndre Maxwell) picks, in exchange for their 37th and 67th draft choices. The team gambled that they could move down into the second round and still select Tony Brackens, while changing a seventh-round selection into a third (#67-Clay Shiver). The Jacksonville Jaguars ended up selecting Brackens and the Cowboys still needing a defensive end, drafted Pittman in the second round (37th overall). He was originally seen as a project, with the plan of eventually replacing Shante Carver.

As a rookie, he contributed on special teams with 17 tackles (tied for third on the team). He also had 5 defensive tackles and 5 quarterback pressures. The next year, he registered 6 tackles (2 for loss), one sack, one quarterback pressure and 3 special teams tackles.

He was a backup defensive end behind Charles Haley and Tony Tolbert, until earning a starter position in 1998, playing opposite to rookie Greg Ellis and finishing with 6 sacks (led the team), 16 quarterback pressures (third on the team), 59 tackles (3 for loss), 7 passes defensed, 2 fumble recoveries and a forced fumble. He had a sack in four consecutive games. In the fifteenth game against the Philadelphia Eagles, he made 5 tackles before straining his right hamstring in the third quarter, which forced him to miss the last game and the playoff loss against the Arizona Cardinals.

The next year, he started all 16 games and posted a career-high 74 tackles, 3 sacks, 21 quarterback pressures (second on the team) and 10 pass defensed (led the team). After his rookie contract ended, the team didn't re-sign him because of salary cap constraints.

=== Denver Broncos ===
Pittman signed as a free agent with the Denver Broncos in 2000 and as the starter at right defensive end (15 starts), he proceeded to collect a career-high 7 sacks, 39 tackles (33 solo), one pass defensed, one forced fumble and a fumble recovery.

In 2001, he started 14 games at left defensive end, totaling 50 tackles (43 solo), one sack, one pass defensed, one forced fumble and one fumble recovery. He suffered a left calf tear in the 14th game of the season against the Kansas City Chiefs and was placed on the injured reserve list.

He was released during the 2003 offseason, because of the salary cap and a decrease in production.

=== Carolina Panthers ===
On May 23, 2003, he was signed as free agent by the Carolina Panthers. However, in only his second game, he suffered a torn anterior cruciate ligament and medial collateral ligament after being chop-blocked by the Tampa Bay Buccaneers' Keenan McCardell. It would be the last meaningful NFL game he would play. He re-injured the knee during 2004 training camp, was placed on injured reserve and was not re-signed at the end of the season.
