= Buddy Leach =

American politician (1934–2022)

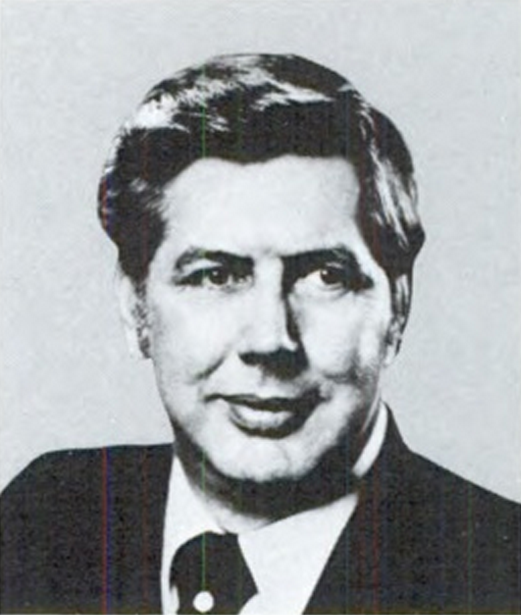

Chair of the Louisiana Democratic Party
- In office January 31, 2010 – April 28, 2012
- Preceded by: Chris Whittington
- Succeeded by: Karen Carter Peterson

Member of the U.S. House of Representatives from Louisiana's 4th district
- In office January 3, 1979 – January 3, 1981
- Preceded by: Joe D. Waggonner
- Succeeded by: Buddy Roemer

Member of the Louisiana House of Representatives from the Allen, Beauregard, and Vernon parishes
- In office 1968–1979
- Preceded by: Bert A. Adams
- Succeeded by: William H. West
- In office 1984–1988
- Preceded by: William H. West
- Succeeded by: John R. Smith

Personal details
- Born: Anthony Claude Leach Jr. March 30, 1934 Leesville, Louisiana, U.S.
- Died: August 6, 2022 (aged 88) Baton Rouge, Louisiana, U.S.
- Party: Democratic
- Education: Louisiana State University (BA, JD)
- Occupation: Businessman; attorney

Military service
- Branch/service: United States Army
- Years of service: 1956–1959

Anthony Claude Leach Jr., known as Buddy Leach (March 30, 1934 – August 6, 2022), was an American businessman, lawyer, military veteran, and Democratic politician from Louisiana. From 1979 to 1981, he served one term as a U.S. representative for Louisiana's 4th congressional district. He also served as a member of the Louisiana House of Representatives and as chairman of the Louisiana Democratic Party.

In 2003, Leach was an unsuccessful candidate for governor of Louisiana in an election won by Kathleen Blanco.

== Early life, education, and career ==
Leach was born in Leesville in Vernon Parish in western Louisiana. He graduated from Leesville High School in 1951. In that same year, Leach entered Louisiana State University, from which he earned his Bachelor of Science. In 1954, Leach was diagnosed with polio. He suffered from temporary paralysis but eventually recovered from the disease.

After attending college, Leach served in the United States Army from 1956 to 1959. He returned to higher education for law school and, in 1963, he obtained his Juris Doctor from the Louisiana State University Law Center in Baton Rouge. In 1964, he was admitted to the Louisiana State Bar Association and began a law practice in Leesville.

After his father Anthony Leach, Sr. died, "Buddy" Leach began running the family plumbing business. Leach sold the business after finding new jobs for all of the employees.

He later became president and CEO of Sweet Lake Land and Oil Company and North American Land Company in Lake Charles in Calcasieu Parish in southwestern Louisiana.

== State and U.S. House of Representatives ==
Leach joined the Democratic Party, which through the mid-20th century was dominated in Louisiana by conservative white members.

In 1968, Leach was elected to the Louisiana House of Representatives. In his first term, he served in a two-member district with fellow Democrat E. Holman Jones of Oakdale, Allen Parish. Leach was reelected in 1972 and 1976.

In 1979, he gave up his seat to run for U.S. Representative from Louisiana's 4th congressional district and was victorious. His election was marred by the disclosure that he purchased hundreds of votes with moon pies and RC Colas but the majority in the House of Representatives(Democrats) certified him as a member anyway. Then in 1980, he was unseated by fellow Democrat Buddy Roemer of Bossier Parish. Roemer later shifted to the Republican Party, a pattern increasingly followed by conservative whites in the state.

In 1983, Leach sought to regain his former state legislative seat. He defeated incumbent Democrat, William H. West. In his last term as a state legislator, Leach served on the House Ways and Means Committee. In this capacity, he recommended that a tax be placed on foreign oil processed within the state.

== Campaign for governor ==
In 2003, Leach launched his gubernatorial campaign, seeking a runoff berth in a crowded field. He campaigned on changing the operations of state government. He suggested that the state use a "brillo pad" to "scrub the budget." Having been diagnosed with polio at a young age, the topic of health care in Louisiana was one of his main priorities. Many young voters were attracted to his campaign's message. He had teams of volunteers set up in Shreveport, Baton Rouge, and New Orleans. Many other candidates were in the race, including Democrats Kathleen Blanco, the lieutenant governor; and Richard Ieyoub, the outgoing state attorney general.

Republicans ran Bobby Jindal as their candidate. Leach came in fourth place in the blanket primary behind Kathleen Blanco, Bobby Jindal, the top two finishers, and Richard Ieyoub. Kathleen Blanco went on to win the general election over Republican Jindal.

== Chairman of the Louisiana Democratic Party ==
In 2010, Leach was elected chairman of the Louisiana Democratic Party in a special election. During his tenure as chairman, the party struggled to field candidates for statewide offices. This was a contrast from when Leach first entered politics in what was then an overwhelmingly Democratic state dominated by conservative whites. Before the late 1960s, African Americans were still largely disenfranchised in the state, totally excluded from politics, as they had been since 1898.

The party was unable to find a well-funded candidate to run in 2011 against Governor Bobby Jindal. For the first time since Reconstruction, Democrats lost both houses of the state legislature to Republicans. On April 28, 2012, Leach lost his reelection bid as state party chair to State Senator Karen Carter Peterson of New Orleans.

== Personal life ==
Leach's younger sister, Carolyn Leach Huntoon, served as director of the Johnson Space Center from 1994 to 1996, and was an assistant secretary in the U.S. Department of Energy from 1999 to 2001. Leach's children include his eldest daughter, Mary Leach Werner (born January 1968), who has followed him into politics. She was an unsuccessful candidate for the Louisiana Public Service Commission in 2016 for the seat held by the late Clyde C. Holloway, a former U.S. representative from Louisiana's 8th congressional district, since disbanded. She was defeated by Mike Francis of Lafayette, a former Louisiana Republican Party state chairman.

=== Death ===
Leach died from heart failure in Baton Rouge on August 6, 2022, aged 88.

Political offices
Preceded by Bert A. Adams	Louisiana State Representative for Allen, Beauregard, and Vernon parishes 1968–1979	Succeeded by William H. West
Preceded by William H. West	Louisiana State Representative for Beauregard, Vernon, and part of Rapides parishes 1984–1988	Succeeded by John R. Smith
U.S. House of Representatives
Preceded by Joe Waggonner	Member of the U.S. House of Representatives from Louisiana's 4th congressional district 1979–1981	Succeeded by Buddy Roemer
