= Leesville High School =

High school in Louisiana, USA

Location
- 502 Berry Drive; Leesville, Louisiana 71446; United States; 31.15049°N 93.25715°W

Information
- Type: Public
- Motto: Dare to Excel
- Established: 1900
- School district: Vernon Parish School District
- Principal: Logan Maddox
- Staff: 51.30 (FTE)
- Grades: 9–12
- Student to teacher ratio: 17.21
- Colors: Black and gold
- Athletics: Football, basketball, track, cross country, girls' volleyball, baseball, softball, soccer, tennis, golf, power lifting
- Mascot: Wampus Cat
- Nickname: Wampus Cats
- Yearbook: Kaleidoscope
- Website: https://lhs.vpsb.us/

Leesville High School is a school located in Leesville, Louisiana, United States. The 9–12 school is a part of the Vernon Parish School Board.

== School uniforms ==
This means that students can wear clothing that conforms to the Vernon Parish Dress code or uniforms, if they wish.

All other campuses are uniform-optional and must follow the Vernon Parish Dress Code or wear uniforms.

== Athletics ==
Leesville High athletics compete in the LHSAA.

=== State championships ===
- Boys Basketball: 2001

=== National championships ===
- Powerlifting: 2025 United States Powerlifting Association CoEd High School Classic Raw Champions

== Notable alumni ==
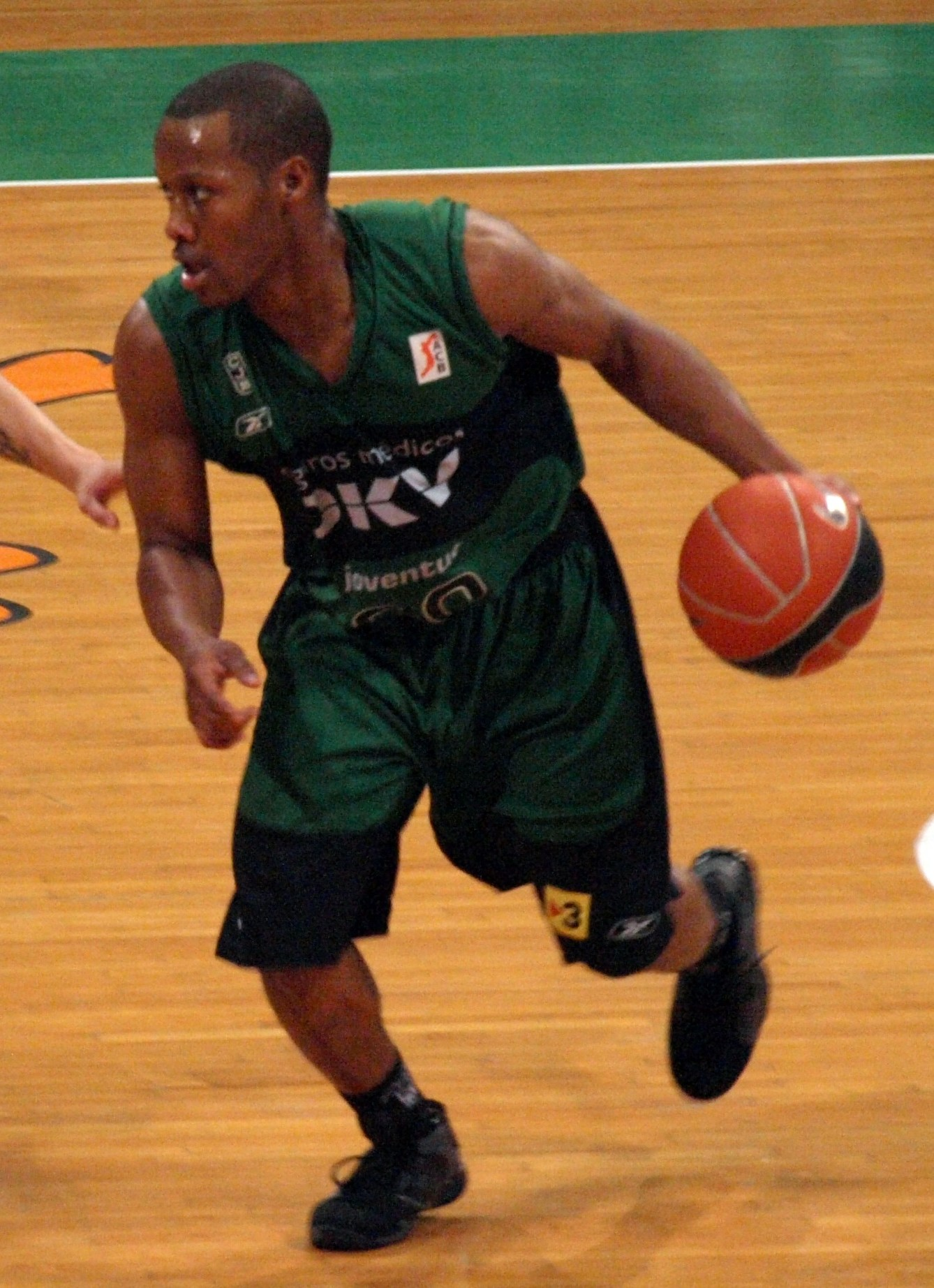
Demond Mallet

- Benjamin Bryant, Class of 1994 (attended 1990–1991), Emmy-nominated broadcaster, writer, and civil servant
- Cecil Collins, Class of 1996, NFL running back
- Millicent S. Ficken, Class of 1951, ornithologist
- Michael Ford, Class of 2009, LSU running back
- Eddie Fuller, Class of 1986, National Football League player, running back with the Buffalo Bills
- Carolyn Huntoon, Class of 1958, scientist; first woman director of the Johnson Space Center in Houston, Texas' sister of Buddy Leach
- Buddy Leach, Class of 1951, Louisiana politician, brother of Carolyn Huntoon
- Demond Mallet, professional basketball player
- Kevin Mawae, Class of 1989, NFL center and member of Pro Football Hall of Fame
- Jim McCrery, Class of 1967, Congressman
- Kavika Pittman, Class of 1993, NFL defensive end
- Keith Smith, Class of 1999, NFL cornerback
- Keith Zinger, Class of 2003, NFL tight end

== Notable faculty ==
- Louisiana State Senator, Gerald Long of Natchitoches taught social studies and coached at Leesville High School in the late 1960s.
