= Bert Adams (politician) =

American politician (1916–2003)

Bert Anthony Adams

Louisiana State Representative for Vernon Parish
- In office 1956–1968
- Preceded by: F. E. Hernandez
- Succeeded by: Two-member district: E. Holman Jones Buddy Leach

Personal details
- Born: October 23, 1916 DeRidder, Louisiana, U.S.
- Died: February 3, 2003 (aged 86)
- Resting place: Leesville Cemetery in Leesville, Louisiana
- Party: Democratic
- Spouse: Bernice Carnell Parker Adams
- Children: Bert William "Skipper" Adams (deceased); Lynn Dell Pynes; Gayle Shaw

Military service
- Branch/service: United States Army; Louisiana National Guard
- Rank: Staff sergeant to second lieutenant on battlefield National Guard Captain
- Battles/wars: World War II; Korean War

Bert Anthony Adams (October 23, 1916 – February 3, 2003) was a decorated war veteran who served from 1956 to 1968 as a Democratic member of the Louisiana House of Representatives from Leesville in Vernon Parish in western Louisiana.

== Biography ==
Born in DeRidder in Beauregard Parish, Adams was a decorated United States Army veteran of World War II and the Korean War.

Adams won his second term in the Democratic primary election held on December 5, 1959.

=== Private life ===
He died on February 3, 2003 at the age of 86.

Louisiana House of Representatives
Preceded by F. E. Hernandez	Louisiana State Representative for Vernon Parish; 1956 – 1968	Succeeded by Two-member district: Claude Leach; E. Holman Jones
