= Kevin Mawae =

American football player and coach (born 1971)

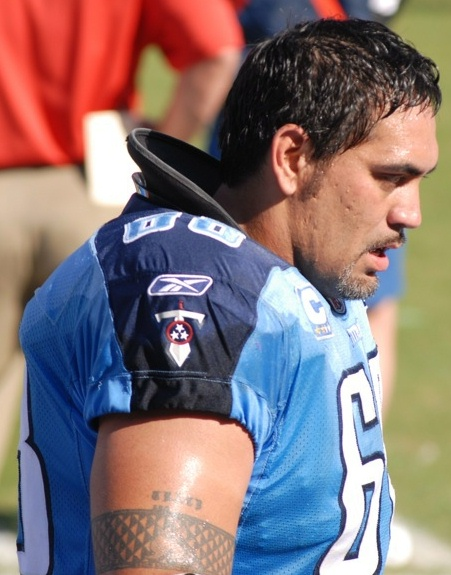
- Mawae with the Tennessee Titans in 2008

No. 52, 68
- Positions: Center, guard

Personal information
- Born: January 23, 1971 (age 55); Savannah, Georgia, U.S.
- Listed height: 6 ft 4 in (1.93 m)
- Listed weight: 289 lb (131 kg)

Career information
- High school: Leesville (Leesville, Louisiana)
- College: LSU (1989–1993)
- NFL draft: 1994: 2nd round, 36th overall pick

Career history

Playing
- Seattle Seahawks (1994–1997); New York Jets (1998–2005); Tennessee Titans (2006–2009)

Coaching
- Chicago Bears (2016) Assistant offensive line coach; Arizona State (2018–2020) Offensive analyst; Indianapolis Colts (2021–2022) Assistant offensive line coach; Indianapolis Colts (2022) Tight ends coach; Lipscomb Academy (2023) Head coach

Awards and highlights
- 3× First-team All-Pro (1999, 2001, 2008); 4× Second-team All-Pro (1998, 2000, 2002, 2004); 8× Pro Bowl (1999–2004, 2008, 2009); NFL 2000s All-Decade Team; PFWA All-Rookie Team (1994); New York Jets Ring of Honor; First-team All-SEC (1991); 2× Second-team All-SEC (1992, 1993)

Career NFL statistics
- Games played: 241
- Games started: 238
- Fumble recoveries: 7
- Stats at Pro Football Reference
- Pro Football Hall of Fame

Kevin James Mawae (/məˈwaɪ/; born January 23, 1971) is an American former professional football player who was a center in the National Football League (NFL) for 16 seasons. Mawae played college football for the LSU Tigers, earning first-team All-SEC honors. He was selected by the Seattle Seahawks in the second round of the 1994 NFL draft. After joining the New York Jets in 1998, he received six consecutive Pro Bowl selections and five-first All-Pro honors during his eight seasons with the team. Mawae spent his final four seasons as a member of the Tennessee Titans, extending his Pro Bowl selections to eight and his first-team All-Pro honors to seven. Near the end of his career, he also served two terms as NFLPA president from 2008 to 2012.

Following his retirement, Mawae pursued a coaching career and was hired by the Colts in 2021 as their assistant offensive line coach. He was inducted to the Pro Football Hall of Fame in 2019.

== Early life ==
A military brat, Mawae grew up wherever his father, Sgt. 1st Class David Mawae, was stationed. Born in Savannah, Georgia, while his father served at Hunter Army Airfield, he spent three years of his childhood (ages 5–7) in Fort Riley, Kansas, and then five years (ages 8–12) in Hanau, (Germany) when his father was stationed at Fliegerhorst Army Airfield. It was in Hanau where Mawae began playing football. His father was then stationed at Fort Polk, near Leesville, Louisiana. Mawae attended Leesville High School, where he was an all-state football selection and earned all-academic honors.

== College career ==
Mawae attended Louisiana State University, where he played for the LSU Tigers football team from 1989 to 1993. He was redshirted in 1989. He started seven games at left tackle and was a freshman All-SEC selection in 1990, and also was the Tigers' long snapper.

After his sophomore season, he was a first-team All-SEC selection, having played three different positions: left tackle (8 games), center (3 games), and left guard (1 game). As a junior, he played left tackle and was chosen second-team All-SEC and was a third-team All-American. For his senior season he moved from left tackle to center for all 11 games. He played in the Blue-Gray Game and Senior Bowl after his senior season. Mawae was inducted into the LSU Athletic Hall of Fame in 2007.

== Professional career ==
Pre-draft measurables
| Height | Weight | Arm length | Hand span | 40-yard dash | 10-yard split | 20-yard split | 20-yard shuttle | Vertical jump | Broad jump | Bench press |
|---|---|---|---|---|---|---|---|---|---|---|
| 6 ft 3 5/8 in (1.92 m) | 285 lb (129 kg) | 31 in (0.79 m) | 10 1/4 in (0.26 m) | 5.35 s | 1.84 s | 3.06 s | 4.57 s | 29.0 in (0.74 m) | 9 ft 0 in (2.74 m) | 22 reps |
All values from NFL Combine

=== Seattle Seahawks ===
Mawae was selected by the Seattle Seahawks in the second round (36th overall) of the 1994 NFL draft. He was Louisiana State's highest selected offensive lineman since Bo Strange in 1961. Mawae saw his first pro action at right guard against the Los Angeles Raiders on September 11, and never left the lineup after taking over early in the game versus the Indianapolis Colts. He finished the season playing in 14 games, starting the final 11 at right guard.

After the season Mawae earned first-team All-Rookie honors from Pro Football Weekly/Pro Football Writers Association, College and Pro Football Newsweekly and Football News.

In 1995, he started all 16 games at right guard, seeing time at center in two games. In his first two seasons he helped pave the way for Seahawks running back Chris Warren to have back-to-back Pro Bowl seasons of over 1,300 yards rushing.

He was moved to the center position at the start of his 1996 season and remained at that spot for the rest of his NFL career.

=== New York Jets ===
In 1998, Mawae was signed by the New York Jets. In his first season in New York, the Jets' offense averaged 357.2 yards per game (second-best in AFC and fourth-best in NFL), while controlling the ball for an average of 32:17 minutes per game (second-best in AFC and third-best in NFL), also helped running back Curtis Martin to rush for franchise-record eight 100-yard rushing games en route to 1,287-yard season. He started all 16 games. In 1999, he was named to his first Pro Bowl on December 22, he did not miss a play for the second straight season and paved the way for Martin's then franchise-record of 1,464 yards rushing, and snapped to three different quarterbacks; Vinny Testaverde, Rick Mirer and Ray Lucas.

During the 2000 NFL season, he was a member of an offensive line that managed to tie the Indianapolis Colts for the fewest sacks allowed during the regular season with 20. Also, he helped the Jets offense average 337.2 yards per game which was the 12th best in the NFL and the passing offense averaged 245.3 yards per game (sixth in NFL). Mawae earned his second consecutive starting spot as an AFC team Pro Bowl center when he was selected to the Pro Bowl on six consecutive occasions (1999–2004). In 2002, he underwent offseason shoulder surgery to repair damage to his left rotator cuff; he missed two preseason games but kept his consecutive games started streak by making 124th consecutive starts. In the season opener against the Buffalo Bills. his unbroken streak of 177 games came to an end in October 2005 with a serious triceps injury to his left arm, and he missed the rest of the season. On March 5, 2006, he was cut by the Jets.

=== Tennessee Titans ===
After being cut by the Jets, Mawae was signed by the Tennessee Titans nine days later on March 14, 2006. In his first season with Tennessee, he helped the offense rank third in the AFC and fifth in the NFL in rushing with 2,214 yards. The Titans set a franchise record by averaging 4.7 yards per carry, and the offensive line, led by Mawae, finished tied for 10th in the league with only 29 sacks allowed, Titans running back Travis Henry finished 2006 with 1,211 rushing yards and rookie quarterback Vince Young was named AP Offensive Rookie of the Year.

In 2007, Mawae was voted team captain and started 14 games, helping LenDale White register his first career 1,000-yard season as he finished with 1,110.

In 2009, Mawae was ranked fifth in a Sports Illustrated poll of "dirty players". The magazine surveyed 296 NFL players to come up with the ranking. Mawae was quoted on the Titans' site as saying he was "proud" of the recognition because he plays the game hard. "I’ve been known to leg whip a time or two. I've paid the price for those, both physically and in the pocket."

On September 10, 2010, Mawae announced that he was retiring from the NFL after 16 years in the league. Mawae would be elected to his 7th and 8th Pro Bowl for the 2008 and 2009 seasons. His last game was the 2009 Pro Bowl in February 2010.

On February 2, 2019, Mawae was announced to be a part of the 2019 Pro Football Hall of Fame class.

== NFL Players Association ==
Mawae joined the NFLPA's executive committee in 2002, where he was elected president in March 2008 and was re-elected in 2010. In September 2010, Mawae announced his retirement from the NFL, however he continued to serve as president until the end of his term in March 2012. Mawae's term coincided with the death of longtime NFLPA executive director Gene Upshaw and the 2011 NFL lockout, which Mawae has stated he believes hastened the end of his playing career.

During the NFL kickoff game broadcast in 2010, players from the New Orleans Saints and Minnesota Vikings "raised an index finger" as they took the field, a gesture Mawae has called "one of the proudest moments I ever had".

It was under his presidency that active players were present for negotiations of the collective bargaining agreement. He has also served as an assistant coach in the annual NFLPA Collegiate Bowl.

== Coaching career ==
In 2016, Mawae joined the Chicago Bears coaching staff as an assistant offensive line coach. He was not retained by the Bears for the 2017 season.

In March 2018 Mawae joined the Arizona State University football staff as a quality control analyst where he was reunited with his former New York Jets head coach, Herm Edwards.

In February 2021, Mawae joined the Indianapolis Colts football staff as an assistant offensive line coach.

On January 23, 2023, Mawae became the head coach of the Lipscomb Academy football team in Nashville, Tennessee, replacing Trent Dilfer. On November 3, 2023, he and Lipscomb Academy "mutually agreed to part ways" after the school received a two-year post-season ban for violating a recruiting rule, two of which took place prior to him becoming the head coach.

== Personal life ==
Mawae is of Hawaiian descent. Mawae is married to Tracy Dale Hicks; he proposed to her in the summer of 1992 at LSU Fan Day in front of 140 teammates, 10 coaches and 3,000 fans over the public address system. The couple has a son, Kirkland (born 1997), and a daughter, Abigail (born 2000). The Mawaes were residing in Franklin, Tennessee, until selling the property in 2012. Kevin and his family have since settled back in their home in Baton Rouge, Louisiana.

Before his NFL career, Mawae lost his brother, John, in a car accident. John, a former nose guard at LSU, left a profound effect on Kevin by establishing a strong faith prior to his death. Mawae's tragic loss inspired him to develop a strong Christian faith.

=== Off the field ===
During the 2008 offseason, Mawae and his family spent two weeks in Africa with Children's Cup International Relief, a missions organization that the Mawae family has helped support financially. They traveled primarily in Swaziland, Mozambique, Zambia and Tanzania. He was Eddie Towne's favorite player in ESPN's hit show TILT. He created the First and Goal Challenge, a unique program to benefit Winthrop-University Hospital's outstanding Child Life Program and Pediatric Services.
