= Eddie Fuller (American football) =

American football player (born 1968)

No. 33, 27
- Position: Running back

Personal information
- Born: June 22, 1968 (age 58); Leesville, Louisiana, U.S.
- Listed height: 5 ft 9 in (1.75 m)
- Listed weight: 201 lb (91 kg)

Career information
- High school: Leesville
- College: LSU
- NFL draft: 1990: 4th round, 100th overall pick

Career history
- Buffalo Bills (1990–1993); Carolina Panthers (1995)*; San Antonio Texans (1995)
- * Offseason or practice squad member only

Career NFL statistics
- Rushing yards: 39
- Rushing average: 6.5
- Receptions: 2
- Receiving yards: 17
- Stats at Pro Football Reference

Eddie Jerome Fuller (born June 22, 1968) is an American former professional football player who was a running back for the Buffalo Bills of the National Football League (NFL). He played college football for the LSU Tigers and was selected by the Bills in the fourth round (100th overall) of the 1990 NFL draft, and played for the team from 1991 until 1993.

Fuller played college football at Louisiana State University. He caught the winning touchdown pass in the famed Earthquake Game. He was born in Leesville, Louisiana and played prep football at Leesville High School.
