= Leesville station =

- Kansas City Southern Depot
- U.S. National Register of Historic Places
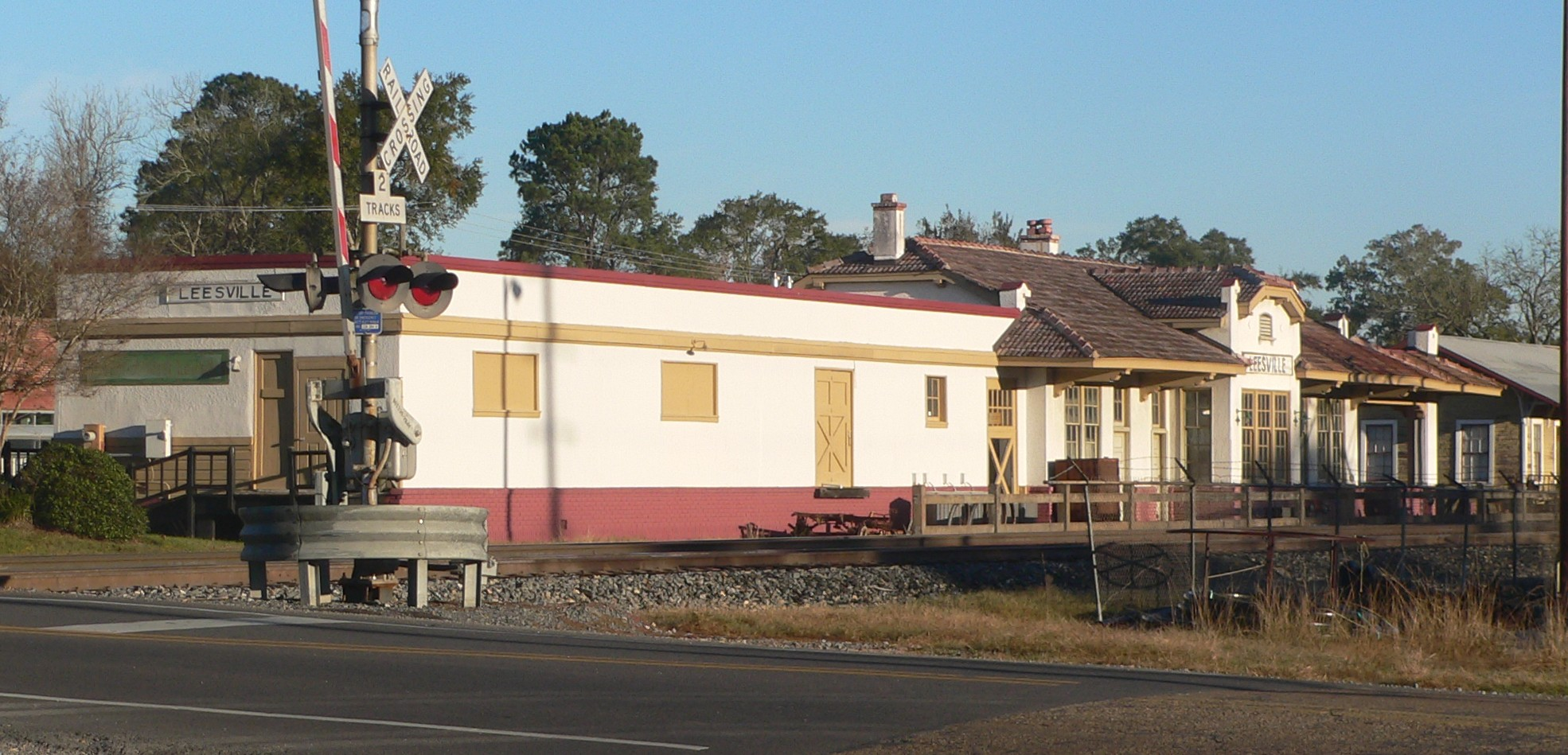

- Location within Louisiana Location within the United States
- Location: Leesville, Louisiana
- Coordinates: 31°08′09″N 93°15′43″W
- Architectural style: Mission Revival
- NRHP reference No.: 84000080
- Added to NRHP: October 25, 1984

The Kansas City Southern Depot, now the Museum of West Louisiana, is a former railway station in Leesville, Louisiana. It was built by the Kansas City Southern Railway in 1916. It served as a combination of passenger station, freight station, and crew change point. The station was a busy shipping point during the Vernon Parish lumber boom in the early part of the 1900s. A local KCS train served the station into the 1960s.

The building was donated to Vernon Parish on May 20, 1982. The station was added to the National Register of Historic Places on October 25, 1984. It was converted into a museum.

Preceding station	Kansas City Southern Railway	Following station
Orangeville toward Kansas City	Main Line	Pickering toward Port Arthur
