= Michael Ford (gridiron football) =

American football player (born 1990)

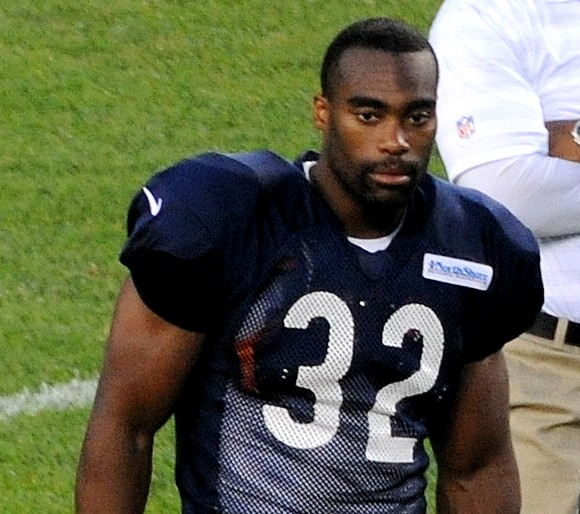
- Ford at Bears training camp in 2014.

No. 32, 27
- Position: Running back

Personal information
- Born: May 27, 1990 (age 36); Leesville, Louisiana, U.S.
- Listed height: 5 ft 10 in (1.78 m)
- Listed weight: 216 lb (98 kg)

Career information
- High school: Leesville
- College: LSU (2009–2012)
- NFL draft: 2013: undrafted

Career history
- Chicago Bears (2013−2014); Hamilton Tiger-Cats (2015); Atlanta Falcons (2015)*; Hamilton Tiger-Cats (2015); Saskatchewan Rough Riders (2016)
- * Offseason or practice squad member only

Career NFL statistics
- Return yards: 37
- Stats at Pro Football Reference

Michael Deshown Ford (born May 27, 1990) is an American former professional football player who was a running back in the National Football League (NFL) and Canadian Football League (CFL). He was signed by the Chicago Bears after going undrafted in the 2013 NFL draft, and played college football for the LSU Tigers. Ford was considered one of the better running back prospects of his class.

== Early life ==
A native of Leesville, Louisiana, Ford was an All-American running back at Leesville High School. Regarded as a four-star recruit by Rivals.com, Ford was listed as the #7 running back prospect in the class of 2009.

== College career ==
In 2012, Ford ranked second in the Southeastern Conference in kickoff returns, averaging 27.5 yards on 20 returns, along with four kickoff returns of 40 yards or more; one of those returns was for 86 yards against Arkansas, which set up a touchdown. Ford concluded his college career with 37 appearances, and 5 games started, scoring 14 touchdowns (13 rushing and 1 receiving).

== Professional career ==
=== 2013 NFL draft ===
Ford put up impressive combine results measuring in at 5-9.5 210 pounds, running an unofficial 4.38 40 yard dash and bench pressing 225 pounds 25 times. He was ranked number one at his prospective position in the broad jump with a distance of 10 feet 10 inches, third in the vertical jump with a height of 39.5 inches, fourth in the 60 yard shuttle with a time of 11.43 seconds, and fifth in the 3-cone drill with a time of 6.87 seconds (Combine results from nfl.com). His bench press is listed as 7th best, however, 3 of the prospects he is ranked behind more than likely will be fullback candidates in the NFL not a true running back.

Pre-draft measurables
| Height | Weight | Arm length | Hand span | 40-yard dash | 10-yard split | 20-yard split | 20-yard shuttle | Three-cone drill | Vertical jump | Broad jump | Bench press |
|---|---|---|---|---|---|---|---|---|---|---|---|
| 5 ft 9 1/2 in (1.77 m) | 210 lb (95 kg) | 30 3/8 in (0.77 m) | 9 in (0.23 m) | 4.40 s | 1.48 s | 2.56 s | 4.25 s | 6.87 s | 39.5 in (1.00 m) | 10 ft 10 in (3.30 m) | 25 reps |
All values from NFL Combine/Pro Day

=== Chicago Bears ===
After going undrafted in the 2013 NFL draft, Ford was signed by the Chicago Bears on April 28. The Bears released Ford on August 23, 2014.

=== Hamilton Tiger-Cats ===
Ford signed with the Hamilton Tiger-Cats on June 10, 2015.

=== Atlanta Falcons ===
On August 7, 2015, Ford was signed by the Atlanta Falcons. On August 30, 2015, he was waived by the Falcons.

=== Second stint with the Tiger-Cats ===
On September 27, 2015, Ford was added to the Tiger-Cats' non-active roster. He was added to the active roster on October 1, 2015.
