= William H. West (Louisiana politician) =

American educator and politician serving from 1978 to 1984

Member of the Louisiana House of Representatives
- In office 1978–1984

Personal details
- Born: February 13, 1928 Hornbeck, U.S.
- Died: August 22, 2016 (aged 88) Prairieville, Louisiana, U.S.
- Party: Democratic

William H. West (February 13, 1928 – August 22, 2016) was an American educator and politician.

West was born in Hornbeck, Vernon Parish, Louisiana and graduated from Leesville High School in Leesville, Louisiana. He received his bachelor's degree in biology from Northwestern State University. West served in the United States Army and was a medic instructor. He was a teacher, coach, and principal with the Vernon Parish school system. West also taught nursing at the Northwestern University, He served in the Louisiana House of Representatives from 1978 to 1984 for two terms and was a Democrat. He died in Praireville, Ascension Parish, Louisiana.
