= Dana Ulery =

American computer scientist (born 1938)

Dana L. Ulery
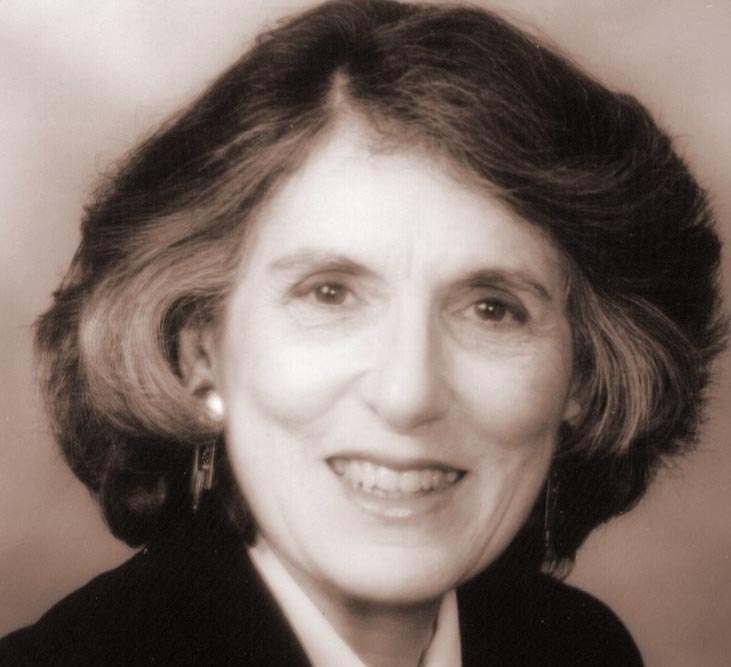
- Born: January 2, 1938 (age 88); East St. Louis, Illinois, USA
- Education: BA, Grinnell College, 1959; MS, University of Delaware, 1972; PhD, University of Delaware, 1975.
- Alma mater: Grinnell College, University of Delaware
- Scientific career
- Fields: Computer science
- Workplaces: United States Army Research Laboratory, Georgia Institute of Technology, University of Delaware, DuPont, Cairo University, American University in Cairo, Jet Propulsion Laboratory
- Thesis: Computer science's reincarnation of finite differences (1976)

Dana Lynn Ulery (born January 2, 1938) is an American computer scientist and engineer known for her contributions to aerospace computing, software engineering, and computational mathematics. She is known as being a pioneer in using computers to solve huge science problems. Dana was the first female engineer hired at NASA's Jet Propulsion Laboratory(JPL), where she worked on mission software supporting early lunar exploration during the Ranger program. Her career later expanded into research and development in government computing systems, numerical algorithms, and information technologies used in engineering and defense applications. Ulery's work includes research on symbolic and numerical algorithms for partial differential equations and software systems for statistical quality control, and she is widely recognized as an early pioneer for women in computer science and engineering.

== Early life and education ==
Dana Lynn Ulery was born on January 2, 1928, in East St. Louis, Illinois, United States. She attended Grinnell College in Iowa, where she earned a Bachelor of Arts degree in 1959 with a double major in English literature and mathematics.

After beginning her professional career, Ulery pursued graduate study in computer science at the University of Delaware. She earned a Master of Science degree in computer science in 1972 and later completed a Doctor of Philosophy(PhD) in computer science in 1975. Her graduate work focused on computational mathematics and numerical techniques used to solve complex and mathematical problems using computers. These areas of research later influenced her work in scientific computing and algorithm development.

== Career ==
Ulery began her career in 1960 as the first woman engineer at the NASA Jet Propulsion Laboratory (Pasadena, CA) while also being the only female engineer hired there for the next seven years, designing and developing algorithms to model NASA’s Deep Space Network capabilities and automating real-time tracking systems for the Ranger and Mariner space missions using a North American Aviation Recomp II, 40-bit word size computer. Over the course of her career, she has held positions as an applied science and technology researcher and manager in industry, academia, and government. In 2007, she retired from her position as Chief Scientist of the Computational and Information Sciences Directorate at the United States Army Research Laboratory (ARL).

In 1976, she accepted visiting faculty appointments at Cairo University in Egypt and the American University in Cairo. On her return to the U.S., she joined the Engineering Services Division of the DuPont Company, where she worked as a computer scientist and technical manager. In the early 1980s, Ulery led initiatives to develop and deploy enterprise application systems to evaluate and control product quality at DuPont sites. For these achievements she was awarded the DuPont Engineering Award for Leadership of Corporate Quality Computer Systems. Ulery also played an active role in establishment of EDI standards, international standards for electronically exchanging technical information used by business and government. She initiated and led multidisciplinary programs at ARL to advance research in multi-source information fusion and situational understanding applied to non-traditional battle environments and homeland defense.

In the 1990s, Ulery served for many years as Pan American Delegate to the United Nations Electronic Data Interchange for Administration, Commerce, and Trade (UN/EDIFACT). She was Chair of the UN/EDIFACT Multimedia Objects Working Group and Chair of the UN/EDIFACT Product Data Working Group, leading early international development of standards for electronic commerce.

== Awards ==
Ulery was among the first group of female managers at the US Army Research Laboratory. In these positions, she was also appointed Chair of the US Army Materiel Command Knowledge Management Council, and in 2002 was awarded the Army Knowledge Award for Best Transformation Initiative. She is listed in American Men and Women of Science, Who’s Who of American Women, Who’s Who in the East, Who’s Who in the World, and Who’s Who in America. She was named a Lifetime Achiever by Marquis Who's Who in 2017.

== Research and Publications ==
In addition to her engineering and government work, Ulery conducted research in computer science and applied mathematics. Her publications address topics including numerical algorithms, symbolic computation, and software systems designed for engineering applications.

Ulery co-authored research on symbolic and numerical algorithms used to solve partial differential equations. This work explored methods that combined symbolic manipulation with numerical computation in order to improve the efficiency of computer-based mathematical modeling. These approaches were designed to assist scientists and engineers working with complex systems that require computational solutions to differential equations.

She also examined computational approaches to finite difference methods, numerical techniques used to approximate solutions to differential equations that arise in scientific and engineering problems. These methods are widely used in simulations and engineering analysis where exact solutions are not available.

Later work by Ulery addressed the design of software systems used in statistical quality control. In a paper presented at the 13th IFAC Workshop on Real Time Programming, she discussed the software requirements necessary for systems that monitor and analyze manufacturing processes in real time. Such systems use statistical methods to detect variations in production processes and ensure product quality.

== Additional Publications ==
- Ulery, Dana L (1972). Lineal a language-oriented system for solving problems in linear algebra (M.S.). University of Delaware. OCLC 3716008.
