= Cathy Osgood =

American NASA female engineer

Catherine T. Osgood
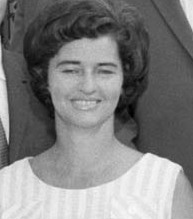
- Education: Florida State University
- Occupation: Aerospace engineer
- Employer: NASA

Catherine T. Osgood was an American aerospace engineer and one of the first few women to work at NASA. She is known for her work on spacecraft rendezvous for the Apollo lunar landing in 1969.

== Early life and education ==
Osgood grew up in rural South Florida. After high school, she worked for a year for a fruit shipper and at a service station to save money for college. She studied at Florida State University in Tallahassee, Florida. In junior year, she switched her major from Chemistry to Mathematics.

== Career ==
Osgood’s first job was at the parapsychology laboratory at Duke University. She worked with Louisa Rhine on extrasensory perception (ESP). While in Florida for a few years, she worked with the VA (Veterans Administration). Her next job was as a math aide at NASA with the Space Task Group. Just before moving to Houston in July 1962, Osgood's job changed to that of aerospace engineer.

Osgood joined the Johnson Space center, NASA, in Houston, and with the help of a live-in nanny and grandparents who were able to help with the care of her three children Osgood determined how to coordinate rendezvous in space.

Some of her initial work involved writing programs to compute tracking information of a space station, and she was the leader of the Maths-Physics Branch of the Mission Planning and Analysis Division at NASA. Her early work involved mechanical calculators and then manually plotting the results, until they later moved to punch cards. Most of her work was for Project Gemini, NASA's second human spaceflight program. During Project Gemini, Osgood worked with engineer Kenneth Young and programmer William Reini on the mission plan for the original Gemini 6 rendezvous with an Agena target vehicle, a planning effort that lasted approximately a year and a half to two years.

Osgood’s contributions to spacecraft rendezvous led to decisions that were going to be made for lunar orbit rendezvous.

Osgood’s contributions to spacecraft rendezvous led to decisions that were going to be made for lunar orbit rendezvous. She was a part of a team that came up with techniques to dock and connect in space which resulted in successful moon landings. In the 1970s, she worked as a rendezvous expert for space shuttles. She was also a part of the team that invented the launch window to be able to figure out what day/time/date the shuttle could lift off.

As she started to travel to Cape Canaveral for the launches, she had to use her husband's credit card to cover her expenses because she was not allowed to have her own credit card. When deadlines for her work came up, her husband took care of the kids and she recalls sleeping in the ladies room.

Osgood retired in 2009 after fifty years of service.
