= Carolyn Huntoon =

American scientist (born 1940)

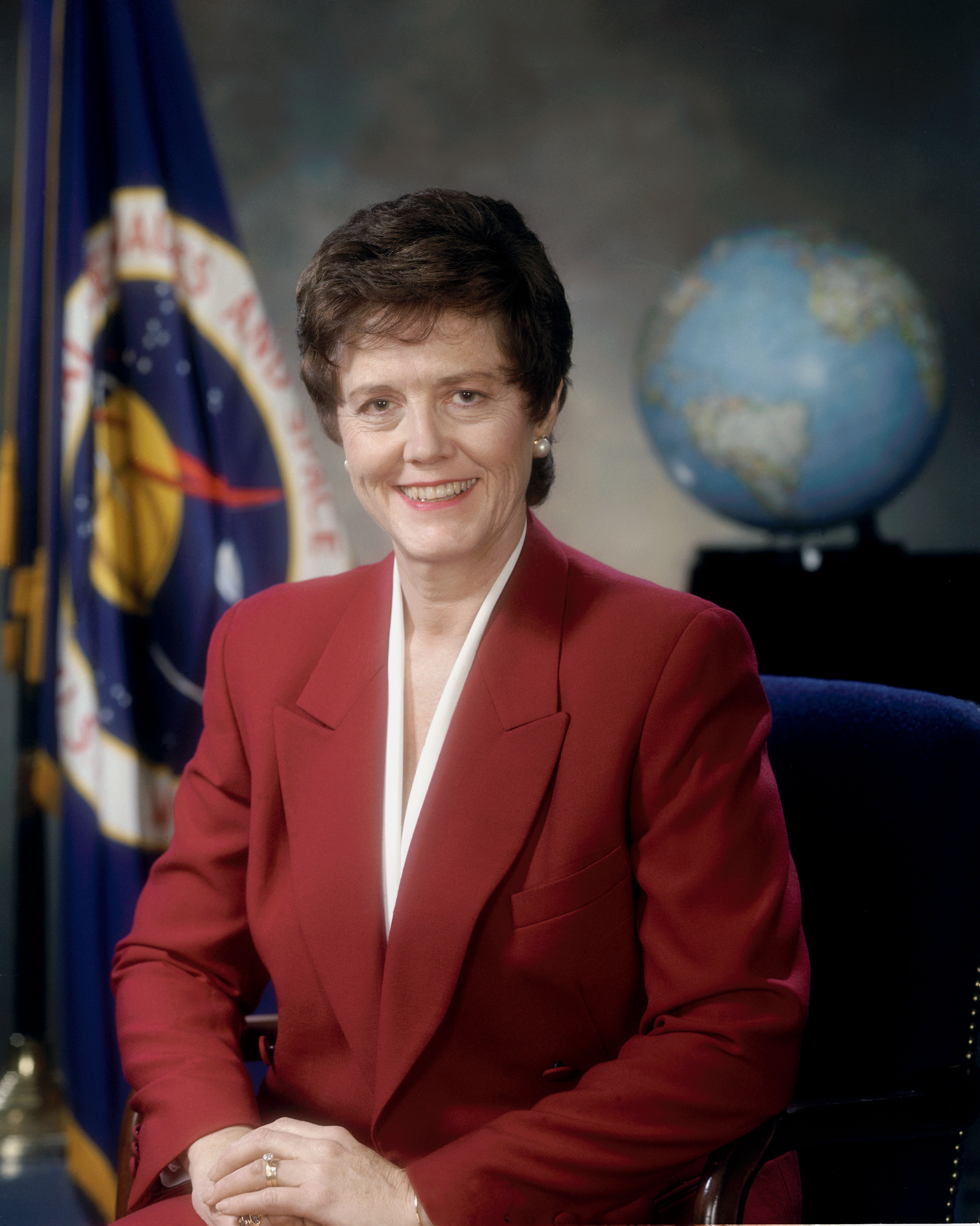
- Huntoon in 1994
- Born: Carolyn Leach; August 25, 1940 (age 86); Leesville, Louisiana, United States
- Education: Northwestern State University (BS 1962); Baylor College of Medicine (MS 1966, PhD 1968)
- Occupation: Scientist
- Organizations: National Aeronautics and Space Administration; United States Department of Energy
- Spouse: Harrison Hibbert Huntoon
- Children: 1
- Relatives: Buddy Leach (brother)
- Awards: NASA Exceptional Scientific Achievement Medal (1974); NASA Exceptional Service Medal (1985); NASA Outstanding Leadership Medal (1989); NASA Distinguished Service Medal (1992)

Carolyn Leach Huntoon (born August 25, 1940) is an American scientist and former government official. She was the director of the Johnson Space Center in Houston, Texas, a position which she held from 1994 to 1996, and was the first woman in the role. She was an assistant secretary at the Department of Energy from 1999 to 2001.

== Biography ==
=== Early life and education ===
Carolyn Leach was born in Leesville, Louisiana, on August 25, 1940. She had four sisters, Frances, Mixon Lee, Gloria Hope and Martha Ann, and an older brother, Anthony Claude (Buddy) Leach Jr., who served a term in the United States House of Representatives representing Louisiana's 4th congressional district from 1979 to 1981. She was educated at Leesville High School, from which she graduated with the class of 1958.

She entered Northwestern State College in Natchitoches, Louisiana, in September of that year. She graduated with a Bachelor of Science (BS) degree in August 1962, and qualified as a medical technologist at Ochsner Foundation Hospital. She attended the University of Texas at Houston for a year in 1963 and 1964, and then Baylor College of Medicine, where she earned her Master of Science (MS) in 1966, and PhD in 1968. As part of her master's thesis, Leach studied aldosterone, a salt-retaining hormone produced by the adrenal gland. This was of particular interest to the National Air and Space Administration (NASA) because astronauts suffered from imbalances of fluids and electrolytes during spaceflight. After she completed her doctorate at Baylor on the control of the stress reaction in animals, she accepted a National Research Council postdoctoral fellowship to study the metabolism of returning space flight crews at NASA's Manned Spacecraft Center in Houston, Texas.

=== NASA career ===
She joined NASA in 1970, and as head of the Endocrine Laboratory, which was then part of the Lunar Receiving Laboratory, performed pre- and post-flight testing of astronauts on the Project Apollo missions. During Project Skylab, some of the experiments she had developed as a postdoctoral researcher were performed on the space station. She married Harrison Hibbert Huntoon; they had a daughter named Sally Ann.

In 1974, Huntoon became head of the Endocrine and Biochemistry Laboratories at the Johnson Space Center, as the Manned Spaceflight Center had been renamed in 1973. She became the chief of the Biomedical Laboratories Branch in 1977. She was a consultant to the US Navy for the Tektite habitat project in 1969 and 1970, the McGovern Allergy Clinic in Houston from 1972 to 1975, the Department of Physiology at Washington State University in Pullman, Washington, from 1974 to 1976, and the American Society of Clinical Pathologists in Chicago from 1974 to 1978. She was also an adjunct professor at the University of Texas Health Science Center at Houston from 1975 to 1987.

Huntoon was appointed to the selection panel for NASA Astronaut Group 8, the first astronaut selection that included women. The selection of six women as astronauts in 1978 doubled the number of women in technical positions at the Johnson Space Center. As the most senior woman already there, Huntoon became a role model and chaperone to the newcomers. She was involved in the center's preparations to cater for women as astronauts and became the point of contact for those with issues with the women astronauts. She went on to serve on subsequent astronaut selection panels until 1994, but expressed regret that fewer women were chosen than she would have liked, the Astronaut Office remaining largely male-dominated into the 21st century.

As Associate Director of the Space and Life Sciences Directorate from 1984 to 1987, Huntoon had to deal with the fallout from the Space Shuttle Challenger disaster. She provided continuity at a turbulent time. She became the Director of the Space and Life Sciences Directorate in 1987. She was now in charge of over 1,200 scientists, engineers and medical doctors, and responsible for the development of flight equipment for habitation in space, including food and medical supplies, and life science studies of the effects of space flight on humans. In 1994, she became the director of the Johnson Space Center. She was the first woman to direct any NASA center. As such, she was in charge of a work force of 15,000 supporting 13 successful Space Shuttle missions, and the development of what became the International Space Station. From 1996 to 1998 she served as the NASA representative in the Office of Science and Technology Policy in Washington, DC.

=== Government career ===
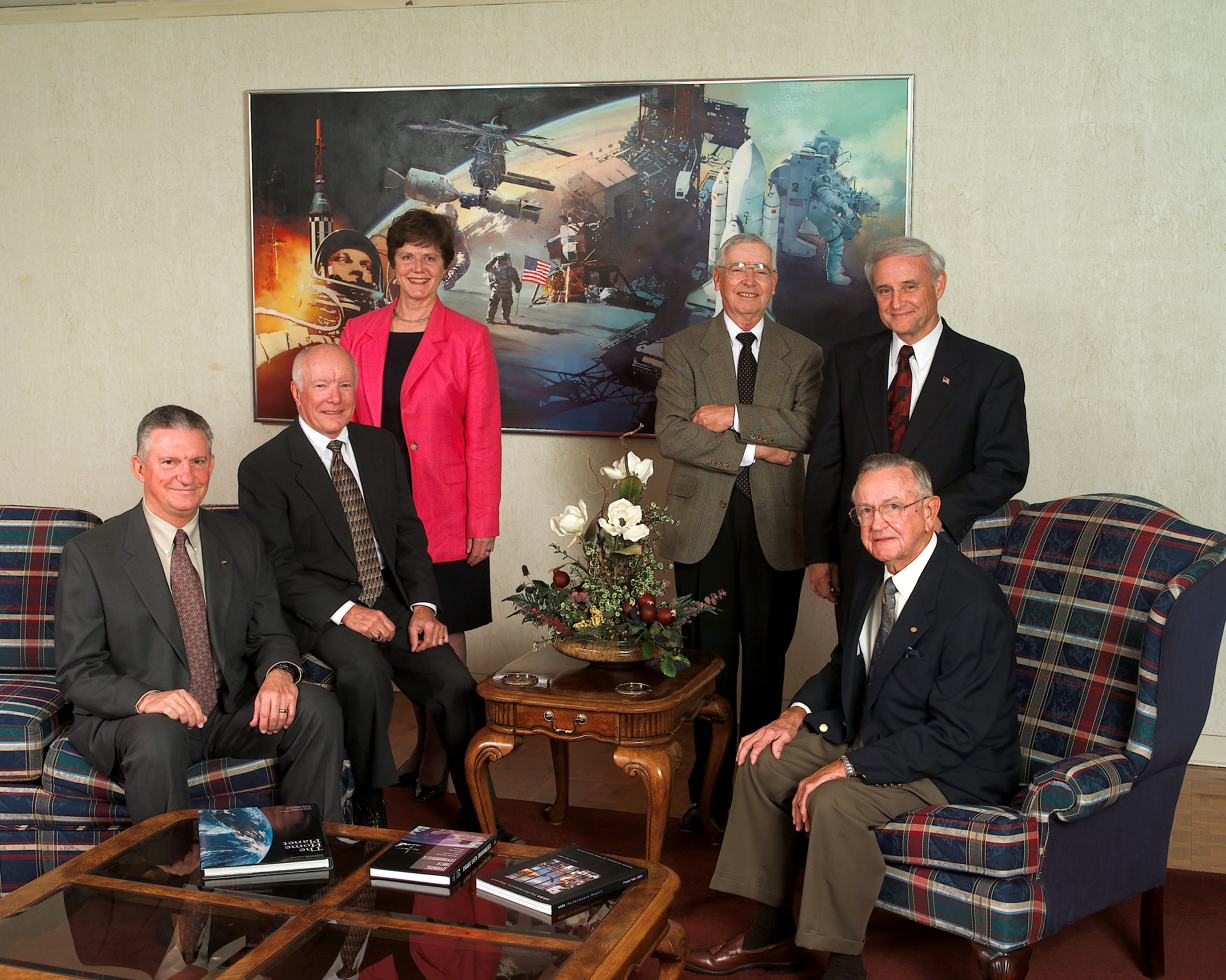
With other directors of the Johnson Space Center in 2002

Huntoon left NASA in 1998 to join George Washington University as an Executive in Residence in its Project Management Program. The following year she was nominated by the President of the United States, Bill Clinton and confirmed by the United States Senate as the fourth Assistant Secretary for the Department of Energy (DOE) Office of Environmental Management. In this role she oversaw the DOE cleanup of the United States nuclear weapons complex at 113 sites in 30 states. She was also responsible for the management of the DOE's field offices at the Idaho National Laboratory, Savannah River, Hanford, Carlsbad, Ohio, (which oversaw the sites at Paducah, Kentucky and Portsmouth, Ohio) and Rocky Flats. After the 2000 United States presidential election President George W. Bush asked her to stay on at the DOE to provide some continuity, which she agreed to do until a suitable replacement was found. She retired in the summer of 2001 and moved to Barrington, Rhode Island. Her husband died in April 2021.

== Awards and honors ==
In 1974, Huntoon was awarded the NASA Exceptional Scientific Achievement Medal, the NASA Exceptional Service Medal in 1985, the NASA Outstanding Leadership Medal in 1989 and the NASA Distinguished Service Medal in 1992, and the Presidential Rank Award of Distinguished Executive in 1994. She was inducted into the Louisiana Political Museum and Hall of Fame in 2003, and in September 2014, Women in Aerospace gave her a lifetime achievement award for "sustained and exemplary leadership at NASA, the Office of Science and Technology Policy and the Department of Energy, her exceptional scientific contributions towards understanding the effects of spaceflight on the human body, and her dedication and mentorship of astronauts and aerospace professionals."
