= Judy Sullivan =

Bio-medical engineer working for NASA on Apollo 11

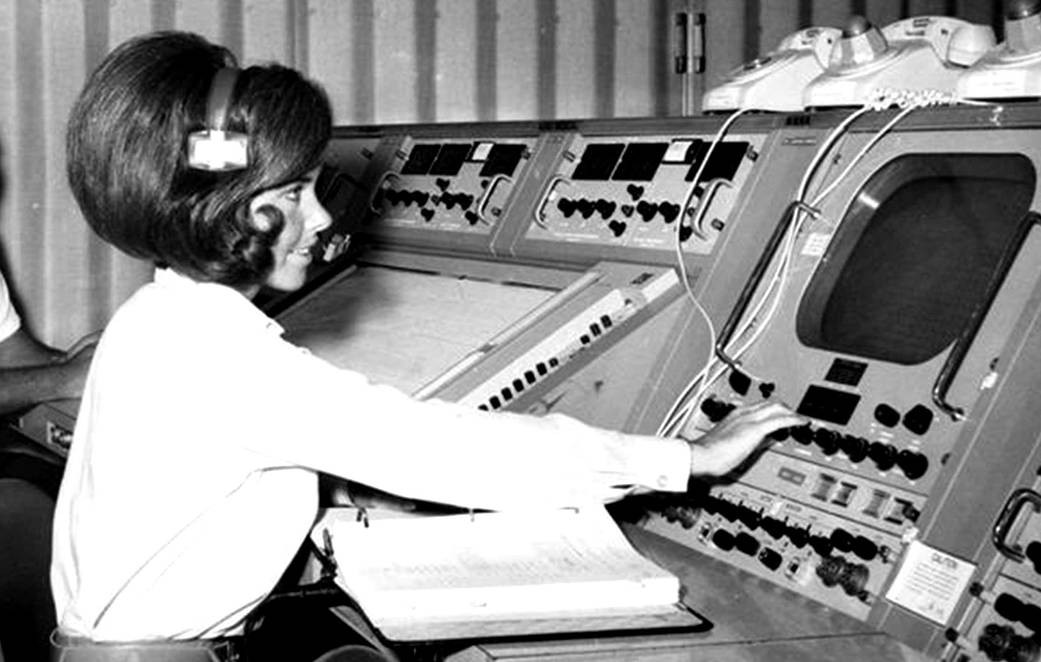
- Sullivan at Kennedy Space Center in 1966
- Born: Judy Shanaberger; December 30, 1942; Uniontown, PA
- Died: September 5, 2024 (aged 81)
- Occupation: Biomedical engineer
- Known for: Work on Apollo 11

Judy Sullivan (December 30, 1942 - September 5, 2024) was an American biomedical engineer who worked for NASA during the Apollo 11, Apollo 10, Apollo 9, Apollo 8, and Gemini 12 missions. She was the lead biomedical engineer for the Apollo 9 and Apollo 11 missions. Sullivan was the only woman in her department, and one of only a relative few women working for NASA in a technical role at that time. She was the first woman engineer hired by NASA for spacecraft testing.

== Early life and education ==
Sullivan (then Shanaberger) attended high school in Alabama, where she graduated as valedictorian. She attended Jacksonville State College in Jacksonville, Alabama, where she majored in biology and minored in chemistry and math and graduated second in her class. She chose to study math and science after hearing a speech by then U.S. president John F. Kennedy encouraging more scholars to study engineering, science, and math. In 2019, she said she would have preferred to attend medical school, but did not have the money to afford it.

== Career ==
=== High school teacher ===
After graduating from college, Sullivan started her career as a high school math and science teacher in Cocoa Beach, Florida. In 1966, she applied for employment at NASA, and was hired as an aerospace technologist and engineer.

=== NASA ===
Sullivan was not recruited by NASA or even applying for a full-time job, but first applied for a summer job with NASA. Sullivan was hired at NASA in 1966 as the first woman engineer in Spacecraft Operations. In the 1960s, 17 percent of the staff at NASA were women, and most of those women were secretaries. She was lead biomedical engineer for the Apollo 11 mission and was the only woman to help Neil Armstrong in the suit lab prior to Apollo 11's launch. Sullivan was in the control room for the 1969 launch, keeping track of the biomedical systems; while she could not see the launch, she said, "My seat rumbled and you knew something powerful was going on".

As a biomedical engineer, Sullivan was responsible for maintaining the medical telemetry devices worn by the astronauts, and monitoring the telemetry from those instruments prior to and during the launch process. Sullivan checked the functioning of the medical telemetry instruments shortly after they were attached to the astronauts during the suit-up process. Later in the flight, responsibility for that telemetry was shifted to the Houston center.

Sullivan was quoted in a news story at the time, saying:

The astronauts wear our sensors which are attached to their bodies during major spacecraft tests and during flight. These sensors monitor their heart beat, take electrocardiograms, and monitor respiration rates and depths.

During spacecraft testing and live launches at KSC, a resident doctor and I, as biomed engineer, sit at the consoles and monitor the biomedical data coming from the spacecraft.

The doctor evaluates the crewman's physical condition, and I, the performance of the biomedical system.

Sullivan noted that hers was the only female voice on the voice channels, so if she made any error, everyone would know who was responsible, while a male voice might not be recognized.

Sullivan did not have an engineering degree, but NASA policy at that time allowed her to be so classified as one based on her academic record in college, where she graduated in the top 20% of her class with a heavy focus on mathematics.

=== Acting ===
Sullivan was respected at NASA for her work with the Apollo 11 spacecraft, but parted ways with NASA following the mission's completion. After NASA, Sullivan's only son moved out and she started to experience empty nest syndrome. Sullivan explored modeling, meeting with the Philadelphia Casting Company, but decided not to pursue it as a career after shooting one commercial. She had a first lead role in a film about a soldier in Vietnam who finds a doctor's diary.

After Apollo 11, Sullivan moved to Ithaca, New York with her husband Marshall Sullivan and taught middle school while her husband attended Cornell University. The couple later moved their family to Pennsylvania, where she worked as a teacher and a food technologist for Kraft. Sullivan was proud of her accomplishments with NASA and continued to encourage young women to go into the fields of science, math, and engineering.

On July 19, 2019, Our Daily Planet declared Sullivan its "Hero of the Week" for her role at NASA and for her encouragement of young women to pursue careers in technology and science.

== Personal life ==
While in training for NASA in St. Louis, Missouri, Sullivan (then Shanaberger) met Marshall Sullivan, and the two began dating. He was later transferred to Florida, and they were married. After the Apollo 11 mission, he pursued an MBA at Cornell University in Ithaca, New York, and she resumed teaching. They later moved to the Lower Macungie Township in the Lehigh Valley region of eastern Pennsylvania, where they raised a family.
