= Leesville, Louisiana =

- City
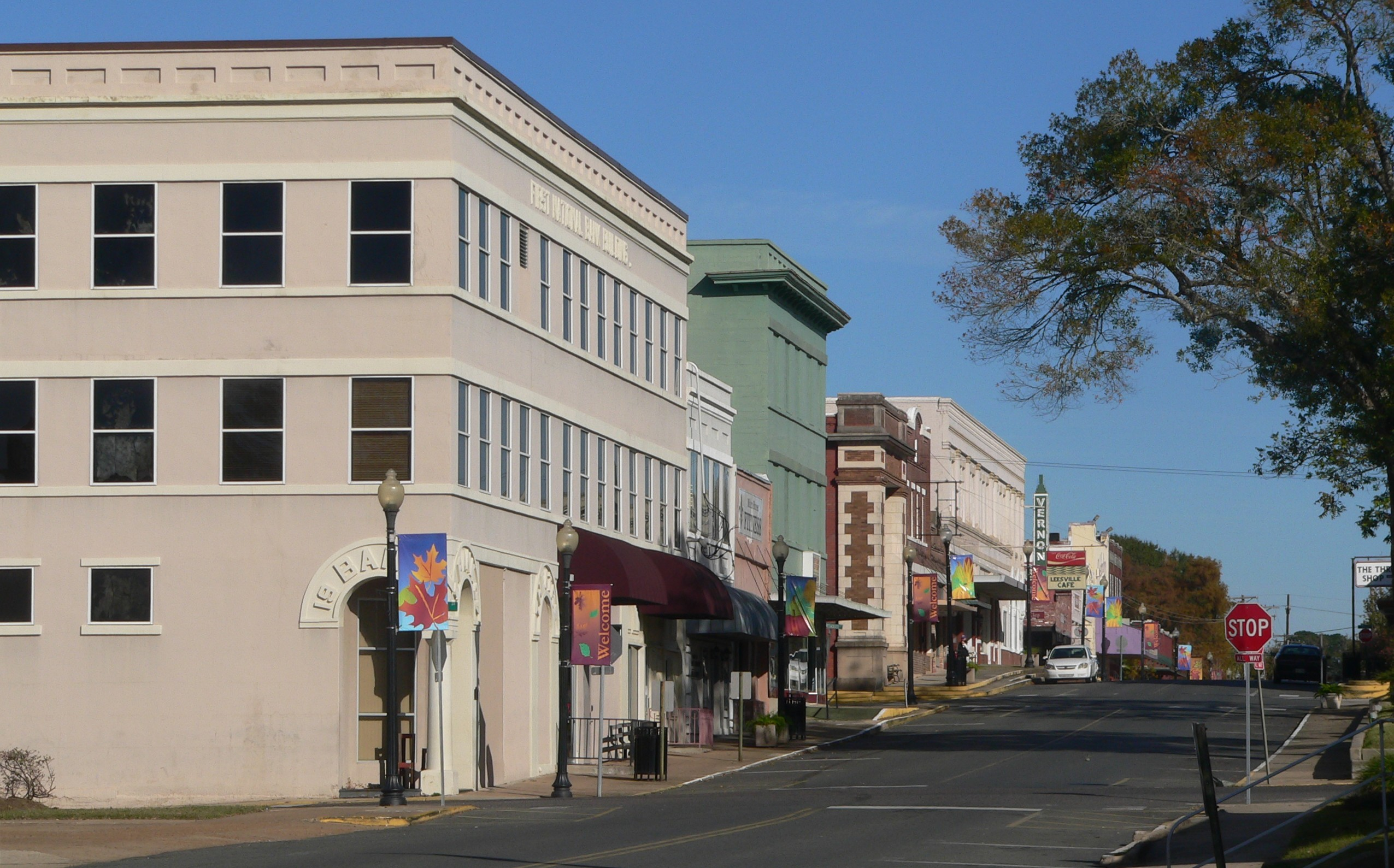
- Downtown Leesville Historic District
- Motto: "Best Hometown in the World"
- Location of Leesville in Vernon Parish, Louisiana.
- Coordinates: 31°06′54″N 93°15′10″W
- Country: United States
- State: Louisiana
- Parish: Vernon

Area
  - Total: 9.03 sq mi (23.38 km^{2})
  - Land: 8.90 sq mi (23.04 km^{2})
  - Water: 0.13 sq mi (0.34 km^{2})
- Elevation: 272 ft (83 m)

Population (2020)
  - Total: 5,649
  - Density: 635.1/sq mi (245.22/km^{2})
- Time zone: UTC-6 (CST)
  - Summer (DST): UTC-5 (CDT)
- ZIP code: 71446, 71459
- Area code: 337
- FIPS code: 22-43010
- GNIS feature ID: 2404908
- Website: City of Leesville, Louisiana

Leesville is a city in and the parish seat of Vernon Parish, Louisiana, United States. The population was 5,649 at the 2020 census. It is part of the Fort Polk South micropolitan area and is additionally served by the Leesville Airport. The city is home to the Fort Polk (known as Fort Johnson from 2023-2025) U.S. Army installation.

== Geography ==
According to the United States Census Bureau, the city has a total area of 5.49 square miles (14.2 km^{2}), of which 5.45 square miles (14.1 km^{2}) is land and 0.04 square miles (0.10 km^{2}) (0.55%) is water.

=== Climate ===
This climatic region is typified by hot, humid summers and mild winters. According to the Köppen Climate Classification system, Leesville has a humid subtropical climate, abbreviated "Cfa" on climate maps. The record high of 110 °F (43 °C) was recorded on August 24 and 25, 2023, and record low of 1 °F (−17 °C) was recorded on January 25, 1948. The average date of first frost is November 10, and the average date of last frost is March 18. This gives it a frost-free season length of 236 days. Leesville averages 39 nights at or below freezing annually.

Climate data for Leesville, Louisiana (1991–2020 normals, extremes 1903–present)
Month	Jan	Feb	Mar	Apr	May	Jun	Jul	Aug	Sep	Oct	Nov	Dec	Year
Record high °F (°C)	84 (29)	88 (31)	92 (33)	93 (34)	99 (37)	104 (40)	108 (42)	110 (43)	109 (43)	98 (37)	90 (32)	88 (31)	110 (43)
Mean maximum °F (°C)	76.2 (24.6)	79.9 (26.6)	85.2 (29.6)	87.5 (30.8)	92.3 (33.5)	96.3 (35.7)	99.1 (37.3)	100.3 (37.9)	97.0 (36.1)	91.1 (32.8)	83.9 (28.8)	78.2 (25.7)	101.4 (38.6)
Mean daily maximum °F (°C)	59.8 (15.4)	64.5 (18.1)	71.6 (22.0)	77.9 (25.5)	84.9 (29.4)	90.5 (32.5)	93.0 (33.9)	93.6 (34.2)	88.5 (31.4)	79.8 (26.6)	69.0 (20.6)	61.4 (16.3)	77.9 (25.5)
Daily mean °F (°C)	48.6 (9.2)	52.8 (11.6)	59.8 (15.4)	65.8 (18.8)	73.5 (23.1)	79.4 (26.3)	81.8 (27.7)	81.7 (27.6)	76.5 (24.7)	66.7 (19.3)	56.9 (13.8)	50.3 (10.2)	66.1 (18.9)
Mean daily minimum °F (°C)	37.4 (3.0)	41.1 (5.1)	47.9 (8.8)	53.7 (12.1)	62.2 (16.8)	68.2 (20.1)	70.6 (21.4)	69.9 (21.1)	64.6 (18.1)	53.7 (12.1)	44.8 (7.1)	39.2 (4.0)	54.4 (12.4)
Mean minimum °F (°C)	20.1 (−6.6)	24.7 (−4.1)	28.0 (−2.2)	34.7 (1.5)	45.7 (7.6)	59.0 (15.0)	64.5 (18.1)	62.5 (16.9)	49.8 (9.9)	35.1 (1.7)	26.8 (−2.9)	22.9 (−5.1)	18.9 (−7.3)
Record low °F (°C)	1 (−17)	5 (−15)	17 (−8)	29 (−2)	34 (1)	48 (9)	53 (12)	51 (11)	35 (2)	24 (−4)	15 (−9)	6 (−14)	1 (−17)
Average precipitation inches (mm)	5.57 (141)	4.60 (117)	5.51 (140)	5.35 (136)	4.76 (121)	4.77 (121)	4.22 (107)	4.22 (107)	4.28 (109)	5.08 (129)	5.32 (135)	5.63 (143)	59.31 (1,506)
Average precipitation days (≥ 0.01 in)	12.6	11.2	10.7	9.0	8.9	11.9	11.6	10.7	8.8	8.5	9.6	11.9	125.4
Source: NOAA

== Demographics ==
Historical population
Census	Pop.	Note	%±
1900	1,148		—
1910	2,043		78.0%
1920	2,518		23.3%
1930	3,291		30.7%
1940	2,829		−14.0%
1950	4,670		65.1%
1960	4,689		0.4%
1970	8,928		90.4%
1980	9,054		1.4%
1990	7,638		−15.6%
2000	6,753		−11.6%
2010	6,612		−2.1%
2020	5,649		−14.6%
2025 (est.)	5,210	▼	−7.8%
U.S. Decennial Census

=== 2020 census ===
Leesville racial composition
Race	Number	Percentage
White (non-Hispanic)	2,632	46.59%
Black or African American (non-Hispanic)	1,894	33.53%
Native American	49	0.87%
Asian	127	2.25%
Pacific Islander	22	0.39%
Other/Mixed	461	8.16%
Hispanic or Latino	464	8.21%

As of the 2020 census, Leesville had a population of 5,649. The median age was 35.0 years. 25.8% of residents were under the age of 18 and 15.0% of residents were 65 years of age or older. For every 100 females there were 93.1 males, and for every 100 females age 18 and over there were 88.1 males age 18 and over.

There were 2,456 households in the city, including 1,266 family households. Of all households, 29.8% had children under the age of 18 living in them. Of all households, 29.5% were married-couple households, 23.2% were households with a male householder and no spouse or partner present, and 39.0% were households with a female householder and no spouse or partner present. About 38.3% of all households were made up of individuals and 15.1% had someone living alone who was 65 years of age or older.

There were 3,102 housing units, of which 20.8% were vacant. The homeowner vacancy rate was 3.9% and the rental vacancy rate was 21.0%.

94.8% of residents lived in urban areas, while 5.2% lived in rural areas.

=== 2000 census ===
As of the census of 2000, there were 6,753 people, 2,841 households, and 1,650 families residing in the city. The population density was 1,238.7 inhabitants per square mile (478.3/km^{2}). There were 3,389 housing units at an average density of 621.7 per square mile (240.0/km^{2}). The racial makeup of the city was 55.49% White, 35.33% African American, 1.47% Native American, 2.09% Asian, 0.56% Pacific Islander, 2.25% from other races, and 2.81% from two or more races. Hispanic or Latino of any race were 4.92% of the population.

There were 2,841 households, out of which 29.0% had children under the age of 18 living with them, 36.2% were married couples living together, 18.3% had a female householder with no husband present, and 41.9% were non-families. Nearly 36.7% of all households were made up of individuals, and 11.4% had someone living alone who was 65 years of age or older. The average household size was 2.29 and the average family size was 3.02.

In the city, the population was spread out, with 26.1% under the age of 18, 11.0% from 18 to 24, 28.6% from 25 to 44, 20.5% from 45 to 64, and 13.9% who were 65 years of age or older. The median age was 34 years. For every 100 females, there were 96.0 males. For every 100 females age 18 and over, there were 91.4 males.

The median income for a household in the city was $23,864, and the median income for a family was $30,435. Males had a median income of $27,267 versus $21,661 for females. The per capita income for the city was $14,360. About 24.5% of families and 28.7% of the population were below the poverty line, including 42.0% of those under age 18 and 15.1% of those age 65 or over.

== Education ==
The Vernon Parish School Board operates public schools:

- Hicks High School K-12
- Pickering Elementary School K-6
- Pickering High School 7-12
- West Leesville Elementary School: 1-4
- East Leesville Elementary School: PK-K
- Vernon Middle School: 5th and 6th grade
- Leesville Jr. High: 7th and 8th grade
- Leesville High School: 9th through 12th grade

The Vernon Parish Public Library operates the Main Library and the Dunbar Branch Library.

== Notable people ==
- Bert A. Adams, state representative from Vernon Parish from 1956 to 1968
- Ward Connerly, political activist, businessman, and former University of California Regent (1993–2005).
- Michael Ford, LSU running back
- Eddie Fuller - NFL player, running back with the Buffalo Bills
- Bo Harris - NFL player, played with the Cincinnati Bengals
- Carolyn Huntoon - NASA scientist, first woman director of the Johnson Space Center
- Buddy Leach - Politician, former member of the United States House of Representatives
- Demond Mallet - Professional basketball player
- Kevin Mawae - NFL All-Pro Center for the Tennessee Titans New York Jets, Pro Football Hall of Fame
- D'Anthony Smith - NFL player, but spent his teen years in Leesville
- John R. Smith, state senator, former state representative, and former president of the Vernon Parish Police Jury

== See also ==
- Kansas City Southern Depot (Leesville, Louisiana) — on the National Register of Historic Places
